= New Jersey Republican Party =

New Jersey affiliate of the Republican Party

- Chairperson: Christine Hanlon
- Senate Leader: Anthony M. Bucco
- Assembly Leader: John DiMaio
- Founded: 1880
- Headquarters: 150 West State Street, Suite 230; Trenton, New Jersey 08608
- Membership (2025): ▲1,652,061
- Ideology: Conservatism
- Colors: Red
- United States Senate: 0 / 2
- United States House of Representatives: 3 / 12
- Seats in the New Jersey Senate: 15 / 40
- Seats in the New Jersey General Assembly: 23 / 80

Election symbol

Website
- www.njgop.org

The New Jersey Republican Party (NJGOP) is the affiliate of the United States Republican Party in New Jersey. It was founded in 1880 and is currently led by Christine Hanlon.

== Current leadership ==
- Christine Hanlon, Chair
- Pavel Sokolov, Vice Chair
- Michelle Jones Purdy, Secretary
- Shaun Van Doren, Treasurer
- Bill Palatucci, National Committeeman
- Janice Fields, National Committeewoman
- Luke Ferrante, Executive Director

== Current elected officials ==
The New Jersey Republican Party holds a minority in both the New Jersey General Assembly and the New Jersey Senate.

=== Members of Congress ===
==== U.S. Senate ====
- None

Both of New Jersey's U.S. Senate seats have held by Democrats since 2013. Clifford P. Case was the last Republican elected to represent New Jersey in the U.S. Senate in 1972. Case served four consecutive terms before losing the Republican primary in 1978 to Jeff Bell, who himself lost the General election to Democratic challenger Bill Bradley. Two Republicans have served interim appointments to the Senate since: Nicholas F. Brady and Jeffrey Chiesa. Neither ran for election to a full term.

==== U.S. House of Representatives ====
Out of the 12 seats New Jersey is apportioned in the U.S. House of Representatives, three are held by Republicans:

District	Member	Photo
2nd	Jeff Van Drew	
4th	Chris Smith	
7th	Thomas Kean Jr.	

=== State officials ===
==== New Jersey Senate (15/40 seats) ====
- Senate Minority Leader: Anthony M. Bucco of Boonton Township
- Carmen Amato of Lacey
- Jon Bramnick of Westfield
- Kristin Corrado of Totowa
- Owen Henry of Old Bridge
- James W. Holzapfel of Toms River
- Declan O'Scanlon of Little Silver
- Joseph Pennacchio of Montville
- Vince Polistina of Egg Harbor
- Holly Schepisi of River Vale
- Robert Singer of Lakewood
- Parker Space of Wantage
- Doug Steinhardt of Lopatcong Township
- Mike Testa of Vineland
- Latham Tiver of Southampton

==== New Jersey Assembly (23/80 seats) ====
- Assembly Minority Leader: John DiMaio of Hackettstown
- Robert Auth of Old Tappan
- John Azzariti of Saddle River
- Al Barlas of Cedar Grove
- Brian Bergen of Denville
- Robert D. Clifton of Matawan
- Christopher DePhillips of Wyckoff
- Aura Dunn of Mendham Township
- Dawn Fantasia of Franklin Borough
- Vicky Flynn of Holmdel
- Don Guardian of Atlantic City
- Mike Inganamort of Chester Township
- Paul Kanitra of Point Pleasant Beach
- Sean T. Kean of Wall
- Antwan McClellan of Ocean City
- Gregory P. McGuckin of Toms River
- Greg Myhre of Stafford Township
- Erik Peterson of Franklin (Hunterdon)
- Brian E. Rumpf of Little Egg Harbor
- Alex Sauickie of Jackson
- Gerard Scharfenberger of Middletown
- Erik Simonsen of Lower Township
- Jay Webber of Morris Plains

== Past elected officials ==
=== Vice President of the United States ===
- Garret Hobart (1897–99)

=== U.S. senators ===
- John C. Ten Eyck (1859–65)
- Richard Stockton Field (1862–63)
- Alexander G. Cattell (1866–71)
- Frederick T. Frelinghuysen (1866–69, 1871-77)
- William Joyce Sewell (1881–87, 1895–1901)
- John Kean (1899–1911)
- John F. Dryden (1902–07)
- Frank O. Briggs (1907–13)
- Joseph S. Frelinghuysen (1917–23)
- David Baird (1918–19)
- Walter Evans Edge (1919–29)
- Hamilton Fish Kean (1929–35)
- David Baird, Jr. (1929–30)
- Dwight Morrow (1930–31)
- William Warren Barbour (1931–37, 1938–43)
- Albert W. Hawkes (1943–49)
- Howard Alexander Smith (1944–59)
- Robert C. Hendrickson (1949–55)
- Clifford P. Case (1955–79)
- Nicholas F. Brady (1982)
- Jeffrey Chiesa (2013)

=== U.S. representatives ===
==== 1856–1874 ====
- Isaiah D. Clawson (1857–59)
- George R. Robbins (1857–59)
- William Pennington (1859–61)
- John T. Nixon (1859–63)
- John L. N. Stratton (1859–63)
- John F. Starr (1863–67)
- William A. Newell (1865–67)
- George A. Halsey (1867–73)
- William Moore (1867–71)
- John Hill (1867–73, 1881–83)
- John W. Hazelton (1871–75)
- Amos Clark, Jr. of Elizabeth (1873–75)
- William W. Phelps (1873–75, 1883–89)
- Isaac W. Scudder (1873–75)
- Marcus Lawrence Ward (1873–75)
- Samuel A. Dobbins (1873–77)

==== 1875–1899 ====
- Clement H. Sinnickson (1875–79)
- Thomas B. Peddie (1877–79)
- John H. Pugh (1877–79)
- John L. Blake (1879–81)
- Lewis A. Brigham (1879–81)
- Charles H. Voorhis (1879–81)
- George M. Robeson (1879–83)
- Phineas Jones (1881–83)
- John H. Brewer (1881–85)
- Benjamin F. Howey (1883–85)
- John Kean of Elizabeth (1883–85, 1887–89)
- George Hires (1885–89)
- Herman Lehlbach (1885–91)
- James Buchanan of Trenton (1885–93)
- Charles D. Beckwith (1889–91)
- Christopher A. Bergen (1889–93)
- Henry C. Loudenslager (1893–1911)
- John J. Gardner (1893–1913)
- Thomas McEwan, Jr. (1895–99)
- Mahlon Pitney (1895–99)
- Charles N. Fowler (1895–1911)
- Richard W. Parker (1895–1911, 1914–19, 1921–23)
- James F. Stewart (1895–1903)
- Benjamin F. Howell (1895–1911)

==== 1900–1924 ====
- William M. Lanning (1903–04)
- William H. Wiley (1903–07, 1909–11)
- Ira W. Wood (1904–13)
- Henry C. Allen (1905–07)
- Marshall Van Winkle (1905–07)
- William J. Browning (1911–20)
- Dow H. Drukker (1914–19)
- John Henry Capstick (1915–18)
- Edward W. Gray (1915–19)
- Elijah C. Hutchinson (1915–23)
- Frederick R. Lehlbach (1915–37)
- Isaac Bacharach (1915–37)
- John R. Ramsey (1917–21)
- William F. Birch (1918–19)
- Amos H. Radcliffe (1919–23)
- Ernest R. Ackerman (1919–31)
- Francis F. Patterson, Jr. (1920–27)
- Theodore F. Appleby (1921–23)
- Archibald E. Olpp (1921–23)
- Herbert W. Taylor (1921–23, 1925–27)
- Randolph Perkins (1921–36)
- George N. Seger (1923–40)

==== 1925–1949 ====
- Stewart H. Appleby of Asbury Park (1925–27)
- Franklin W. Fort of East Orange (1925–31)
- Charles A. Eaton of Plainfield (1925–53)
- Harold G. Hoffman of South Amboy (1927–31)
- Charles A. Wolverton of Camden (1927–59)
- Fred A. Hartley, Jr. of Kearney (1929–49)
- Peter A. Cavicchia of Newark (1931–37)
- Donald H. McLean (1933–45)
- D. Lane Powers of Trenton (1933–45)
- J. Parnell Thomas of Allendale (1937–50)
- Walter S. Jeffries (1939–41)
- Frank C. Osmers, Jr. of Englewood (1939–43, 1951–65)
- Albert L. Vreeland of East Orange (1939–43)
- Robert W. Kean of Livingston (1939–59)
- Gordon Canfield of Paterson (1941–61)
- Frank L. Sundstrom of East Orange (1943–49)
- Harry Lancaster Towe of Tenafly (1943–51)
- James C. Auchincloss of Rumson (1943–65)
- Frank A. Mathews, Jr. (1945–49)
- Clifford P. Case of Rahway (1945–53)
- Thomas M. Hand (1945–56)

==== 1950–1974 ====
- William B. Widnall of Ridgewood (1950–74)
- Peter Frelinghuysen, Jr. of Morristown (1953–75)
- Milton W. Glenn of Margate City (1957–65)
- Florence P. Dwyer of Elizabeth (1957–73)
- George M. Wallhauser of Maplewood (1959–65)
- William T. Cahill of Collingswood (1959–70)
- John E. Hunt of Pitman (1967–75)
- Charles W. Sandman, Jr. of Cape May Court House (1967–75)
- Edwin B. Forsythe of Moorestown (1970–84)
- Joseph J. Maraziti of Boonton (1973–75)
- Matthew J. Rinaldo of Union (1973–83)

==== 1975–present ====
- Millicent H. Fenwick of Bernardsville (1975–83)
- Harold C. Hollenbeck of East Rutherford (1977–83)
- James A. Courter of Hackettstown (1979–91)
- Marge Roukema of Ridgewood (1981–2003)
- Jim Saxton of Mount Holly (1984–2009)
- Dean A. Gallo of Morris Plains (1985–94)
- Richard Zimmer of Flemington (1991–97)
- Bob Franks of Union (1993–2001)
- Rodney Frelinghuysen of Morristown (1995–2019)
- Frank LoBiondo of Ventnor City (1995–2019)
- William J. Martini of Clifton (1995–97)
- Michael J. Pappas of Franklin Township (1997–99)
- Michael A. Ferguson of Warren Township (2001–09)
- Scott Garrett of Sussex (2003–17)
- Leonard Lance of Lebanon (2009–19)
- Jon Runyan of Mount Laurel (2011–15)
- Tom MacArthur of Toms River (2015–19)

=== Governors ===
- William A. Newell (1857–60)
- Charles Smith Olden (1860–63)
- Marcus Lawrence Ward (1866–69)
- John W. Griggs (1896–98)
- Foster McGowan Voorhees (1899–1902)
- Franklin Murphy (1902–05)
- Edward C. Stokes (1905–08)
- John Franklin Fort (1908–11)
- Walter Evans Edge (1917–19, 1944–47)
- Morgan Foster Larson (1929–32)
- Harold G. Hoffman (1935–38)
- Alfred E. Driscoll (1947–54)
- William T. Cahill (1970–74)
- Thomas Kean (1982–90)
- Christine Todd Whitman (1994–2001)
- Donald DiFrancesco (2001–02)
- Chris Christie (2010–18)

== See also ==
- Republican Party (United States)
- New Jersey
- New Jersey Democratic State Committee
