= 1949 New Jersey gubernatorial election =

- November 8, 1949
- Turnout: 76% (▲9%)
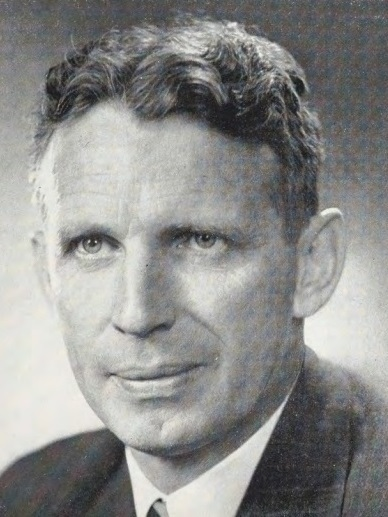

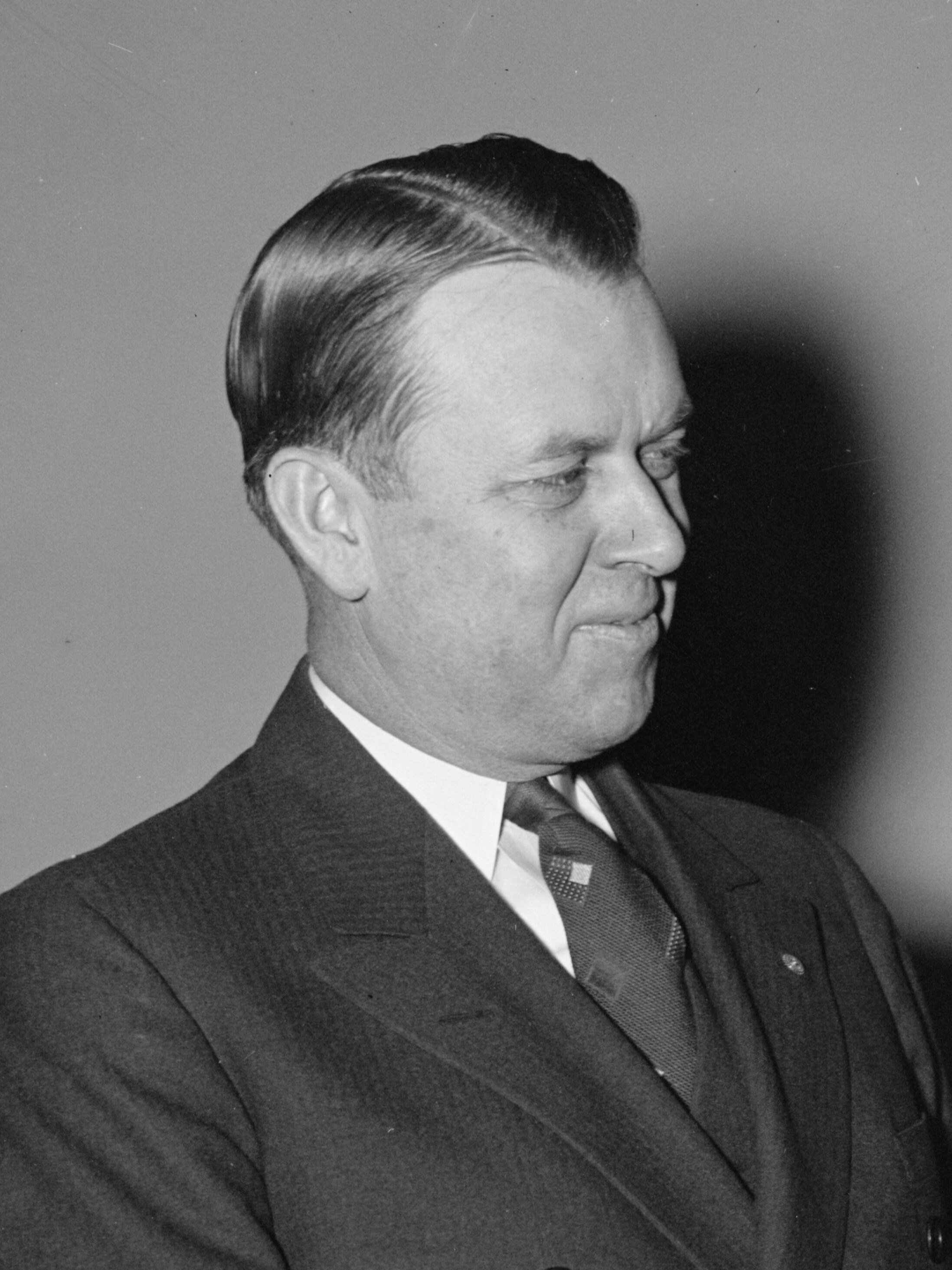
Nominee	Alfred E. Driscoll	Elmer H. Wene
Party	Republican	Democratic
Popular vote	885,882	810,022
Percentage	51.54%	47.13%
- County results Driscoll: 50–60% 60–70% Wene: 50–60% 60–70%
Governor before election
Alfred E. Driscoll
Republican
Elected Governor
Alfred E. Driscoll
Republican

The 1949 New Jersey gubernatorial election was held on November 8, 1949. Primary elections were held on April 19, 1949. Incumbent Republican Alfred E. Driscoll defeated Democratic former U.S. Representative Elmer H. Wene with 51.54% of the vote.

Under the 1947 New Jersey Constitution, Driscoll was the first Governor in state history eligible to succeed himself in a second consecutive term in a popular election. For the first time, the governor was elected to a four-year term, as opposed to three years. This is the most recent time the Republican Party won more than two consecutive gubernatorial elections in New Jersey.

== Background ==
Alfred E. Driscoll was elected Governor of New Jersey in a landslide in 1946 and quickly embarked on a transformative agenda of constitutional reform and political liberalization. His efforts culminated in the 1947 New Jersey constitution, which greatly consolidated state government and increased the power of the office of Governor, and the 1948 Republican Party primaries, in which Driscoll was put forward for the presidential nomination as the favorite son of the New Jersey delegation and successfully maneuvered to have his longtime ally, Robert C. Hendrickson, nominated for United States Senator. Hendrickson supplanted Republican incumbent Albert W. Hawkes, who was viewed as too conservative and unelectable by Driscoll and other party leaders; the move to force out Hawkes and hand-pick a loyal successor alienated some conservative leaders, including Burlington County chair Clifford Ross Powell.

As part of the 1947 constitutional reforms, this was the first popular election in which an incumbent governor was eligible for a second consecutive term.

== Republican primary ==
=== Candidates ===
- Robert L. Adams, Somerset County freeholder
- Alfred E. Driscoll, incumbent Governor of New Jersey

=== Campaign ===
Neither candidate led an aggressive campaign for the nomination. Driscoll reported no expenditures but accepted a few speaking engagements at key county party organization meetings in Monmouth, Essex, Union, and his native Camden County. He campaigned largely on his administration's liberal record and his support for universal health insurance, public housing, and civil rights.

Adams largely failed to raise his profile outside of Somerset and relied primarily on opposition to Driscoll within the party, as well as farmers disaffected by the Governor's suspension of retail milk price controls in January 1942. He accused Governor Driscoll of attempting to "out-deal the New Deal." His campaign spent $1,433 and his personal appearances were confined to rural north-central parts of the state.

=== Results ===
Results by county

Republican primary results
Party	Candidate	Votes	%
Republican	Alfred E. Driscoll (incumbent)	207,144	69.51
Republican	Robert L. Adams	90,885	30.50
Total votes		298,029	100.00

Adams's strength was primarily in rural areas, with an unexpectedly strong showing in Union County.

== Democratic primary ==
=== Candidates ===
- Elmer H. Wene, state senator for Cumberland County, former U.S. representative, and nominee for U.S. Senate in 1944

=== Campaign ===
Wene was recruited to run by Jersey City political boss Frank Hague as early as January 1, 1948, when a spokesman for Hague referred to Wene as the "logical candidate" for governor. Though Hague had retired as mayor in 1947 in favor of his nephew, Frank H. Eggers, he remained in control of the Hudson County and state party machines and remained in office as a member of the Democratic National Committee.

Wene officially filed his petitions one day ahead of the March 10 deadline, appearing personally with his campaign manager, former governor A. Harry Moore. He claimed 60,879 signatures, with about 5,000 coming from Hudson County.

=== Results ===
Democratic Party primary results
Party	Candidate	Votes	%
Democratic	Elmer H. Wene	152,054	100.00
Total votes		152,054	100.00

== General election ==
=== Candidates ===
- John C. Butterworth (Socialist Labor)
- Alfred E. Driscoll, incumbent governor since 1947 (Republican)
- James Imbrie (Progressive)
- Edson R. Leach (Prohibition)
- Elmer H. Wene, state senator for Cumberland County, former U.S. representative, and nominee for U.S. Senate in 1944 (Democratic)

=== Campaign ===
Despite securing the Democratic nomination in the April primary, Wene faced continued opposition from within his party over his refusal to repudiate Hague as party leader. In May, after Hague's nephew lost the Jersey City mayoral election to John V. Kenny, Democratic opposition grew against Wene's candidacy as a symbol of Hague's power, led by Stephen J. Moran, a Newark city commissioner and executive director of the CIO-PAC. Hague initially stepped down as head of the Wene campaign in favor of A. Harry Moore, a close ally, and Wene and Moore did not appoint either Hague or Kenny to an official campaign position, though Moore did praise Hague as "one of the best Democrats in the state." Some Hague critics suggested that the Harry S. Truman administration could offer Wene a federal appointment so compelling as to cause him to give up his campaign for the nomination. Later in the campaign, Hague spoke on behalf of Wene, arguing at a Jersey City rally on October 5 that "every time [the Republicans] bring in Hagueism or cry 'Hague is the issue', we lick them."

In October, Wene supporters were buoyed by an address by U.S. labor secretary Maurice J. Tobin in Newark, in which he told labor leaders, including officials from the American Federation of Labor (AFL) and Congress of Industrial Organizations (CIO), that Wene had "the unreserved backing of the national administration." However, CIO officials emphasized that their "attendance was a tribute to Secretary of Labor Tobin and candidates on the county ticket and is not to be construed as indicating any change in our previously formulated position on the gubernatorial contest."

In an effort to turn the issue of corruption on his opponent, Wene charged Driscoll with "one-man rule [which] means government by fakery, scandal, slander and deceit."

=== Endorsements ===
Elmer H. Wene (D)

Federal executive branch officials

- Maurice J. Tobin, U.S. Secretary of Labor and former governor of Massachusetts

=== Results ===
Ultimately, Wene lost the election, his second close defeat in two statewide campaigns. To prevent Hague from reasserting his dominion over the state and Jersey City, Kenny made a deal to deliver Jersey City to the Republicans, and Driscoll was the first Republican to carry the city since 1920.

1949 New Jersey gubernatorial election
Party	Candidate	Votes	%	±%
Republican	Alfred E. Driscoll (incumbent)	885,882	51.54%	▼5.54
Democratic	Elmer H. Wene	810,022	47.13%	▲5.71
Progressive	James Imbrie	10,840	0.63%	N/A
Socialist Labor	John C. Butterworth	6,515	0.38%	▲0.28
Prohibition	Edson R. Leach	5,529	0.32%	▲0.22
Majority				
Turnout				
Republican hold		Swing		

County	Elmer H. Wene Democratic		Alfred E. Driscoll Republican		James Imbrie Progressive		Edson R. Leach National Prohibition		John C. Butterworth Socialist-Labor		Margin	
County	#	%	#	%	#	%	#	%	#	%	#	%
Atlantic	28,653	50.69%	27,749	49.09%	94	0.17%	26	0.05%	9	0.02%	904	1.60%
Bergen	69,240	36.75%	117,221	62.22%	1407	0.75%	255	0.14%	260	0.14%	-47,981	-25.47%
Burlington	22,467	56.59%	17,139	43.17%	46	0.12%	39	0.10%	10	0.03%	5,328	13.42%
Camden	63,152	59.15%	42,814	40.10%	492	0.46%	187	0.18%	123	0.12%	20,338	19.05%
Cape May	8,809	48.82%	9,221	51.11%	6	0.03%	5	0.03%	1	0.01%	-412	-2.28%
Cumberland	20,236	65.00%	10,797	34.68%	65	0.21%	18	0.06%	14	0.04%	9,439	30.32%
Essex	109,640	39.09%	161,982	57.75%	3476	1.24%	602	0.21%	4,791	1.71%	-52,342	-18.66%
Gloucester	17,508	52.52%	15,745	47.23%	32	0.10%	36	0.11%	13	0.04%	1,763	5.29%
Hudson	137,392	50.30%	133,994	49.06%	1376	0.50%	150	0.05%	237	0.09%	3,398	1.24%
Hunterdon	8,423	53.10%	7,368	46.45%	45	0.28%	13	0.08%	14	0.09%	1,055	6.65%
Mercer	45,543	55.46%	36,084	43.94%	436	0.53%	36	0.04%	24	0.03%	9,459	11.52%
Middlesex	59,909	56.68%	43,054	40.74%	765	0.72%	1823	1.72%	141	0.13%	16,855	15.95%
Monmouth	32,467	43.10%	42,507	56.43%	285	0.38%	47	0.06%	22	0.03%	-10,040	-13.33%
Morris	19,916	35.74%	35,543	63.78%	187	0.34%	53	0.10%	32	0.06%	-15,627	-28.04%
Ocean	8,320	37.27%	13,851	62.04%	132	0.59%	17	0.08%	5	0.02%	-5,531	-24.77%
Passaic	57,680	50.67%	54,858	48.19%	779	0.68%	104	0.09%	408	0.36%	2,822	2.48%
Salem	10,583	59.39%	7,193	40.37%	19	0.11%	19	0.11%	4	0.02%	3,390	19.03%
Somerset	14,888	44.14%	18,699	55.44%	101	0.30%	26	0.08%	12	0.04%	-3,811	-11.30%
Sussex	6,108	47.42%	6,757	52.46%	8	0.06%	1	0.01%	6	0.05%	-649	-5.04%
Union	56,847	42.15%	74,507	55.24%	1070	0.79%	2063	1.53%	381	0.28%	-17,660	-13.09%
Warren	12,241	58.08%	8,799	41.75%	19	0.09%	9	0.04%	8	0.04%	3,442	16.33%
Totals	810,022	47.13%	885,882	51.54%	10,840	0.63%	5,529	0.32%	6,515	0.38%	75,860	4.41%

== Aftermath ==
After the election, Wene launched a campaign against Hague on the Democratic National Committee, claiming support from thirty-two out of forty-two state committee members, representing sixteen counties. The other five counties (Camden, Essex, Mercer, Middlesex and Somerset), led by anti-Hague reformers, denounced his campaign as an effort to retain control of the party through a front.

Wene's defeat ended Frank Hague's efforts at a political comeback. Fearing legal action, Hague spent the remainder of his life living in Manhattan and his mansion on Biscayne Bay, Florida. He died on January 1, 1956, and his body was returned to Jersey City to be laid to rest in a large mausoleum in Holy Name Cemetery.

Wene ran unsuccessfully for U.S. House in 1950, losing narrowly to Republican incumbent T. Millet Hand, and for governor again in 1953, narrowly losing the Democratic nomination to establishment favorite Robert B. Meyner. He died in 1957.
