= New Jersey's 2nd congressional district =

U.S. House district for New Jersey

- Interactive map of district boundaries since January 3, 2023
- Representative: Jeff Van Drew; R–Dennis
- Distribution: 80.55% urban; 19.45% rural
- Population (2025): 797,472
- Median household income: $91,481
- Ethnicity: 63.6% White; 17.4% Hispanic; 11.1% Black; 3.7% Asian; 3.5% Two or more races; 0.6% other
- Cook PVI: R+5

New Jersey's 2nd congressional district is a congressional district located in southern New Jersey, encompassing Gloucester, Salem, Cumberland, Cape May, Atlantic, and Ocean County. The district, which is New Jersey's largest geographically, is a historically competitive one that has shifted towards Republicans since the mid-1990s.

The district's current representative is Republican Jeff Van Drew, who was first elected as a Democrat in 2018. Following his electoral defeat in 2026, Democrat Zack Mullock will succeed him on January 20, 2027.

== Demographics ==
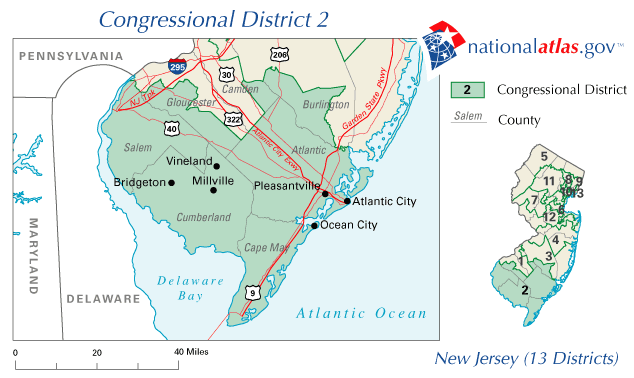
The district from 2003 to 2013

According to the APM Research Lab's Voter Profile Tools (featuring the U.S. Census Bureau's 2019 American Community Survey), the district contained about 528,000 potential voters (citizens, age 18+). Of these, 72% are White, 13% Black, and 11% Latino. Immigrants make up 7% of the district's potential voters. Median income among households (with one or more potential voter) in the district is about $68,127, while 9% of households live below the poverty line. As for the educational attainment of potential voters in the district, 10% of those 25 and older have not earned a high school degree, while 27% hold a bachelor's or higher degree.

== Counties and municipalities in the district ==
For the 118th and successive Congresses (based on redistricting following the 2020 census), the district contains all or portions of six counties and 93 municipalities.

Atlantic County (23):

all 23 municipalities

Cape May County (16):

all 16 municipalities

Cumberland County (14):

all 14 municipalities

Gloucester County (11):

Clayton, East Greenwich Township (part; also 1st; includes part of Mickleton), Elk Township, Franklin Township, Greenwich Township, Harrison Township, Logan Township, Newfield, South Harrison Township, Swedesboro, Woolwich Township

Ocean County (14):

Barnegat Township, Barnegat Light, Beach Haven, Berkeley Township (part; also 4th), Eagleswood Township, Harvey Cedars, Lacey Township (part; also 4th), Little Egg Harbor Township, Long Beach Township, Ocean Township, Ship Bottom, Stafford Township, Surf City, Tuckerton

Salem County (15):

all 15 municipalities

== Recent election results from statewide races ==
| Year | Office | Results |
|---|---|---|
| 2008 | President | Obama 52% - 46% |
| 2012 | President | Obama 53% - 47% |
| 2016 | President | Trump 52% - 45% |
| 2017 | Governor | Murphy 49% - 48% |
| 2018 | Senate | Hugin 55% - 42% |
| 2020 | President | Trump 52% - 47% |
| 2020 | Senate | Mehta 51% - 47% |
| 2021 | Governor | Ciattarelli 60% - 39% |
| 2024 | President | Trump 56% - 43% |
| 2024 | Senate | Bashaw 54% - 44% |
| 2025 | Governor | Ciattarelli 53% - 46% |

== List of members representing the district ==
District organized in 1799.

=== 1799–1801: one seat ===
| Member (District home) | Party | Years | Cong ress | Electoral history | Counties in the District |
|---|---|---|---|---|---|
| Aaron Kitchell (Hanover) | Democratic-Republican | March 4, 1799 – March 3, 1801 | 6th | Elected in 1798. Retired. | Morris and Sussex |

District organized to the at-large district in 1801

=== 1813–1815: two seats ===
For the 13th Congress, elected in 1813, two seats were apportioned, elected at-large on a general ticket.

| Years | Cong ress | Seat A | | | Seat B | | | Counties in the District |
| Years | Cong ress | Member (District home) | Party | Electoral history | Member (District home) | Party | Electoral history | Counties in the District |
| March 4, 1813 – March 3, 1815 | 13th | James Schureman (New Brunswick) | Federalist | Elected in 1813. Retired. | Richard Stockton (Princeton) | Federalist | Elected in 1813. Retired. | Hunterdon, Middlesex, Monmouth, and Somerset Counties |

The district was merged into the at-large district in 1815.

=== 1843–present: one seat ===
| Member (District home) | Party | Years | Cong ress | Electoral history | Counties/Towns in the District |
|---|---|---|---|---|---|
District re-established March 4, 1843
| George Sykes (Mount Holly) | Democratic | March 4, 1843 – March 3, 1845 | 28th | Elected in 1842. Retired. | 1843–1845: Burlington, Mercer, and Monmouth |
| Samuel G. Wright (Imlaystown) | Whig | March 4, 1845 – July 30, 1845 | 29th | Elected in 1844. Died. | 1845–1847: Burlington and Monmouth |
| Vacant | | July 30, 1845 – November 4, 1845 | 29th | | 1845–1847: Burlington and Monmouth |
| George Sykes (Mount Holly) | Democratic | November 4, 1845 – March 3, 1847 | 29th | Elected to finish Wright's term. Retired. | 1845–1847: Burlington and Monmouth |
| William A. Newell (Allentown) | Whig | March 4, 1847 – March 3, 1851 | 30th 31st | Elected in 1846. Re-elected in 1848. Retired. | 1847–1851: Burlington, Mercer, and Monmouth |
| Charles Skelton (Trenton) | Democratic | March 4, 1851 – March 3, 1855 | 32nd 33rd | Elected in 1850. Re-elected in 1852. Retired. | 1851–1873: Burlington, Mercer, Monmouth, and Ocean |
| George R. Robbins (Hamilton Square) | Opposition | March 4, 1855 – March 3, 1857 | 34th 35th | Elected in 1854. Re-elected in 1856. Retired. | 1851–1873: Burlington, Mercer, Monmouth, and Ocean |
| George R. Robbins (Hamilton Square) | Republican | March 4, 1857 – March 3, 1859 | 34th 35th | Elected in 1854. Re-elected in 1856. Retired. | 1851–1873: Burlington, Mercer, Monmouth, and Ocean |
| John L. N. Stratton (Mount Holly) | Republican | March 4, 1859 – March 3, 1863 | 36th 37th | Elected in 1858. Re-elected in 1860. Retired. | 1851–1873: Burlington, Mercer, Monmouth, and Ocean |
| George Middleton (Allentown) | Democratic | March 4, 1863 – March 3, 1865 | 38th | Elected in 1862. Lost re-election. | 1851–1873: Burlington, Mercer, Monmouth, and Ocean |
| William A. Newell (Allentown) | Republican | March 4, 1865 – March 3, 1867 | 39th | Elected in 1864. Lost re-election. | 1851–1873: Burlington, Mercer, Monmouth, and Ocean |
| Charles Haight (Freehold) | Democratic | March 4, 1867 – March 3, 1871 | 40th 41st | Elected in 1866. Re-elected in 1868. Retired. | 1851–1873: Burlington, Mercer, Monmouth, and Ocean |
| Samuel C. Forker (Bordentown) | Democratic | March 4, 1871 – March 3, 1873 | 42nd | Elected in 1870. Lost re-election. | 1851–1873: Burlington, Mercer, Monmouth, and Ocean |
| Samuel A. Dobbins (Mount Holly) | Republican | March 4, 1873 – March 3, 1877 | 43rd 44th | Elected in 1872. Re-elected in 1874. Retired. | 1873–1903: Atlantic, Burlington, Mercer, and Ocean |
| John H. Pugh (Burlington) | Republican | March 4, 1877 – March 3, 1879 | 45th | Elected in 1876. Lost re-election. | 1873–1903: Atlantic, Burlington, Mercer, and Ocean |
| Hezekiah B. Smith (Smithville) | Democratic | March 4, 1879 – March 3, 1881 | 46th | Elected in 1878. Lost re-election. | 1873–1903: Atlantic, Burlington, Mercer, and Ocean |
| J. Hart Brewer (Trenton) | Republican | March 4, 1881 – March 3, 1885 | 47th 48th | Elected in 1880. Re-elected in 1882. Retired. | 1873–1903: Atlantic, Burlington, Mercer, and Ocean |
| James Buchanan (Trenton) | Republican | March 4, 1885 – March 3, 1893 | 49th 50th 51st 52nd | Elected in 1884. Re-elected in 1886. Re-elected in 1888. Re-elected in 1890. Retired. | 1873–1903: Atlantic, Burlington, Mercer, and Ocean |
| John J. Gardner (Atlantic City) | Republican | March 4, 1893 – March 3, 1913 | 53rd 54th 55th 56th 57th 58th 59th 60th 61st 62nd | Elected in 1892. Re-elected in 1894. Re-elected in 1896. Re-elected in 1898. Re-elected in 1900. Re-elected in 1902. Re-elected in 1904. Re-elected in 1906. Re-elected in 1908. Re-elected in 1910. Lost re-election. | 1873–1903: Atlantic, Burlington, Mercer, and Ocean |
| John J. Gardner (Atlantic City) | Republican | March 4, 1893 – March 3, 1913 | 53rd 54th 55th 56th 57th 58th 59th 60th 61st 62nd | Elected in 1892. Re-elected in 1894. Re-elected in 1896. Re-elected in 1898. Re-elected in 1900. Re-elected in 1902. Re-elected in 1904. Re-elected in 1906. Re-elected in 1908. Re-elected in 1910. Lost re-election. | 1903–1933: Atlantic, Burlington, Cape May, and Cumberland |
| J. Thompson Baker (Wildwood) | Democratic | March 4, 1913 – March 3, 1915 | 63rd | Elected in 1912. Lost re-election. | 1903–1933: Atlantic, Burlington, Cape May, and Cumberland |
| Isaac Bacharach (Atlantic City) | Republican | March 4, 1915 – January 3, 1937 | 64th 65th 66th 67th 68th 69th 70th 71st 72nd 73rd 74th | Elected in 1914. Re-elected in 1916. Re-elected in 1918. Re-elected in 1920. Re-elected in 1922. Re-elected in 1924. Re-elected in 1926. Re-elected in 1928. Re-elected in 1930. Re-elected in 1932. Re-elected in 1934. Lost re-election. | 1903–1933: Atlantic, Burlington, Cape May, and Cumberland |
| Isaac Bacharach (Atlantic City) | Republican | March 4, 1915 – January 3, 1937 | 64th 65th 66th 67th 68th 69th 70th 71st 72nd 73rd 74th | Elected in 1914. Re-elected in 1916. Re-elected in 1918. Re-elected in 1920. Re-elected in 1922. Re-elected in 1924. Re-elected in 1926. Re-elected in 1928. Re-elected in 1930. Re-elected in 1932. Re-elected in 1934. Lost re-election. | 1933–1967: Atlantic, Cape May, and Cumberland |
| Elmer H. Wene (Vineland) | Democratic | January 3, 1937 – January 3, 1939 | 75th | Elected in 1936. Lost re-election. | 1933–1967: Atlantic, Cape May, and Cumberland |
| Walter S. Jeffries (Atlantic City) | Republican | January 3, 1939 – January 3, 1941 | 76th | Elected in 1938. Lost re-election. | 1933–1967: Atlantic, Cape May, and Cumberland |
| Elmer H. Wene (Vineland) | Democratic | January 3, 1941 – January 3, 1945 | 77th 78th | Elected in 1940. Re-elected in 1942. Retired to run for U.S. senator. | 1933–1967: Atlantic, Cape May, and Cumberland |
| T. Millet Hand (Cape May) | Republican | January 3, 1945 – December 26, 1956 | 79th 80th 81st 82nd 83rd 84th | Elected in 1944. Re-elected in 1946. Re-elected in 1948. Re-elected in 1950. Re-elected in 1952. Re-elected in 1954. Re-elected in 1956. Died. | 1933–1967: Atlantic, Cape May, and Cumberland |
| Vacant | | December 26, 1956 – November 5, 1957 | 84th 85th | | 1933–1967: Atlantic, Cape May, and Cumberland |
| Milton W. Glenn (Margate City) | Republican | November 5, 1957 – January 3, 1965 | 85th 86th 87th 88th | Elected to finish Hand's term. Re-elected in 1958. Re-elected in 1960. Re-elected in 1962. Lost re-election. | 1933–1967: Atlantic, Cape May, and Cumberland |
| Thomas C. McGrath Jr. (Margate City) | Democratic | January 3, 1965 – January 3, 1967 | 89th | Elected in 1964. Lost re-election. | 1933–1967: Atlantic, Cape May, and Cumberland |
| Charles W. Sandman Jr. (Cape May) | Republican | January 3, 1967 – January 3, 1975 | 90th 91st 92nd 93rd | Elected in 1966. Re-elected in 1968. Re-elected in 1970. Re-elected in 1972. Lost re-election. | 1967–1969: Atlantic, Cape May, Cumberland, and Salem |
| Charles W. Sandman Jr. (Cape May) | Republican | January 3, 1967 – January 3, 1975 | 90th 91st 92nd 93rd | Elected in 1966. Re-elected in 1968. Re-elected in 1970. Re-elected in 1972. Lost re-election. | 1969–1973: [data missing] |
| Charles W. Sandman Jr. (Cape May) | Republican | January 3, 1967 – January 3, 1975 | 90th 91st 92nd 93rd | Elected in 1966. Re-elected in 1968. Re-elected in 1970. Re-elected in 1972. Lost re-election. | 1971–1983: Atlantic, Cape May, Cumberland, Salem, and parts of Burlington and Ocean |
| William J. Hughes (Ocean City) | Democratic | January 3, 1975 – January 3, 1995 | 94th 95th 96th 97th 98th 99th 100th 101st 102nd 103rd | Elected in 1974. Re-elected in 1976. Re-elected in 1978. Re-elected in 1980. Re-elected in 1982. Re-elected in 1984. Re-elected in 1986. Re-elected in 1988. Re-elected in 1990. Re-elected in 1992. Retired. | 1971–1983: Atlantic, Cape May, Cumberland, Salem, and parts of Burlington and Ocean |
| William J. Hughes (Ocean City) | Democratic | January 3, 1975 – January 3, 1995 | 94th 95th 96th 97th 98th 99th 100th 101st 102nd 103rd | Elected in 1974. Re-elected in 1976. Re-elected in 1978. Re-elected in 1980. Re-elected in 1982. Re-elected in 1984. Re-elected in 1986. Re-elected in 1988. Re-elected in 1990. Re-elected in 1992. Retired. | 1983–1985: Atlantic, Cape May, Cumberland, Salem, and parts of Burlington and Ocean |
| William J. Hughes (Ocean City) | Democratic | January 3, 1975 – January 3, 1995 | 94th 95th 96th 97th 98th 99th 100th 101st 102nd 103rd | Elected in 1974. Re-elected in 1976. Re-elected in 1978. Re-elected in 1980. Re-elected in 1982. Re-elected in 1984. Re-elected in 1986. Re-elected in 1988. Re-elected in 1990. Re-elected in 1992. Retired. | 1985–1993: Atlantic, Cape May, Cumberland, Salem, and parts of Gloucester |
| William J. Hughes (Ocean City) | Democratic | January 3, 1975 – January 3, 1995 | 94th 95th 96th 97th 98th 99th 100th 101st 102nd 103rd | Elected in 1974. Re-elected in 1976. Re-elected in 1978. Re-elected in 1980. Re-elected in 1982. Re-elected in 1984. Re-elected in 1986. Re-elected in 1988. Re-elected in 1990. Re-elected in 1992. Retired. | 1993–2003: Atlantic, Cape May, Cumberland, Salem, and parts of Burlington and Gloucester |
| Frank LoBiondo (Ventnor) | Republican | January 3, 1995 – January 3, 2019 | 104th 105th 106th 107th 108th 109th 110th 111th 112th 113th 114th 115th | Elected in 1994. Re-elected in 1996. Re-elected in 1998. Re-elected in 2000. Re-elected in 2002. Re-elected in 2004. Re-elected in 2006. Re-elected in 2008. Re-elected in 2010. Re-elected in 2012. Re-elected in 2014. Re-elected in 2016. Retired. | 1993–2003: Atlantic, Cape May, Cumberland, Salem, and parts of Burlington and Gloucester |
| Frank LoBiondo (Ventnor) | Republican | January 3, 1995 – January 3, 2019 | 104th 105th 106th 107th 108th 109th 110th 111th 112th 113th 114th 115th | Elected in 1994. Re-elected in 1996. Re-elected in 1998. Re-elected in 2000. Re-elected in 2002. Re-elected in 2004. Re-elected in 2006. Re-elected in 2008. Re-elected in 2010. Re-elected in 2012. Re-elected in 2014. Re-elected in 2016. Retired. | 2003–2013: Atlantic, Cape May, Cumberland, Salem, and parts of Burlington, Camden, and Gloucester |
| Frank LoBiondo (Ventnor) | Republican | January 3, 1995 – January 3, 2019 | 104th 105th 106th 107th 108th 109th 110th 111th 112th 113th 114th 115th | Elected in 1994. Re-elected in 1996. Re-elected in 1998. Re-elected in 2000. Re-elected in 2002. Re-elected in 2004. Re-elected in 2006. Re-elected in 2008. Re-elected in 2010. Re-elected in 2012. Re-elected in 2014. Re-elected in 2016. Retired. | 2013–2023: Atlantic, Cape May, Cumberland, Salem, and parts of Burlington, Camden, Gloucester, and Ocean |
| Jeff Van Drew (Dennis Township) | Democratic | January 3, 2019 – January 7, 2020 | 116th 117th 118th 119th | Elected in 2018. Re-elected in 2020. Re-elected in 2022. Re-elected in 2024. Lost re-election. | 2013–2023: Atlantic, Cape May, Cumberland, Salem, and parts of Burlington, Camden, Gloucester, and Ocean |
| Jeff Van Drew (Dennis Township) | Republican | January 7, 2020 – present | 116th 117th 118th 119th | Elected in 2018. Re-elected in 2020. Re-elected in 2022. Re-elected in 2024. Lost re-election. | 2013–2023: Atlantic, Cape May, Cumberland, Salem, and parts of Burlington, Camden, Gloucester, and Ocean |
| Jeff Van Drew (Dennis Township) | Republican | January 7, 2020 – present | 116th 117th 118th 119th | Elected in 2018. Re-elected in 2020. Re-elected in 2022. Re-elected in 2024. Lost re-election. | 2023–present: Atlantic, Cape May, Cumberland, Salem, and parts of Gloucester and Ocean |
| Zack Mullock (Cape May) | Democratic | Assuming office on January 3, 2027 | | Elected in 2026. | 2023–present: Atlantic, Cape May, Cumberland, Salem, and parts of Gloucester and Ocean |

== Recent electoral history ==
Results 1844–2024

| | Democratic | Votes | Pct | Republican | Votes | Pct | Other candidate | Votes | Pct | Other candidate | Votes | Pct | Other candidate | Votes | Pct | Other candidate | Votes | Pct | Other candidate | Votes | Pct |
| 1844 | ✓ George Sykes | 7,573 | 51.9% | William Irick | 6,995 | 48.0% | | | | | | | | | | | | | | | |
| 1844 | George Sykes | 6,503 | 48.5% | ✓ Samuel G. Wright | 6,919 | 51.5% | | | | | | | | | | | | | | | |
| 1846 | Thomas E. Combes | 5,959 | 43.3% | ✓ William A. Newell | 7,531 | 54.7% | (FNU) Ridson (Know Nothing) | 280 | 2.0% | | | | | | | | | | | | |
| 1848 | Stacy G. Potts | 8,382 | 45.9% | ✓ William A. Newell | 9,877 | 54.1% | | | | | | | | | | | | | | | |
| 1852 | ✓ Charles Skelton | 10,229 | 52.2% | William Brown | 9,238 | 47.1% | Daniel Busby (Know Nothing) | 134 | 0.7% | | | | | | | | | | | | |
| 1854 | Nathaniel S. Rue | 7,769 | 42.4% | ✓ George R. Robbins | 10,539 | 57.6% | | | | | | | | | | | | | | | |
| 1856 | James W. Wall | 10,692 | 47.7% | ✓ George R. Robbins | 11,723 | 52.3% | | | | | | | | | | | | | | | |
| 1858 | James W. Wall | 8,767 | 43.3% | ✓ John L. N. Stratton | 11,471 | 56.7% | | | | | | | | | | | | | | | |
| 1860 | Augustus Green | 12,154 | 47.2% | ✓ John L. N. Stratton | 13,582 | 52.8% | | | | | | | | | | | | | | | |
| 1862 | ✓ George Middleton | 12,182 | 52.9% | William Brown | 10,864 | 47.1% | | | | | | | | | | | | | | | |
| 1864 | George Middleton | 13,091 | 48.4% | ✓ William A. Newell | 13,953 | 51.6% | | | | | | | | | | | | | | | |
| 1866 | ✓ Charles Haight | 13,825 | 50.6% | William A. Newell | 13,476 | 49.4% | | | | | | | | | | | | | | | |
| 1868 | ✓ Charles Haight | 16,309 | 51.3% | James F. Rusling | 15,494 | 48.7% | | | | | | | | | | | | | | | |
| 1870 | ✓ Samuel C. Forker | 15,899 | 50.7% | William A. Newell | 15,452 | 49.3% | | | | | | | | | | | | | | | |
| 1872 | Samuel C. Forker | 11,787 | 45.4% | ✓ Samuel A. Dobbins | 14,192 | 54.6% | | | | | | | | | | | | | | | |
| 1874 | Andrew J. Smith | 13,011 | 48.2% | ✓ Samuel A. Dobbins | 13,977 | 51.8% | | | | | | | | | | | | | | | |
| 1876 | Hezekiah B. Smith | 15,485 | 49.2% | ✓ John Howard Pugh | 16,015 | 50.8% | | | | | | | | | | | | | | | |
| 1878 | ✓ Hezekiah B. Smith | 14,610 | 50.6% | John Howard Pugh | 18,580 | 47.4% | Charles E. Baker (National Prohibition) | 568 | 2.0% | | | | | | | | | | | | |
| 1880 | Hezekiah B. Smith | 16,536 | 46.6% | ✓ J. Hart Brewer | 18,580 | 52.4% | Samuel A. Dobbins (Greenback) | 342 | 1.0% | | | | | | | | | | | | |
| 1882 | Lewis Parker | 14,535 | 47.8% | ✓ J. Hart Brewer | 15,604 | 51.3% | Edward T. Howland (Greenback) | 270 | 0.9% | | | | | | | | | | | | |
| 1884 | Franklin Gauntt | 16,853 | 45.4% | ✓ James Buchanan | 19,144 | 51.5% | Henry B. Howell (National Prohibition) | 898 | 2.4% | Samuel A. Dobbins (Greenback) | 271 | 0.7% | | | | | | | | | |
| 1886 | Elias S. Reed | 15,065 | 42.6% | ✓ James Buchanan | 17,767 | 50.2% | Leonard Brown (National Prohibition) | 2,547 | 7.2% | | | | | | | | | | | | |
| 1888 | Chauncey H. Beasley | 19,104 | 44.6% | ✓ James Buchanan | 22,407 | 52.4% | Minot C. Morgan (National Prohibition) | 1,292 | 3.0% | | | | | | | | | | | | |
| 1890 | Wilson D. Haven | 16,352 | 46.6% | ✓ James Buchanan | 17,515 | 50.0% | Leonard Brown (National Prohibition) | 1,200 | 3.4% | | | | | | | | | | | | |
| 1892 | George D. Wetherill | 20,592 | 45.9% | ✓ John J. Gardner | 22,716 | 50.6% | F. French (National Prohibition) | 1,348 | 3.0% | D. Duroe (People's) | 169 | 0.4 | | | | | | | | | |
| 1894 | Martin L. Haines | 12,900 | 34.45% | ✓ John J. Gardner | 22,641 | 60.5% | Jacob D. Joslin (National Prohibition) | 1,278 | 3.4% | William B. Ellis (People's) | 630 | 1.7 | | | | | | | | | |
| 1896 | Abraham E. Conrow | 13,969 | 29.3% | ✓ John J. Gardner | 31,418 | 66.0% | R. Lowber Temple (National Democratic) | 1,076 | 2.3% | J. Bailie Adams (National Prohibition) | 1,036 | 2.2% | George Yardley (Socialist Labor) | 115 | 0.2 | | | | | | |
| 1898 | John F. Hall | 17,367 | 40.5% | ✓ John J. Gardner | 24,035 | 56.1% | Joseph J. Currie (National Prohibition) | 1,294 | 3.0% | John P. Weigel (Socialist Labor) | 153 | 0.4 | | | | | | | | | |
| 1900 | Thomas J. Prickett | 17,351 | 34.3% | ✓ John J. Gardner | 31,359 | 61.9% | Harry S. Powell (National Prohibition) | 1,419 | 2.8% | J. Louis Pancoast (Social Democratic) | 418 | 0.8% | Emil F. Wegener (Socialist Labor) | 75 | 0.1% | | | | | | |
| 1902 | Thomas A. Gash | 9,465 | 29.6% | ✓ John J. Gardner | 19,966 | 62.5% | Marion R. Owen (National Prohibition) | 2,323 | 7.3% | Daniel W. Davis (Socialist Labor) | 199 | 0.6% | | | | | | | | | |
| 1904 | Samuel E. Perry | 13,035 | 34.2% | ✓ John J. Gardner | 26,296 | 59.7% | Thomas H. Landon (National Prohibition) | 1,406 | 4.0% | Robert W. Buckley (Socialist) | 254 | 2.1% | Marion R. Owen (People's Dem.) | 209 | 2.1% | | | | | | |
| 1906 | Samuel E. Perry | 8,921 | 28.6% | ✓ John J. Gardner | 19,637 | 63.0% | William Riddle (Labor & Lincoln) | 1,249 | 4.0% | W. F. Tower (National Prohibition) | 900 | 2.9% | Morris Korshet (Socialist) | 380 | 1.2% | Marion R. Owen (Home Rule) | 105 | 0.3% | | | |
| 1908 | Edward Burd Grubb | 20,506 | 44.8% | ✓ John J. Gardner | 23,906 | 52.2% | James E. Steelman (National Prohibition) | 1,012 | 2.2% | John B. Leeds (Socialist) | 347 | 0.8% | | | | | | | | | |
| 1910 | George Hampton | 16,915 | 38.2% | ✓ John J. Gardner | 22,861 | 51.6% | William Riddle (Independent Labor) | 3,508 | 7.9% | John W. Hughes (National Prohibition) | 738 | 1.7% | George S. Rawcliffe (Socialist) | 295 | 0.7% | | | | | | |
| 1912 | ✓ J. Thompson Baker | 16,130 | 45.0% | John J. Gardner | 12,330 | 34.4% | Francis D. Potter (Progressive) | 7,384 | 20.6% | | | | | | | | | | | | |
| 1914 | J. Thompson Baker | 14,352 | 35.2% | ✓ Isaac Bacharach | 21,448 | 52.6% | William H. Bright (Progressive Roosevelt) | 3,508 | 8.6% | James Chapman (National Prohibition) | 775 | 1.9% | G. A. McKeon (Socialist) | 673 | 1.7% | | | | | | |
| 1916 | William Myers | 14,220 | 34.2% | ✓ Isaac Bacharach | 24,865 | 59.7% | J. Ward Gamble (National Prohibition) | 1,654 | 4.0% | Abraham Warren (Socialist) | 880 | 2.1% | | | | | | | | | |
| 1918 | John T. French | 8,610 | 28.2% | ✓ Isaac Bacharach | 20,744 | 67.9% | Levi B. Sharp (National Prohibition) | 1,206 | 3.9% | | | | | | | | | | | | |
| 1920 | William E. Jonah | 21,511 | 29.5% | ✓ Isaac Bacharach | 51,006 | 70.0% | George E. Strother (Socialist) | 331 | 0.5% | | | | | | | | | | | | |
| 1922 | Charles S. Stevens | 22,001 | 30.2% | ✓ Isaac Bacharach | 50,925 | 69.8% | | | | | | | | | | | | | | | |
| 1924 | Charles S. Stevens | 21,185 | 23.8% | ✓ Isaac Bacharach | 67,668 | 76.2% | | | | | | | | | | | | | | | |
| 1926 | Frank Melville | 12,775 | 19.4% | ✓ Isaac Bacharach | 53,174 | 80.6% | | | | | | | | | | | | | | | |
| 1928 | George R. Greis | 30,856 | 23.7% | ✓ Isaac Bacharach | 99,109 | 76.3% | | | | | | | | | | | | | | | |
| 1930 | Hans Froelicher Jr. | 17,125 | 20.1% | ✓ Isaac Bacharach | 67,729 | 79.7% | Florian Ambroseh (Communist) | 155 | 0.2% | | | | | | | | | | | | |
| 1932 | Harry R. Coulomb | 35,257 | 36.4% | ✓ Isaac Bacharach | 60,963 | 62.9% | Albert H. Schreiber (Socialist-Labor) | 413 | 0.4% | Walter L. Yerkes (Prohibition) | 292 | 0.3% | | | | | | | | | |
| 1934 | Charles W. Ackley | 48,743 | 49.3% | ✓ Isaac Bacharach | 49,824 | 50.4% | Franklin L. Watkins (Socialist-Labor) | 226 | 0.2% | | | | | | | | | | | | |
| 1936 | ✓ Elmer H. Wene | 55,580 | 50.0% | Isaac Bacharach | 50,958 | 45.8% | Ted Lenore (Townsend Nonpartisan) | 3,241 | 2.9% | U. G. Robinson (Prop. Home Protection) | 1,206 | 1.1% | Franklin L. Watkins (Socialist) | 97 | 0.1% | Frank A. Yacovelli (Townsend Social Justice) | 86 | 0.1% | Thomas F. Ogilvie (End Poverty Const) | 18 | <0.1% |
| 1938 | Elmer H. Wene | 55,344 | 49.1% | ✓ Walter S. Jeffries | 57,090 | 50.1% | Isaac Stalberg (Roosevelt Liberal Independent) | 222 | 0.2% | Margaret V. Moody (National Prohibition) | 91 | 0.1% | Anthon B. Ferretti (Independent Peoples) | 47 | <0.1% | Frank B. Hubin (Roosevelt Independent) | 23 | <0.1% | | | |
| 1940 | ✓ Elmer H. Wene | 60,392 | 52.4% | Walter S. Jeffries | 54,897 | 47.6% | Joseph B. Sharp (Prohibition) | 35 | <0.1% | | | | | | | | | | | | |
| 1942 | ✓ Elmer H. Wene | 40,478 | 53.0% | Benjamin D. Foulois | 35,930 | 47.0% | | | | | | | | | | | | | | | |
| 1944 | Edison Hedges | 42,862 | 45.6% | ✓ T. Millet Hand | 51,194 | 54.4% | | | | | | | | | | | | | | | |
| 1946 | Edward T. Keeley | 26,740 | 32.9% | ✓ T. Millet Hand | 54,511 | 67.1% | | | | | | | | | | | | | | | |
| 1948 | William E. Stringer | 38,194 | 37.5% | ✓ T. Millet Hand | 62,804 | 61.7% | Thomas F. Ogilvie (Progressive) | 764 | 0.8% | | | | | | | | | | | | |
| 1952 | Charles Edward Rupp | 46,174 | 36.6% | ✓ T. Millet Hand | 79,955 | 63.4% | | | | | | | | | | | | | | | |
| 1954 | Clayton E. Burdick | 37,541 | 36.4% | ✓ T. Millet Hand | 65,551 | 63.6% | Morris Karp (Socialist-Labor) | 56 | 0.1% | | | | | | | | | | | | |
| 1956 | Thomas C. Stewart | 39,383 | 32.0% | ✓ T. Millet Hand | 83,433 | 67.8% | Morris Karp (Socialist-Labor) | 151 | 0.1% | | | | | | | | | | | | |
| 1958 | Joseph G. Hancock | 50,558 | 46.1% | ✓ Milton W. Glenn | 58,621 | 53.4% | Morris Karp (Socialist-Labor) | 547 | 0.5% | | | | | | | | | | | | |
| 1960 | John A. Miller | 59,520 | 43.2% | ✓ Milton W. Glenn | 77,894 | 56.5% | Morris Karp (Socialist-Labor) | 338 | 0.2% | | | | | | | | | | | | |
| 1962 | Paul R. Porreca | 54,317 | 46.7% | ✓ Milton W. Glenn | 61,285 | 52.7% | Elwin Baker (Socialist Labor) | 625 | 0.5% | | | | | | | | | | | | |
| 1964 | ✓ Thomas C. McGrath Jr. | 73,264 | 50.8% | Milton W. Glenn | 70,997 | 49.2% | | | | | | | | | | | | | | | |
| 1966 | Thomas C. McGrath Jr. | 65,494 | 46.9% | ✓ Charles W. Sandman Jr. | 72,014 | 51.5% | Albert Ronis (Socialist Labor) | 1,259 | 0.9% | Lindwood W. Erickson Jr. (Conservative) | 991 | 0.7% | | | | | | | | | |
| 1968 | David Dichter | 73,361 | 44.4% | ✓ Charles W. Sandman Jr. | 91,218 | 55.3% | Albert Ronis (Socialist Labor) | 505 | 0.3% | | | | | | | | | | | | |
| 1970 | William J. Hughes | 64,882 | 48.3% | ✓ Charles W. Sandman Jr. | 69,392 | 51.7% | | | | | | | | | | | | | | | |
| 1972 | John D. Rose | 69,374 | 34.3% | ✓ Charles W. Sandman Jr. | 133,096 | 65.7% | | | | | | | | | | | | | | | |
| 1974 | ✓ William J. Hughes | 109,763 | 57.3% | Charles W. Sandman Jr. | 79,064 | 41.3% | Andrew Wenger (Independent) | 2,693 | 1.4% | | | | | | | | | | | | |
| 1976 | ✓ William J. Hughes | 141,753 | 61.7% | James R. Hurley | 87,915 | 38.3% | | | | | | | | | | | | | | | |
| 1978 | ✓ William J. Hughes | 112,768 | 66.4% | James H. Biggs | 56,997 | 33.6% | | | | | | | | | | | | | | | |
| 1980 | ✓ William J. Hughes | 135,437 | 57.5% | Beech N. Fox | 97,072 | 41.2% | Robert C. Rothhouse (Libertarian) | 2,262 | 1.0% | Adele Frisch (Socialist Labor) | 939 | 0.4% | | | | | | | | | |
| 1982 | ✓ William J. Hughes | 102,826 | 68.0% | John J. Mahoney | 47,069 | 31.1% | Bruce Powers (Libertarian) | 1,233 | 0.8% | | | | | | | | | | | | |
| 1984 | ✓ William J. Hughes | 132,841 | 63.2% | Raymond G. Massie | 77,231 | 36.8% | | | | | | | | | | | | | | | |
| 1986 | ✓ William J. Hughes | 83,821 | 68.3% | Alfred J. Bennington Jr. | 35,167 | 28.6% | Len Smith (Pro Life, Anti-Abortion) | 3,812 | 3.1% | | | | | | | | | | | | |
| 1988 | ✓ William J. Hughes | 134,505 | 65.7% | Kirk W. Conover | 67,759 | 33.1% | Richard A. Schindewolf Jr. (Pro-Life Conservative) | 2,372 | 1.2% | | | | | | | | | | | | |
| 1990 | ✓ William J. Hughes | 97,698 | 88.2% | (no candidate) | | | William A. Kanengiser (Populist) | 13,120 | 11.8% | | | | | | | | | | | | |
| 1992 | ✓ William J. Hughes | 132,465 | 55.9% | Frank A. LoBiondo | 98,315 | 41.5% | Roger W. Bacon (Libertarian) | 2,575 | 1.1% | Joseph Ponczek (Anti-Tax) | 2,067 | 0.9% | Andrea Lippi (Freedom, Equality, Prosperity) | 1,605 | 0.7% | | | | | | |
| 1994 | Louis N. Magazzu | 56,151 | 35.4% | ✓ Frank A. LoBiondo | 102,566 | 64.6% | | | | | | | | | | | | | | | |
| 1996 | Ruth Katz | 83,890 | 38.0% | ✓ Frank A. LoBiondo | 133,131 | 60.3% | David Rodger Headrick (Independent) | 1,439 | 0.7% | Judith Lee Azaren (Independent) | 1,174 | 0.5% | Andrea Lippi (Independent) | 1,084 | 0.5% | | | | | | |
| 1998 | Derek Hunsberger | 43,563 | 30.8% | ✓ Frank A. LoBiondo | 93,248 | 65.9% | Glenn Campbell (Independent) | 2,955 | 2.1% | Mary A. Whittam (Independent) | 1,748 | 1.2% | | | | | | | | | |
| 2000 | Edward G. Janosik | 74,632 | 31.9% | ✓ Frank A. LoBiondo | 155,187 | 66.4% | Robert Gabrielsky (Independent) | 3,252 | 1.4% | Constantino Rozzo (Independent) | 788 | 0.3% | | | | | | | | | |
| 2002 | Steven A. Farkas | 47,735 | 28.3% | ✓ Frank A. LoBiondo | 116,834 | 69.2% | Roger Merle (Green) | 1,739 | 1.0% | Michael J. Matthews Jr. (Libertarian) | 1,720 | 1.0% | Costantino Rozzo (Socialist Party USA) | 771 | 0.5% | | | | | | |
| 2004 | Timothy J. Robb | 86,792 | 32.7% | ✓ Frank A. LoBiondo | 172,779 | 65.1% | Willie Norwood (Jobs Equality Business) | 1,993 | 0.8% | Michael J. Matthews Jr. (Libertarian) | 1,767 | 0.7% | Jose David Alcantara (Green) | 1,516 | 0.6% | Costantino Rozzo (Socialist Party USA) | 595 | 0.2% | | | |
| 2006 | Viola Thomas-Hughes | 64,277 | 35.6% | ✓ Frank A. LoBiondo | 111,245 | 61.6% | Robert E. Mullock (Preserve Green Space) | 3,071 | 1.7% | Lynn Merle (A New Direction) | 992 | 0.5% | Thomas Fanslau (We The People) | 603 | 0.3% | Willie Norwood (Socialist) | 385 | 0.2% | | | |
| 2008 | David C. Kurkowski | 110,990 | 39.1% | ✓ Frank A. LoBiondo | 167,701 | 59.1% | Jason M. Grover (Green) | 1,763 | 0.6% | Peter Frank Boyce (Constitution) | 1,551 | 0.5% | Gary Stein (Rock the Boat) | 1,312 | 0.5% | Costantino Rozzo (Socialist Party USA) | 648 | 0.2% | | | |
| 2010 | Gary Stein | 51,690 | 30.9% | ✓ Frank A. LoBiondo | 109,460 | 65.5% | Peter Frank Boyce (Constitution) | 4,120 | 2.5% | Mark Lovett (marklovett.us) | 1,123 | 0.7% | Vitov Valdes-Munoz (American Labor) | 727 | 0.4% | | | | | | |
| 2012 | Cassandra Shober | 116,463 | 40.3% | ✓ Frank A. LoBiondo | 166,679 | 57.7% | John Ordille (Libertarian) | 2,699 | 0.9% | Charles Lukens (Constitutional Conservative) | 1,329 | 0.5% | David W. Bowen Sr. (The People's Agenda) | 1,010 | 0.3% | Frank Faralli Jr. (Conservative, Compassionate, Creative) | 892 | 0.3% | | | |
| 2014 | Bill Hughes Jr. | 62,986 | 37.0% | ✓ Frank A. LoBiondo | 104,958 | 61.7% | Alexander H. Spano (Democratic-Republican (New)) | 637 | 0.4% | Gary Stein (Various slogans) | 575 | 0.3% | Costantino Rozzo (American Labor (New)) | 473 | 0.3% | Bayode Olabisi (Making Us Better) | 447 | 0.3% | | | |
| 2016 | David Cole | 110,838 | 37.2% | ✓ Frank A. LoBiondo | 176,338 | 59.2% | John Ordille (Libertarian) | 3,773 | 1.3% | James Keenan (Make Government Work) | 2,653 | 0.9% | Steven Fenichel (Representing the 99%) | 1,574 | 0.5% | Eric Beechwood (People's Independent Progressive) | 1,387 | 0.5% | Gabriel Brian Franco (For Political Revolution) | 1,232 | 0.4% |
| 2018 | ✓ Jeff Van Drew | 125,755 | 52.3% | Seth Grossman | 110,491 | 45.9 | John Ordille (Libertarian) | 1,631 | 0.6% | Steven Fenichel (Time for Truth) | 1,046 | 0.4% | Anthony Parisi Sanchez (Cannot Be Bought) | 964 | 0.4% | William R. Benfer (Independent) | 816 | 0.4% | | | |
| 2020 | Amy Kennedy | 173,849 | 46.2% | ✓ Jeff Van Drew | 195,526 | 51.9% | Jenna Harvey (Independent) | 4,136 | 1.1% | Jesse Ehrnstrom (Libertarian) | 3,036 | 0.8% | | | | | | | | | |
| 2022 | Tim Alexander | 94,522 | 40.0% | ✓ Jeff Van Drew | 139,217 | 58.9% | Michael Gallo (Independent) | 1,825 | 0.8% | Anthony Parisi Sanchez (Independent) | 920 | 0.4% | | | | | | | | | |
| 2024 | Joe Salerno | 153,117 | 41.2% | ✓ Jeff Van Drew | 215,946 | 58.1% | Thomas Cannavo (Green) | 2,557 | 0.7% | | | | | | | | | | | | |
