= Elmer H. Wene =

American politician (1892–1957)

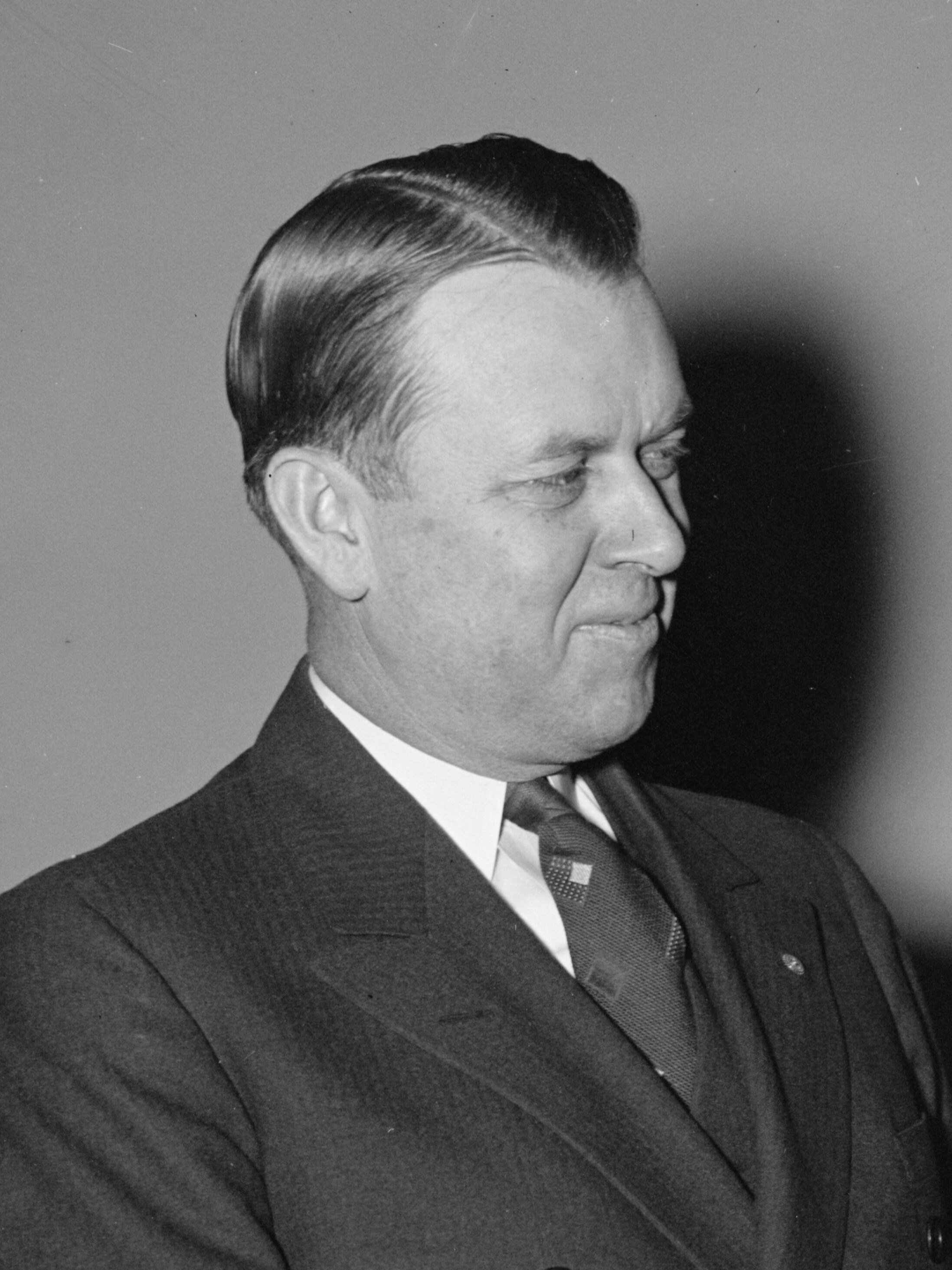
- Wene in 1937

Member of the New Jersey Senate from Cumberland County
- In office 1947–1950
- Preceded by: George H. Stanger
- Succeeded by: W. Howard Sharp

Member of the U.S. House of Representatives from New Jersey's 2nd district
- In office January 3, 1937 – January 3, 1939
- Preceded by: Isaac Bacharach
- Succeeded by: Walter S. Jeffries
- In office January 3, 1941 – January 3, 1945
- Preceded by: Walter S. Jeffries
- Succeeded by: T. Millet Hand

Member of the Board of Chosen Freeholders of Cumberland County, New Jersey
- In office 1939–1941

Member of the New Jersey State Board of Agriculture
- In office 1925–1934

Personal details
- Born: May 1, 1892 Pittstown, New Jersey, U.S.
- Died: January 25, 1957 (aged 64) Philadelphia, Pennsylvania, U.S.
- Resting place: Locust Grove Cemetery, Quakertown, New Jersey, US
- Party: Democratic
- Parent(s): Emanuel S. Wene; Mary J. Kiley
- Education: New Jersey State Agricultural College
- Profession: Politician

Elmer Hartpence Wene (May 1, 1892 – January 25, 1957) was an American Democratic Party politician who represented New Jersey's 2nd congressional district in the United States House of Representatives from 1937 to 1939 and again from 1941 to 1945. He twice ran unsuccessfully for the New Jersey governorship.

== Biography ==
He was born on a farm near Pittstown, New Jersey, on May 1, 1892, to Emanuel S. Wene and Mary J. Kiley. He attended the public schools and Rutgers University in New Brunswick, New Jersey. Wene graduated from New Jersey State Agricultural College with a degree in Poultry husbandry on March 4, 1914. In 1918, he engaged in agricultural pursuits near Vineland, New Jersey.

Wene served on the New Jersey State Board of Agriculture 1925-1934 and was elected as a Democrat to the Seventy-fifth Congress (January 3, 1937 – January 3, 1939). He was an unsuccessful candidate for reelection in 1938 to the Seventy-sixth Congress. After leaving Congress, he was a member of the Board of Chosen Freeholders of Cumberland County, New Jersey 1939-1941. He was again elected to the Seventy-seventh and Seventy-eighth Congresses (January 3, 1941 – January 3, 1945) but was not a candidate for renomination in 1944. Wene was an unsuccessful candidate for election to the United States Senate the same year.

Wene resumed agricultural pursuits and poultry raising. He was also president and owner of two radio stations in New Jersey. In 1945, he served as an adviser to the Secretary of Agriculture. He was elected to the New Jersey Senate in 1946 and a delegate to the New Jersey State constitutional convention in 1947 that drafted the current New Jersey State Constitution. On June 26, 1948, he was given a recess appointment by President Harry S. Truman as Undersecretary of Agriculture. He was an unsuccessful Democratic candidate for Governor of New Jersey in 1949 and an unsuccessful candidate for election in 1950 to the Eighty-second Congress as well. Wene was unsuccessful for the gubernatorial nomination in 1953.

He died of cancer at the University of Pennsylvania Hospital in Philadelphia, Pennsylvania, on January 25, 1957. He had never married or had children. He was buried in Locust Grove Cemetery, Quakertown, New Jersey.

== Electoral history ==
=== United States House of Representatives ===
United States House of Representatives elections, 1950
Party	Candidate	Votes	%	±%
Republican	T. Millet Hand (incumbent)	54,897	54.34	▼7.38
Democratic	Elmer H. Wene	46,121	45.66	
Total votes		101,018	100.0	
Republican hold				

United States House of Representatives elections, 1942
Party	Candidate	Votes	%	±%
Democratic	Elmer H. Wene (incumbent)	40,478	52.98	▲0.83
Republican	Benjamin D. Foulois	35,930	47.02	
Total votes		76,408	100.0	
Democratic hold				

United States House of Representatives elections, 1940
Party	Candidate	Votes	%	±%
Democratic	Elmer H. Wene	60,392	52.15	▲3.09
Republican	Walter S. Jeffries (incumbent)	55,382	47.82	▼1.24
Prohibition	Joseph B. Sharp	35	0.03	
Total votes		115,809	100.0	
Democratic gain from Republican				

United States House of Representatives elections, 1938
Party	Candidate	Votes	%	±%
Republican	Walter S. Jeffries	57,090	50.60	
Democratic	Elmer H. Wene (incumbent)	55344	49.06	▼0.93
Roosevelt Liberal Independent	Isaac Stalberg	222	0.20	
Prohibition	Margaret V. Moody	91	0.08	
Independent People's	Anthon B. Ferretti	47	0.04	
Roosevelt Independent	Frank B. Hubin	23	0.02	
Total votes		112,817	100.0	
Republican gain from Democratic				

United States House of Representatives elections, 1936
Party	Candidate	Votes	%	±%
Democratic	Elmer H. Wene	55,580	49.99	
Republican	Isaac Bacharach (incumbent)	50958	45.83	▼4.60
Union	Ted Lenore	3,241	2.91	
Property Home Protection	U. G. Robinson	1,206	1.08	
Socialist	Franklin L. Watkins	97	0.09	▼0.14
National Union for Social Justice	Frank A. Yacovelli	86	0.08	
End Poverty	Thomas F. Ogilvie	17	0.02	
Total votes		111,185	100.0	
Democratic gain from Republican				

U.S. House of Representatives
Preceded by Isaac Bacharach	Member of the U.S. House of Representatives from New Jersey's 2nd congressional district January 3, 1937 – January 3, 1939	Succeeded by Walter S. Jeffries
Preceded by Walter S. Jeffries	Member of the U.S. House of Representatives from New Jersey's 2nd congressional district January 3, 1941 – January 3, 1945	Succeeded by T. Millet Hand
Party political offices
Preceded by James H. R. Cromwell	Democratic Nominee for the U.S. Senate (Class 1) from New Jersey; 1944	Succeeded by George E. Brunner
Preceded by Lewis G. Hansen	Democratic Nominee for Governor of New Jersey; 1949	Succeeded by Robert B. Meyner
