= Thomas C. McGrath Jr. =

American politician

Thomas C. McGrath
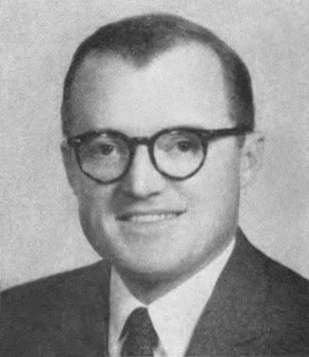

Member of the U.S. House of Representatives from New Jersey's 2nd district
- In office January 3, 1965 – January 3, 1967
- Preceded by: Milton W. Glenn
- Succeeded by: Charles W. Sandman Jr.

Personal details
- Born: Thomas Charles McGrath Jr. April 22, 1927 Philadelphia, Pennsylvania, U.S.
- Died: January 15, 1994 (aged 66) Delray Beach, Florida, U.S.
- Party: Democratic
- Education: Saint Joseph's Preparatory School; University of Notre Dame
- Alma mater: United States Naval Academy; University of Pennsylvania Law School
- Profession: Politician

Military service
- Allegiance: United States
- Branch/service: United States Navy
- Years of service: 1945; 1950-1954

Thomas Charles McGrath Jr. (April 22, 1927, Philadelphia, Pennsylvania – January 15, 1994, Delray Beach, Florida) was an American naval officer, lawyer, and Democratic Party politician who represented New Jersey's 2nd congressional district in the United States House of Representatives for one term from 1965 to 1967.

== Biography ==
He was born on April 22, 1927, in Philadelphia, Pennsylvania, and he graduated from Saint Joseph's Preparatory School in Philadelphia in 1944 and attended the University of Notre Dame from 1944 to 1945.

=== Military service ===
He served in the United States Navy as an enlisted man, June 1945 to November 1945 and graduated from the United States Naval Academy, Annapolis, Maryland, in 1950, and then served in the Atlantic and Pacific Fleets from 1950 to 1954.

=== Early career ===
He graduated from the University of Pennsylvania Law School in 1957, was admitted to the bar in 1958 and practiced law in Philadelphia until 1963. He was a deputy attorney general of New Jersey in 1964 and practiced law in Atlantic City, New Jersey, from 1964 to 1965.

=== Congress ===
In his first bid for elective office, McGrath was elected as a Democrat to the Eighty-ninth Congress, defeating four-term Republican Party incumbent Milton W. Glenn. He served in office from January 3, 1965, to January 3, 1967, and was an unsuccessful candidate for reelection in 1966 to the Ninetieth Congress.

=== Later career ===
After leaving Congress, McGrath was general counsel at the Department of Housing and Urban Development from 1967 to 1969; Treasurer of the New Jersey Democratic State Committee from 1969 to 1973 and a consultant in the construction and finance industry from 1969 to 1992.

=== Death ===
McGrath was a resident of Margate City, New Jersey, and Juno Beach, Florida, until his death in Delray Beach, Florida, on January 15, 1994.

== Electoral history ==
=== United States House of Representatives ===
United States House of Representatives elections, 1966
| Party | Candidate | Votes | % | ±% |
|---|---|---|---|---|
| Republican | Charles W. Sandman Jr. | 72,014 | 51.53 | |
| Democratic | Thomas C. McGrath Jr. (incumbent) | 65494 | 46.86 | ▼2.35 |
| Socialist Labor | Albert Ronis | 1,259 | 0.9 | |
| Conservative | Linwood W. Erickson, Jr. | 991 | 0.71 | |
| Total votes | | 139,758 | 100.0 | |
| Republican gain from Democratic | | | | |

United States House of Representatives elections, 1964
| Party | Candidate | Votes | % | ±% |
|---|---|---|---|---|
| Democratic | Thomas C. McGrath Jr. | 73,264 | 50.79 | |
| Republican | Milton W. Glenn (incumbent) | 70997 | 49.21 | ▼3.52 |
| Total votes | | 144,261 | 100.0 | |
| Democratic gain from Republican | | | | |

U.S. House of Representatives
| Preceded by Milton W. Glenn | Member of the U.S. House of Representatives from New Jersey's 2nd congressional district January 3, 1965 – January 3, 1967 | Succeeded by Charles W. Sandman Jr. |
