= T. Millet Hand =

American politician

Thomas M. Hand
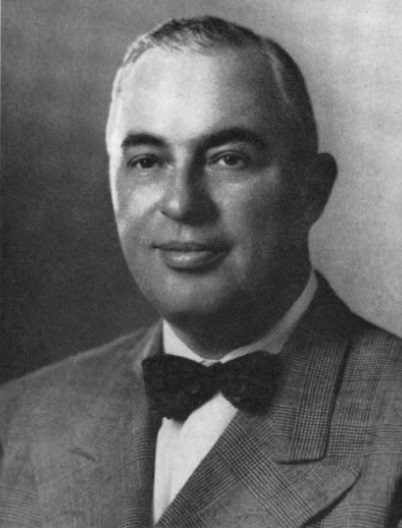
- Frontispiece of 1957's Thomas Millet Hand, Late a Representative

Member of the U.S. House of Representatives from New Jersey's 2nd district
- In office January 3, 1945 – December 26, 1956
- Preceded by: Elmer H. Wene
- Succeeded by: Milton W. Glenn

Solicitor of Lower Township
- In office 1945–1950
- Preceded by: Samuel F. Eldredge
- Succeeded by: Charles W. Sandman Jr.

Vice-chairman of the New Jersey Republican Party
- In office 1941–1944

Mayor of Cape May
- In office 1937–1944

Prosecutor of the Pleas of Cape May County
- In office 1928–1933

Personal details
- Born: Thomas Millet Hand; July 7, 1902 Cape May, New Jersey, U.S.
- Died: December 26, 1956 (aged 54) Cold Spring, New Jersey, U.S.
- Resting place: Cold Spring Presbyterian Cemetery
- Party: Republican
- Education: Dickinson School of Law
- Profession: Politician

Thomas Millet Hand (July 7, 1902 in Cape May, New Jersey – December 26, 1956 in Cold Spring, New Jersey) was an American lawyer and Republican Party politician who represented New Jersey's 2nd congressional district in the United States House of Representatives for six consecutive terms from 1945 to 1956.

== Early life and education ==
Hand was born in Cape May, New Jersey on July 7, 1902, and attended the local public schools. He graduated in 1922 from the Dickinson School of Law, in Carlisle, Pennsylvania, was admitted to the New Jersey Bar Association in 1924 and commenced practice in Cape May.

== Political and business career ==
He was clerk of the Cape May County, New Jersey Board of Chosen Freeholders from 1924 to 1928, and the prosecutor of the pleas of Cape May County from 1928 to 1933. Hand served as the mayor of Cape May from 1937 to 1944, and was the publisher of the Cape May Star and Wave from 1940 until his death. He was also a partner in the Mecray-Hand Co., a real estate and insurance business.

== Congress ==
Hand was elected as a Republican to the Seventy-ninth and to the five succeeding Congresses and had been reelected on November 6, 1956, to the Eighty-fifth Congress. He served in the House from January 3, 1945, until his death.

== Death ==
Hand died of a heart attack at his home in the Cold Spring section of Lower Township, New Jersey on December 26, 1956.

His remains were cremated at Ewing Cemetery in Trenton, New Jersey and interred in Cold Spring Presbyterian Cemetery in Cold Spring, New Jersey.

== Electoral history ==
=== United States House of Representatives ===
United States House of Representatives elections, 1956
Party	Candidate	Votes	%	±%
Republican	T. Millet Hand (incumbent)	83,433	67.85	▲4.3
Democratic	Thomas C. Stewart	39,383	32.03	
Socialist Labor	Morris Karp	151	0.12	▲0.07
Total votes		122,967	100.0	
Republican hold				

United States House of Representatives elections, 1954
Party	Candidate	Votes	%	±%
Republican	T. Millet Hand (incumbent)	65,551	63.55	▲0.16
Democratic	Clayton E. Burdick	37,541	36.40	
Socialist Labor	Morris Karp	56	0.05	
Total votes		103,148	100.0	
Republican hold				

United States House of Representatives elections, 1952
Party	Candidate	Votes	%	±%
Republican	T. Millet Hand (incumbent)	79,955	63.39	▲9.05
Democratic	Charles Edward Rupp	46,174	36.61	
Total votes		126,129	100.0	
Republican hold				

United States House of Representatives elections, 1950
Party	Candidate	Votes	%	±%
Republican	T. Millet Hand (incumbent)	54,897	54.34	▼7.38
Democratic	Elmer H. Wene	46,121	45.66	
Total votes		101,018	100.0	
Republican hold				

United States House of Representatives elections, 1948
Party	Candidate	Votes	%	±%
Republican	T. Millet Hand (incumbent)	62,804	61.72	▼5.37
Democratic	William E. Stringer	38,194	37.53	
Progressive	Thomas F. Ogilvie	764	0.75	
Total votes		101,762	100.0	
Republican hold				

United States House of Representatives elections, 1946
Party	Candidate	Votes	%
Republican	T. Millet Hand	54,511	67.09
Democratic	Edward T. Keeley	26,740	32.91
Total votes		81,251	100.0

== See also ==
- List of members of the United States Congress who died in office (1950–1999)

== Notes ==
U.S. House of Representatives
Preceded by Elmer H. Wene	Member of the U.S. House of Representatives from New Jersey's 2nd congressional district January 3, 1945 – December 26, 1956	Succeeded by Milton W. Glenn
