= Walter S. Jeffries =

American politician

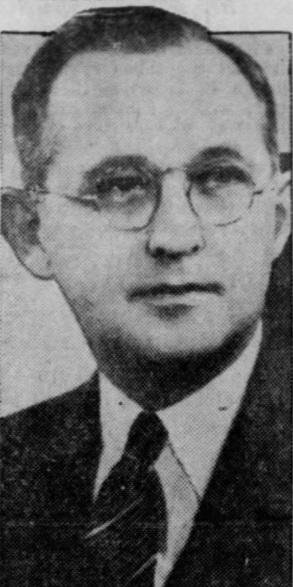
- The Oshkosh Northwestern (Oshkosh, WI), September 30, 1938

Treasurer of Atlantic County
- In office 1941–1944
- Preceded by: Enoch L. Johnson

Member of the U.S. House of Representatives from New Jersey's 2nd district
- In office January 3, 1939 – January 3, 1941
- Preceded by: Elmer H. Wene
- Succeeded by: Elmer H. Wene

Sheriff of Atlantic County
- In office 1935–1938

Mayor of Margate City
- In office 1931–1935

Personal details
- Born: Walter Sooy Jeffries; October 16, 1893 Atlantic City, New Jersey, US
- Died: October 11, 1954 (aged 60) Margate City, New Jersey, US
- Resting place: Laurel Memorial Cemetery, Egg Harbor Township, New Jersey, US
- Party: Republican
- Profession: Paint manufacturer

Walter Sooy Jeffries (October 16, 1893, Atlantic City, New Jersey – October 11, 1954, Margate City, New Jersey) was an American businessman and Republican Party politician who represented New Jersey's 2nd congressional district in the United States House of Representatives for one term from 1939 to 1941.

== Biography ==
Jeffries was born in Atlantic City, New Jersey, on October 16, 1893, and attended the local public schools. He graduated from the Atlantic City Business College in 1909 and was also graduated in celestial navigation from the Franklin Institute in Philadelphia in 1943. He engaged in the manufacture of paint from 1910 to 1934.

=== Early career ===
He was elected as mayor of Margate City, New Jersey, from 1931 to 1935 and served as sheriff of Atlantic County, New Jersey, from 1935 to 1938. He became engaged in the hotel business at Atlantic City in 1938.

=== Congress ===
Jeffries was elected as a Republican to the Seventy-sixth Congress, serving in office from January 3, 1939 – January 3, 1941, and was an unsuccessful candidate for reelection in 1940 to the Seventy-seventh Congress.

=== Later career and death ===
After his term in Congress, he was treasurer of Atlantic County from 1941 to 1944. Jeffries died in Margate City on October 11, 1954, and was interred in Laurel Memorial Cemetery in Egg Harbor Township, New Jersey.

== Electoral history ==
=== United States House of Representatives ===
United States House of Representatives elections, 1940
Party	Candidate	Votes	%	±%
Democratic	Elmer H. Wene	60,392	52.15	▲3.09
Republican	Walter S. Jeffries (incumbent)	55,382	47.82	▼1.24
Prohibition	Joseph B. Sharp	35	0.03	
Total votes		115,809	100.0	
Democratic gain from Republican				

United States House of Representatives elections, 1938
Party	Candidate	Votes	%	±%
Republican	Walter S. Jeffries	57,090	50.60	
Democratic	Elmer H. Wene (incumbent)	55344	49.06	▼0.93
Roosevelt Liberal Independent	Isaac Stalberg	222	0.20	
Prohibition	Margaret V. Moody	91	0.08	
Independent People's	Anthon B. Ferretti	47	0.04	
Roosevelt Independent	Frank B. Hubin	23	0.02	
Total votes		112,817	100.0	
Republican gain from Democratic				

U.S. House of Representatives
Preceded by Elmer H. Wene	Member of the U.S. House of Representatives from New Jersey's 2nd congressional district January 3, 1939 – January 3, 1941	Succeeded by Elmer H. Wene
