= Milton W. Glenn =

American politician (1903-1967)

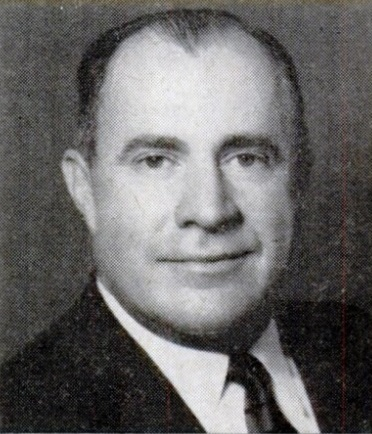
- From 1959's Pocket Congressional Directory of the Eighty-Sixth Congress

Member of the U.S. House of Representatives from New Jersey's 2nd district
- In office November 5, 1957 – January 3, 1965
- Preceded by: T. Millet Hand
- Succeeded by: Thomas C. McGrath Jr.

Member of the New Jersey General Assembly
- In office 1950-1957

Member of the Atlantic County Board of Chosen Freeholders
- In office June 1946 – January 1951

Personal details
- Born: Milton Willits Glenn; June 18, 1903 Atlantic City, New Jersey, U.S.
- Died: December 14, 1967 (aged 64) Delray Beach, Florida, U.S.
- Resting place: West Creek Cemetery
- Party: Republican
- Education: Georgetown University
- Alma mater: Dickinson School of Law
- Profession: Politician

Military service
- Allegiance: United States
- Branch/service: United States Navy
- Years of service: 1943-1946
- Rank: Lieutenant Commander
- Unit: United States Navy Reserve
- Battles/wars: World War II

Milton Willits Glenn (June 18, 1903 – December 14, 1967) was an American lawyer, World War II veteran, and Republican Party politician who represented New Jersey's 2nd congressional district in the United States House of Representatives from 1957 to 1965.

== Biography ==
Glenn attended Atlantic City High School and later Georgetown University in 1921 and 1922 and graduated from Dickinson School of Law in Carlisle, Pennsylvania in 1924. He was admitted to the bar in 1925 and commenced practice in Atlantic City, New Jersey. He was the municipal magistrate in Margate City, from January 1940 to November 1943.

=== World War II ===
During World War II, Glenn was commissioned a lieutenant in the United States Navy and served from November 1943 to June 1946, and subsequently served as a Lieutenant Commander in the United States Naval Reserve.

After the war, he was elected to serve on the Atlantic County Board of Chosen Freeholders from June 1946 to January 1951.

=== Congress ===
He was elected to the New Jersey General Assembly for an unexpired term in 1950, and was reelected in 1951, 1953, and 1955. He was elected as a Republican to the Eighty-fifth Congress to fill the vacancy caused by the death of T. Millet Hand; reelected to the Eighty-sixth, Eighty-seventh and Eighty-eighth Congresses, serving in the House from November 5, 1957, to January 3, 1965. Glenn voted in favor of the Civil Rights Acts of 1960 and 1964, as well as the 24th Amendment to the U.S. Constitution. Glenn was an unsuccessful candidate for reelection in 1964 to the Eighty-ninth Congress, falling to Democrat Thomas C. McGrath Jr., who was making his first run for elective office.

=== Later career and death ===
After leaving Congress, he resumed the practice of law. Glenn died at his home in Margate City, New Jersey, on December 14, 1967. He was interred at West Creek Cemetery in West Creek, New Jersey.

== Electoral history ==
=== United States House of Representatives ===
United States House of Representatives elections, 1964
Party	Candidate	Votes	%	±%
Democratic	Thomas C. McGrath Jr.	73,264	50.79	
Republican	Milton W. Glenn (incumbent)	70997	49.21	▼3.52
Total votes		144,261	100.0	
Democratic gain from Republican				

United States House of Representatives elections, 1962
Party	Candidate	Votes	%	±%
Republican	Milton W. Glenn (incumbent)	61,285	52.73	▼3.82
Democratic	Paul R. Porreca	54,317	46.73	
Socialist Labor	Elvin Baker	625	0.54	
Total votes		116,227	100	
Republican hold				

United States House of Representatives elections, 1960
Party	Candidate	Votes	%	±%
Republican	Milton W. Glenn (incumbent)	77,894	56.55	▲3.13
Democratic	John A. Miller	59,520	43.21	
Socialist Labor	Morris W. Karp	338	0.25	▼0.25
Total votes		137,752	100	
Republican hold				

United States House of Representatives elections, 1958
Party	Candidate	Votes	%	±%
Republican	Milton W. Glenn (incumbent)	58,621	53.42	▼1.39
Democratic	Joseph G. Hancock	50,558	46.08	▲1.16
Socialist Labor	Morris W. Karp	547	0.5	▲0.23
Total votes		109,726	100	
Republican hold				

United States House of Representatives elections, 1957
Party	Candidate	Votes	%
Republican	Milton W. Glenn	58,129	54.81
Democratic	Joseph G. Hancock	47,647	44.92
Socialist Labor	Morris W. Karp	289	0.27
Total votes		106,065	100
Republican hold			

U.S. House of Representatives
Preceded by T. Millet Hand	Member of the U.S. House of Representatives from New Jersey's 2nd congressional district November 5, 1957 – January 3, 1965	Succeeded by Thomas C. McGrath Jr.
