= Margate City, New Jersey =

City in Atlantic County, New Jersey, US

- City
- City of Margate City
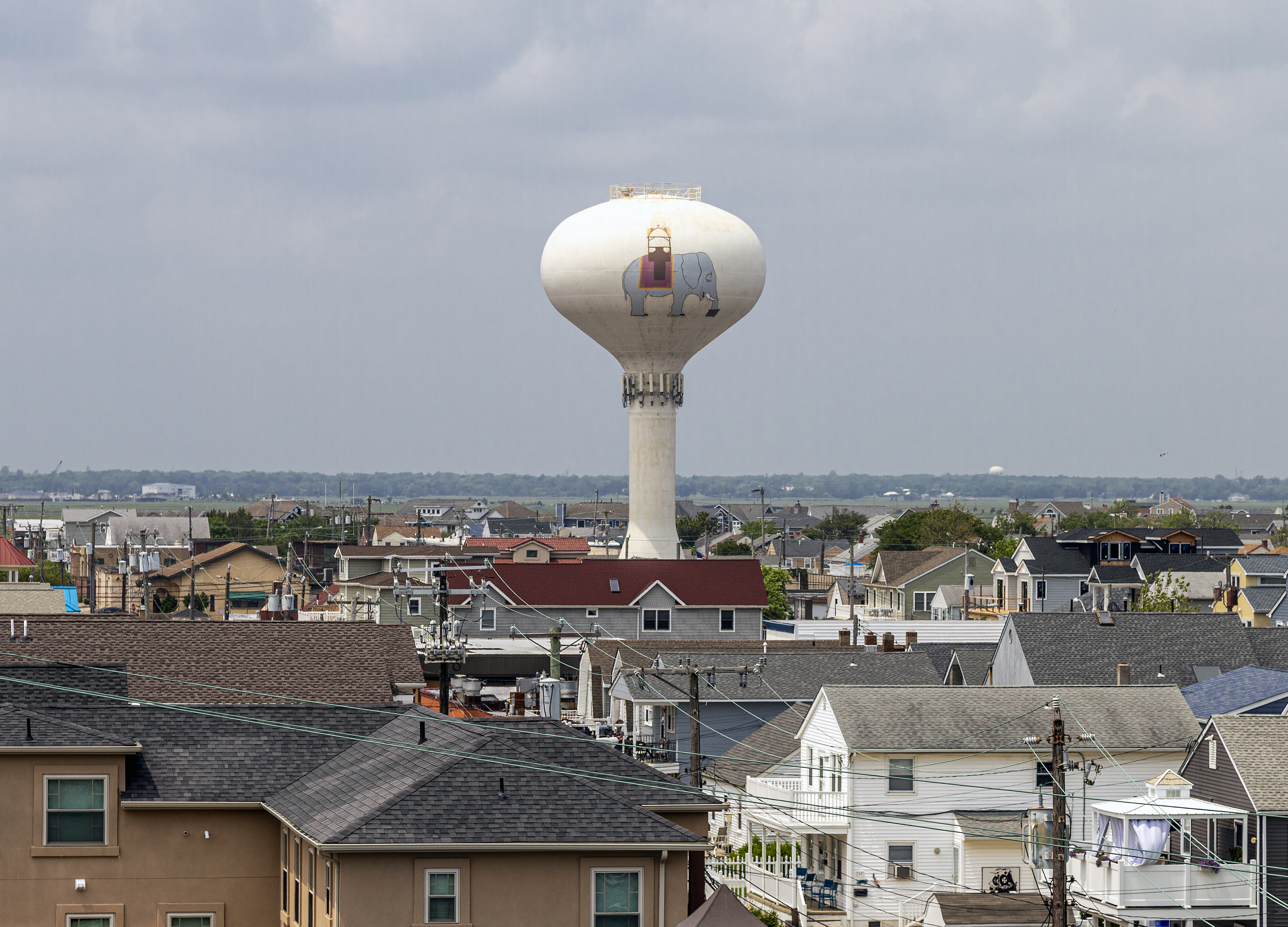
- The water tower in Margate City with Lucy the Elephant painted on the side

- Seal

- Map of Margate City in Atlantic County. Inset: Location of Atlantic County highlighted in the State of New Jersey.

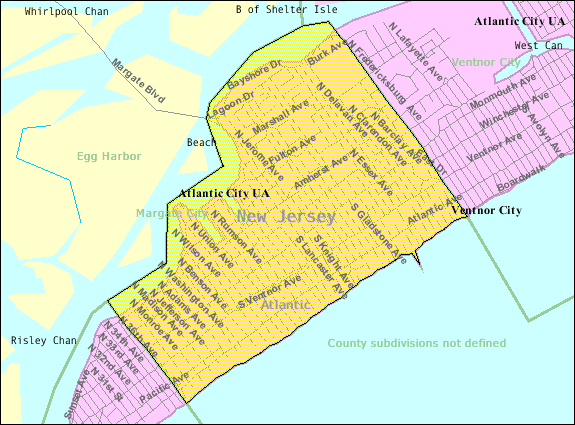
- Census Bureau map of Margate City, New Jersey

- Location in Atlantic County Location in New Jersey Location in the United States
- Coordinates: 39.330913°N 74.506849°W
- Country: United States
- State: New Jersey
- County: Atlantic
- Incorporated: September 7, 1885 (as Borough of South Atlantic City)
- Reincorporated: April 23, 1897 (as city)
- Renamed: April 20, 1909 (as Margate City)
- Named for: Margate, Kent, England

Government
  - Type: Walsh Act
  - Body: Board of Commissioners
  - Mayor: Michael Collins (term ends May 16, 2027)
  - Administrator: Ken Mosca
  - Municipal clerk: Johanna Casey

Area
  - Total: 1.63 sq mi (4.22 km^{2})
  - Land: 1.42 sq mi (3.67 km^{2})
  - Water: 0.22 sq mi (0.56 km^{2}) 13.19%
  - Rank: 435th of 565 in state 22nd of 23 in county
- Elevation: 7 ft (2.1 m)

Population (2020)
  - Total: 5,317
  - Estimate (2023): 5,162
  - Rank: 369th of 565 in state 15th of 23 in county
  - Density: 3,754.9/sq mi (1,449.8/km^{2})
  - Rank: 177th of 565 in state 2nd of 23 in county
- Time zone: UTC−05:00 (Eastern (EST))
  - Summer (DST): UTC−04:00 (Eastern (EDT))
- ZIP Code: 08402
- Area code: 609
- FIPS code: 3400143890
- GNIS feature ID: 0885292
- Website: www.margate-nj.com

Margate City is a city situated on the Jersey Shore on Absecon Island, within Atlantic County, in the U.S. state of New Jersey, on the Atlantic Ocean shoreline. As of the 2020 United States census, the city's population was 5,317, a decrease of 1,037 (−16.3%) from the 2010 census count of 6,354, which in turn had reflected a decline of 1,839 (−22.4%) from the 8,193 counted in the 2000 census. Geographically, the city, and all of Atlantic County, is part of the South Jersey region of the state and of the Atlantic City-Hammonton metropolitan statistical area, which in turn is included in the Philadelphia metropolitan area.

The city is located on Absecon Island, which stretches for 8.1 miles (13.0 km) and is also home of Atlantic City and Ventnor City to the northeast, and Longport on the southwest. The city stretches about eight blocks from the Atlantic Ocean to the bay at most points in town. Margate is a popular Jersey Shore destination, especially during the summer, and is the home of Lucy the Elephant, a 65-foot (20 m)-tall wooden and metal-clad elephant recognized as America’s Oldest Surviving Roadside Attraction and declared a National Historic Landmark in 1976, and of Marven Gardens, of Monopoly board game fame.

== History ==
Margate City was originally incorporated as the borough of South Atlantic City by an act of the New Jersey Legislature on September 7, 1885, from portions of Egg Harbor Township, based on the results of a referendum held on August 1, 1885. South Atlantic City was reincorporated as a city on April 23, 1897, and then reincorporated with the name Margate City on April 20, 1909. The city was named for Margate in Kent, England.

A boardwalk was constructed in 1906. The boardwalk was built close to the Atlantic Ocean, which left it more vulnerable to storm damage than the Atlantic City Boardwalk. Large chunks of the boardwalk were destroyed in the 1944 Great Atlantic hurricane, with the remaining portions lasting until the Ash Wednesday Storm of 1962.

== Geography ==
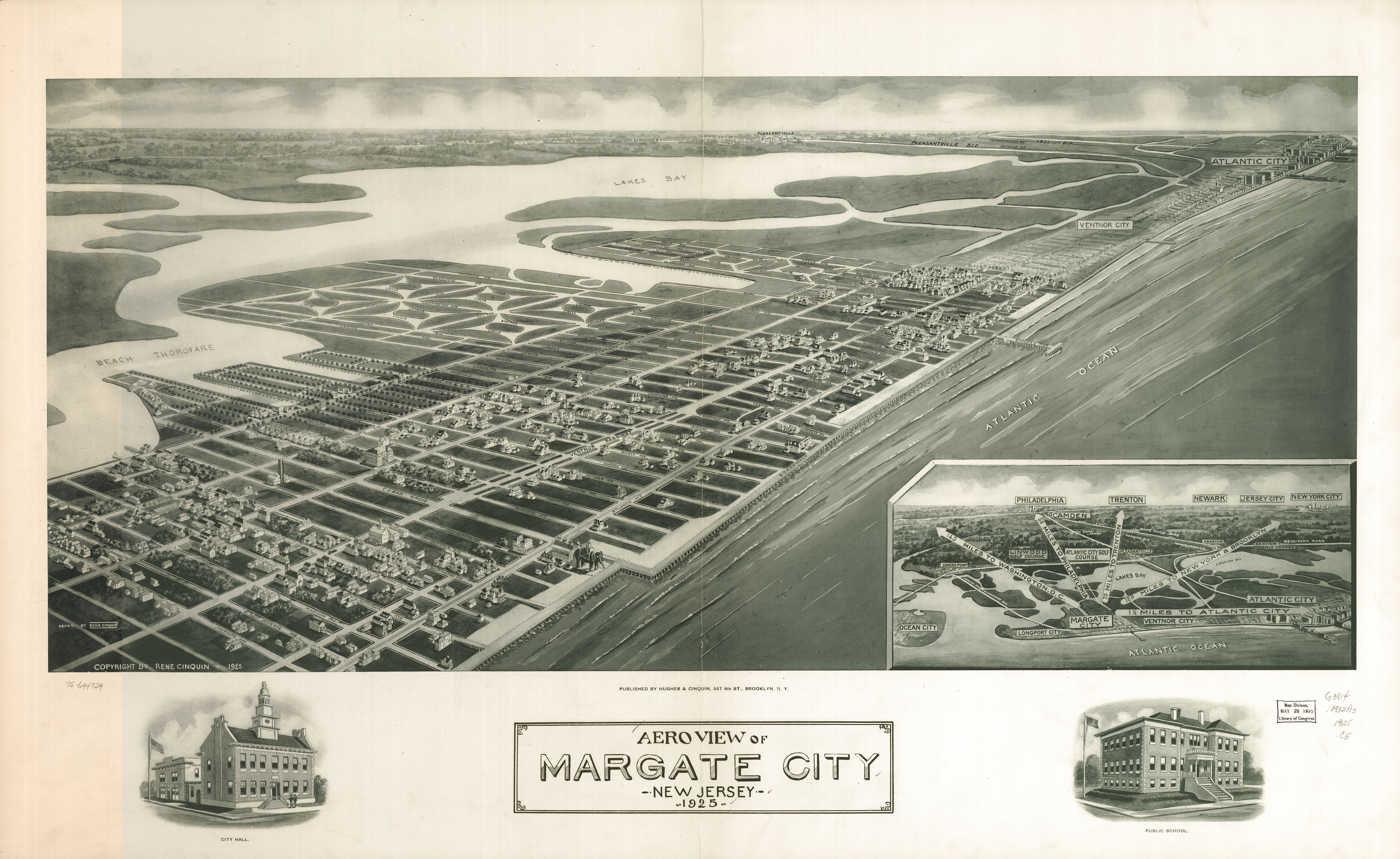
Panoramic map of Margate City (1925)

According to the United States Census Bureau, the city had a total area of 1.63 square miles (4.22 km^{2}), including 1.42 square miles (3.67 km^{2}) of land and 0.22 square miles (0.56 km^{2}) of water (13.19%).

Margate City borders Longport and Ventnor City.

== Demographics ==
Historical population
Census	Pop.	Note	%±
1900	69		—
1910	129		87.0%
1920	249		93.0%
1930	2,913		1,069.9%
1940	3,266		12.1%
1950	4,715		44.4%
1960	9,474		100.9%
1970	10,576		11.6%
1980	9,179		−13.2%
1990	8,431		−8.1%
2000	8,193		−2.8%
2010	6,354		−22.4%
2020	5,317		−16.3%
2023 (est.)	5,162		−2.9%
Population sources: 1900–2000 1900–1920; 1900–1910 1910–1930; 1940–2000 2000; 2010 2020

=== 2020 census ===
As of the 2020 census, Margate City had a population of 5,317. The median age was 58.7 years. 11.4% of residents were under the age of 18 and 37.1% of residents were 65 years of age or older. For every 100 females there were 89.2 males, and for every 100 females age 18 and over there were 86.8 males age 18 and over.

100.0% of residents lived in urban areas, while 0.0% lived in rural areas.

There were 2,651 households in Margate City, of which 13.5% had children under the age of 18 living in them. Of all households, 45.9% were married-couple households, 18.9% were households with a male householder and no spouse or partner present, and 31.2% were households with a female householder and no spouse or partner present. About 38.5% of all households were made up of individuals and 22.5% had someone living alone who was 65 years of age or older.

There were 7,124 housing units, of which 62.8% were vacant. The homeowner vacancy rate was 2.0% and the rental vacancy rate was 13.3%.

Racial composition as of the 2020 census
Race	Number	Percent
White	4,978	93.6%
Black or African American	13	0.2%
American Indian and Alaska Native	7	0.1%
Asian	57	1.1%
Native Hawaiian and Other Pacific Islander	2	0.0%
Some other race	61	1.1%
Two or more races	199	3.7%
Hispanic or Latino (of any race)	183	3.4%

=== 2010 census ===
The 2010 United States census counted 6,354 people, 3,156 households, and 1,805 families in the city. The population density was 4,490.3 per square mile (1,733.7/km^{2}). There were 7,114 housing units at an average density of 5,027.4 per square mile (1,941.1/km^{2}). The racial makeup was 96.36% (6,123) White, 0.71% (45) Black or African American, 0.09% (6) Native American, 0.98% (62) Asian, 0.02% (1) Pacific Islander, 0.72% (46) from other races, and 1.12% (71) from two or more races. Hispanic or Latino of any race were 2.75% (175) of the population.

Of the 3,156 households, 14.6% had children under the age of 18; 45.8% were married couples living together; 8.0% had a female householder with no husband present and 42.8% were non-families. Of all households, 38.0% were made up of individuals and 19.9% had someone living alone who was 65 years of age or older. The average household size was 2.01 and the average family size was 2.64.

14.0% of the population were under the age of 18, 4.7% from 18 to 24, 15.5% from 25 to 44, 34.1% from 45 to 64, and 31.7% who were 65 years of age or older. The median age was 54.9 years. For every 100 females, the population had 88.3 males. For every 100 females ages 18 and older there were 87.1 males.

The Census Bureau's 2006–2010 American Community Survey showed that (in 2010 inflation-adjusted dollars) median household income was $66,667 (with a margin of error of +/− $7,735) and the median family income was $90,625 (+/− $6,808). Males had a median income of $81,759 (+/− $13,790) versus $61,179 (+/− $11,593) for females. The per capita income for the borough was $50,328 (+/− $7,450). About 8.4% of families and 9.1% of the population were below the poverty line, including 7.2% of those under age 18 and 8.3% of those age 65 or over.

=== 2000 census ===
As of the 2000 United States census there were 8,193 people, 3,984 households, and 2,302 families residing in the city. The population density was 2, 243.5/km^{2} (5,825.4/sq mi). There were 7,006 housing units at an average density of 4,981.4 per square mile (1,923.3/km^{2}). The racial makeup of the city was 95.73% White, 0.87% African American, 0.02% Native American, 1.56% Asian, 0.07% Pacific Islander, 0.92% from other races, and 0.83% from two or more races. Hispanic or Latino of any race were 2.71% of the population.

There were 3,984 households, out of which 16.7% had children under the age of 18 living with them, 46.9% were married couples living together, 8.1% had a female householder with no husband present, and 42.2% were non-families. 36.1% of all households were made up of individuals, and 17.5% had someone living alone who was 65 years of age or older. The average household size was 2.06 and the average family size was 2.67.

In the city the population was spread out, with 15.4% under the age of 18, 4.5% from 18 to 24, 23.4% from 25 to 44, 27.9% from 45 to 64, and 28.9% who were 65 years of age or older. The median age was 50 years. For every 100 females, there were 89.1 males. For every 100 females age 18 and over, there were 86.6 males.

The median income for a household in the city was $45,876, and the median income for a family was $63,917. Males had a median income of $48,152 versus $31,025 for females. The per capita income for the city was $33,566. About 7.0% of families and 7.3% of the population were below the poverty line, including 7.6% of those under age 18 and 5.4% of those age 65 or over.

== Parks and recreation ==
=== Summer residency ===
Along with other spots on the Jersey Shore, Margate becomes a popular destination in the summer months. Many houses in Margate are second homes used during the summer, and a considerable number are owned by year-round residents. Unlike in other places, such as Cape May or Ocean City, where many visitors spend a few nights in a hotel, Margate has no hotels, so most of the people who choose this town are regulars. Unlike other area towns such as Ocean City and the municipalities on Long Beach Island, weekly house/condominium rentals are almost non-existent in Margate.

=== Beaches ===
Margate's beaches attract surfers, kayaking, and hobie cat sailing.

The Margate beaches are narrower than beaches at many other places at the Jersey Shore. There are few dunes and those that do exist are artificial, having been created to protect beaches from nor'easters and hurricanes. In the wake of Hurricane Sandy, Margate voters will consider a referendum that would allow the city to participate in a program operated by the United States Army Corps of Engineers under which dunes would be constructed on the city's beaches, which would be intended to alleviate beach erosion and provide storm protection to Margate and to adjoining Ventnor City, which has already had a beach protection program in place for the past ten years, under which dunes have already been constructed.

Margate City Beach Patrol operates lifeguard stands and beach patrol operations for the Margate beaches. Lifeguards are on duty during summer months from 10 am to 6 pm, with more limited hours in the late Spring and early Autumn months.

Margate beaches are not free beaches. Beachgoers must purchase a seasonal or weekly beach tag to enjoy the beach. Seasonal badges can be purchased preseason at a reduced rate. Veterans and active military members are offered free seasonal badges.

=== Marinas and fishing ===
Margate is host to many bayside docks providing the casual fisherman hours of enjoyment and relaxation. Local charter boats offer sport and deep sea fishing. Margate's many marinas offer docks for lease, equipment rentals, fuel stations and fishing charters.

=== Attractions ===
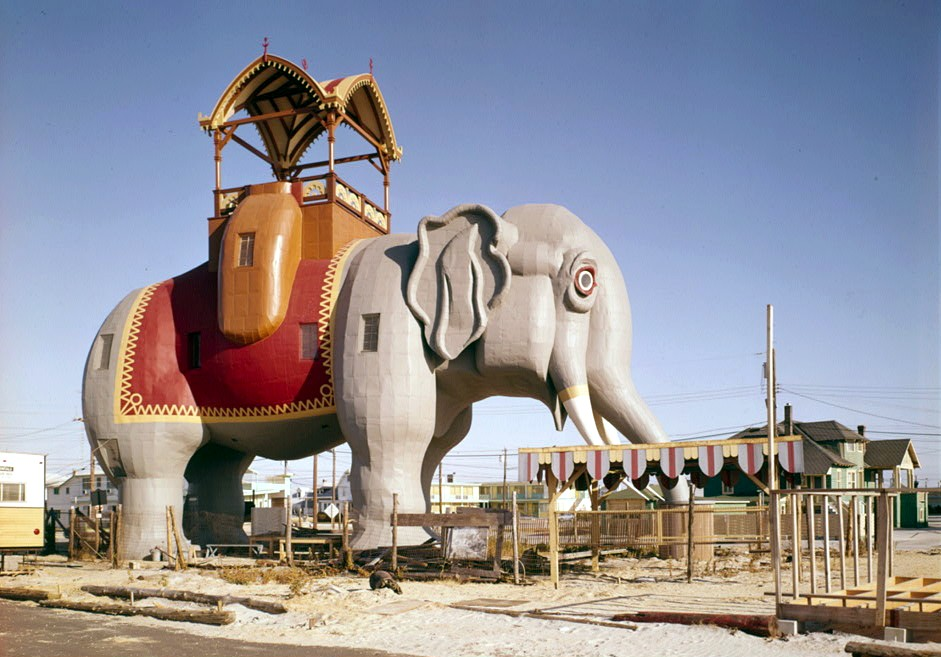
Lucy the Elephant

Margate is the home of Lucy the Elephant, the "largest elephant in the world" and is the oldest remaining example of zoomorphic architecture left in the United States. Over 140 years old, a restoration of Lucy's exterior surface was completed in December 2022 at a cost of about $2.4 million using government funds and donor contributions. The National Historic Landmark is visited by 130,000 people each year.

The Margate farmers' market is held every Thursday during summer months. Shoppers can purchase local produce and a variety of fresh fruits and vegetables.

== Government ==
=== Local government ===
Margate City has operated under the Walsh Act commission form of municipal government since 1911. The city is one of 30 municipalities (of the 564) statewide that use commission form of government. The governing body is comprised of three commissioners, who are elected at-large to four-year terms of office on a non-partisan basis as part of the May municipal election. Each commissioner is assigned a department to oversee and administer. The Mayor is then selected from among the three elected Commissioners by a vote between them and assigned to the office by resolution.

As of 2023, members of the Margate City Commission are Mayor Michael Collins (Commissioner of Public Works, Parks and Public Property), Maurice "Maury" Blumberg (Commissioner of Revenue and Finance) and Catherine Horn (Commissioner of Public Affairs and Public Safety), all of whom are serving concurrent terms of office that end May 16, 2027.

=== Federal, state and county representation ===
Margate City is located in the 2nd Congressional District and is part of New Jersey's 2nd state legislative district.

For the 119th United States Congress, New Jersey's 2nd congressional district is represented by Jeff Van Drew (R, Dennis Township). New Jersey is represented in the United States Senate by Democrats Cory Booker (Newark, term ends 2027) and Andy Kim (Moorestown, term ends 2031).

For the 2026–2027 session, the 2nd legislative district of the New Jersey Legislature is represented in the New Jersey Senate by Vincent J. Polistina (R, Egg Harbor Township) and in the General Assembly by Don Guardian (R, Atlantic City) and Maureen Rowan (D, Atlantic City).

Atlantic County is governed by a directly elected county executive and a nine-member Board of County Commissioners, responsible for legislation. The executive serves a four-year term and the commissioners are elected to staggered three-year terms, of which four are elected from the county on an at-large basis and five of the commissioners represent equally populated districts. As of 2025, Atlantic County's Executive is Dennis Levinson (R, Northfield), whose term of office ends December 31, 2027. Members of the Board of County Commissioners are:

Ernest D. Coursey (D, District 1-- Atlantic City, Egg Harbor Township (part), Longport, Margate City, and Ventnor City; 2025, Atlantic City), Chair Maureen Kern (R, District 2-- Egg Harbor Township (part), Linwood, Northfield, Somers Point and Pleasantville; 2027, Somers Point), Andrew Parker III (R, District 3-- Egg Harbor Township (part) and Hamilton Township (part); 2026, Egg Harbor Township), Richard R. Dase (R, District 4, including Brigantine, Galloway Township, Egg Harbor Township (part), and Port Republic; 2025, Galloway Township), Vice Chair James A. Bertino (R, District 5-- Buena, Buena Vista Township, Corbin City, Egg Harbor City, Estell Manor, Folsom, Hamilton Township (part), Hammonton, Mullica Township and Weymouth Township; 2027, Hammonton), June Byrnes (R, At-Large; 2026, Linwood), Michael Ruffu (R, At-Large; Margate, 2027) Amy L. Gatto (R, At-large; 2025, Hamilton Township) and John W. Risley (R, At-Large; 2026, Egg Harbor Township)

Atlantic County's constitutional officers are: Clerk Joesph J. Giralo (R, 2026, Hammonton), Sheriff Joe O'Donoghue (R, 2026, Egg Harbor Township) and Surrogate James Curcio (R, 2025, Hammonton).

=== Politics ===
As of March 2011, there were a total of 4,984 registered voters in Margate City, of which 1,164 (23.4% vs. 30.5% countywide) were registered as Democrats, 2,019 (40.5% vs. 25.2%) were registered as Republicans and 1,798 (36.1% vs. 44.3%) were registered as Unaffiliated. There were 3 voters registered as Libertarians or Greens. Among the city's 2010 Census population, 78.4% (vs. 58.8% in Atlantic County) were registered to vote, including 91.2% of those ages 18 and over (vs. 76.6% countywide).

Gubernatorial election results for Margate City
Year	Republican		Democratic		Third party(ies)	
Year	No.	%	No.	%	No.	%
2025	1,506	52.84%	1,335	46.84%	9	0.32%
2021	1,416	55.31%	1,137	44.41%	7	0.27%
2017	910	47.89%	963	50.68%	27	1.42%
2013	1,850	71.21%	712	27.41%	36	1.39%
2009	1,466	53.31%	1,145	41.64%	139	5.05%
2005	1,257	44.73%	1,508	53.67%	45	1.60%

In the 2012 presidential election, Republican Mitt Romney received 1,882 votes (54.1% vs. 41.1% countywide), ahead of Democrat Barack Obama with 1,534 votes (44.1% vs. 57.9%) and other candidates with 21 votes (0.6% vs. 0.9%), among the 3,479 ballots cast by the city's 5,109 registered voters, for a turnout of 68.1% (vs. 65.8% in Atlantic County). In the 2008 presidential election, Republican John McCain received 2,061 votes (52.5% vs. 41.6% countywide), ahead of Democrat Barack Obama with 1,793 votes (45.7% vs. 56.5%) and other candidates with 32 votes (0.8% vs. 1.1%), among the 3,922 ballots cast by the city's 5,515 registered voters, for a turnout of 71.1% (vs. 68.1% in Atlantic County). In the 2004 presidential election, Republican George W. Bush received 2,160 votes (49.5% vs. 46.2% countywide), ahead of Democrat John Kerry with 2,132 votes (48.9% vs. 52.0%) and other candidates with 26 votes (0.6% vs. 0.8%), among the 4,362 ballots cast by the city's 5,697 registered voters, for a turnout of 76.6% (vs. 69.8% in the whole county).

Presidential elections results
Year	Republican	Democratic	Third Parties
2024	51.6% 1,826	47.0% 1,665	1.4% 38
2020	50.7% 1,945	48.6% 1,865	0.7% 27
2016	51.0% 1,480	45.9% 1,332	3.1% 89
2012	54.1% 1,882	44.1% 1,534	0.6% 21
2008	52.5% 2,061	45.7% 1,792	0.8% 32
2004	49.5% 2,160	48.9% 2,132	0.6% 26

In the 2013 gubernatorial election, Republican Chris Christie received 1,850 votes (68.9% vs. 60.0% countywide), ahead of Democrat Barbara Buono with 712 votes (26.5% vs. 34.9%) and other candidates with 36 votes (1.3% vs. 1.3%), among the 2,687 ballots cast by the city's 5,127 registered voters, yielding a 52.4% turnout (vs. 41.5% in the county). In the 2009 gubernatorial election, Republican Chris Christie received 1,466 votes (52.7% vs. 47.7% countywide), ahead of Democrat Jon Corzine with 1,145 votes (41.1% vs. 44.5%), Independent Chris Daggett with 123 votes (4.4% vs. 4.8%) and other candidates with 16 votes (0.6% vs. 1.2%), among the 2,784 ballots cast by the city's 5,173 registered voters, yielding a 53.8% turnout (vs. 44.9% in the county).

United States Senate election results for Margate City1
Year	Republican		Democratic		Third party(ies)	
Year	No.	%	No.	%	No.	%
2024	1,817	52.87%	1,592	46.32%	28	0.81%
2018	1,343	56.45%	988	41.53%	48	2.02%
2012	1,700	52.62%	1,490	46.12%	41	1.27%
2006	1,433	50.25%	1,372	48.11%	47	1.65%

United States Senate election results for Margate City2
Year	Republican		Democratic		Third party(ies)	
Year	No.	%	No.	%	No.	%
2020	1,907	50.60%	1,834	48.66%	28	0.74%
2014	1,188	51.61%	1,071	46.52%	43	1.87%
2013	784	52.06%	698	46.35%	24	1.59%
2008	1,897	51.84%	1,727	47.20%	35	0.96%

== Education ==
For kindergarten through eighth grade, public school students attend the Margate City Schools, together with students from Longport Borough, who attend as part of a sending/receiving relationship. As of the 2023–24 school year, the district, comprised of two schools, had an enrollment of 317 students and 48.6 classroom teachers (on an FTE basis), for a student–teacher ratio of 6.5:1. Schools in the district (with 2023–24 enrollment data from the National Center for Education Statistics) are William H. Ross III Elementary School 184 students in grades K–4 and Eugene A. Tighe Middle School with 133 students in grades 5–8. In 2017, Eugene A. Tighe Middle School was one of nine public schools recognized in 2017 as Blue Ribbon Schools by the United States Department of Education.

For ninth through twelfth grades, public school students from Margate attend Atlantic City High School in Atlantic City, which also serves students from Brigantine and Ventnor City who attend the school as part of sending/receiving relationships. As of the 2023–24 school year, the high school had an enrollment of 1,699 students and 144.8 classroom teachers (on an FTE basis), for a student–teacher ratio of 11.7:1.\

City public school students are also eligible to attend the Atlantic County Institute of Technology in the Mays Landing section of Hamilton Township or the Charter-Tech High School for the Performing Arts, located in Somers Point.

Blessed Sacrament Regional School was a Catholic school serving students in grades pre-kindergarten through eighth grade that had been operated in connection with the Blessed Sacrament Church, but was closed by the Roman Catholic Diocese of Camden in June 2008 and merged with St. James of Ventnor to form Holy Family Regional School. Those who wish to attend a Catholic high school choose from Holy Spirit High School, located in Absecon, St. Augustine College Preparatory School located in Richland or Our Lady of Mercy Academy located in Newfield.

== Transportation ==
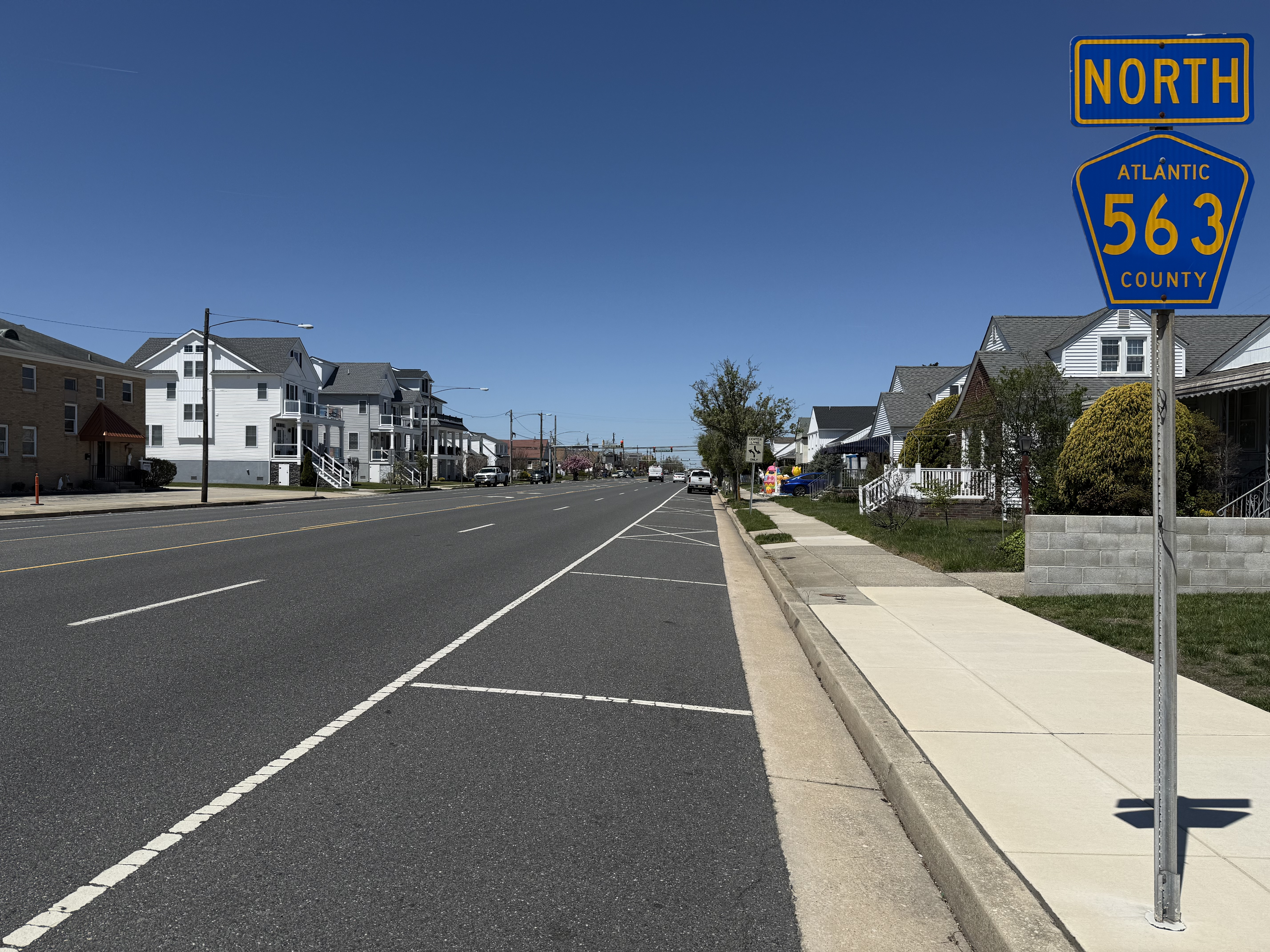
County Route 563 northbound in Margate City

=== Roads and highways ===
As of May 2010, the city had a total of 42.53 miles (68.45 km) of roadways, of which 39.98 miles (64.34 km) were maintained by the municipality and 2.55 miles (4.10 km) by Atlantic County.

No Interstate, U.S. or state highways directly serve Margate City. The most significant roadways are county roads. County Route 563 begins in Margate City and follows Jerome Avenue over the Downbeach Express, a privately owned and operated toll-bridge which connects Margate to the mainland, towards Egg Harbor Township and Northfield. County Route 629 follows Ventnor Avenue northeast toward Ventnor and Atlantic City, and southwest towards Longport and Somers Point.

=== Public transportation ===
NJ Transit provides bus service on the 505 route between Longport and Atlantic City. Beginning April 1, 2023, bus service on the 504 route between Atlantic City and Ventnor Plaza was extended to Margate.

== Climate ==
According to the Köppen climate classification system, Margate City has a humid subtropical climate (Cfa) with hot, moderately humid summers, cool winters and uniform, year-round precipitation. Cfa climates are characterized by all months having an average mean temperature above 32.0 °F (0.0 °C), at least four months with an average mean temperature at or above 50.0 °F (10.0 °C), at least one month with an average mean temperature at or above 71.6 °F (22.0 °C) and no significant precipitation difference between seasons. During the summer months in Margate City, a cooling afternoon sea breeze is present on most days, but episodes of extreme heat and humidity can occur, with heat index values at or above 95.0 °F (35.0 °C). During the winter months, episodes of extreme cold and wind can occur, with wind chill values below 0.0 °F (−17.8 °C). The plant hardiness zone at Margate City Beach is 7b with an average annual extreme minimum air temperature of 7.0 °F (−13.9 °C). The average seasonal (November–April) snowfall total is 12 to 18 inches (300 to 460 mm), and the average snowiest month is February, which corresponds with the annual peak in nor'easter activity.

Climate data for Margate City Beach, NJ (1981–2010 Averages)
Month	Jan	Feb	Mar	Apr	May	Jun	Jul	Aug	Sep	Oct	Nov	Dec	Year
Mean daily maximum °F (°C)	41.5 (5.3)	43.4 (6.3)	50.2 (10.1)	59.2 (15.1)	68.4 (20.2)	77.4 (25.2)	82.3 (27.9)	81.2 (27.3)	75.7 (24.3)	65.3 (18.5)	56.1 (13.4)	46.5 (8.1)	62.4 (16.9)
Daily mean °F (°C)	33.8 (1.0)	35.7 (2.1)	42.2 (5.7)	51.3 (10.7)	60.5 (15.8)	69.9 (21.1)	75.1 (23.9)	74.1 (23.4)	68.0 (20.0)	57.3 (14.1)	48.1 (8.9)	38.7 (3.7)	54.6 (12.6)
Mean daily minimum °F (°C)	26.2 (−3.2)	28.1 (−2.2)	34.1 (1.2)	43.4 (6.3)	52.7 (11.5)	62.4 (16.9)	68.0 (20.0)	67.0 (19.4)	60.3 (15.7)	49.2 (9.6)	40.1 (4.5)	30.9 (−0.6)	47.0 (8.3)
Average precipitation inches (mm)	3.25 (83)	2.89 (73)	4.18 (106)	3.61 (92)	3.23 (82)	2.96 (75)	3.40 (86)	4.15 (105)	3.08 (78)	3.62 (92)	3.36 (85)	3.88 (99)	41.61 (1,057)
Average relative humidity (%)	68.1	67.0	63.5	64.4	69.3	73.1	73.1	75.1	73.2	71.9	69.8	68.1	69.7
Average dew point °F (°C)	24.4 (−4.2)	25.8 (−3.4)	30.7 (−0.7)	39.7 (4.3)	50.4 (10.2)	60.9 (16.1)	65.9 (18.8)	65.7 (18.7)	59.1 (15.1)	48.3 (9.1)	38.7 (3.7)	29.1 (−1.6)	45.0 (7.2)
Source: PRISM

Climate data for Atlantic City, NJ Ocean Water Temperature (5 NE Margate City)
Month	Jan	Feb	Mar	Apr	May	Jun	Jul	Aug	Sep	Oct	Nov	Dec	Year
Daily mean °F (°C)	37 (3)	35 (2)	42 (6)	48 (9)	56 (13)	63 (17)	70 (21)	73 (23)	70 (21)	61 (16)	53 (12)	44 (7)	54 (12)
Source: NOAA

== Ecology ==
According to the A. W. Kuchler U.S. potential natural vegetation types, Margate City would have a dominant vegetation type of Northern Cordgrass (73) with a dominant vegetation form of Coastal Prairie (20).

== Popular culture ==
In the 2009 film (500) Days of Summer, Margate is the hometown of the male lead character, Tom Hansen, played by Joseph Gordon-Levitt. One of the screenplay's co-writers, Scott Neustadter, grew up in Margate.

In the 1998 Nicolas Cage mystery/thriller film Snake Eyes, Margate is the main character's place of residence, alluded to as a pleasant suburban town, in contrast to the grittier Atlantic City, which forms the backdrop of the story.

In the third-season finale of Boardwalk Empire, "Margate Sands", the city is referenced as a site of gang violence between the forces of fictionalized Nucky Thompson and his rivals.

The movie Duane Hopwood was filmed at Eugene A. Tighe Middle School and at Maynards Cafe in 2004.

== Notable people ==
People who were born in, residents of, or otherwise closely associated with Margate City include:

- John F. Amodeo (born 1950), politician who served in the New Jersey General Assembly from 2008 to 2014, where he represented the 2nd Legislative District
- Chris Arena (born 1987), singer-songwriter
- Colin Bell (born 1981), member of the New Jersey Senate who represented the 2nd Legislative District
- David Brog (born 1965/1966), former executive director of Christians United for Israel
- Tim Cavanaugh (born 1967), Los Angeles Times editor who is a Margate native and was an MCBP lifeguard
- Micaela Diamond (born 1999), Broadway actor best known for originating the role of Babe (Cher) in The Cher Show
- Nancy Falkow (born 1970), singer / songwriter
- Vince Fumo (born 1943), former member of the Pennsylvania State Senate who was convicted in 2009 on federal corruption charges
- Milton W. Glenn (1903–1967), politician who represented New Jersey's 2nd congressional district in the United States House of Representatives from 1957 to 1965
- Zulfi Hoxha (born 1992), jihadi, ISIS fighter
- Walter S. Jeffries (1893–1954), politician who represented New Jersey's 2nd congressional district from 1939 to 1941, and was mayor of Margate City from 1931 to 1935
- Red Klotz (1920–2014), former NBA point guard who created the Washington Generals as the team that plays against and tours with the Harlem Globetrotters
- Mary Lacity (born 1963), Walton Professor of Information Systems and Director of the Blockchain Center of Excellence at the University of Arkansas
- Pete Latzo (1902–1968), boxer who was welterweight champion in the 1920s
- Thomas C. McGrath Jr. (1927–1994), represented New Jersey's 2nd congressional district in the United States House of Representatives from 1965 to 1967
- Scott Neustadter (born 1977), Hollywood screenwriter who co-wrote (500) Days of Summer
- Steven P. Perskie (born 1945), former New Jersey Superior Court judge who served in the New Jersey General Assembly and the New Jersey Senate
- Ralph L. Sacco (1957–2023), neurologist, who served as president of the American Heart Association
- Jessica Savitch (1947–1983), television broadcaster and reporter
- Claire Swift (born 1974), politician who represented the 2nd Legislative District in the New Jersey General Assembly from 2022-2026

Preceded by Ventnor City	Beaches of New Jersey	Succeeded by Longport
