= Isaac Bacharach =

American politician

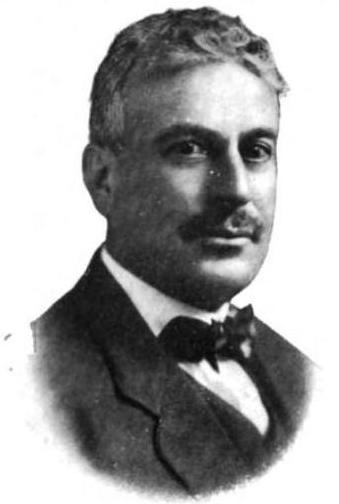
- From Volume 1 of 1918's Scannell's New Jersey's First Citizens

Member of the U.S. House of Representatives from New Jersey's 2nd district
- In office March 4, 1915 – January 3, 1937
- Preceded by: J. Thompson Baker
- Succeeded by: Elmer H. Wene

Member of the New Jersey General Assembly from Atlantic County
- In office 1911
- Preceded by: Walter E. Edge
- Succeeded by: Carlton Godfrey

Member of the Atlantic City Council
- In office 1905–1910

Personal details
- Born: January 5, 1870 Philadelphia, Pennsylvania, U.S.
- Died: September 5, 1956 (aged 86) Atlantic City, New Jersey, U.S.
- Resting place: Mount Sinai Cemetery in Philadelphia
- Party: Republican
- Relations: Harry Bacharach (brother)
- Profession: Politician
- Nickname: Boardwalk Ike

Isaac Bacharach (January 5, 1870 – September 5, 1956) was an American financier, real estate broker, and Republican Party politician from Atlantic City, New Jersey who represented New Jersey's 2nd congressional district for 11 terms from 1915 to 1937. He also served two terms on the Atlantic City Council (1905–10) and one term in the New Jersey General Assembly (1911).

== Early life and education ==
Isaac Bacharach was born on January 5, 1870 in Philadelphia to Jacob and Betty (Nusbaum) Bacharach. In 1881, the family moved to New Jersey and settled in Atlantic City, where he attended the public schools and graduated from Atlantic City High School in 1885. His family became influential in the city and region, and he became an Atlantic City merchant after leaving school before entering the real estate business. He also became interested in the lumber business and in banking. He was president of the Atlantic City Lumber Company, first vice president of the Second National Bank of Atlantic City, and a director of the Atlantic Safe Deposit and Trust Company and the Absecon National Bank.

His real estate firm, founded in 1895, was one of the first developers in the city of Brigantine and was responsible for building the Brigantine Hotel. He remained active in its management until his death.

His brother, Harry Bacharach, was also involved in Atlantic City politics and served several terms as mayor. He was arrested for electoral fraud in connection with his 1910 campaign.

== Political career ==
Bacharach was elected to two terms on the Atlantic City council and served from 1906 to 1911. During his term on the council, he chaired a number of important committees, including the Committee on Finance, and acted as floor leader for the Republican Party.

In 1910, he was elected to the New Jersey General Assembly. He served one term in 1911 and declined a nomination for a second term.

=== Congress ===
Bacharach returned to politics in 1913 when he was recruited to run for the United States House of Representatives in New Jersey's 2nd congressional district, representing Atlantic, Burlington, Cape May, and Cumberland counties. Bacharach was elected in 1914 and re-elected to ten consecutive terms until 1936, when he was defeated by Elmer H. Wene.

He was also a delegate to the 1920 Republican National Convention in Chicago.

After leaving Congress, he engaged in the real-estate and insurance business in Atlantic City.

== Personal life ==
Bacharach married Florence Scull. She died in 1904; they had no children.

In 1924, Isaac Bacharach and his brother Harry founded the Betty Bacharach Home for Afflicted Children in Longport. The home cared for children afflicted with infantile paralysis. The building was turned over to the Atlantic City Lodge of the Elks before becoming the Longport borough hall in 1990.

== Death and burial ==
Bacharach died at Atlantic City Hospital on September 5, 1956, after suffering a stroke at his home in Brigantine. He was interred in Mount Sinai Cemetery in Philadelphia.

== Electoral history ==
=== United States House of Representatives ===
United States House of Representatives elections, 1936
Party	Candidate	Votes	%	±%
Democratic	Elmer H. Wene	55,580	49.99	
Republican	Isaac Bacharach (incumbent)	50958	45.83	▼4.60
Union	Ted Lenore	3,241	2.91	
Property Home Protection	U. G. Robinson	1,206	1.08	
Socialist	Franklin L. Watkins	97	0.09	▼0.14
National Union for Social Justice	Frank A. Yacovelli	86	0.08	
End Poverty	Thomas F. Ogilvie	17	0.02	
Total votes		111,185	100.0	
Democratic gain from Republican				

United States House of Representatives elections, 1934
Party	Candidate	Votes	%	±%
Republican	Isaac Bacharach (incumbent)	49.824	50.43	▼12.47
Democratic	Charles W. Ackley	48,743	49.34	
Socialist	Franklin L. Watkins	226	0.23	
Total votes		98,793	100	
Republican hold				

United States House of Representatives elections, 1932
Party	Candidate	Votes	%	±%
Republican	Isaac Bacharach (incumbent)	60,963	62.90	▼16.77
Democratic	Harry R. Coulomb	35,257	36.38	
Socialist	Albert H. Schreiber	413	0.43	
Prohibition	Walter L. Yerkes	292	0.30	
Total votes		96,925	100	
Republican hold				

United States House of Representatives elections, 1930
Party	Candidate	Votes	%	±%
Republican	Isaac Bacharach (incumbent)	67,729	79.67	▲3.41
Democratic	Hans Froelicher Jr.	17,125	20.14	
Communist	Florian Ambrosch	155	0.18	
Total votes		85,009	99.99	
Republican hold				

United States House of Representatives elections, 1928
Party	Candidate	Votes	%
Republican	Isaac Bacharach (incumbent)	99,109	76.26
Democratic	George R. Greis	30,856	23.74
Total votes		129,965	100.0

== See also ==
- List of Jewish members of the United States Congress

U.S. House of Representatives
Preceded by J. Thompson Baker	Member of the U.S. House of Representatives from New Jersey's 2nd congressional district March 4, 1915 – January 3, 1937	Succeeded by Elmer H. Wene
