= 1944 United States Senate special election in New Jersey =

- November 7, 1944
- Turnout: 83% (▼3pp)
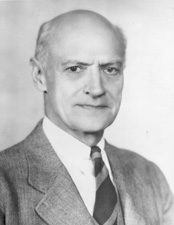

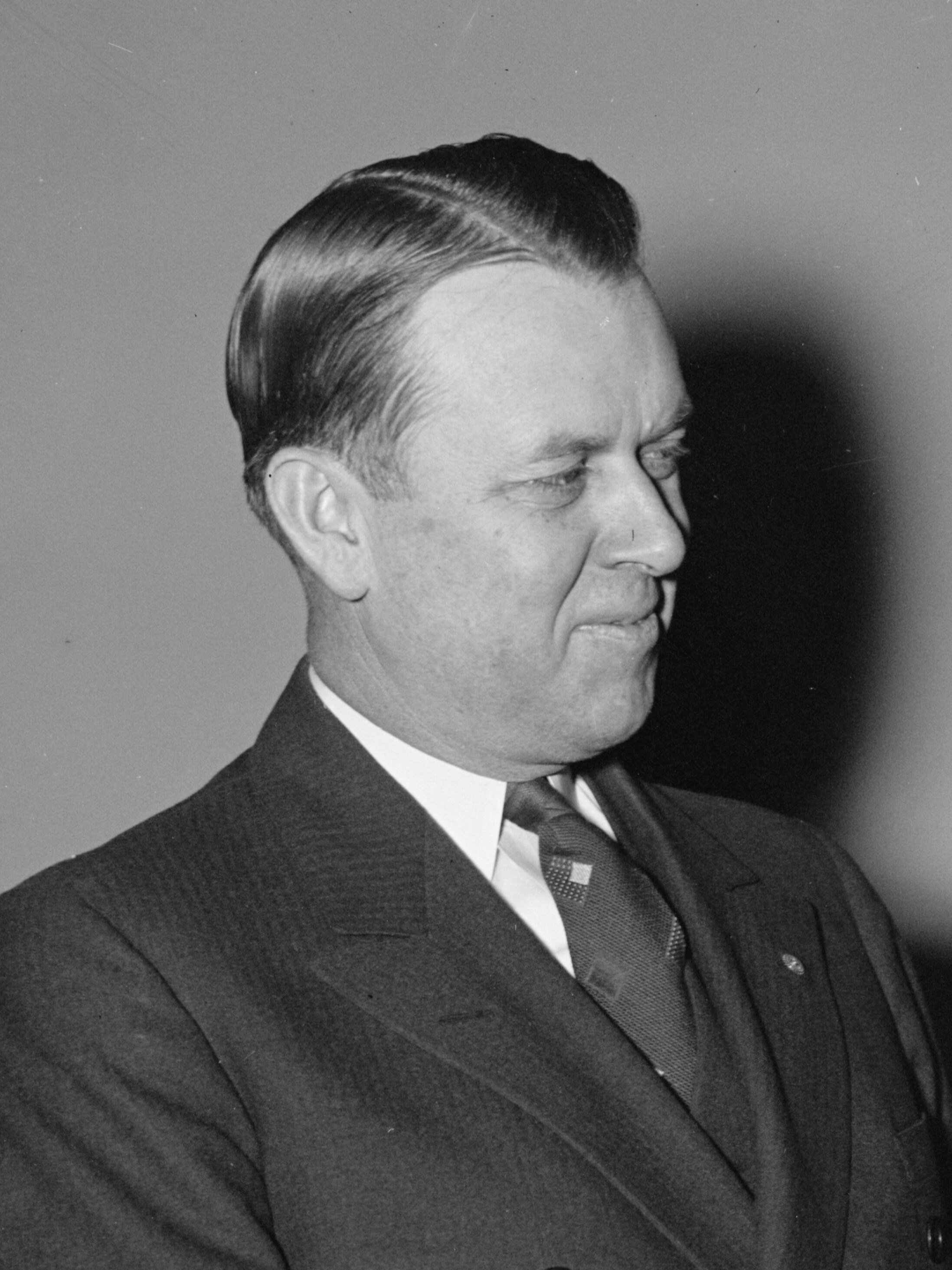
Nominee	H. Alexander Smith	Elmer H. Wene
Party	Republican	Democratic
Popular vote	939,987	910,096
Percentage	50.44%	48.84%
- County results Smith: 50–60% 60–70% Wene: 50–60% 60–70%
Senator before election
Arthur Walsh
Democratic
Elected Senator
H. Alexander Smith
Republican

The 1944 United States Senate special election in New Jersey was held on November 7, 1944.

The election was held to fill the unexpired term of W. Warren Barbour, who died in November 1943. H. Alexander Smith was elected to the open seat over Democratic U.S. Representative Elmer H. Wene.

The incumbent Democratic appointee, Arthur Walsh, did not run.

== Background ==
Incumbent Senator W. Warren Barbour was elected in 1940 to a six-year term set to expire in 1947. He died on November 22, 1943, of a cerebral hemorrhage.

On November 26, Governor of New Jersey Charles Edison appointed Arthur Walsh to fill the vacant seat until a successor could be duly elected.

A special election to complete the remainder of Barbour's unexpired term was scheduled for November 7, 1944, concurrent with the general election for presidential electors and U.S. House of Representatives.

== Democratic primary ==
=== Candidates ===
- Elmer H. Wene, U.S. Representative from Vineland

==== Declined ====
- Arthur Walsh, interim Senator

=== Results ===
1944 Democratic U.S. Senate special primary
Party	Candidate	Votes	%
Democratic	Elmer H. Wene	151,126	100.0%
Total votes		151,126	100.0%

== Republican primary ==
=== Candidates ===
- H. Alexander Smith, Princeton attorney and member of the Republican National Committee
- Andrew O. Wittreich, Tenafly resident

==== Withdrew ====
- Guy Gabrielson, former Speaker of the General Assembly and assemblyman from East Orange

=== Campaign ===
Gabrielson withdrew from the race after party leadership coalesced behind Smith. As consolation, Gabrielson was elected to succeed Smith as Republican National Committeeman. In 1949, he was elected chair of the Republican National Committee.

=== Results ===
1944 Republican Senate special primary
Party	Candidate	Votes	%
Republican	H. Alexander Smith	187,190	82.55%
Republican	Andrew O. Wittreich	39,576	17.45%
Total votes		226,766	100.00%

== General election ==
=== Candidates ===
- John C. Butterworth (Socialist Labor)
- George W. Ridout (Prohibition), Methodist minister
- Morris Riger (Socialist)
- H. Alexander Smith (Republican), Princeton attorney and member of the Republican National Committee
- Elmer H. Wene (Democratic), U.S. Representative from Vineland

=== Endorsements ===
H. A. Smith (R)

Individuals

- Russell Davenport, foreign affairs advisor to Wendell Willkie

Elmer Wene (D)

Individuals

- Henry W. Jeffers, dairy farmer and former chair of the New Jersey Republican State Committee (Republican)

=== Campaign ===
Smith reported $15,116 (approximately $219,310 in 2025 dollars) in campaign spending, a considerable sum for the time.

=== Results ===
Wene conceded defeat on November 9, after overseas military ballots were counted. Wene received a substantial majority of the military ballots, but it was not sufficient to overcome Smith's margin in the statewide vote.

1944 U.S. Senate special election in New Jersey
Party	Candidate	Votes	%
Republican	Howard Alexander Smith	940,051	50.44%
Democratic	Elmer H. Wene	910,096	48.84%
Prohibition	George W. Ridout	9,873	0.53%
Socialist Labor	John C. Butterworth	1,997	0.11%
Socialist	Morris Riger	1,593	0.09%
Majority		29,955	1.60%
Turnout		1,863,610	
Republican gain from Democratic			

== See also ==
- 1944 United States Senate elections
