= List of United States representatives from New Jersey =

The following is an alphabetical list of United States representatives from the state of New Jersey. For chronological tables of members of both houses of the United States Congress from the state (through the present day), see New Jersey's congressional delegations. The list of names should be complete, but other data may be incomplete.

== Current representatives ==
As of April 16, 2026:

- 1st district: Donald Norcross (D) (since 2014)
- 2nd district: Jeff Van Drew (R) (since 2019)
- 3rd district: Herb Conaway (D) (since 2025)
- 4th district: Chris Smith (R) (since 1981)
- 5th district: Josh Gottheimer (D) (since 2017)
- 6th district: Frank Pallone (D) (since 1988)
- 7th district: Thomas Kean Jr. (R) (since 2023)
- 8th district: Rob Menendez (D) (since 2023)
- 9th district: Nellie Pou (D) (since 2025)
- 10th district: LaMonica McIver (D) (since 2024)
- 11th district: Analilia Mejia (D) (since 2026)
- 12th district: Bonnie Watson Coleman (D) (since 2015)

== List of members ==
Member	Party	District	Years	Electoral history
Ernest R. Ackerman	Republican	5th	1919 – 1931	Elected in 1918. Died.
Hugh J. Addonizio	Democratic	11th	1949 – 1962	Elected in 1948. Resigned to become Mayor of Newark
John Adler	Democratic	3rd	2009 – 2011	Elected in 2008. Lost re-election to Runyan
Garnett B. Adrain	Democratic	3rd	1857 – 1861	Elected in 1856. Retired.
Henry C. Allen	Republican	6th	1905 – 1907	Elected in 1904. Retired.
Rob Andrews	Democratic	1st	1990 – 2014	Elected to finish Florio's term. Resigned due to House Ethics investigation.
Stewart H. Appleby	Republican	3rd	1925 – 1927	Elected to finish his father's term. Retired.
Theodore F. Appleby	Republican	3rd	1921 – 1923	Elected in 1920. Lost re-election to Geran.
James C. Auchincloss	Republican	3rd	1943 – 1965	Elected in 1942. Retired.
Oscar L. Auf Der Heide	Democratic	11th	1925 – 1933	Elected in 1924. Redistricted to the 14th district.
Oscar L. Auf Der Heide	Democratic	14th	1933 – 1935	Redistricted from the 11th district and re-elected in 1932. Retired.
John Bancker Aycrigg	Whig	At-large	1837 – 1839	Elected in 1836. Re-elected, but the House declined to seat him. (Note: See Broad Seal War)
John Bancker Aycrigg	Whig	At-large	1841 – 1843	Elected in 1840. Retired.
Isaac Bacharach	Republican	2nd	1915 – 1937	Elected in 1914. Lost re-election to Wene.
Ezra Baker	Democratic-Republican	At-large	1815 – 1817	Elected in 1814. Retired.
Jacob T. Baker	Democratic	2nd	1913 – 1915	Elected in 1912. Lost re-election to Bacharach.
Ephraim Bateman	Democratic-Republican	At-large	1815 – 1823	Elected in 1814. Retired.
John Beatty	Pro-Administration	At-large	1793 – 1795	Elected in 1792. Lost re-election to Thomson.
Charles D. Beckwith	Republican	5th	1889 – 1891	Elected in 1888. Lost re-election to Cadmus.
Benjamin Bennet	Democratic-Republican	At-large	1815 – 1819	Elected in 1814. Lost re-election to B. Smith.
Allan Benny	Democratic	9th	1903 – 1905	Elected in 1902. Lost re-election to Van Winkle.
Christopher A. Bergen	Republican	1st	1889 – 1893	Elected in 1888. Lost renomination to Loudenslager.
Thomas Bines	Democratic-Republican	3rd	1814 – 1815	Elected to finish Hufty's term. Retired.
William F. Birch	Republican	5th	1918 – 1919	Elected to finish Capstick's term. Retired.
John T. Bird	Democratic	3rd	1869 – 1873	Elected in 1868. Retired.
James Bishop	Opposition	3rd	1855 – 1857	Elected in 1854. Lost re-election to Adrain.
John L. Blake	Republican	6th	1879 – 1881	Elected in 1878. Retired.
Joseph Bloomfield	Democratic-Republican	At-large	1817 – 1821	Elected in 1816. Retired.
Elias Boudinot	Pro-Administration	At-large	1789 – 1795	Elected in 1789. Retired.
Adam Boyd	Democratic-Republican	At-large	1803 – 1805	Elected in 1803. Retired.
Adam Boyd	Democratic-Republican	At-large	1808 – 1813	Elected to finish Darby's term. Retired.
Robert G. Bremner	Democratic	7th	1913 – 1914	Elected in 1912. Died.
John H. Brewer	Republican	2nd	1881 – 1885	Elected in 1880. Retired.
Lewis A. Brigham	Republican	7th	1879 – 1881	Elected in 1878. Lost re-election to Hardenbergh.
George H. Brown	Whig	4th	1851 – 1853	Elected in 1850. Retired.
Charles Browne	Democratic	4th	1923 – 1925	Elected in 1922. Lost re-election to Eaton.
William J. Browning	Republican	1st	1911 – 1920	Elected to finish Loudenslager's term. Died.
James Buchanan	Republican	2nd	1885 – 1893	Elected in 1884. Retired.
Cornelius A. Cadmus	Democratic	5th	1891 – 1895	Elected in 1890. Retired.
Lambert Cadwalader	Pro-Administration	At-large	1789 – 1791	Elected in 1789. Lost re-election to Kitchell.
Lambert Cadwalader	Pro-Administration	At-large	1793 – 1795	Elected in 1792. Lost re-election to I. Smith.
William T. Cahill	Republican	1st	1959 – 1967	Elected in 1958. Redistricted to the 6th district.
William T. Cahill	Republican	6th	1967 – 1970	Redistricted from the 1st district and re-elected in 1966. Resigned when elected governor.
Gordon Canfield	Republican	8th	1941 – 1961	Elected in 1940. Retired.
John Henry Capstick	Republican	5th	1915 – 1918	Elected in 1914. Died.
Clifford P. Case	Republican	6th	1945 – 1953	Elected in 1944. Resigned to become president of the Fund for the Republic.
George Cassedy	Democratic-Republican	At-large	1821 – 1825	Elected in 1820. Switched parties.
George Cassedy	Jacksonian	At-large	1825 – 1827	Re-elected in 1824 as a Jacksonian. Lost re-election to Pierson.
Peter A. Cavicchia	Republican	9th	1931 – 1933	Elected in 1930. Redistricted to the 11th district.
Peter A. Cavicchia	Republican	11th	1933 – 1937	Redistricted from the 9th district and re-elected in 1932. Lost re-election to O'Neill.
William Chetwood	Whig	At-large	1836 – 1837	Elected to finish Dickerson's term. Retired.
Abraham Clark	Pro-Administration	At-large	1791 – 1794	Elected in 1791. Died.
Alvah A. Clark	Democratic	4th	1877 – 1881	Elected in 1876. Retired.
Amos Clark Jr.	Republican	3rd	1873 – 1875	Elected in 1872. Lost re-election to Ross.
Isaiah D. Clawson	Opposition	1st	1855 – 1857	Elected in 1854. Switched parties.
Isaiah D. Clawson	Republican	1st	1857 – 1859	Re-elected in 1856 as a Republican. Retired.
Orestes Cleveland	Democratic	5th	1869 – 1871	Elected in 1868. Lost re-election to Halsey.
George T. Cobb	Democratic	4th	1861 – 1863	Elected in 1860. Retired.
Bonnie Watson Coleman	Democratic	12th	2015 – present	Elected in 2014. Incumbent.
Herb Conaway	Democratic	3rd	2025 – present	Elected in 2024. Incumbent.
Lewis Condict	Democratic-Republican	At-large	1811 – 1813	Elected in 1810. Redistricted to the 1st district.
Lewis Condict	Democratic-Republican	1st	1813 – 1815	Redistricted from the at-large district and re-elected in 1813. Redistricted to the at-large district.
Lewis Condict	Democratic-Republican	At-large	1815 – 1817	Redistricted from the 1st district and re-elected in 1814. Retired.
Lewis Condict	Democratic-Republican	At-large	1821 – 1825	Elected to finish Linn's term. Switched parties.
Lewis Condict	Anti-Jacksonian	At-large	1825 – 1833	Re-elected in 1824 as an Anti-Jacksonian. Retired.
John Condit	Democratic-Republican	1st	1799 – 1801	Elected in 1798. Redistricted to the at-large district.
John Condit	Democratic-Republican	At-large	1801 – 1803	Redistricted from the 1st district and re-elected in 1800. Retired to run for U.S. senator.
John Condit	Democratic-Republican	At-large	1819 – 1819	Elected in 1818. Resigned to become assistant collector of the Port of New York.
Silas Condit	Anti-Jacksonian	At-large	1831 – 1833	Elected in 1830. Retired.
Richard M. Cooper	Anti-Jacksonian	At-large	1829 – 1833	Elected in 1828. Retired.
William R. Cooper	Democratic	At-large	1839 – 1841	Elected in 1838. Retired.
Johnston Cornish	Democratic	4th	1893 – 1895	Elected in 1892. Lost re-election to Pitney.
James A. Courter	Republican	13th	1979 – 1983	Elected in 1978. Redistricted to the 12th district.
James A. Courter	Republican	12th	1983 – 1991	Redistricted from the 13th district and re-elected in 1982. Retired.
James Cox	Democratic-Republican	At-large	1809 – 1810	Elected in 1808. Died.
William Coxe Jr.	Federalist	At-large	1813 – 1815	Elected in 1813. Retired.
Augustus W. Cutler	Democratic	5th	1875 – 1879	Elected in 1874. Retired.
William D. Daly	Democratic	7th	1899 – 1900	Elected in 1898. Died.
Dominick V. Daniels	Democratic	14th	1959 – 1977	Elected in 1958. Retired.
Ezra Darby	Democratic-Republican	At-large	1805 – 1808	Elected in 1804. Died.
Franklin Davenport	Federalist	5th	1799 – 1801	Elected in 1798. Redistricted to the at-large district and lost re-election.
Jonathan Dayton	Federalist	At-large	1791 – 1799	Elected in 1791. Redistricted to the 3rd district and retired to run for U.S. Senator.
Vincent J. Dellay	Republican	14th	1957 – 1958	Elected in 1956. Switched parties.
Vincent J. Dellay	Democratic	14th	1958 – 1959	Switched parties and lost Democratic nomination to Daniels.
Philemon Dickerson	Jacksonian	At-large	1833 – 1836	Elected in 1832. Resigned to become governor.
Philemon Dickerson	Democratic	At-large	1839 – 1841	Elected in 1838. Lost re-election to Aycrigg.
Samuel A. Dobbins	Republican	2nd	1873 – 1877	Elected in 1872. Retired.
Jeff Van Drew	Democratic	2nd	2019 – 2020	Elected in 2018. Switched parties.
Jeff Van Drew	Republican	2nd	2020 – present	Swithced parties and Re-elected in 2020 as a Republican.
Dow H. Drukker	Republican	7th	1914 – 1919	Elected to finish Bremner's term. Retired.
John T. Dunn	Democratic	8th	1893 – 1895	Elected in 1892. Lost re-election to C. Fowler.
Bernard J. Dwyer	Democratic	15th	1981 – 1983	Elected in 1980. Redistricted to the 6th district.
Bernard J. Dwyer	Democratic	6th	1983 – 1993	Redistricted from the 15th district and re-elected in 1982. Retired.
Florence P. Dwyer	Republican	6th	1957 – 1967	Elected in 1956. Redistricted to the 12th district.
Florence P. Dwyer	Republican	12th	1967 – 1973	Redistricted from the 6th district and re-elected in 1966. Retired.
John J. Eagan	Democratic	11th	1913 – 1921	Elected in 1912. Lost re-election to Olpp.
John J. Eagan	Democratic	11th	1923 – 1925	Elected in 1922. Lost renomination to der Heide.
Charles A. Eaton	Republican	4th	1925 – 1933	Elected in 1924. Redistricted to the 5th district.
Charles A. Eaton	Republican	5th	1933 – 1953	Redistricted from the 4th district and re-elected in 1932. Retired.
Joseph E. Edsall	Democratic	4th	1845 – 1847	Elected in 1844. Redistricted to the 3rd district.
Joseph E. Edsall	Democratic	3rd	1847 – 1849	Redistricted from the 4th district and re-elected in 1846. Retired.
Ebenezer Elmer	Democratic-Republican	At-large	1801 – 1807	Elected in 1800. Lost re-election to Newbold.
Lucius Q.C. Elmer	Democratic	1st	1843 – 1845	Elected in 1842. Lost re-election to Hampton.
Thomas D. English	Democratic	6th	1891 – 1895	Elected in 1890. Lost re-election to R. Parker
Isaac G. Farlee	Democratic	3rd	1843 – 1845	Elected in 1842. Lost re-election to Runk.
Millicent H. Fenwick	Republican	5th	1975 – 1983	Elected in 1974. Redistricted to the 12th district and retired to run for U.S. Senator.
Michael A. Ferguson	Republican	7th	2001 – 2009	Elected in 2000. Retired.
Thomas M. Ferrell	Democratic	1st	1883 – 1885	Elected in 1882. Lost re-election to Hires.
William H.F. Fiedler	Democratic	6th	1883 – 1885	Elected in 1882. Lost re-election to H. Lehlbach.
George B. Fielder	Democratic	7th	1893 – 1895	Elected in 1892. Retired.
De Witt C. Flanagan	Democratic	4th	1902 – 1903	Elected to finish Salmon's term. Retired.
James J. Florio	Democratic	1st	1975 – 1990	Elected in 1974. Resigned when elected governor.
Samuel C. Forker	Democratic	2nd	1871 – 1873	Elected in 1870. Lost re-election to Dobbins.
Edwin B. Forsythe	Republican	6th	1970 – 1983	Elected to finish Cahill's term. Redistricted to the 13th district.
Edwin B. Forsythe	Republican	13th	1983 – 1984	Redistricted from the 6th district and re-elected in 1982. Died.
Franklin W. Fort	Republican	9th	1925 – 1931	Elected in 1924. Retired to run for U.S. senator.
Charles N. Fowler	Republican	8th	1895 – 1903	Elected in 1894. Redistricted to the 5th district.
Charles N. Fowler	Republican	5th	1903 – 1911	Redistricted from the 8th district and re-elected in 1902. Retired to run for U.S. senator.
Samuel Fowler	Jacksonian	At-large	1833 – 1837	Elected in 1832. Retired.
Samuel Fowler	Democratic	4th	1889 – 1893	Elected in 1888. Retired.
Robert D. Franks	Republican	7th	1993 – 2001	Elected in 1992. Retired to run for U.S. senator.
Peter Frelinghuysen Jr.	Republican	5th	1953 – 1975	Elected in 1952. Retired.
Rodney Frelinghuysen	Republican	11th	1995 – 2019	Elected in 1994. Retired.
Cornelius E. Gallagher	Democratic	13th	1959 – 1973	Elected in 1958. Lost renomination to Meyner.
Dean A. Gallo	Republican	11th	1985 – 1994	Elected in 1984. Died.
John J. Gardner	Republican	2nd	1893 – 1913	Elected in 1892. Lost re-election to J. Baker.
Scott Garrett	Republican	5th	2003 – 2017	Elected in 2002. Lost re-election to Gottheimer.
Daniel Garrison	Democratic-Republican	At-large	1823 – 1825	Elected in 1822. Switched parties.
Daniel Garrison	Jacksonian	At-large	1825 – 1827	Re-elected in 1824 as a Jacksonian. Lost re-election to H. Thompson.
Jacob A. Geissenhainer	Democratic	3rd	1889 – 1895	Elected in 1888. Lost re-election to B. Howell.
Elmer H. Geran	Democratic	3rd	1923 – 1925	Elected in 1922. Lost re-election to T. Appleby.
Milton W. Glenn	Republican	2nd	1957 – 1965	Elected to finish Hand's term. Lost re-election to McGrath.
Josh Gottheimer	Democratic	5th	2017 – present	Elected in 2016. Incumbent.
Edward W. Gray	Republican	6th	1915 – 1919	Elected in 1914. Lost re-election to McGlennon.
Robert S. Green	Democratic	3rd	1885 – 1887	Elected in 1884. Retired to run for governor and resigned when elected.
Dudley S. Gregory	Whig	5th	1847 – 1849	Elected in 1846. Retired.
Frank J. Guarini Jr.	Democratic	14th	1979 – 1993	Elected in 1978. Redistricted to the 13th district and retired.
Charles Haight	Democratic	2nd	1867 – 1871	Elected in 1866. Retired.
George A. Halsey	Republican	5th	1867 – 1869	Elected in 1866. Lost re-election to Cleveland.
George A. Halsey	Republican	5th	1871 – 1873	Elected in 1870. Retired.
William Halstead	Whig	At-large	1837 – 1839	Elected in 1836. Re-elected, but the House declined to seat him.
William Halstead	Whig	At-large	1841 – 1843	Elected in 1840. Retired.
James A. Hamill	Democratic	10th	1907 – 1913	Elected in 1906. Redistricted to the 12th district.
James A. Hamill	Democratic	12th	1913 – 1921	Redistricted from the 10th district and re-elected in 1912. Retired.
Robert Hamilton	Democratic	4th	1873 – 1877	Elected in 1872. Retired.
James G. Hampton	Whig	1st	1845 – 1849	Elected in 1844. Retired.
Thomas M. Hand	Republican	2nd	1945 – 1956	Elected in 1944. Died.
Augustus A. Hardenbergh	Democratic	7th	1875 – 1879	Elected in 1874. Retired.
Augustus A. Hardenbergh	Democratic	7th	1881 – 1883	Elected in 1880. Retired.
Henry S. Harris	Democratic	4th	1881 – 1883	Elected in 1880. Lost re-election to Howey.
Archibald C. Hart	Democratic	6th	1912 – 1913	Elected to finish Hughes's term. Lost renomination to Martin.
Archibald C. Hart	Democratic	6th	1913 – 1917	Elected to finish Martin's term. Retired.
Edward J. Hart	Democratic	14th	1935 – 1955	Elected in 1934. Retired.
Fred A. Hartley Jr.	Republican	8th	1929 – 1933	Elected in 1928. Redistricted to the 10th district.
Fred A. Hartley Jr.	Republican	10th	1933 – 1949	Redistricted from the 8th district and re-elected in 1932. Retired.
Andrew K. Hay	Whig	1st	1849 – 1851	Elected in 1848. Retired.
John W. Hazelton	Republican	1st	1871 – 1875	Elected in 1870. Lost re-election to C. Sinnickson.
William Helms	Democratic-Republican	At-large	1801 – 1811	Elected in 1800. Retired.
Henry Helstoski	Democratic	9th	1965 – 1977	Elected in 1964. Lost re-election to Hollenbeck.
Thomas Henderson	Federalist	At-large	1795 – 1797	Elected in 1794. Lost re-election to Schureman.
John Hill	Republican	4th	1867 – 1873	Elected in 1866. Retired.
John Hill	Republican	5th	1881 – 1883	Elected in 1880. Retired.
George Hires	Republican	1st	1885 – 1889	Elected in 1884. Retired.
Harold G. Hoffman	Republican	3rd	1927 – 1931	Elected in 1926. Retired to become Motor Vehicle Commissioner of New Jersey.
George Holcombe	Democratic-Republican	At-large	1821 – 1825	Elected in 1820. Switched parties.
George Holcombe	Jacksonian	At-large	1825 – 1828	Re-elected in 1824 as a Jacksonian. Died.
Harold C. Hollenbeck	Republican	9th	1977 – 1983	Elected in 1976. Lost re-election to Torricelli.
Rush D. Holt Jr.	Democratic	12th	1999 – 2015	Elected in 1998. Retired.
James J. Howard	Democratic	3rd	1965 – 1988	Elected in 1964. Died.
Benjamin F. Howell	Republican	3rd	1895 – 1911	Elected in 1894. Lost re-election to Scully.
Charles R. Howell	Democratic	4th	1949 – 1955	Elected in 1948. Retired to run for U.S. senator.
Benjamin F. Howey	Republican	4th	1883 – 1885	Elected in 1882. Retired.
Jacob Hufty	Democratic-Republican	At-large	1809 – 1813	Elected in 1808. Redistricted to the 3rd district.
Jacob Hufty	Federalist	3rd	1813 – 1814	Redistricted from the at-large district and re-elected in 1813. Died.
Thomas H. Hughes	Anti-Jacksonian	At-large	1829 – 1833	Elected in 1828. Retired.
William Hughes	Democratic	6th	1903 – 1905	Elected in 1902. Lost re-election to Allen.
William Hughes	Democratic	6th	1907 – 1912	Elected in 1906. Resigned after appointment as judge of Court of Common Pleas of Passaic County.
William J. Hughes	Democratic	2nd	1975 – 1995	Elected in 1974. Retired.
John E. Hunt	Republican	1st	1967 – 1975	Elected in 1966. Lost re-election to Florio.
Elijah C. Hutchinson	Republican	4th	1915 – 1923	Elected in 1914. Lost re-election to Browne.
John Huyler	Democratic	4th	1857 – 1859	Elected in 1856. Lost re-election to Riggs as a Lecompton Democrat.
James H. Imlay	Federalist	At-large	1797 – 1799	Elected in 1797. Redistricted to the 4th district.
James H. Imlay	Federalist	4th	1799 – 1801	Redistricted from the at-large district and re-elected in 1798. Retired.
Walter S. Jeffries	Republican	2nd	1939 – 1941	Elected in 1938. Lost re-election to Wene.
Charles S. Joelson	Democratic	8th	1961 – 1969	Elected in 1960. Resigned to become judge of Superior Court of New Jersey.
Phineas Jones	Republican	6th	1881 – 1883	Elected in 1880. Retired.
John Kean	Republican	3rd	1883 – 1885	Elected in 1882. Lost re-election to Green.
John Kean	Republican	3rd	1887 – 1889	Elected in 1886. Lost re-election to Geissenhainer.
Robert W. Kean	Republican	12th	1939 – 1959	Elected in 1938. Retired to run for U.S. senator.
Thomas Kean Jr.	Republican	7th	2023 – present	Elected in 2022. Incumbent.
Edward A. Kenney	Democratic	9th	1933 – 1938	Elected in 1932. Died.
Joseph Kille	Democratic	At-large	1839 – 1841	Elected in 1838. Retired.
Andy Kim	Democratic	3rd	2019 – 2024	Elected in 2018. Resigned when appointed U.S. senator.
James G. King	Whig	5th	1849 – 1851	Elected in 1848. Retired.
Eugene F. Kinkead	Democratic	9th	1909 – 1913	Elected in 1908. Redistricted to the 8th district.
Eugene F. Kinkead	Democratic	8th	1913 – 1915	Redistricted from the 9th district and re-elected in 1912. Retired and resigned to become Sheriff of Hudson County
Charles Kinsey	Democratic-Republican	At-large	1817 – 1819	Elected in 1816. Lost re-election to Condit.
Charles Kinsey	Democratic-Republican	At-large	1820 – 1821	Elected to finish Condit's term. Retired.
Littleton Kirkpatrick	Democratic	4th	1843 – 1845	Elected in 1842. Retired.
Aaron Kitchell	Pro-Administration	At-large	1791 – 1793	Elected in 1791. Lost re-election to Cadwalader.
Aaron Kitchell	Pro-Administration	At-large	1795 – 1795	Elected to finish Clark's term. Switched parties prior to start of full term.
Aaron Kitchell	Federalist	At-large	1795 – 1797	Elected in 1794 as a Federalist. Lost re-election to Imlay.
Aaron Kitchell	Democratic-Republican	2nd	1799 – 1801	Elected in 1798. Retired.
Herbert Klein	Democratic	8th	1993 – 1995	Elected in 1992. Lost re-election.Lost re-election to Martini.
Paul J. Krebs	Democratic	12th	1965 – 1967	Elected in 1964. Retired.
John Lambert	Democratic-Republican	At-large	1805 – 1809	Elected in 1804. Retired.
Leonard Lance	Republican	7th	2009 – 2019	Elected in 2008. Lost re-election to Malinowski.
William M. Lanning	Republican	4th	1903 – 1904	Elected in 1902. Resigned on appointment as district judge of 3rd circuit.
Eugene W. Leake	Democratic	9th	1907 – 1909	Elected in 1906. Retired.
Thomas Lee	Jacksonian	At-large	1833 – 1837	Elected in 1832. Retired.
Joseph A. LeFante	Democratic	14th	1977 – 1978	Elected in 1976. Retired and resigned early.
Frederick R. Lehlbach	Republican	10th	1915 – 1933	Elected in 1914. Redistricted to the 12th district.
Frederick R. Lehlbach	Republican	12th	1933 – 1937	Redistricted from the 10th district and re-elected in 1932. Lost re-election to Towey.
Herman Lehlbach	Republican	6th	1885 – 1891	Elected in 1884. Retired.
Samuel Lilly	Democratic	3rd	1853 – 1855	Elected in 1852. Retired.
James Linn	Democratic-Republican	3rd	1799 – 1801	Elected in 1798. Retired.
John Linn	Democratic-Republican	At-large	1817 – 1821	Elected in 1816. Died.
Frank LoBiondo	Republican	2nd	1995 – 2019	Elected in 1994. Retired.
Henry C. Loudenslager	Republican	1st	1893 – 1911	Elected in 1892. Died.
Tom MacArthur	Republican	3rd	2015 – 2019	Elected in 2014. Lost re-election to Kim.
Andrew Maguire	Democratic	7th	1975 – 1981	Elected in 1974. Lost re-election to Roukema.
Tom Malinowski	Democratic	7th	2019 – 2023	Elected in 2018. Lost re-election to Kean Jr.
Joseph J. Maraziti	Republican	13th	1973 – 1975	Elected in 1972. Lost re-election to Meyner.
Lewis J. Martin	Democratic	6th	1913 – 1913	Elected in 1912. Died.
William J. Martini	Republican	8th	1995 – 1997	Elected in 1994. Lost re-election to Pascrell.
Frank A. Mathews Jr.	Republican	4th	1945 – 1949	Elected to finish Powers's term. Retired.
James Matlack	Democratic-Republican	At-large	1821 – 1825	Elected in 1820. Retired.
George C. Maxwell	Democratic-Republican	At-large	1811 – 1813	Elected in 1810. Retired.
John P. B. Maxwell	Whig	At-large	1837 – 1839	Elected in 1836. Re-elected, but the House declined to seat him.
John P. B. Maxwell	Whig	At-large	1841 – 1843	Elected in 1840. Retired.
William McAdoo	Democratic	7th	1883 – 1891	Elected in 1882. Lost renomination to McDonald.
Walter I. McCoy	Democratic	8th	1911 – 1913	Elected in 1910. Redistricted to the 9th district.
Walter I. McCoy	Democratic	9th	1913 – 1914	Redistricted from the 8th district and re-elected in 1912. Resigned on appointment as Associate Justice of the Supreme Court of the District of Columbia.
Allan L. McDermott	Democratic	7th	1900 – 1903	Elected to finish Daly's term. Redistricted to the 10th district.
Allan L. McDermott	Democratic	10th	1903 – 1907	Redistricted from the 7th district and re-elected in 1902. Retired.
Edward F. McDonald	Democratic	7th	1891 – 1892	Elected in 1890. Died.
Thomas McEwan Jr.	Republican	7th	1895 – 1899	Elected in 1894. Retired.
Cornelius A. McGlennon	Democratic	8th	1919 – 1921	Elected in 1918. Lost re-election to Taylor.
Thomas C. McGrath Jr.	Democratic	2nd	1965 – 1967	Elected in 1964. Lost re-election to Sandman.
LaMonica McIver	Democratic	10th	2024 – present	Elected to finish Payne, Jr.'s term. Incumbent.
Donald H. McLean	Republican	6th	1933 – 1945	Elected in 1932. Retired.
Frank J. McNulty	Democratic	8th	1923 – 1925	Elected in 1922. Lost re-election to Taylor.
Analilia Mejia	Democratic	11th	2026 – present	Elected to finish Sherrill's term. Incumbent.
Bob Menendez	Democratic	13th	1993 – 2006	Elected in 1992. Resigned when appointed U.S. senator.
Rob Menendez	Democratic	8th	2023 – present	Elected in 2022. Incumbent.
Helen S. Meyner	Democratic	13th	1975 – 1979	Elected in 1974. Lost re-election to Courter.
George Middleton	Democratic	2nd	1863 – 1865	Elected in 1862. Lost re-election to Newell.
Daniel F. Minahan	Democratic	9th	1919 – 1921	Elected in 1918. Lost re-election to R. Parker.
Daniel F. Minahan	Democratic	9th	1923 – 1925	Elected in 1922. Lost re-election to Fort.
Joseph G. Minish	Democratic	11th	1963 – 1985	Elected in 1962. Lost re-election to Gallo.
Paul J. Moore	Democratic	8th	1927 – 1929	Elected in 1926. Lost re-election to Hartley.
William Moore	Republican	1st	1867 – 1871	Elected in 1866. Lost renomination to Hazelton.
James Morgan	Democratic-Republican	At-large	1811 – 1813	Elected in 1810. Redistricted to the 2nd district and lost re-election to Schureman and Stockton.
James Mott	Democratic-Republican	At-large	1801 – 1805	Elected in 1800. Retired.
Thomas Newbold	Democratic-Republican	At-large	1807 – 1813	Elected in 1806. Retired.
William A. Newell	Whig	2nd	1847 – 1851	Elected in 1846. Retired.
William A. Newell	Republican	2nd	1865 – 1867	Elected in 1864. Lost re-election to Haight.
John T. Nixon	Republican	1st	1859 – 1863	Elected in 1858. Retired.
Donald Norcross	Democratic	1st	2014 – present	Elected to finish Andrews's term. Incumbent.
Mary T. Norton	Democratic	12th	1925 – 1933	Elected in 1924. Redistricted to the 13th district.
Mary T. Norton	Democratic	13th	1933 – 1951	Redistricted from the 12th district and re-elected in 1932. Retired.
Charles F. X. O'Brien	Democratic	12th	1921 – 1925	Elected in 1920. Retired to become registrar of records of Hudson County.
Edward L. O'Neill	Democratic	11th	1937 – 1939	Elected in 1936. Lost re-election to Vreeland.
Archibald E. Olpp	Republican	11th	1921 – 1923	Elected in 1920. Lost re-election to Eagan.
Frank C. Osmers Jr.	Republican	9th	1939 – 1943	Elected in 1938. Retired to become a second lieutenant in the 77th Infantry Division.
Frank C. Osmers Jr.	Republican	9th	1951 – 1965	Elected to finish Towe's term. Lost re-election to Helstoski.
Frank Pallone	Democratic	3rd	1988 – 1993	Elected to finish Howard's term. Redistricted to the 6th district.
Frank Pallone	Democratic	6th	1993 – present	Redistricted from the 3rd district and re-elected in 1992. Incumbent.
Michael J. Pappas	Republican	12th	1997 – 1999	Elected in 1996. Lost re-election to Holt.
James Parker	Jacksonian	At-large	1833 – 1837	Elected in 1832. Retired.
Richard W. Parker	Republican	6th	1895 – 1903	Elected in 1894. Redistricted to the 7th district.
Richard W. Parker	Republican	7th	1903 – 1911	Redistricted from the 6th district and re-elected in 1902. Lost re-election to Townsend.
Richard W. Parker	Republican	9th	1914 – 1919	Elected to finish McCoy's term. Lost re-election to Minahan.
Richard W. Parker	Republican	9th	1921 – 1923	Elected in 1920. Lost re-election to Minahan.
Bill Pascrell	Democratic	8th	1997 – 2013	Elected in 1996. Redistricted to the 9th district.
Bill Pascrell	Democratic	9th	2013 – 2024	Redistricted from the 8th district and re-elected in 2012. Died.
Edward J. Patten	Democratic	15th	1963 – 1981	Elected in 1962. Retired.
Francis F. Patterson Jr.	Republican	1st	1920 – 1927	Elected to finish Browning's term. Lost renomination to Wolverton.
Donald M. Payne	Democratic	10th	1989 – 2012	Elected in 1988. Died.
Donald Payne Jr.	Democratic	10th	2012 – 2024	Elected to finish his father's term. Died.
Thomas B. Peddie	Republican	6th	1877 – 1879	Elected in 1876. Retired.
Alexander C. M. Pennington	Whig	5th	1853 – 1855	Elected in 1852. Switched parties.
Alexander C. M. Pennington	Opposition	5th	1855 – 1857	Re-elected in 1854 as an Opposition Party candidate. Retired.
William Pennington	Republican	5th	1859 – 1861	Elected in 1858. Lost re-election to Perry.
Randolph Perkins	Republican	6th	1921 – 1933	Elected in 1920. Redistricted to the 7th district.
Randolph Perkins	Republican	7th	1933 – 1936	Redistricted from the 6th district and re-elected in 1932. Died.
Nehemiah Perry	Democratic	5th	1861 – 1865	Elected in 1860. Retired.
William W. Phelps	Republican	5th	1873 – 1875	Elected in 1872. Lost re-election to Cutler.
William W. Phelps	Republican	5th	1883 – 1889	Elected in 1882. Retired.
James N. Pidcock	Democratic	4th	1885 – 1889	Elected in 1884. Retired.
Isaac Pierson	Anti-Jacksonian	At-large	1827 – 1831	Elected in 1826. Lost re-election to S. Condit.
Mahlon Pitney	Republican	4th	1895 – 1899	Elected in 1894. Re-elected, but resigned on election to New Jersey State Senate.
Nellie Pou	Democratic	9th	2025 – present	Elected in 2024. Incumbent.
D. Lane Powers	Republican	4th	1933 – 1945	Elected in 1932. Resigned to become a member of the Public Utilities Commission of New Jersey
Le Gage Pratt	Democratic	8th	1907 – 1909	Elected in 1906. Lost re-election to Wiley.
Rodman M. Price	Democratic	5th	1851 – 1853	Elected in 1850. Lost re-election to A. Pennington.
John H. Pugh	Republican	2nd	1877 – 1879	Elected in 1876. Lost re-election to H.B. Smith.
Amos H. Radcliffe	Republican	7th	1919 – 1923	Elected in 1918. Lost renomination to Seger.
John R. Ramsey	Republican	6th	1917 – 1921	Elected in 1916. Lost renomination to Perkins.
James F. Randolph	Anti-Jacksonian	At-large	1828 – 1833	Elected to finish Holcombe's term. Retired.
Joseph F. Randolph	Whig	At-large	1837 – 1843	Elected in 1836. Retired.
Jetur R. Riggs	Democratic	4th	1859 – 1861	Elected in 1858. Retired.
Matthew J. Rinaldo	Republican	12th	1973 – 1983	Elected in 1972. Redistricted to the 7th district.
Matthew J. Rinaldo	Republican	7th	1983 – 1993	Redistricted from the 12th district and Re-elected in 1982. Retired.
George R. Robbins	Opposition	2nd	1855 – 1857	Elected in 1854. Switched parties.
George R. Robbins	Republican	2nd	1857 – 1859	Re-elected in 1856 as a Republican. Retired.
George M. Robeson	Republican	1st	1879 – 1883	Elected in 1878. Lost re-election to Ferrell.
Peter W. Rodino Jr.	Democratic	10th	1949 – 1989	Elected in 1948. Retired.
Robert A. Roe	Democratic	8th	1969 – 1993	Elected to finish Joelson's term. Retired.
Andrew J. Rogers	Democratic	4th	1863 – 1867	Elected in 1862. Lost re-election to Hill.
Miles Ross	Democratic	3rd	1875 – 1883	Elected in 1874. Lost re-election to J. Kean.
Steve Rothman	Democratic	9th	1997 – 2013	Elected in 1996. Lost renomination to Pascrell.
Marge Roukema	Republican	7th	1981 – 1983	Elected in 1980. Redistricted to the 5th district.
Marge Roukema	Republican	5th	1983 – 2003	Redistricted from 7th district and re-elected in 1982. Retired.
John Runk	Whig	3rd	1845 – 1847	Elected in 1844. Lost re-election to Edsall.
Jon Runyan	Republican	3rd	2011 – 2015	Elected in 2010. Retired.
Daniel B. Ryall	Democratic	At-large	1839 – 1841	Elected in 1838. Retired.
Joshua S. Salmon	Democratic	4th	1899 – 1902	Elected to finish Pitney's term. Died.
Charles W. Sandman Jr.	Republican	2nd	1967 – 1975	Elected in 1966. Lost re-election to W.J. Hughes.
Jim Saxton	Republican	13th	1984 – 1993	Elected to finish Forsythe's term. Redistricted to the 3rd district.
Jim Saxton	Republican	3rd	1993 – 2009	Redistricted from the 13th district and re-elected in 1992. Retired.
Ferdinand Schureman Schenck	Jacksonian	At-large	1833 – 1837	Elected in 1832. Retired.
James Schureman	Pro-Administration	At-large	1789 – 1791	Elected in 1789. Lost re-election to Dayton.
James Schureman	Federalist	At-large	1797 – 1799	Elected in 1797. Redistricted to the 5th district and lost re-election to Davenport.
James Schureman	Federalist	2nd	1813 – 1815	Elected in 1813. Retired.
Isaac W. Scudder	Republican	7th	1873 – 1875	Elected in 1872. Retired.
John A. Scudder	Democratic-Republican	At-large	1810 – 1811	Elected to finish Cox's term. Retired.
Thomas J. Scully	Democratic	3rd	1911 – 1921	Elected in 1910. Retired.
George N. Seger	Republican	7th	1923 – 1933	Elected in 1922. Redistricted to the 8th district.
George N. Seger	Republican	8th	1933 – 1940	Redistricted from the 7th district and re-elected in 1932. Died.
Mikie Sherrill	Democratic	11th	2019 – 2025	Elected in 2018. Resigned after winning the New Jersey gubernatorial election.
William N. Shinn	Jacksonian	At-large	1833 – 1837	Elected in 1832. Retired.
Alfred D. Sieminski	Democratic	13th	1951 – 1959	Elected in 1950. Lost renomination to Gallagher.
Clement H. Sinnickson	Republican	1st	1875 – 1879	Elected in 1874. Retired.
Thomas Sinnickson	Pro-Administration	At-large	1789 – 1791	Elected in 1789. Lost re-election to A. Clark.
Thomas Sinnickson	Federalist	At-large	1797 – 1799	Elected in 1797. Redistricted to the 5th district but unknown if then retired or lost.
Thomas Sinnickson	Anti-Jacksonian	At-large	1828 – 1829	Elected to finish Thompson's term. Retired.
Albio Sires	Democratic	13th	2006 – 2013	Elected to finish Menendez's term. Redistricted to the 8th district.
Albio Sires	Democratic	8th	2013 – 2023	Redistricted from the 13th district and re-elected in 2012. Retired.
Charles Sitgreaves	Democratic	3rd	1865 – 1869	Elected in 1864. Retired.
Charles Skelton	Democratic	2nd	1851 – 1855	Elected in 1850. Retired.
James Sloan	Democratic-Republican	At-large	1803 – 1809	Elected in 1803. Retired.
Bernard Smith	Democratic-Republican	At-large	1819 – 1821	Elected in 1818. Retired.
Chris Smith	Republican	4th	1981 – present	Elected in 1980. Incumbent.
Hezekiah B. Smith	Democratic	2nd	1879 – 1881	Elected in 1878. Lost re-election to Brewer.
Isaac Smith	Federalist	At-large	1795 – 1797	Elected in 1794. Retired.
Henry Southard	Democratic-Republican	At-large	1801 – 1811	Elected in 1800. Retired.
Henry Southard	Democratic-Republican	At-large	1815 – 1821	Elected in 1814. Retired.
Isaac Southard	Anti-Jacksonian	At-large	1831 – 1833	Elected in 1830. Lost re-election to Schenck.
John F. Starr	Republican	1st	1863 – 1867	Elected in 1862. Retired.
William G. Steele	Democratic	3rd	1861 – 1865	Elected in 1860. Retired.
James F. Stewart	Republican	5th	1895 – 1903	Elected in 1894. Lost re-election to C. Fowler.
Percy H. Stewart	Democratic	5th	1931 – 1933	Elected to finish Ackerman's term. Retired to run for U.S. senator.
Richard Stockton	Federalist	2nd	1813 – 1815	Elected in 1813. Retired.
Charles C. Stratton	Whig	At-large	1837 – 1839	Elected in 1836. Re-elected, but the House declined to seat him.
Charles C. Stratton	Whig	At-large	1841 – 1843	Elected in 1840. Retired.
John L. N. Stratton	Republican	2nd	1859 – 1863	Elected in 1858. Retired.
Nathan T. Stratton	Democratic	1st	1851 – 1855	Elected in 1850. Retired.
Frank L. Sundstrom	Republican	11th	1943 – 1949	Elected in 1942. Lost re-election to Addonizio.
William H. Sutphin	Democratic	3rd	1931 – 1943	Elected in 1930. Lost re-election to Auchincloss.
Samuel Swan	Democratic-Republican	At-large	1821 – 1825	Elected in 1820. Switched parties.
Samuel Swan	Anti-Jacksonian	At-large	1825 – 1831	Re-elected in 1824 as an Anti-Jacksonian. Retired.
George Sykes	Democratic	2nd	1843 – 1845	Elected in 1842. Retired.
George Sykes	Democratic	2nd	1845 – 1847	Elected to finish Wright's term. Retired.
Herbert W. Taylor	Republican	8th	1921 – 1923	Elected in 1920. Lost renomination to Warren P. Coon.
Herbert W. Taylor	Republican	8th	1925 – 1927	Elected in 1924. Lost re-election to P. Moore.
Frederick H. Teese	Democratic	6th	1875 – 1877	Elected in 1874. Renominated but declined.
J. Parnell Thomas	Republican	7th	1937 – 1950	Elected in 1936; Resigned upon being convicted of fraud.
Frank Thompson Jr.	Democratic	4th	1955 – 1980	Elected in 1954. Lost re-election to C. Smith and resigned early.
Hedge Thompson	Anti-Jacksonian	At-large	1827 – 1828	Elected in 1826. Died.
Mark Thomson	Federalist	At-large	1795 – 1799	Elected in 1794. Redistricted to the 2nd district and lost re-election to Kitchell.
Robert G. Torricelli	Democratic	9th	1983 – 1997	Elected in 1982. Retired to run for U.S. senator.
Harry Lancaster Towe	Republican	9th	1943 – 1951	Elected in 1942. Resigned to become Assistant Attorney General of New Jersey for Bergen County.
Frank William Towey Jr.	Democratic	12th	1937 – 1939	Elected in 1936. Lost re-election to R. Kean.
Edward W. Townsend	Democratic	7th	1911 – 1913	Elected in 1910. Redistricted to the 10th district.
Edward W. Townsend	Democratic	10th	1913 – 1915	Redistricted from the 7th district and re-elected in 1912. Lost re-election to F. Lehlbach.
Ebenezer Tucker	Anti-Jacksonian	At-large	1825 – 1829	Elected in 1824. Retired.
T. James Tumulty	Democratic	14th	1955 – 1957	Elected in 1954. Lost re-election to Dellay.
William E. Tuttle Jr.	Democratic	5th	1911 – 1915	Elected in 1910. Lost re-election to Capstick.
George Vail	Democratic	4th	1853 – 1857	Elected in 1852. Retired.
John Van Dyke	Whig	4th	1847 – 1851	Elected in 1846. Retired.
Marshall Van Winkle	Republican	9th	1905 – 1907	Elected in 1904. Retired.
Charles H. Voorhis	Republican	5th	1879 – 1881	Elected in 1878. Retired.
Albert L. Vreeland	Republican	11th	1939 – 1943	Elected in 1938. Retired to serve in the military.
Peter D. Vroom	Democratic	At-large	1839 – 1841	Elected in 1838. Lost re-election to Yorke.
George M. Wallhauser	Republican	12th	1959 – 1965	Elected in 1958. Retired.
Allan B. Walsh	Democratic	4th	1913 – 1915	Elected in 1912. Lost re-election to Hutchinson.
Marcus Lawrence Ward	Republican	6th	1873 – 1875	Elected in 1872. Lost re-election to Teese.
Thomas Ward	Democratic-Republican	1st	1813 – 1815	Elected in 1813. Redistricted to the at-large district.
Thomas Ward	Democratic-Republican	At-large	1815 – 1817	Redistricted from the 1st district and re-elected in 1814. Retired.
Elmer H. Wene	Democratic	2nd	1937 – 1939	Elected in 1936. Lost re-election to Jeffries.
Elmer H. Wene	Democratic	2nd	1941 – 1945	Elected in 1940. Retired to run for U.S. senator.
William B. Widnall	Republican	7th	1950 – 1974	Elected to finish Thomas's term. Lost re-election and resigned early.
Isaac Wildrick	Democratic	3rd	1849 – 1853	Elected in 1848. Rrtired.
William H. Wiley	Republican	8th	1903 – 1907	Elected in 1902. Lost re-election to Pratt.
William H. Wiley	Republican	8th	1909 – 1911	Elected in 1908. Lost re-election to McCoy.
Harrison A. Williams Jr.	Democratic	6th	1953 – 1957	Elected to finish Case's term. Lost re-election to F. Dwyer.
Charles A. Wolverton	Republican	1st	1927 – 1959	Elected in 1926. Retired.
Ira W. Wood	Republican	4th	1904 – 1913	Elected to finish Lanning's term. Retired.
Jacob R. Wortendyke	Democratic	5th	1857 – 1859	Elected in 1856. Lost re-election to W. Pennington.
Edwin R. V. Wright	Democratic	5th	1865 – 1867	Elected in 1864. Retired.
Samuel G. Wright	Whig	2nd	1845 – 1845	Elected in 1844. Died.
William Wright	Whig	5th	1843 – 1847	Elected in 1842. Retired to run for governor.
Thomas J. Yorke	Whig	At-large	1837 – 1839	Elected in 1836. Re-elected, but the House declined to seat him.
Thomas J. Yorke	Whig	At-large	1841 – 1843	Elected in 1840. Retired.
Dick Zimmer	Republican	12th	1991 – 1997	Elected in 1990. Retired to run for U.S. senator.

== Key ==
Key to party colors and abbreviations for members of the U.S. Congress and other politicians or officials
Alaskan Independence (AKIP) Know Nothing (KN) American Labor (AL) Anti-Jacksonian (Anti-J); National Republican (NR) Anti-Administration (AA) Anti-Masonic (Anti-M) Conservative (Con) Covenant (Cov)	Democratic (D) Democratic–Farmer–Labor (DFL) Democratic–NPL (D-NPL) Dixiecrat (Dix), States' Rights (SR) Democratic-Republican (DR) Farmer–Labor (FL) Federalist (F); Pro-Administration (PA)	Free Soil (FS) Fusion (Fus) Greenback (GB) Independence (IPM) Jacksonian (J) Liberal (Lib) Libertarian (L) National Union (NU)	Nonpartisan League (NPL) Nullifier (N) Opposition Northern (O); Opposition Southern (O) Populist (Pop) Progressive (Prog) Prohibition (Proh) Readjuster (Rea)	Republican (R) Silver (Sv) Silver Republican (SvR) Socialist (Soc) Union (U) Unconditional Union (UU) Vermont Progressive (VP) Whig (W)	Independent (I) Nonpartisan (NP)

== See also ==
- List of United States senators from New Jersey
- New Jersey's congressional delegations
- New Jersey's congressional districts

== Notes ==
- House of Representatives List of Members
