= New Jersey's 11th congressional district =

U.S. House district for New Jersey

Coordinates: 40.90°N 74.60°W

- Interactive map of district boundaries since January 3, 2023
- Representative: Analilia Mejia; D–Glen Ridge
- Distribution: 96.21% urban; 3.79% rural
- Population (2025): 809,185
- Median household income: $147,505
- Ethnicity: 61.6% White; 16.5% Hispanic; 11.8% Asian; 6.1% Black; 3.2% Two or more races; 0.7% other
- Cook PVI: D+5

New Jersey's 11th congressional district is a congressional district based in the suburbs of northern New Jersey. It is centered in Morris County and encompasses portions of Essex and Passaic counties. The district is the wealthiest one statewide and the eleventh wealthiest nationwide, with 32.9% of households earning over $200,000 annually.

Democrat Analilia Mejia is the district's representative and took office on April 20, 2026 following the resignation of now-Governor Mikie Sherrill.

== History ==
The 11th congressional district was created in 1913 based on the results of the 1910 census, and was centered in Essex County. Voters consistently elected Democrats for 36 years under Hugh Joseph Addonizio and Joseph Minish.

The 1980 redistricting shifted the district to encompass Republican-leaning Morris County. Republican Dean Gallo defeated 22-year incumbent Democrat Joseph Minish in 1984, and the district became one of the most reliably Republican in the Northeast.

The district has shifted towards Democrats since then. In the 2018 elections, Democrat Mikie Sherrill won the district following the retirement of 24-year incumbent Rodney Frelinghuysen. Sherrill was elected governor of New Jersey in 2025 and resigned from office on November 20 of that year. Democrats nominated Analilia Mejia as her replacement following a competitive primary. She defeated Republican Joe Hathaway in both the special election and in the November elections.

In 2023, Sussex County was removed from the district and was replaced by Essex County municipalities Millburn and Belleville, but otherwise still contains most of Morris County. Compared to the previous configuration, the current district gives Democrats an advantage over Republicans.

== Counties and municipalities in the district ==
For the 118th and successive Congresses (based on redistricting following the 2020 census), the district contains all or portions of three counties and 46 municipalities.

Essex County: (15)

Belleville, Bloomfield, Cedar Grove, Fairfield, Glen Ridge, Livingston, Maplewood, Millburn, Montclair (part; also 10th; includes Montclair State University and Upper Montclair), North Caldwell, Nutley, Roseland, South Orange, West Caldwell.

Morris County: (27)

Boonton, Boonton Township, Butler, Chatham Borough, Chatham Township, Denville Township, Dover, East Hanover, Florham Park, Hanover Township, Harding Township, Jefferson Township, Kinnelon, Lincoln Park, Madison, Mendham Township (part; also 7th), Montville, Morris Plains, Morris Township, Morristown, Mountain Lakes, Parsippany–Troy Hills, Pequannock Township, Randolph, Riverdale, Rockaway, Rockaway Township, Victory Gardens.

Passaic County: (4)

Little Falls, Totowa, Wayne (part; also 9th; includes Packanack Lake, William Paterson University of New Jersey, and part of Preakness), Woodland Park.

== Recent election results from statewide races ==
Year	Office	Results
2008	President	Obama 52% - 47%
2012	President	Obama 53% - 47%
2016	President	Clinton 54% - 43%
2017	Governor	Murphy 55% - 43%
2018	Senate	Menendez 53% - 45%
2020	President	Biden 58% - 41%
2020	Senate	Booker 57% - 41%
2021	Governor	Murphy 52% - 48%
2024	President	Harris 53% - 45%
2024	Senate	Kim 54% - 44%
2025	Governor	Sherrill 57% - 42%

== Recent election results ==
=== 2012 ===
New Jersey's 11th congressional district, 2012
Party	Candidate	Votes	%
Republican	Rodney Frelinghuysen (incumbent)	182,239	58.8
Democratic	John Arvanites	123,935	40.0
Independent	Barry Berlin	3,725	1.2
Total votes		309,899	100.0
Republican hold			

=== 2014 ===
New Jersey's 11th congressional district, 2014
Party	Candidate	Votes	%
Republican	Rodney Frelinghuysen (incumbent)	109,455	62.6
Democratic	Mark Dunec	65,477	37.4
Total votes		174,932	100.0
Republican hold			

=== 2016 ===
New Jersey's 11th congressional district, 2016
Party	Candidate	Votes	%
Republican	Rodney Frelinghuysen (incumbent)	194,299	58.0
Democratic	Joseph M. Wenzel	130,162	38.9
Independent	Thomas Depasquale	7,056	2.1
Libertarian	Jeff Hetrick	3,475	1.0
Total votes		334,992	100.0
Republican hold			

=== 2018 ===
In January 2018, 12-term incumbent Republican Rodney Frelinghuysen announced that he would not seek re-election; earlier, leading political observers had rated the district as a "toss-up" in the November 2018 election. Mikie Sherrill, a former Navy helicopter pilot and federal prosecutor, was the Democratic nominee in 2018. Assemblyman Jay Webber of New Jersey's 26th Assembly District was the Republican nominee. Attorney Ryan Martinez was the Libertarian Party nominee. On November 6, 2018, Sherrill prevailed by an unexpectedly large margin, defeating Webber 56.8%-42.1%. The district shifted 33% towards the Democrats.

New Jersey's 11th congressional district, 2018
Party	Candidate	Votes	%
Democratic	Mikie Sherrill	183,684	56.8
Republican	Jay Webber	136,322	42.1
Independent	Robert Crook	2,182	0.7
Libertarian	Ryan Martinez	1,386	0.4
Total votes		323,574	100.0
Democratic gain from Republican			

=== 2020 ===
New Jersey's 11th congressional district, 2020
Party	Candidate	Votes	%
Democratic	Mikie Sherrill (incumbent)	235,163	53.3
Republican	Rosemary Becchi	206,013	46.7
Total votes		441,176	100.0
Democratic hold			

=== 2022 ===
New Jersey's 11th congressional district, 2022
Party	Candidate	Votes	%
Democratic	Mikie Sherrill (incumbent)	161,436	59.0
Republican	Paul DeGroot	109,952	40.2
Libertarian	Joseph Biasco	2,276	0.8
Total votes		273,664	100.0
Democratic hold			

=== 2024 ===
New Jersey's 11th congressional district, 2024
Party	Candidate	Votes	%
Democratic	Mikie Sherrill (incumbent)	222,583	56.5
Republican	Joseph Belnome	164,556	41.8
Green	Lily Benavides	4,780	1.2
Independent	Joshua Lanzara	1,832	0.5
Total votes		393,751	100.0
Democratic hold			

=== 2026 special ===
2026 New Jersey's 11th congressional district special election
Party	Candidate	Votes	%
Democratic	Analilia Mejia	81,825	60.18
Republican	Joe Hathaway	53,520	39.36
Hope For Tomorrow!	Alan Bond	625	0.46
Total votes		135,970	100.00
Democratic hold			

== List of members representing the district ==
Member	Party	Years	Cong ress	Electoral history	Counties/Towns
District established March 4, 1913
John J. Eagan (Weehawken)	Democratic	March 4, 1913 – March 3, 1921	63rd 64th 65th 66th	Elected in 1912. Re-elected in 1914. Re-elected in 1916. Re-elected in 1918. Lost re-election.	1913–1933: Parts of Hudson (Guttenberg, Hoboken, North Bergen, Secaucus, Union City, Weehawken, West New York)
Archibald E. Olpp (West Hoboken)	Republican	March 4, 1921 – March 3, 1923	67th	Elected in 1920. Lost re-election.	1913–1933: Parts of Hudson (Guttenberg, Hoboken, North Bergen, Secaucus, Union City, Weehawken, West New York)
John J. Eagan (Weehawken)	Democratic	March 4, 1923 – March 3, 1925	68th	Elected in 1922. Lost renomination.	1913–1933: Parts of Hudson (Guttenberg, Hoboken, North Bergen, Secaucus, Union City, Weehawken, West New York)
Oscar L. Auf der Heide (West New York)	Democratic	March 4, 1925 – March 3, 1933	69th 70th 71st 72nd	Elected in 1924. Re-elected in 1926. Re-elected in 1928. Re-elected in 1930. Redistricted to the 14th district.	1913–1933: Parts of Hudson (Guttenberg, Hoboken, North Bergen, Secaucus, Union City, Weehawken, West New York)
Peter Angelo Cavicchia (Newark)	Republican	March 4, 1933 – January 3, 1937	73rd 74th	Redistricted from the 9th district and re-elected in 1932. Re-elected in 1934. Lost re-election.	1933–1965: Parts of Essex (the Oranges and parts of Newark)
Edward L. O'Neill (Newark)	Democratic	January 3, 1937 – January 3, 1939	75th	Elected in 1936. Lost re-election.	1933–1965: Parts of Essex (the Oranges and parts of Newark)
Albert L. Vreeland (East Orange)	Republican	January 3, 1939 – January 3, 1943	76th 77th	Elected in 1938. Re-elected in 1940. Retired to serve in the military.	1933–1965: Parts of Essex (the Oranges and parts of Newark)
Frank Sundstrom (East Orange)	Republican	January 3, 1943 – January 3, 1949	78th 79th 80th	Elected in 1942. Re-elected in 1944. Re-elected in 1946. Lost re-election.	1933–1965: Parts of Essex (the Oranges and parts of Newark)
Hugh Joseph Addonizio (Newark)	Democratic	January 3, 1949 – June 30, 1962	81st 82nd 83rd 84th 85th 86th 87th	Elected in 1948. Re-elected in 1950. Re-elected in 1952. Re-elected in 1954. Re-elected in 1956. Re-elected in 1958. Re-elected in 1960. Resigned to become Mayor of Newark.	1933–1965: Parts of Essex (the Oranges and parts of Newark)
Vacant		June 30, 1962 – January 3, 1963	87th		1933–1965: Parts of Essex (the Oranges and parts of Newark)
Joseph Minish (West Orange)	Democratic	January 3, 1963 – January 3, 1985	88th 89th 90th 91st 92nd 93rd 94th 95th 96th 97th 98th	Elected in 1962. Re-elected in 1964. Re-elected in 1966. Re-elected in 1968. Re-elected in 1970. Re-elected in 1972. Re-elected in 1974. Re-elected in 1976. Re-elected in 1978. Re-elected in 1980. Re-elected in 1982. Lost re-election after redistricting.	1933–1965: Parts of Essex (the Oranges and parts of Newark)
Joseph Minish (West Orange)	Democratic	January 3, 1963 – January 3, 1985	88th 89th 90th 91st 92nd 93rd 94th 95th 96th 97th 98th	Elected in 1962. Re-elected in 1964. Re-elected in 1966. Re-elected in 1968. Re-elected in 1970. Re-elected in 1972. Re-elected in 1974. Re-elected in 1976. Re-elected in 1978. Re-elected in 1980. Re-elected in 1982. Lost re-election after redistricting.	1963–1967: Parts of Essex (Maplewood, the Oranges, Verona, and parts of Newark)
Joseph Minish (West Orange)	Democratic	January 3, 1963 – January 3, 1985	88th 89th 90th 91st 92nd 93rd 94th 95th 96th 97th 98th	Elected in 1962. Re-elected in 1964. Re-elected in 1966. Re-elected in 1968. Re-elected in 1970. Re-elected in 1972. Re-elected in 1974. Re-elected in 1976. Re-elected in 1978. Re-elected in 1980. Re-elected in 1982. Lost re-election after redistricting.	1967–1973: Parts of Essex (Maplewood, the Oranges, and parts of Newark)
Joseph Minish (West Orange)	Democratic	January 3, 1963 – January 3, 1985	88th 89th 90th 91st 92nd 93rd 94th 95th 96th 97th 98th	Elected in 1962. Re-elected in 1964. Re-elected in 1966. Re-elected in 1968. Re-elected in 1970. Re-elected in 1972. Re-elected in 1974. Re-elected in 1976. Re-elected in 1978. Re-elected in 1980. Re-elected in 1982. Lost re-election after redistricting.	1973–1983: Parts of Essex, Passaic (Little Falls and West Paterson), and Union (Hillside)
Joseph Minish (West Orange)	Democratic	January 3, 1963 – January 3, 1985	88th 89th 90th 91st 92nd 93rd 94th 95th 96th 97th 98th	Elected in 1962. Re-elected in 1964. Re-elected in 1966. Re-elected in 1968. Re-elected in 1970. Re-elected in 1972. Re-elected in 1974. Re-elected in 1976. Re-elected in 1978. Re-elected in 1980. Re-elected in 1982. Lost re-election after redistricting.	1983–1985: Parts of Bergen, Essex, Hudson, Morris, and Passaic
Dean Gallo (Parsippany-Troy Hills)	Republican	January 3, 1985 – November 6, 1994	99th 100th 101st 102nd 103rd	Elected in 1984. Re-elected in 1986. Re-elected in 1988. Re-elected in 1990. Re-elected in 1992. Announced retirement, then died before the end of the term.	1985–1993: Parts of Essex, Morris, Sussex, and Warren
Dean Gallo (Parsippany-Troy Hills)	Republican	January 3, 1985 – November 6, 1994	99th 100th 101st 102nd 103rd	Elected in 1984. Re-elected in 1986. Re-elected in 1988. Re-elected in 1990. Re-elected in 1992. Announced retirement, then died before the end of the term.	1993–2003: Morris and parts of Essex, Passaic, Somerset, Sussex
Vacant		November 6, 1994 – January 3, 1995	103rd		1993–2003: Morris and parts of Essex, Passaic, Somerset, Sussex
Rodney Frelinghuysen (Morristown)	Republican	January 3, 1995 – January 3, 2019	104th 105th 106th 107th 108th 109th 110th 111th 112th 113th 114th 115th	Elected in 1994. Re-elected in 1996. Re-elected in 1998. Re-elected in 2000. Re-elected in 2002. Re-elected in 2004. Re-elected in 2006. Re-elected in 2008. Re-elected in 2010. Re-elected in 2012. Re-elected in 2014. Re-elected in 2016. Retired.	1993–2003: Morris and parts of Essex, Passaic, Somerset, Sussex
Rodney Frelinghuysen (Morristown)	Republican	January 3, 1995 – January 3, 2019	104th 105th 106th 107th 108th 109th 110th 111th 112th 113th 114th 115th	Elected in 1994. Re-elected in 1996. Re-elected in 1998. Re-elected in 2000. Re-elected in 2002. Re-elected in 2004. Re-elected in 2006. Re-elected in 2008. Re-elected in 2010. Re-elected in 2012. Re-elected in 2014. Re-elected in 2016. Retired.	2003–2013: Morris and parts of Essex, Passaic, Somerset, and Sussex
Rodney Frelinghuysen (Morristown)	Republican	January 3, 1995 – January 3, 2019	104th 105th 106th 107th 108th 109th 110th 111th 112th 113th 114th 115th	Elected in 1994. Re-elected in 1996. Re-elected in 1998. Re-elected in 2000. Re-elected in 2002. Re-elected in 2004. Re-elected in 2006. Re-elected in 2008. Re-elected in 2010. Re-elected in 2012. Re-elected in 2014. Re-elected in 2016. Retired.	2013–2023: Parts of Essex, Morris, Passaic, and Sussex
Mikie Sherrill (Montclair)	Democratic	January 3, 2019 – November 20, 2025	116th 117th 118th 119th	Elected in 2018. Re-elected in 2020. Re-elected in 2022. Re-elected in 2024. Resigned after being elected governor of New Jersey.	2013–2023: Parts of Essex, Morris, Passaic, and Sussex
Mikie Sherrill (Montclair)	Democratic	January 3, 2019 – November 20, 2025	116th 117th 118th 119th	Elected in 2018. Re-elected in 2020. Re-elected in 2022. Re-elected in 2024. Resigned after being elected governor of New Jersey.	2023–present: Parts of Essex, Morris, and Passaic
Vacant		November 21, 2025 – April 20, 2026	119th		2023–present: Parts of Essex, Morris, and Passaic
Analilia Mejia (Glen Ridge)	Democratic	April 20, 2026 – present	119th	Elected to finish Sherrill's term. Re-elected 2026.	2023–present: Parts of Essex, Morris, and Passaic
