= Edward L. O'Neill =

American businessman and politician

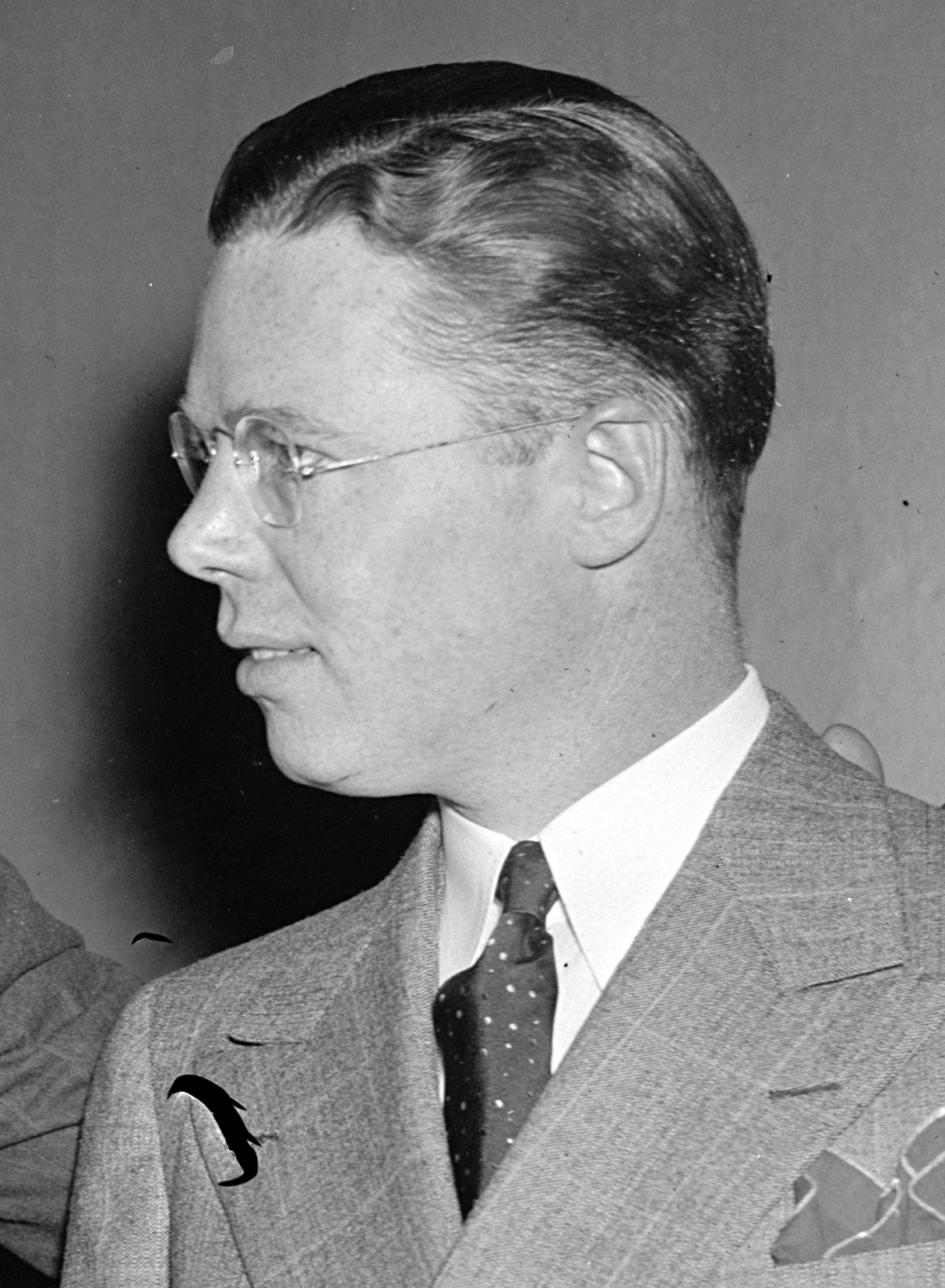
- O'Neill in April 1937.

Member of the U.S. House of Representatives from New Jersey's 11th district
- In office January 3, 1937 – January 3, 1939
- Preceded by: Peter Angelo Cavicchia
- Succeeded by: Albert L. Vreeland

Personal details
- Born: July 10, 1903 Newark, New Jersey, U.S.
- Died: December 12, 1948 (aged 45) Newark, New Jersey, U.S.
- Party: Democratic

Edward Leo O'Neill (July 10, 1903 – December 12, 1948) was an American businessman and Democratic Party politician who represented New Jersey's 11th congressional district for one term from 1937-1939.

== Early life and education ==
O'Neill was born in Newark, New Jersey on July 10, 1903, where he attended the local parochial schools. He served in the United States Navy from 1919 to 1923, after which he became engaged in the real estate business in Newark.

== Congress ==
He was an unsuccessful candidate for election in 1934 to the Seventy-fourth Congress, and was elected as a Democrat to the Seventy-fifth Congress, serving in office for a single term from January 3, 1937 – January 3, 1939. O'Neill was an unsuccessful candidate for reelection in 1938 to the Seventy-sixth Congress.

== Later life ==
After his departure from Congress, he served as a lieutenant in the United States Naval Reserve in 1939 and 1940, and served as a captain in the United States Army Quartermaster Corps in 1942 and 1943. He was commissioner of the Essex County Board of Taxation 1940-1945. He was a realtor and mortgage broker in Newark until his death on December 12, 1948. He was interred in Holy Sepulchre Cemetery in East Orange, New Jersey.

U.S. House of Representatives
Preceded by Peter A. Cavicchia	Member of the U.S. House of Representatives from New Jersey's 11th congressional district January 3, 1937 – January 3, 1939	Succeeded by Albert L. Vreeland
