= Edward A. Kenney =

American politician (1884–1938)

Edward Aloysius Kenney
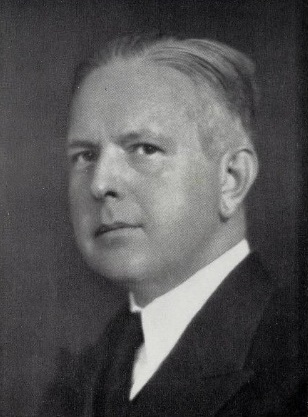
- Frontispiece of 1938's Edward Aloysius Kenney, Late a Representative

Member of the U.S. House of Representatives from New Jersey's 9th district
- In office March 4, 1933 – January 27, 1938
- Preceded by: Peter Angelo Cavicchia
- Succeeded by: Frank C. Osmers Jr.

Personal details
- Born: August 11, 1884 Clinton, Massachusetts, US
- Died: January 27, 1938 (aged 53) Washington, D.C., US
- Party: Democratic

Edward Aloysius Kenney (August 11, 1884 – January 27, 1938) was elected to three terms in the United States House of Representatives from New Jersey, serving from 1933 until 1938. He died in office following an accidental fall from a window.

== Early life and education ==
Kenney was born on August 11, 1884, in Clinton, Massachusetts, and attended the public schools. He graduated from Clinton High School in 1902. He then graduated from Williams College in 1906, and from the law department of New York University in New York City in 1908.

He was admitted to the New York State Bar Association in 1908 and commenced practice in New York City. He moved to Cliffside Park, New Jersey, in 1916 and continued the practice of law.

== Political career ==
During the First World War he served as a member of the legal advisory draft board of New Jersey in 1917.

He was judge of recorders court in Cliffside Park, New Jersey, from 1919 to 1923.

He was an unsuccessful candidate for Mayor of Cliffside Park, New Jersey as an Independent in 1921, as a Republican in 1923, and as a Democrat in 1927.

He became chairman of the Cliffside Park Housing Commission in 1922 and 1923 and was a member of the Republican county committee in 1925 and 1926.

=== Congress ===
Kenney was elected as a Democrat to the Seventy-third, Seventy-fourth, and Seventy-fifth Congresses and served from March 4, 1933, until his death in Washington, D.C., due to an accidental fall from a window of the Carleton Arms Hotel on January 27, 1938.

He is buried in St. John's Cemetery, Clinton, Massachusetts.

== See also ==
- List of members of the United States Congress who died in office (1900–1949)

U.S. House of Representatives
Preceded by Peter A. Caviccia	Member of the U.S. House of Representatives from New Jersey's 9th congressional district March 4, 1933 – January 27, 1938	Succeeded by Frank C. Osmers, Jr.
