= Peter A. Cavicchia =

American politician (1879–1967)

Peter Angelo Cavicchia
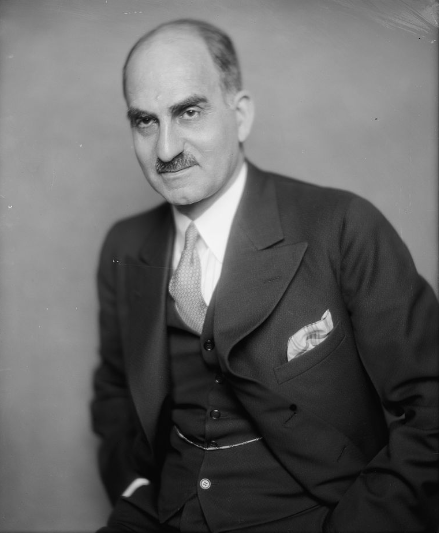

Member of the U.S. House of Representatives from New Jersey
- In office March 4, 1931 – January 3, 1937
- Preceded by: Franklin William Fort
- Succeeded by: Edward L. O'Neill
- Constituency: 9th district (1931–33); 11th district (1933–37)

Personal details
- Born: May 22, 1879 Roccamandolfi, Province of Campobasso, Italy
- Died: September 11, 1967 (aged 88) Belleville, New Jersey, U.S.
- Party: Republican

Peter Angelo Cavicchia (May 22, 1879 – September 11, 1967) was an American Republican Party politician from New Jersey, who served in the United States House of Representatives, where he represented Essex County, including The Oranges and parts of Newark.

== Biography ==
Peter Angelo Cavicchia immigrated from Italy to the United States in 1888 with his parents, settling in Newark, New Jersey. He attended and graduated from New Jersey's public school system, later graduating from the American International College in 1906 and from New York University School of Law in 1908. He was admitted to the bar in 1909 and began practicing in Newark. He also served as director and counsel for several building and loan associations and was appointed supervisor of inheritance tax of Essex County in 1917. He was a member of the Board of Education of the Newark Public Schools from 1917–1931, serving as its president from 1924-1926.

Cavicchia was professor of law and trustee of Mercer Beasley School of Law (now part of Rutgers University) in Newark from 1925-1931. He was elected as a Republican to the Seventy-second, Seventy-third, and Seventy-fourth Congresses (serving from March 4, 1931 – January 3, 1937). His bid for reelection in 1936 to the Seventy-fifth Congress was unsuccessful. He then resumed the practice of law and resumed serving as supervisor of inheritance tax for Essex County, 1937-1956. He also served as chairman of Central Planning Board of Newark, 1946-1957.

Cavicchia died in Belleville, New Jersey, September 11, 1967, aged 88. He is interred in Fairmount Cemetery in Newark.

U.S. House of Representatives
| Preceded by Franklin W. Fort | Member of the U.S. House of Representatives from New Jersey's 9th congressional district March 4, 1931 – March 3, 1933 | Succeeded by Edward A. Kenney |
| Preceded by Oscar L. Auf der Heide | Member of the U.S. House of Representatives from New Jersey's 11th congressional district March 4, 1933 – January 3, 1937 | Succeeded by Edward L. O'Neill |
