= Hugh J. Addonizio =

American politician (1914–1981)

Hugh Joseph Addonizio
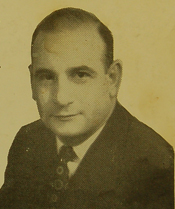

35th Mayor of Newark
- In office July 1, 1962 – July 1, 1970
- Preceded by: Leo P. Carlin
- Succeeded by: Kenneth A. Gibson

Member of the U.S. House of Representatives from New Jersey's 11th district
- In office January 3, 1949 – June 30, 1962
- Preceded by: Frank Sundstrom
- Succeeded by: Joseph Minish

Personal details
- Born: January 31, 1914 Newark, New Jersey, U.S.
- Died: February 2, 1981 (aged 67) Red Bank, New Jersey, U.S.
- Party: Democratic
- Education: Fordham University

Military service
- Allegiance: United States
- Branch/service: United States Army
- Rank: Captain
- Battles/wars: World War II
- Awards: Silver Star

Hugh Joseph Addonizio (January 31, 1914 – February 2, 1981) was an American Democratic Party politician who was sentenced to prison for corruption. He was the 33rd mayor of Newark, New Jersey, from 1962 to 1970, and a U.S. Congressman from 1949 to 1962.

== Early life and education ==
Born in Newark to an Italian family, Addonizio attended West Side High School and played quarterback at Saint Benedict's Preparatory School. Addonizio graduated from Fordham University in New York City in 1939, attending with an athletic scholarship, and went to work for A&C Clothing Company, working for his father, where he became vice president in 1946.

== World War II ==
During World War II he had served in the United States Army earning the Silver Star; he served in North Africa, Italy and France. Addonizio was among the first Americans drafted in 1940, a year before Pearl Harbor. He rose from the rank of private, was discharged with the rank of captain, and was named to the Officer Candidate School Hall of Fame at Fort Benning.

== Political career ==
In 1948, he ran for and won a seat in the United States House of Representatives as a Democrat, representing New Jersey's 11th congressional district. He resigned his seat on June 30, 1962, to run for mayor of Newark. He ran on a reform platform, defeating what he characterized as the corrupt political machine of Leo P. Carlin, who had been mayor since 1953.

=== Corruption investigation ===
Addonizio served as mayor from 1962 until 1970, when he lost his reelection bid. A state investigation into his administration commenced following the 1967 Newark riots that occurred during his tenure, which led to the discovery that he and other city officials were taking kickbacks from city contractors. In December 1969, he and nine current or former officials of the municipal administration in Newark were indicted by a federal grand jury; five other persons were also indicted.

In July 1970, the former mayor and four other defendants were found guilty by a federal jury on 64 counts each, one of conspiracy and 63 of extortion. In September 1970, Addonizio was sentenced to ten years in federal prison and fined $25,000 by U.S. District Court Judge George H. Barlow for his role in a plot that involved the extortion of $1.5 million in kickbacks, a crime that the judge said "tore at the very heart of our civilized society and our form of representative government".

Addonizio served around half of his ten-year sentence before being released on parole.

== Death ==
Addonizio died of cardiac arrest in 1981 and was interred in Gate of Heaven Cemetery in East Hanover.

== See also ==
- List of mayors of Newark, New Jersey

U.S. House of Representatives
Preceded by Frank Sundstrom	Member of the U.S. House of Representatives from New Jersey's 11th congressional district 1949–1962	Succeeded by Joseph Minish
Political offices
Preceded by Leo P. Carlin	Mayor of Newark; 1962–1970	Succeeded by Kenneth A. Gibson
