= Frank Sundstrom =

American politician (1901–1980)

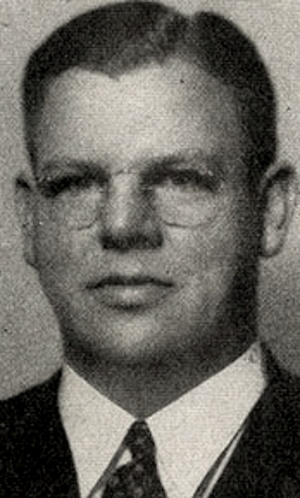

Member of the U.S. House of Representatives from New Jersey's 11th district
- In office January 3, 1943 – January 3, 1949
- Preceded by: Albert L. Vreeland
- Succeeded by: Hugh Joseph Addonizio

Personal details
- Born: Frank Leander Sundstrom; January 5, 1901 Massena, New York, US
- Died: May 23, 1980 (aged 79) Summit, New Jersey, US
- Resting place: Restland Memorial Park in East Hanover, New Jersey
- Party: Republican

Frank Leander Sundstrom (January 5, 1901 – May 23, 1980) was an American Republican Party politician who represented New Jersey's 11th congressional district for three terms from 1943 to 1949.

== Early life and education ==
Born in Massena, New York on January 5, 1901, to a Swedish immigrant father, Sundstrom attended the public schools.

== Early career ==
He was a newspaper reporter and editor from 1918 to 1920 before attending Cornell University. While a tackle for the Cornell football team, they were undefeated in 24 games over three seasons. Sundstrom graduated in 1924. During his senior year, Sundstrom was elected to the Sphinx Head Society. He went on serve as assistant coach for the Indiana University (Bloomington) football team for one season in 1924. Sundstrom was inducted into the College Football Hall of Fame in 1978.

Sundstrom engaged in the banking and brokerage business in New York City from 1925 to 1969 and became chairman of the East Orange, New Jersey Republican Committee (1940–1946).

== Congress ==
He was elected as a Republican to the Seventy-eighth, Seventy-ninth and Eightieth Congresses, serving in office from January 3, 1943, to January 3, 1949. He was an unsuccessful candidate for reelection in 1948 to the Eighty-first Congress.

== Later career and death ==
After his term in Congress, he was vice president and director of Schenley Distillers (1954–1969); vice president and director of public relations for Schenley Industries, Inc. (1955–1969); vice president of the Tobacco Institute (1969–1976); and a consultant for a group of United States distillers (1976–1980).

Sundstrom resided in Chatham Borough, New Jersey, until his death in Summit, New Jersey on May 23, 1980. He was interred in Restland Memorial Park in East Hanover, New Jersey.

== Sources ==
- United States Congress. "Frank Sundstrom (id: S001076)". Biographical Directory of the United States Congress.
- Frank "Sunny" Sundstrom at the College Football Hall of Fame

U.S. House of Representatives
Preceded by Albert L. Vreeland	Member of the U.S. House of Representatives from New Jersey's 11th congressional district January 3, 1943 – January 3, 1949	Succeeded by Hugh Joseph Addonizio
