= Albert L. Vreeland =

American politician (1901–1975)

Member of the U.S. House of Representatives from New Jersey's 11th district
- In office January 3, 1939 – January 3, 1943
- Preceded by: Edward L. O'Neill
- Succeeded by: Frank Sundstrom

Personal details
- Born: July 2, 1901 East Orange, New Jersey, U.S.
- Died: May 3, 1975 (aged 73) Orange, New Jersey, U.S.
- Party: Republican

Albert Lincoln Vreeland (July 2, 1901 – May 3, 1975) was an American Republican Party politician who represented New Jersey's 11th congressional district from 1939 to 1943.

== Biography ==
He was born in East Orange, New Jersey. He attended the public schools and was employed as an ambulance driver for the American Red Cross in 1918 and 1919. Later, he graduated from the New York Electrical School in New York City in 1919, the Peddie School, Hightstown, New Jersey in 1922, and the New Jersey Law School at Newark, New Jersey (now Rutgers School of Law–Newark) in 1925.

Vreeland was admitted to the bar in 1927 and commenced practice in East Orange, New Jersey. He served as the assistant city counsel and city prosecutor of East Orange 1929-1934 and the judge of the recorder's court of East Orange 1934–1938. He was elected as a Republican to the Seventy-sixth and Seventy-seventh Congresses, serving in office from January 3, 1939, to January 3, 1943.

Vreeland was a captain in the United States Army Reserve and on December 9, 1941, was granted leave of absence from the United States House of Representatives to go on active duty to serve in World War II. He was assigned to the Military Intelligence Section of the War Department. He was transferred to the Seventy-sixth Infantry Division in April 1942 and commissioned a major in Infantry on July 17, 1942. On July 18, 1942, by Presidential directive, was ordered back to the House of Representatives. He was not a candidate for renomination in 1942 to the 78th United States Congress. After leaving Congress, he reentered the Army on January 4, 1943, and served two years in Australia and New Guinea. He was commissioned a lieutenant colonel on August 27, 1944, and ordered to inactive duty August 27, 1945, as a colonel, A.I., USAR (retired).

After the war, he was the police commissioner of East Orange, New Jersey 1945–1951. He was also the public relations officer for the Celanese Corporation of America from 1945 to 1946. He resumed the practice of law and died in Orange, New Jersey in 1975. He was buried in Glendale Cemetery, Bloomfield, New Jersey.

U.S. House of Representatives
Preceded by Edward L. O'Neill	Member of the U.S. House of Representatives from New Jersey's 11th congressional district January 3, 1939 – January 3, 1943	Succeeded by Frank Sundstrom
