= Franklin W. Fort =

American politician (1880-1937)

Franklin William Fort
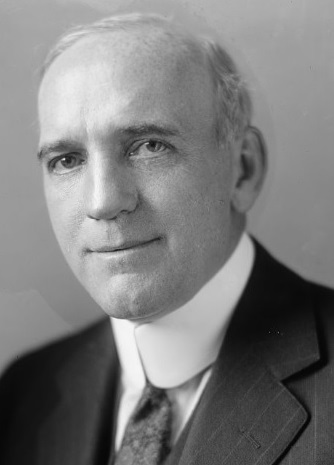
- Harris & Ewing Collection, Library of Congress

Member of the U.S. House of Representatives from New Jersey's 9th district
- In office March 4, 1925 – March 3, 1931
- Preceded by: Daniel F. Minahan
- Succeeded by: Peter Angelo Cavicchia

Personal details
- Born: March 30, 1880 Newark, New Jersey, U.S.
- Died: June 20, 1937 (aged 57) Rochester, Minnesota, U.S.
- Party: Republican
- Parents: John Franklin Fort (father); Charlotte Stainsby (mother)
- Relatives: George Franklin Fort (great-uncle)
- Education: Newark Academy; Lawrenceville School
- Alma mater: Princeton University; New York Law School

Franklin William Fort (March 30, 1880 – June 20, 1937) was an American lawyer and politician who served as a U.S. representative from New Jersey for three terms from 1925 to 1931. He was the son of New Jersey governor John Franklin Fort.

== Early life and education ==
Franklin W. Fort was born on March 30, 1880, in Newark, New Jersey, to John Franklin Fort and Charlotte Stainsby.

In 1888, he moved with his parents to East Orange, New Jersey. He attended the public schools and Newark Academy and graduated from Lawrenceville School in 1897 and from Princeton University in 1901. He attended New York Law School from 1901 to 1903 and was admitted to the bar in 1903 and commenced practice in Newark. He served as recorder of East Orange, New Jersey, in 1907 and 1908.

During World War I he served as a volunteer on the staff of the United States Food Administrator, Washington, D.C., from 1917 to 1919.

He engaged in the insurance business in 1919 at Newark, New Jersey, and was also interested in banking.

== Congress ==
Fort was elected as a Republican to the Sixty-ninth, Seventieth, and Seventy-first Congresses (March 4, 1925 – March 3, 1931). He was not a candidate for renomination, but was an unsuccessful candidate for nomination as United States Senator in 1930.

He served as secretary of the Republican National Committee 1928-1930.

== After Congress ==
He resumed the practice of law. He served as chairman of the Federal Home Loan Bank Board from January 1932 to March 1933.

== Death ==
He died on June 20, 1937, in Rochester, Minnesota. He was interred in Bloomfield Cemetery in Bloomfield, New Jersey.

U.S. House of Representatives
Preceded by Daniel F. Minahan	Member of the U.S. House of Representatives from New Jersey's 9th congressional district March 4, 1925 – March 3, 1931	Succeeded by Peter A. Caviccia
