= 1798 United States House of Representatives elections in New Jersey =

United States House of Representatives elections in New Jersey, 1798
- October 10, 1798

All 5 New Jersey seats to the United States House of Representatives
	Majority party	Minority party
Party	Democratic-Republican	Federalist
Last election	0	5
Seats won	3	2
Seat change	▲3	▼3
Popular vote	10,035	9,132
Percentage	52.4%	47.6%
Democratic-Republican
40–50%
50–60%
70–80%
Federalist
50–60%
70–80%

Elections to the United States House of Representatives in New Jersey for the 6th Congress were held October 10, 1798.

== Background ==
All previous elections had been held on an at-large basis. Five Federalists had been elected in the previous election. For this election, New Jersey switched, for the first time, to using districts.

== Election results ==
Three incumbents ran for re-election, of whom, two of whom lost to Democratic-Republicans. The incumbents Jonathan Dayton (F) and Thomas Sinnickson (F) did not run for re-election. In the districts with no incumbents, one was won by a Democratic-Republican and the other by a Federalist, for a net gain of 3 seats by the Democratic-Republicans

1798 United States House election results
District	Democratic-Republican			Federalist		
Eastern	John Condit	3,378	52.5%	James Schureman (I)	3,054	47.5%
Northern	Aaron Kitchell	3,399	72.5%	Mark Thomson (I)	1,287	27.5%
Western	James Linn	1,613	51.3%	Samuel R. Stewart	979	31.1%
Western				Archibald Mercer	554	17.6%
Middle	Thomas Henderson	379	19.0%	James H. Imlay (I)	1,614	81.0%
Southern	Jonathan Elmer	1,266	43.5%	Franklin Davenport	1,644	56.5%

== See also ==
- United States House of Representatives elections, 1798
