= 1996 United States House of Representatives elections in New Jersey =

- November 5, 1996

All 13 New Jersey seats to the United States House of Representatives
- Turnout: 72% (▲17pp)
	Majority party	Minority party
Party	Republican	Democratic
Last election	8	5
Seats won	7	6
Seat change	▼1	▲1
Popular vote	1,398,888	1,351,774
Percentage	49.6%	47.9%
Swing	▼4.87pp	▲4.00pp

Republican
40–50%
50–60%
60–70%
70–80%
Democratic
40–50%
50–60%
60–70%
70–80%
80–90%

The 1996 United States House of Representatives elections in New Jersey were held on November 5, 1996, to determine who would represent the people of New Jersey in the United States House of Representatives. This election coincided with national elections for President of the United States, U.S. House and U.S. Senate. New Jersey had thirteen seats in the House, apportioned according to the 1990 United States census. Representatives are elected for two-year terms.

This is the last time Republicans won a majority of seats from New Jersey, and Republicans have only won the popular vote once since in the state, in 2010.

== Overview ==
1996 United States House of Representatives elections in New Jersey
Party	Votes	Percentage	Candidates	Seats	+/–
Republican	1,398,900	49.55%	13	7	▼1
Democratic	1,351,762	47.88%	13	6	▲1
Independents	72,497	2.57%	40	0	Steady
Totals	2,823,159	100.00%	66	13	—

== District 1 ==
1996 New Jersey's 1st congressional district election
- November 5, 1996
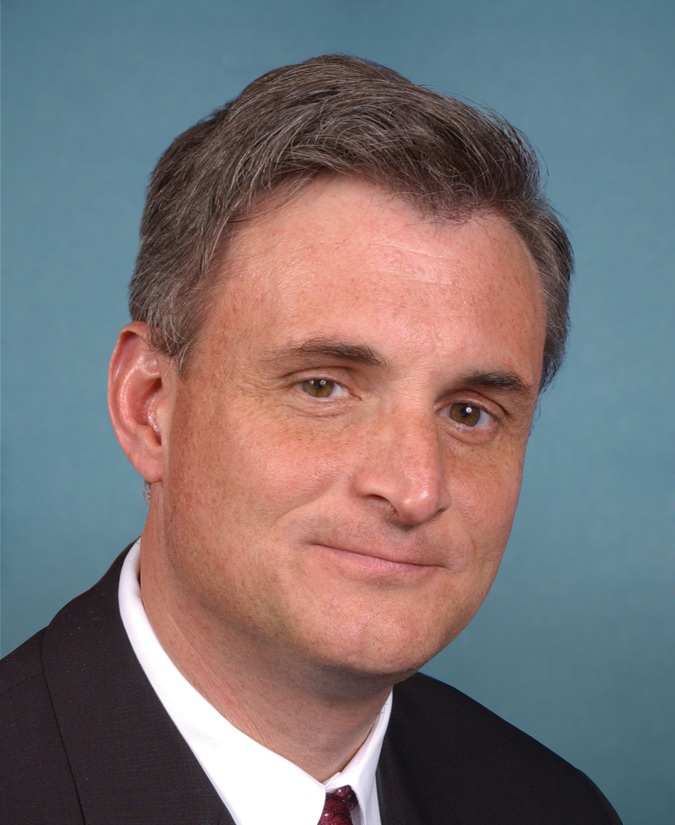

Nominee	Rob Andrews	Mel Suplee
Party	Democratic	Republican
Popular vote	160,415	44,286
Percentage	76.1%	21.0%
U.S. Representative before election
Rob Andrews
Democratic
Elected U.S. Representative
Rob Andrews
Democratic

Incumbent Democrat Rob Andrews won. The district included parts of Burlington, Camden, and Gloucester counties.

=== Democratic primary ===
==== Candidates ====
- Rob Andrews, incumbent Representative from Haddon Heights since 1990

==== Results ====
1996 Democratic primary
Party	Candidate	Votes	%
Democratic	Rob Andrews (incumbent)	22,414	100.00%
Total votes		22,414	100.00%

=== Republican primary ===
==== Candidates ====
- William Henry Harris
- Sophia A. Nelson

==== Results ====
1996 Republican primary
Party	Candidate	Votes	%
Republican	Sophia A. Nelson	7,967	77.70%
Republican	William Henry Harris	2,286	22.30%
Total votes		10,253	100.00%

After the primary election, Nelson resigned from the race for personal reasons and was replaced as Republican nominee by Mel Suplee.

=== General election ===
==== Candidates ====
- Rob Andrews, incumbent Representative from Haddon Heights since 1990 (Democratic)
- Patricia Bily (Independent)
- Michael Edmondson (Independent)
- Mel Suplee, university contract specialist and candidate for mayor of Bellmawr in 1994 and state senate in 1995 (Republican)
- Norman E. Wahner (Independent)

==== Campaign ====
Suplee accused Andrews of alienating his fellow Democratic caucus members in Congress, endangering his ability to form coalitions to pass legislation, and called for term limits, a balanced budget, and reduced immigration.

==== Results ====
1996 U.S. House election
Party	Candidate	Votes	%	±%
Democratic	Rob Andrews (incumbent)	160,415	76.12%	▲3.85
Republican	Mel Suplee	44,286	21.02%	▼6.71
Independent	Michael Edmondson	2,668	1.27%	N/A
Independent	Patricia A. Bily	1,873	0.89%	N/A
Independent	Norman E. Wahner	1,493	0.71%	N/A
Total votes		210,735	100.00%	
Democratic hold		Swing	{{{swing}}}	

== District 2 ==
1994 New Jersey's 2nd congressional district election
- November 5, 1996
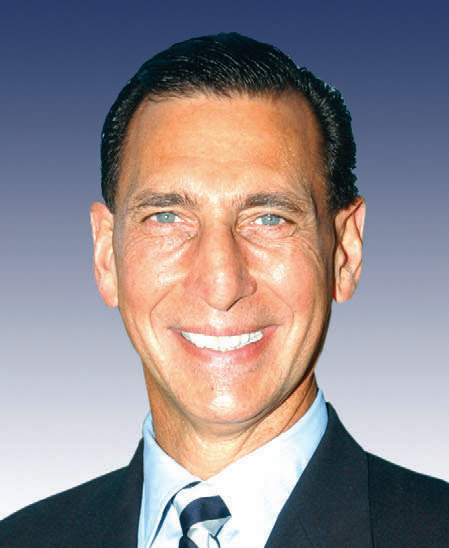

Nominee	Frank LoBiondo	Ruth Katz
Party	Republican	Democratic
Popular vote	133,130	83,912
Percentage	60.3%	38.0%
U.S. Representative before election
Frank LoBiondo
Republican
Elected U.S. Representative
Frank LoBiondo
Republican

Incumbent Republican Frank A. LoBiondo won. This district, the largest in South Jersey, included all of Atlantic, Cape May, Cumberland, and Salem counties and parts of Burlington and Gloucester counties.

=== Republican primary ===
==== Candidates ====
- Frank LoBiondo, incumbent Representative since 1995

==== Results ====
1996 Republican primary
Party	Candidate	Votes	%
Republican	Frank LoBiondo (incumbent)	22,385	100.00%
Total votes		22,385	100.00%

=== Democratic primary ===
==== Candidates ====
- Ruth Katz, public health program director and candidate for this district in 1994

==== Results ====
1996 Democratic primary
Party	Candidate	Votes	%
Democratic	Ruth Katz	12,200	100.00%
Total votes		12,200	100.00%

=== General election ===
==== Candidates ====
- Judith Lee Azaren (Independent)
- David Rodger Headrick (Independent)
- Ruth Katz, public health program director and candidate for this district in 1994 (Democratic)
- Frank LoBiondo, incumbent Representative since 1995 (Republican)
- Andrea Lippi (Independent)

==== Campaign ====
Katz, a moderate who supported welfare reform requiring recipients to work and maintaining current funding levels for Head Start and higher education loans, was expected to give the one-term incumbent LoBiondo a serious challenge. She criticized LoBiondo and the Republican Congress for cutting back on environmental regulations.

==== Results ====
1996 U.S. House election
Party	Candidate	Votes	%	±%
Republican	Frank LoBiondo (incumbent)	133,130	60.31%	▼4.31
Democratic	Ruth Katz	83,912	38.01%	▲2.63
Independent	David Rodger Headrick	1,429	0.65%	N/A
Independent	Judith Lee Azaren	1,174	0.53%	N/A
Independent	Andrea Lippi	1,084	0.49%	N/A
Total votes		220,739	100.00%	
Republican hold		Swing	{{{swing}}}	

== District 3 ==
1996 New Jersey's 3rd congressional district election
- November 5, 1996
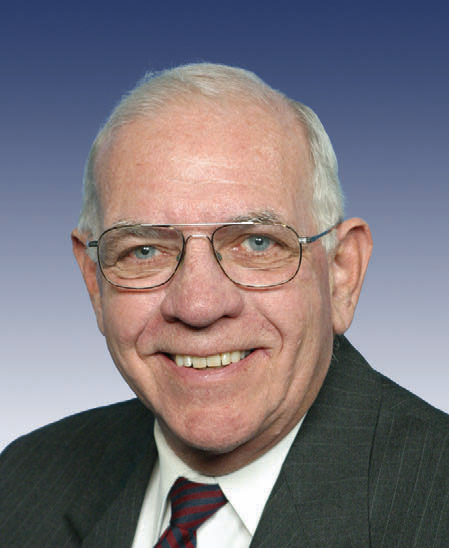

Nominee	Jim Saxton	John Leonardi
Party	Republican	Democratic
Popular vote	157,503	81,590
Percentage	64.2%	33.3%
U.S. Representative before election
Jim Saxton
Republican
Elected U.S. Representative
Jim Saxton
Republican

Incumbent Republican Jim Saxton won. This district included parts of Burlington, Camden, and Ocean counties.

=== Republican primary ===
==== Candidates ====
- Jim Saxton, incumbent Representative from Mount Holly since 1984

==== Results ====
1996 Republican primary
Party	Candidate	Votes	%
Republican	Jim Saxton (incumbent)	18,949	100.00%
Total votes		18,949	100.00%

=== Democratic primary ===
==== Candidates ====
- John Leonardi, Cherry Hill businessman

==== Results ====
1996 Democratic primary
Party	Candidate	Votes	%
Democratic	John Leonardi	13,189	100.00%
Total votes		13,189	100.00%

=== General election ===
==== Candidates ====
- Eugene B. Ashworth (Independent)
- Ken Feduniewicz (Independent)
- Agnes A. James (Independent)
- John Leonardi, Cherry Hill businessman (Democratic)
- Janice Presser (Independent)
- Jim Saxton, incumbent Representative from Mount Holly since 1984 (Republican)

==== Campaign ====
Leonardi focused his campaign on preserving Medicare by reducing benefits for the wealthy and balancing the federal budget. He proposed lowering the deficit by repealing tax cuts and cutting defense spending. Saxton was regarded as a formidable incumbent for his moderate stances on gun control and environmental protection, including preventing his party from weakening of the Clean Water Act, as well as his strong fundraising.

==== Results ====
1996 U.S. House election
Party	Candidate	Votes	%	
Republican	Jim Saxton (incumbent)	157,503	64.21%	▼2.19
Democratic	John Leonardi	81,590	33.26%	▲2.03
Independent	Janice Presser	3,037	1.24%	N/A
Independent	Agnes A. James	1,355	0.55%	N/A
Independent	Eugene B. Ashworth	1,134	0.46%	N/A
Independent	Ken Feduniewicz	659	0.27%	
Total votes		245,278	100.00%	
Republican hold		Swing	{{{swing}}}	

== District 4 ==
1994 New Jersey's 4th congressional district election
- November 5, 1996
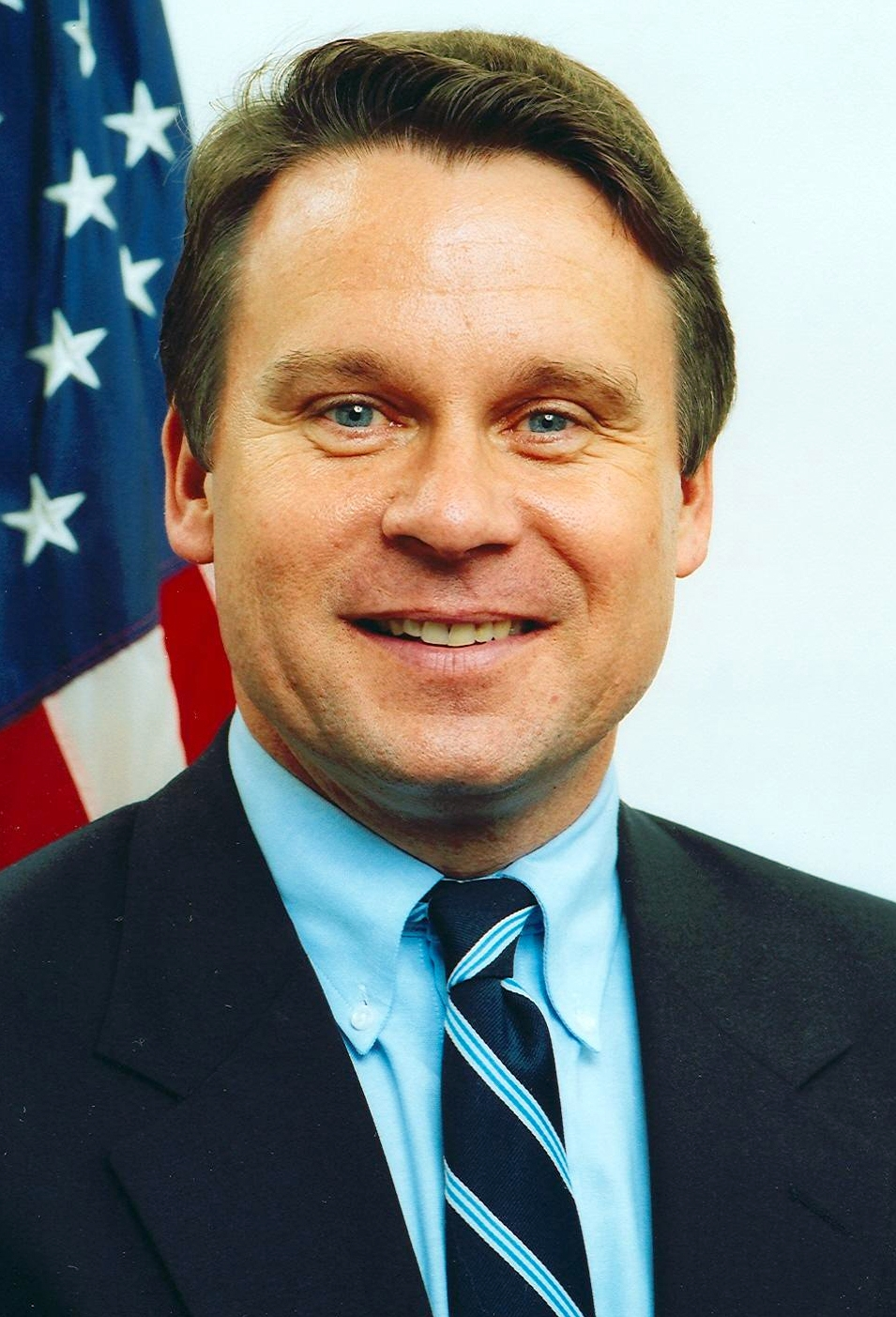

Nominee	Chris Smith	Kevin Meara
Party	Republican	Democratic
Popular vote	146,404	77,565
Percentage	63.6%	33.7%
U.S. Representative before election
Chris Smith
Republican
Elected U.S. Representative
Chris Smith
Republican

Incumbent Republican Chris Smith won. This district, in Central Jersey, consisted of parts of Burlington, Mercer, Monmouth and Ocean counties.

=== Republican primary ===
==== Candidates ====
- Chris Smith, incumbent Representative since 1981

==== Results ====
1996 Republican primary
Party	Candidate	Votes	%
Republican	Chris Smith (incumbent)	17,080	100.00%
Total votes		17,080	100.00%

=== Democratic primary ===
==== Candidates ====
- Kevin John Meara, former member of the Hamilton Township Council

==== Results ====
1996 Democratic primary
Party	Candidate	Votes	%
Democratic	Kevin John Meara	14,217	100.00%
Total votes		14,217	100.00%

=== General election ===
==== Candidates ====
- Robert Figueroa (Independent)
- Arnold Kokans (Independent)
- Kevin John Meara, former member of the Hamilton Township Council (Democratic)
- Chris Smith, incumbent Representative since 1981 (Republican)
- J. Morgan Strong (Independent)

==== Candidate ====
Meara matched the incumbent on a number of issues, including opposing abortion, favoring work requirements for welfare, and favoring stronger immigration restrictions. He opposed the North American Free Trade Agreement and supporter the "Don't ask, don't tell" policy.

==== Results ====
1996 U.S. House election
Party	Candidate	Votes	%	±%
Republican	Chris Smith (incumbent)	146,404	63.62%	▼4.27
Democratic	Kevin John Meara	77,565	33.71%	▲3.09
Independent	Robert Figueroa	3,000	1.30%	N/A
Independent	J. Morgan Strong	2,034	0.88%	N/A
Independent	Arnold Kokans	1,111	0.48%	▼0.03
Total votes		230,114	100.00%	
Republican hold		Swing	{{{swing}}}	

== District 5 ==
1996 New Jersey's 5th congressional district election
- November 5, 1996
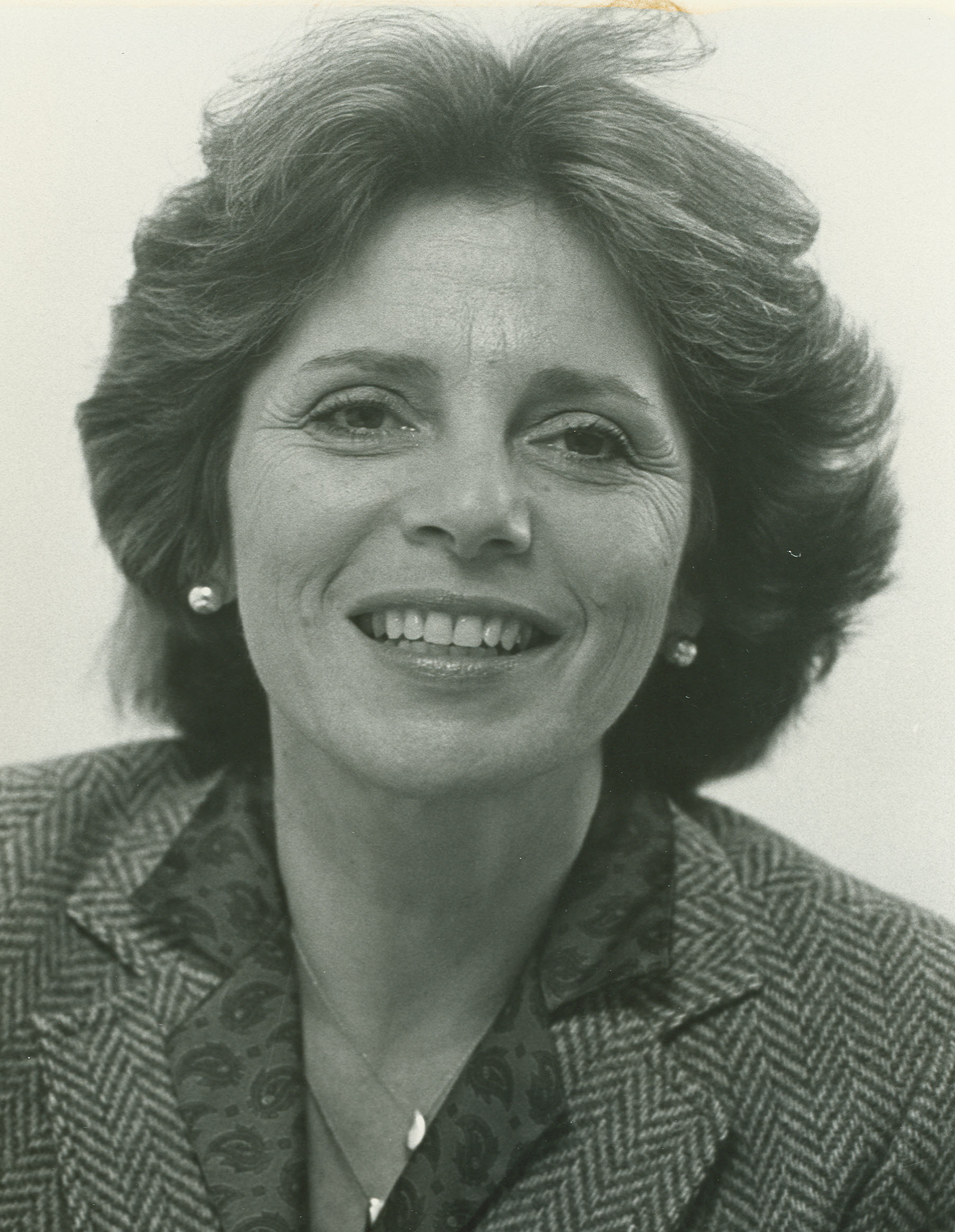

Nominee	Marge Roukema	Bill Auer
Party	Republican	Democratic
Popular vote	181,323	62,956
Percentage	71.3%	24.8%
U.S. Representative before election
Marge Roukema
Republican
Elected U.S. Representative
Marge Roukema
Republican

Incumbent Marge Roukema won. This district included parts of Bergen, Passaic, and Sussex counties and all of Warren County.

=== Republican primary ===
==== Candidates ====
- Roger Bacon, Libertarian nominee for this district in 1994
- George Matreyek
- Marge Roukema, incumbent Representative from Ridgewood since 1981

==== Results ====
1996 Republican primary
Party	Candidate	Votes	%
Republican	Marge Roukema (incumbent)	20,682	74.99%
Republican	George Matreyek	5,076	18.41%
Republican	Roger Bacon	1,820	6.60%
Total votes		27,578	100.00%

=== Democratic primary ===
==== Candidates ====
- Bill Auer, Allendale advertising businessman and nominee for this district in 1994

==== Results ====
1996 Democratic primary
Party	Candidate	Votes	%
Democratic	Bill Auer	8,227	100.00%
Total votes		8,227	100.00%

=== General election ===
==== Candidates ====
- Bill Auer, Allendale advertising businessman and nominee for this district in 1994 (Democratic)
- Barry Childers (Independent)
- Helen Hamilton, Natural Law Party nominee for this district in 1994 (Independent)
- Dan Karlan (Independent)
- E. Gregory Kresge (Independent)
- Lorraine L. La Neve, Republican candidate for this district in 1994 (Independent)
- Marge Roukema, incumbent Representative from Ridgewood since 1981 (Republican)

==== Campaign ====
Running his second consecutive campaign, Bill Auer supported universal healthcare, reductions in defense spending, and permitting gay servicemembers in the military.

==== Results ====
1996 U.S. House election
Party	Candidate	Votes	%	±%
Republican	Marge Roukema (incumbent)	181,323	71.29%	▼2.96
Democratic	Bill Auer	62,956	24.75%	▲2.65
Independent	Lorraine L. La Neve	4,093	1.61%	N/A
Independent	Dan Karlan	2,118	0.83%	N/A
Independent	Helen Hamilton	1,678	0.66%	▲0.32
Independent	Barry Childers	1,266	0.50%	N/A
Independent	E. Gregory Kresge	899	0.35%	N/A
Total votes		254,333	100.00%	
Republican hold		Swing	{{{swing}}}	

== District 6 ==
1996 New Jersey's 6th congressional district election
- November 5, 1996
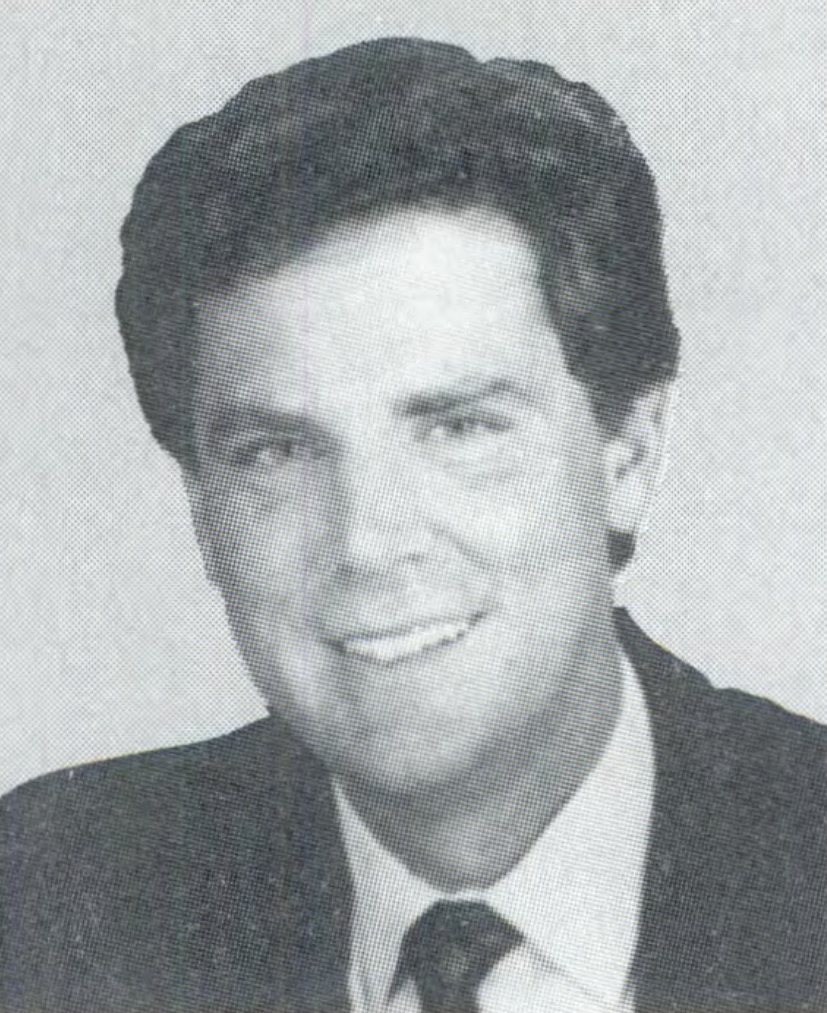

Nominee	Frank Pallone	Steve Corodemus
Party	Democratic	Republican
Popular vote	124,635	73,402
Percentage	61.3%	36.1%
U.S. Representative before election
Frank Pallone
Democratic
Elected U.S. Representative
Frank Pallone
Democratic

Incumbent Democrat Frank Pallone won. This district included parts of Middlesex and Monmouth counties.

=== Democratic primary ===
==== Candidates ====
- Frank Pallone, incumbent Representative from Long Branch since 1988

==== Results ====
1996 Democratic primary
Party	Candidate	Votes	%
Democratic	Frank Pallone (incumbent)	24,475	100.00%
Total votes		24,475	

=== Republican primary ===
==== Candidates ====
- Steve Corodemus, assemblyman from Atlantic Highlands
- Karen Anne Zaletel

==== Results ====
1996 Republican primary
Party	Candidate	Votes	%
Republican	Steve Corodemus	7,106	89.63%
Republican	Karen Anne Zaletel	822	10.37%
Total votes		7,928	100.00%

=== General election ===
==== Candidates ====
- Steve Corodemus, assemblyman from Atlantic Highlands (Republican)
- Susan H. Normandin (Independent)
- Frank Pallone, incumbent Representative from Long Branch since 1988 (Democratic)
- Keith Quarles (Independent)
- Richard Sorrentino (Independent)
- Stepfanie C. Trice (Independent)

==== Campaign ====
Pallone, considered a relative moderate, had opposed the NAFTA and GATT free trade initiatives but was one of the few Democrats outside of the South to support the tax cut provisions of the Contract with America. Corodemus criticized him for failing to write or sponsor enough legislation during his four terms in office.

==== Results ====
1996 U.S. House election
Party	Candidate	Votes	%	±%
Democratic	Frank Pallone Jr. (incumbent)	124,635	61.25%	▲0.89
Republican	Steve Corodemus	73,402	36.07%	▼1.46
Independent	Keith Quarles	2,044	1.00%	N/A
Independent	Richard Sorrentino	1,509	0.74%	N/A
Independent	Susan H. Normandin	1,247	0.61%	N/A
Independent	Stefanie C. Trice	641	0.32%	N/A
Total votes		203,478	100.00%	
Democratic hold		Swing	{{{swing}}}	

== District 7 ==
1996 New Jersey's 7th congressional district election
- November 5, 1996
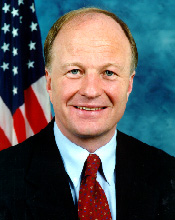

Nominee	Bob Franks	Larry Lerner
Party	Republican	Democratic
Popular vote	128,817	97,283
Percentage	55.4%	41.8%
U.S. Representative before election
Bob Franks
Republican
Elected U.S. Representative
Bob Franks
Republican

Incumbent Bob Franks won. This district included parts of Essex, Middlesex, Somerset, and Union counties.

=== Republican primary ===
==== Candidates ====
- Bob Franks, incumbent Representative from Summit since 1993

==== Results ====
1996 Republican primary
Party	Candidate	Votes	%
Republican	Bob Franks (incumbent)	14,193	100.00%
Total votes		14,193	100.00%

=== Democratic primary ===
==== Candidates ====
- Larry Lerner, Union Township attorney and civil rights activist

==== Results ====
1996 Democratic primary
Party	Candidate	Votes	%
Democratic	Larry Lerner	12,760	100.00%
Total votes		12,760	100.00%

=== General election ===
==== Candidates ====
- Dorothy De Laura (Independent)
- Bob Franks, incumbent Representative from Summit since 1993 (Republican)
- Nicholas W. Gentile (Independent)
- Larry Lerner, Union Township attorney and civil rights activist (Democratic)
- Robert G. Robertson (Independent)

==== Campaign ====
Lerner, a strong fundraiser, supported stringent environmental protections and jobs training programs for laid-off employees. He ran on a long record of activism, including suing to end tax exemptions for whites-only organizations in 1974 and lobbying for the release of wrongly imprisoned Jews in the former Soviet Union.

==== Results ====
1996 U.S. House election
Party	Candidate	Votes	%	±%
Republican	Bob Franks (incumbent)	128,817	55.39%	▼4.19
Democratic	Larry Lerner	97,283	41.83%	▲3.10
Independent	Dorothy De Laura	4,076	1.75%	N/A
Independent	Nicholas W. Gentile	1,693	0.73%	N/A
Independent	Robert G. Robertson	696	0.30%	N/A
Total votes		232,565	100.00%	
Republican hold		Swing	{{{swing}}}	

== District 8 ==
1996 New Jersey's 8th congressional district election
- November 5, 1996
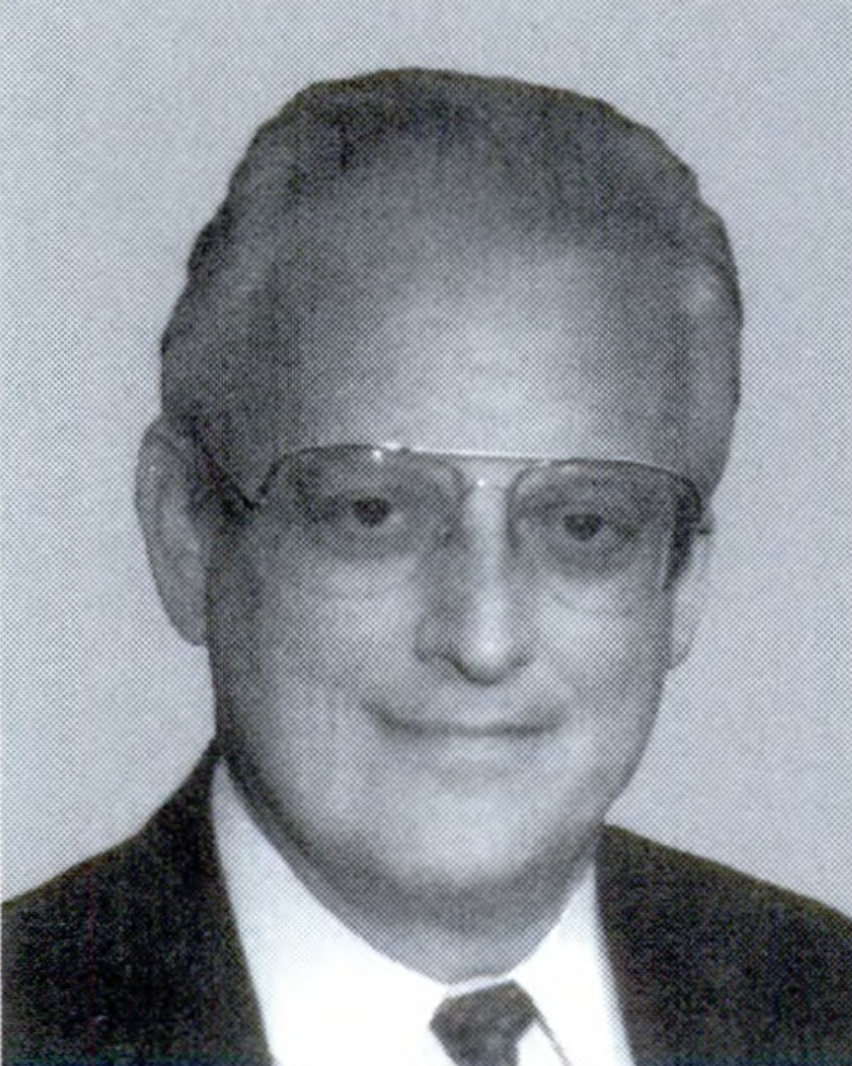

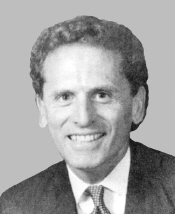
Nominee	Bill Pascrell	Bill Martini
Party	Democratic	Republican
Popular vote	98,853	92,604
Percentage	51.2%	48.0%
U.S. Representative before election
Bill Martini
Republican
Elected U.S. Representative
Bill Pascrell
Democratic

Incumbent Republican Bill Martini ran for a second term in office but was defeated by Paterson mayor Bill Pascrell. This district included parts of Essex and Passaic counties.

=== Republican primary ===
==== Candidates ====
- Bill Martini, incumbent Representative from Clifton since 1995

==== Results ====
1996 Republican primary
Party	Candidate	Votes	%
Republican	Bill Martini (incumbent)	6,871	100.00%
Total votes		6,871	100.00%

=== Democratic primary ===
==== Candidates ====
- Bill Pascrell, mayor of Paterson and assemblyman

==== Declined ====
- Herb Klein, former Representative for this district (1993–95)

==== Results ====
1996 Democratic primary
Party	Candidate	Votes	%
Democratic	Bill Pascrell	14,135	100.00%
Total votes		14,135	100.00%

=== General election ===
==== Candidates ====
- Jeffrey Levine (Independent)
- Bill Martini, incumbent Representative from Clifton since 1995 (Republican)
- Bill Pascrell, mayor of Paterson and assemblyman (Democratic)

==== Campaign ====
The Democratic Party considered this their best opportunity to gain a seat in New Jersey in 1996; both parties agreed that it was a close contest. The candidates predicted they would spend more than $1 million each, making this the most expensive race in the state.

Pascrell focused on social issues, calling for federally financed anti-crime programs. He also sought to tie Martini to House speaker Newt Gingrich and the Contract with America, much of which Martini had supported during his term in office. Pascrell criticized the Republican Congress for proposing to slow the increase in federal Medicare spending by $270 billion over the next seven years.

Martini focused his campaign on fiscal issues, calling for spending cuts and a reduction in the size of the federal government. He sought to distance himself from Republican congressional leadership, stressing his record on environmental protection and support for an increase in the federal minimum wage. Given his efforts to prevent development of the 17,500-acre Sterling Forest in New York, he won the endorsement of the Sierra Club.

Both candidates supported a balanced-budget amendment and an overall reduction in the capital gains tax rate.

==== Endorsements ====
Bill Martini

Organizations

- Sierra Club

==== Results ====
1996 U.S. House election
Party	Candidate	Votes	%	±%
Democratic	Bill Pascrell Jr.	98,853	51.20%	▲2.63
Republican	Bill Martini (incumbent)	92,604	47.96%	▼1.91
Independent	Jeffrey Levine	1,621	0.84%	N/A
Total votes		193,078	100.00%	
Democratic hold		Swing	{{{swing}}}	

== District 9 ==
1996 New Jersey's 9th congressional district election
- November 5, 1996
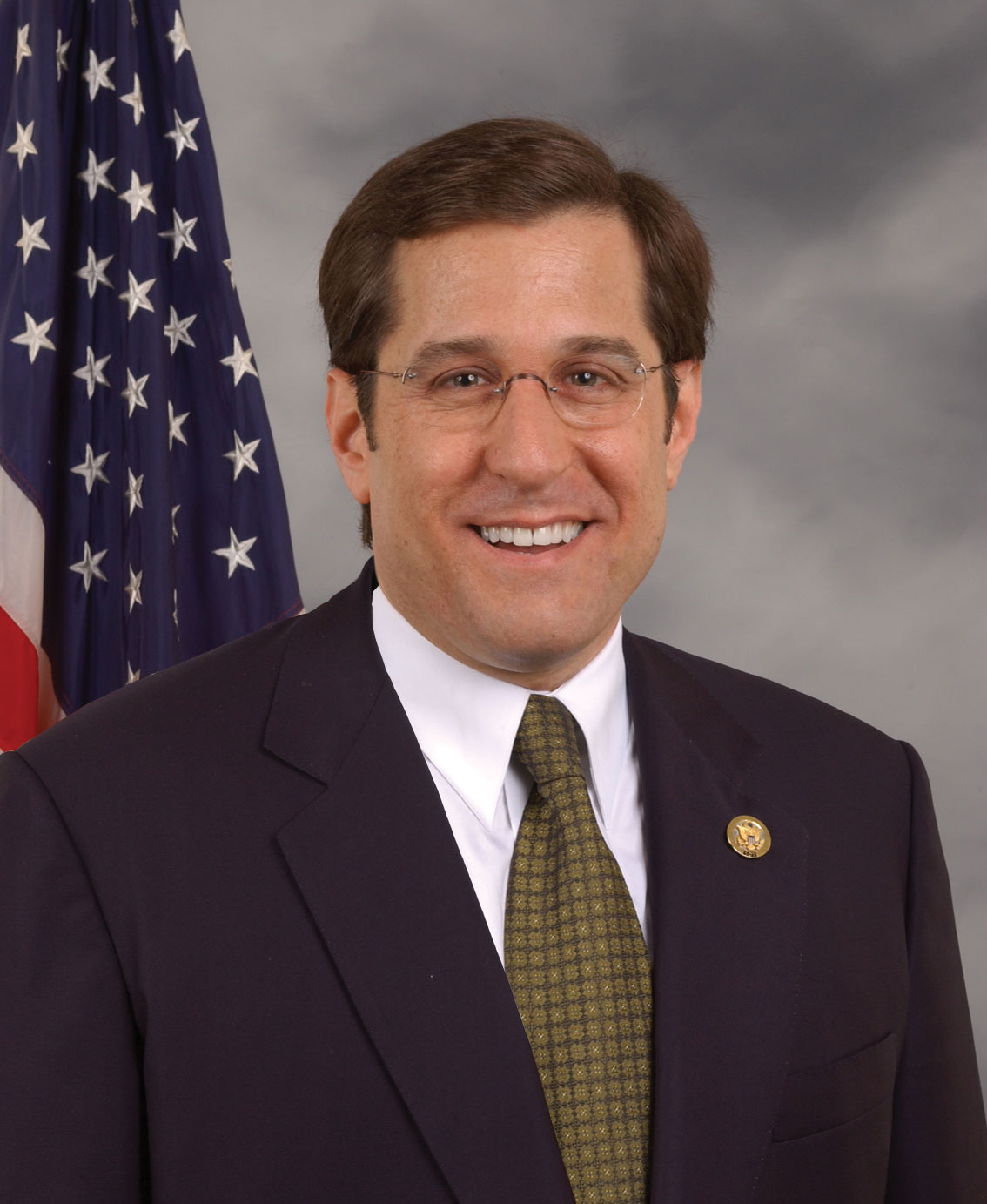

Nominee	Steve Rothman	Kathleen Donovan
Party	Democratic	Republican
Popular vote	117,646	89,005
Percentage	56.2%	42.5%
U.S. Representative before election
Bob Torricelli
Democratic
Elected U.S. Representative
Steve Rothman
Democratic

Incumbent Democrat Bob Torricelli did not run for re-election, choosing instead to run for the open U.S. Senate seat vacated by Bill Bradley. In the race to succeed him, Steve Rothman defeated Kathleen Donovan.

=== Democratic primary ===
==== Candidates ====
- Lynne Athay Dow, Teaneck psychologist
- Robert Gordon, healthcare management consultant and former mayor of Fair Lawn
- Steve Rothman, Bergen County Surrogate and former mayor of Englewood

===== Declined =====
- Bob Torricelli, incumbent Representative since 1983 (ran for U.S. Senate)

==== Endorsements ====
Steve Rothman

U.S. representatives

- Bob Torricelli, incumbent Representative for this district

Political parties

- Bergen County Democratic Party
- Hudson County Democratic Party

==== Results ====
1996 Democratic primary
Party	Candidate	Votes	%
Democratic	Steve Rothman	17,016	79.47%
Democratic	Robert Gordon	3,715	17.35%
Democratic	Lynne Athay Dow	680	3.18%
Total votes		21,411	100.00%

=== Republican primary ===
==== Candidates ====
- Kathleen Donovan, Bergen County Clerk, former assemblywoman from Hackensack, and former chair of the New Jersey Republican Party and Port Authority of New York and New Jersey

==== Results ====
1996 Republican primary
Party	Candidate	Votes	%
Republican	Kathleen Donovan	8,152	100.00%
Total votes		8,152	100.00%

=== General election ===
==== Candidates ====
- Kathleen Donovan, Bergen County Clerk, former assemblywoman from Hackensack, and former chair of the New Jersey Republican Party and Port Authority of New York and New Jersey (Republican)
- Leon Myerson (Independent)
- Arthur B. Rosen (Independent)
- Steve Rothman, Bergen County Surrogate Court judge and former mayor of Englewood (Democratic)

==== Campaign ====
Both candidates ran on socially liberal platforms, supporting abortion rights, gun control, and federal funding for environmental protection. Donovan portrayed herself an independently minded moderate and voiced her opposition to presidential nominee Bob Dole's proposal for a 15 percent tax cut. Rothman called for a tax deduction on college tuition.

Despite the Democratic lean of the district and the strength of Bill Clinton and Bob Torricelli atop the ticket, both parties devoted significant resources to the district. Donovan, who was considered the more recognizable candidate, was the strongest Republican nominee in many years. She won the endorsement of Local 346, a laborers union.

==== Endorsements ====
Kathleen Donovan (R)

Labor unions

- Laborers Union Local 346

==== Results ====
1996 U.S. House election
Party	Candidate	Votes	%	±%
Democratic	Steve Rothman	117,646	56.19%	▼6.34
Republican	Kathleen Donovan	89,005	42.51%	▲6.46
Independent	Arthur B. Rosen	2,730	1.30%	N/A
Independent	Leon Myerson	1,549	0.74%	N/A
Total votes		209,381	100.00%	
Democratic hold		Swing	{{{swing}}}	

== District 10 ==
1996 New Jersey's 10th congressional district election
- November 5, 1996
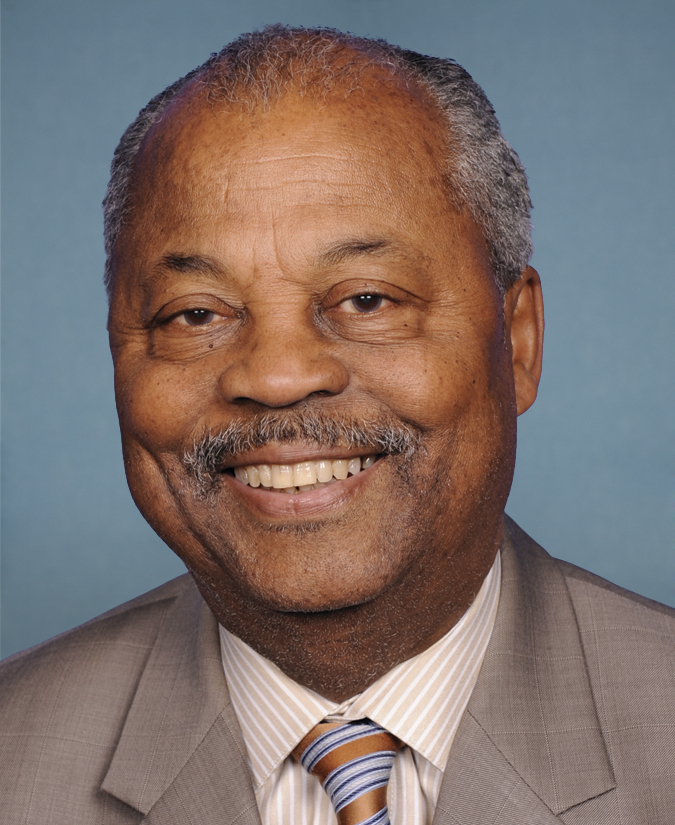

Nominee	Donald M. Payne	Vanessa Williams
Party	Democratic	Republican
Popular vote	127,126	22,086
Percentage	84.2%	14.6%
U.S. Representative before election
Donald M. Payne
Democratic
Elected U.S. Representative
Donald M. Payne
Democratic

Incumbent Democrat Donald M. Payne won. The district included parts of Essex, Hudson, and Union counties.

=== Democratic primary ===
==== Candidates ====
- Cecil J. Banks, Orange attorney
- Brian Connors
- Donald M. Payne, incumbent Representative from Newark since 1989

==== Results ====
1996 Democratic primary
Party	Candidate	Votes	%
Democratic	Donald M. Payne (incumbent)	35,002	82.39%
Democratic	Brian Connors	4,421	10.41%
Democratic	Cecil J. Banks	3,062	7.21%
Total votes		42,485	100.00%

=== Republican primary ===
==== Candidates ====
- Vanessa Williams, Newark attorney

==== Results ====
1996 Republican primary
Party	Candidate	Votes	%
Republican	Vanessa Williams	2,483	100.00%
Total votes		2,483	100.00%

=== General election ===
==== Candidates ====
- Toni M. Jackson (Independent)
- Donald M. Payne, incumbent Representative from Newark since 1989 (Democratic)
- Harley Tyler (Independent)
- Vanessa Williams, Newark attorney (Republican)

==== Campaign ====
Williams deviated from the Republican platform by supporting affirmative action and the right to an abortion. Otherwise, she supported work requirements for welfare, a balanced budget amendment, and school vouchers. Despite the district's overwhelming Democratic lean, she stated, "I fully expect and intend to beat Congressman Payne."

==== Results ====
1996 U.S. House election
Party	Candidate	Votes	%	±%
Democratic	Donald M. Payne (incumbent)	127,126	84.16%	▲9.29
Republican	Vanessa Williams	22,086	14.62%	▼7.26
Independent	Harley Tyler	1,192	0.79%	N/A
Independent	Toni M. Jackson	656	0.43%	N/A
Total votes		151,060	100.00%	
Democratic hold		Swing	{{{swing}}}	

== District 11 ==
1996 New Jersey's 11th congressional district election
- November 5, 1996
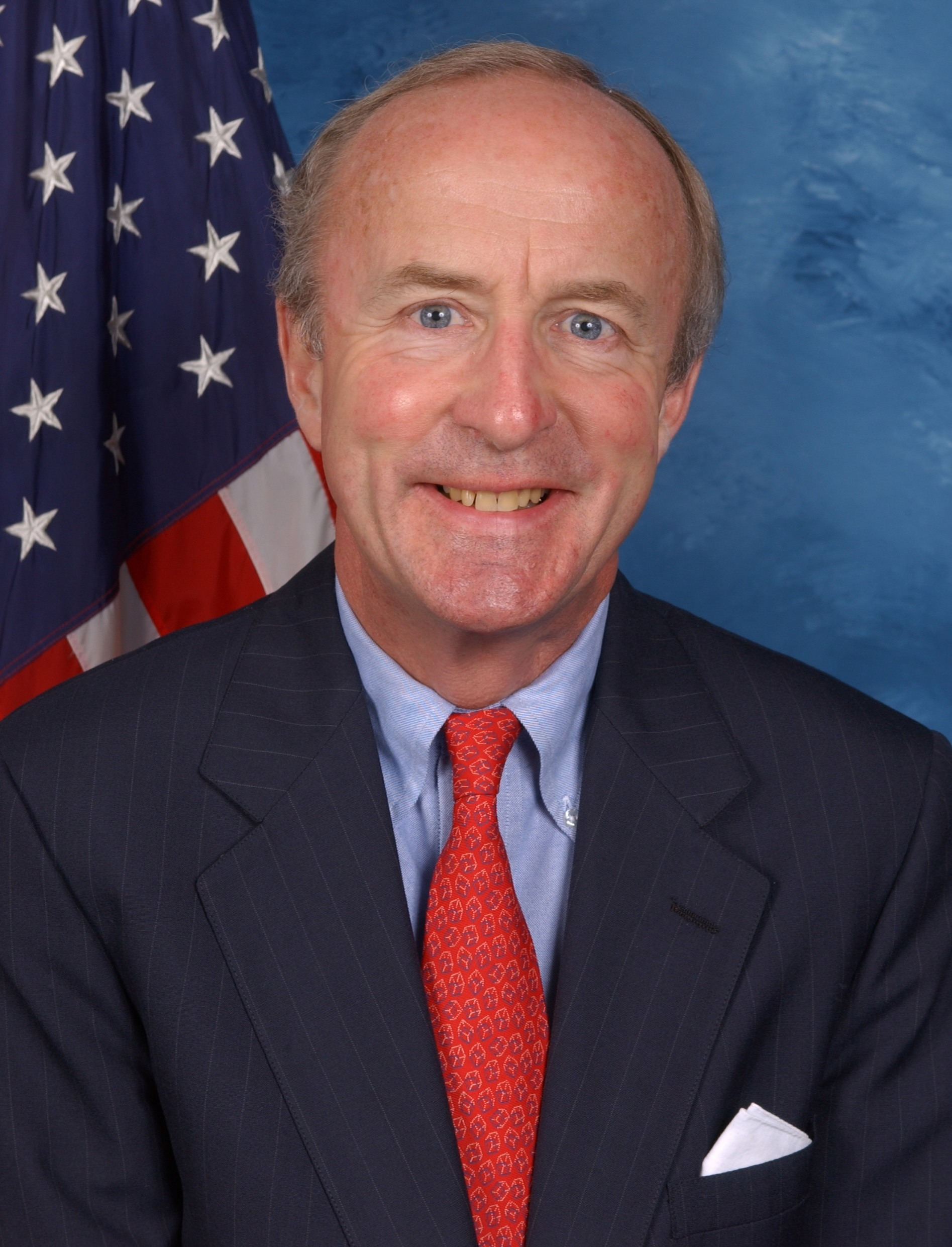

Nominee	Rodney Frelinghuysen	Chris Evangel
Party	Republican	Democratic
Popular vote	169,091	78,742
Percentage	66.3%	30.9%
U.S. Representative before election
Rodney Frelinghuysen
Republican
Elected U.S. Representative
Rodney Frelinghuysen
Republican

Incumbent Republican Rodney Frelinghuysen won. This district consisted of all of Morris County and parts of Essex, Passaic, Somerset, and Sussex counties.

=== Republican primary ===
==== Candidates ====
- Rodney Frelinghuysen, incumbent Representative since 1995

==== Results ====
1996 Republican primary
Party	Candidate	Votes	%
Republican	Rodney Frelinghuysen (incumbent)	27,440	100.00%
Total votes		27,440	100.00%

=== Democratic primary ===
==== Candidates ====
- Chris Evangel, Morristown municipal bond analyst
- John Kucek, Holocaust revisionist and candidate for this district in 1994

==== Results ====
1996 Democratic primary
Party	Candidate	Votes	%
Democratic	Chris Evangel	8,421	92.56%
Democratic	John Kucek	677	7.44%
Total votes		9,098	100.00%

=== General election ===
==== Candidates ====
- Ed de Mott (Independent)
- Chris Evangel, Morristown municipal bond analyst (Democratic)
- Austin S. Lett (Independent)
- Rodney Frelinghuysen, incumbent Representative since 1995 (Republican)
- Victoria S. Spruiell (Independent)

==== Campaign ====
Evangel ran on a liberal platform, proposing increased employment training grants, incentives for teenage mothers to stay in school, tax breaks for companies that train laid-off workers, and increased funding for environmental programs. Frelinghuysen, a first-term incumbent, had already secured a powerful position on the House Appropriations Committee and supported funding for the mass transit, Superfund cleanups, and housing for the elderly and disabled.

==== Results ====
1996 U.S. House election
Party	Candidate	Votes	%	±%
Republican	Rodney Frelinghuysen (incumbent)	169,091	66.27%	▼4.93
Democratic	Chris Evangel	78,742	30.86%	▲2.90
Independent	Ed de Mott	2,870	1.12%	N/A
Independent	Austin S. Lett	2,618	1.03%	N/A
Independent	Victoria S. Spruiell	1,837	0.72%	N/A
Total votes		255,158	100.00%	
Republican hold		Swing	{{{swing}}}	

== District 12 ==
1996 New Jersey's 12th congressional district election
- November 5, 1996
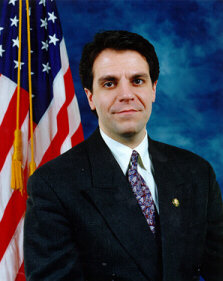

Nominee	Mike Pappas	David Del Vecchio
Party	Republican	Democratic
Popular vote	135,811	125,594
Percentage	51.2%	47.3%
U.S. Representative before election
Dick Zimmer
Republican
Elected U.S. Representative
Mike Pappas
Republican

Incumbent Republican Dick Zimmer did not run for re-election, choosing instead to run for the open U.S. Senate seat vacated by Bill Bradley. Somerset County freeholder Mike Pappas defeated Lambertville mayor David Del Vecchio in the general election to succeed Zimmer.

This district, based in Central Jersey, included all of Hunterdon County and parts of Mercer, Middlesex, Monmouth and Somerset counties.

=== Republican primary ===
==== Candidates ====
- John O. Bennett, state senator from Little Silver and senate majority leader
- Luis de Agustin
- Leonard Lance, assemblyman from Clinton Township
- Mike Pappas, Somerset County Freeholder and former mayor of Franklin

==== Results ====
1996 Republican primary
Party	Candidate	Votes	%
Republican	Mike Pappas	11,069	38.07%
Republican	John O. Bennett	9,894	34.03%
Republican	Leonard Lance	7,630	26.24%
Republican	Luis de Agustin	481	1.65%
Total votes		29,074	100.00%

=== Democratic primary ===
==== Candidates ====
- David Del Vecchio, mayor of Lambertville and chair of the Hunterdon County Democratic Party
- Rush Holt Jr., assistant director of the Princeton Plasma Physics Laboratory and son of U.S. Senator Rush Holt
- Carl J. Mayer, consumer advocate and member of the Princeton Township Committee

==== Results ====
1996 Democratic primary
Party	Candidate	Votes	%
Democratic	David Del Vecchio	9,157	45.11%
Democratic	Carl J. Mayer	6,373	31.39%
Democratic	Rush Holt Jr.	4,771	23.50%
Total votes		20,301	100.00%

=== General election ===
==== Candidates ====
- Philip G. Cenicola (Independent)
- David Del Vecchio, mayor of Lambertville and chair of the Hunterdon County Democratic Party (Democratic)
- Virginia A. Flynn (Independent)
- Joseph M. Mercurio (Independent)
- Mike Pappas, Somerset County Freeholder and former mayor of Franklin (Republican)

==== Campaign ====
Del Vecchio, a relatively nonpartisan candidate, ran on his support of the Brady Bill, won the endorsement of the Sierra Club, and opposed prayer in schools. Pappas supported welfare reform and tax reform.

In a reversal of typical party positions, Del Vecchio supported the death penalty while Pappas opposed it. However, the candidates were most sharply divided on abortion rights, which Del Vecchio supported and Pappas strongly condemned. Pappas defended himself against accusations that he was a single-issue candidate or radical, arguing, "The radical positions of the Democrats are what is out of the mainstream."

==== Results ====
1996 U.S. House election
Party	Candidate	Votes	%	±%
Republican	Mike Pappas	135,811	51.20%	▼17.14
Democratic	David Del Vecchio	125,594	47.35%	▲16.97
Independent	Virginia A. Flynn	3,955	1.49%	N/A
Independent	Joseph M. Mercurio	2,650	1.00%	N/A
Independent	Philip G. Cenicola	1,211	0.46%	N/A
Total votes		265,266	100.00%	
Republican hold		Swing	{{{swing}}}	

== District 13 ==
1996 New Jersey's 13th congressional district election
- November 5, 1996
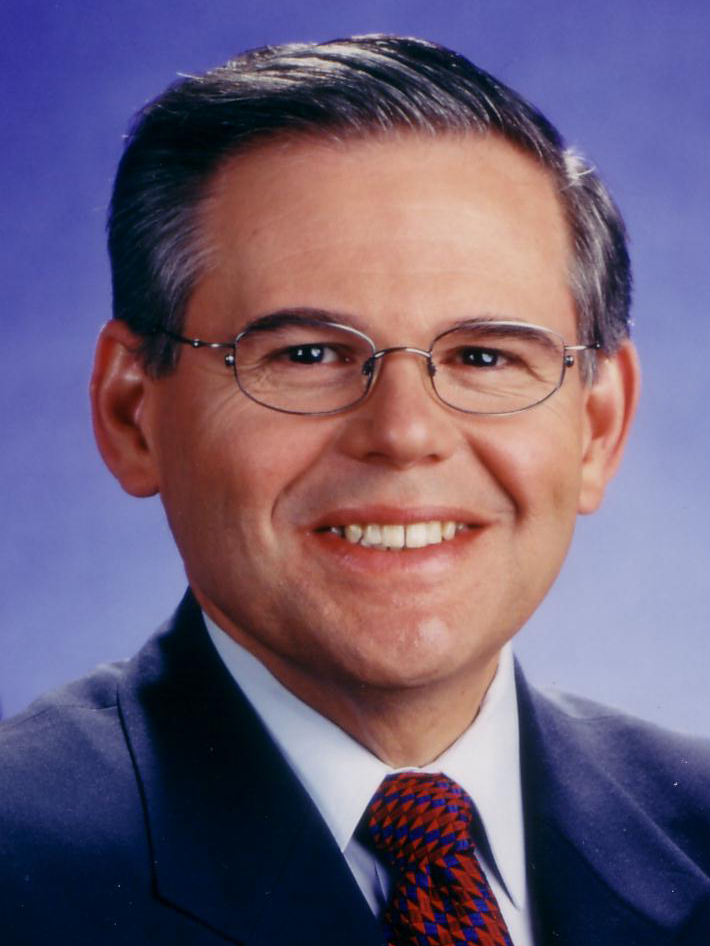

Nominee	Bob Menendez	Carlos E. Munoz
Party	Democratic	Republican
Popular vote	115,457	25,426
Percentage	78.8%	17.4%
U.S. Representative before election
Bob Menendez
Democratic
Elected U.S. Representative
Bob Menendez
Democratic

Incumbent Democrat Bob Menendez won. This district included parts of Essex, Hudson, Middlesex, and Union counties.

=== Democratic primary ===
==== Candidates ====
- Christopher Curioli
- Bob Menendez, incumbent Representative from Union City since 1993

==== Results ====
1996 Democratic primary
Party	Candidate	Votes	%
Democratic	Bob Menendez (incumbent)	34,685	92.82%
Democratic	Christopher Curioli	2,685	7.18%
Total votes		37,370	100.00%

=== Republican primary ===
==== Candidates ====
- Dick Hester
- Carlos E. Munoz, nominee for state senate in 1982 and 1991 and freeholder in 1990
- Kenneth Suria

==== Results ====
1996 Republican primary
Party	Candidate	Votes	%
Republican	Carlos E. Munoz	2,482	58.66%
Republican	Kenneth C. Suria	1,284	30.35%
Republican	Dick Hester	465	10.99%
Total votes		4,231	100.00%

=== General election ===
==== Candidates ====
- Mike Buoncristiano (Independent)
- William P. Estrada (Independent)
- Bob Menendez, incumbent Representative from Union City since 1993 (Democratic)
- Carlos E. Munoz, Republican nominee for state senate in 1982 and 1991 and freeholder in 1990 (Republican)
- Rupert Ravens (Independent)
- Herbert H. Shaw, perennial candidate (Independent)

==== Campaign ====
Although Munoz was well-known from his prior campaigns for office, he had never won a race. The typically Democratic district was expected to favor Menendez, who had strong cross-party support from Hispanic voters in the district.

==== Results ====
1996 U.S. House election
Party	Candidate	Votes	%	±%
Democratic	Bob Menendez (incumbent)	115,457	78.83%	▲7.93
Republican	Carlos E. Munoz	25,426	17.36%	▼7.85
Independent	Herbert Shaw	2,136	1.46%	▲0.08
Independent	Mike Buoncristiano	2,094	1.43%	N/A
Independent	William P. Estrada	720	0.49%	N/A
Independent	Rupert Ravens	637	0.43%	N/A
Total votes		146,470	100.00%	
Democratic hold		Swing	{{{swing}}}	
