= SEC Regulatory Accountability Act =

US financial bill

- Long title: To improve the consideration by the Securities and Exchange Commission of the costs and benefits of its regulations and orders.
- Announced in: the 113th United States Congress
- Sponsored by: Rep. Scott Garrett (R, NJ-5)
- Number of co-sponsors: 15

Codification
- Acts affected: Investment Advisers Act of 1940, Investment Company Act of 1940, Paperwork Reduction Act, SEC Regulatory Accountability Act, Sarbanes-Oxley Act of 2002, Securities Act of 1933, Securities Exchange Act of 1934
- U.S.C. sections affected: 15 U.S.C. § 78w, 15 U.S.C. § 7262(b), 5 U.S.C. § 804(2), 44 U.S.C. § 3506(c), 5 U.S.C. § 556, 5 U.S.C. § 557, 15 U.S.C. § 78o–3
- Agencies affected: United States Congress, U.S. Securities and Exchange Commission,

Legislative history
- Introduced in the House as H.R. 1062 by Rep. Scott Garrett (R-NJ) on March 12, 2013; Committee consideration by United States House Committee on Financial Services, United States House Financial Services Subcommittee on Capital Markets and Government-Sponsored Enterprises, United States Senate Committee on Banking, Housing, and Urban Affairs; Passed the House on May 17, 2013 (Roll Call Vote 160: 235-161)

The SEC Regulatory Accountability Act (H.R. 1062) is a bill that was introduced into the United States House of Representatives in the 113th United States Congress. The bill would amend the Securities Exchange Act of 1934 to give new directions to the Securities and Exchange Commission (SEC) governing its regulation creation and amendment process. The SEC would be required to assess the significance of the problem they are considering addressing, determine whether the estimated costs would outweigh the estimated benefits, and identify alternatives to their proposed regulation. The bill is intended to help protect the financial sector from excessive, burdensome regulations created by the SEC. The bill would do this by ordering the SEC to conduct a cost-benefit study before issuing any new rules to ensure that the expected benefits of the new rule would outweigh the expected costs of imposing it.

== Background ==
The U.S. Securities and Exchange Commission (SEC) is an agency of the United States federal government. It holds primary responsibility for enforcing the federal securities laws and regulating the securities industry, the nation's stock and options exchanges, and other electronic securities markets in the United States.

The SEC was "in the process of finalizing scores of new rules," including ones related to Dodd–Frank Wall Street Reform and Consumer Protection Act, at the time that this bill was introduced and voted on by the house. Most other agencies are already required to run cost-benefit analyses, the SEC has previously been exempt from Office of Management and Budget oversight.

== Provisions/Elements of the bill ==
This summary is based largely on the summary provided by the Congressional Research Service, a public domain source.

The SEC Regulatory Accountability Act would amend the Securities Exchange Act of 1934 to direct the Securities and Exchange Commission (SEC), before issuing a regulation under the securities laws, to:

(1) identify the nature and source of the problem that the proposed regulation is designed to address in order to assess whether any new regulation is warranted;
(2) use the SEC Chief Economist to assess the costs and benefits of the intended regulation and adopt it only upon a reasoned determination that its benefits justify the costs;
(3) identify and assess available alternatives that were considered; and
(4) ensure that any regulation is accessible, consistent, written in plain language, and easy to understand.

The SEC Regulatory Accountability Act would also require the SEC to:

(1) consider whether the rulemaking will promote efficiency, competition, and capital formation;
(2) consider the impact of the regulation upon investor choice, market liquidity, and small business;
(3) explain in its final rule the nature of comments received concerning the proposed rule or rule change; and
(4) respond to those comments, explaining any changes made in response and the reasons that it did not incorporate industry group concerns regarding potential costs or benefits.

The SEC Regulatory Accountability Act would also require the SEC to:

(1) review its existing regulations periodically to determine if they are outmoded, ineffective, insufficient, or excessively burdensome; and
(2) modify, streamline, expand, or repeal them.

The SEC Regulatory Accountability Act would also require the SEC, whenever it adopts or amends a major rule, to state in its adopting release:

(1) the purposes and intended consequences of the regulation,
(2) the post-implementation quantitative and qualitative metrics to measure the economic impact of the regulation and the extent to which it has accomplished the stated purposes,
(3) the assessment plan that will be used under the supervision of the Chief Economist to assess whether the regulation has achieved those purposes, and
(4) any foreseeable unintended or negative consequences.

The SEC Regulatory Accountability Act would require the assessment plan to:

(1) consider the costs, benefits, and intended and unintended consequences of the regulation; and
(2) specify the data to be collected, the methods for its collection and analysis, and an assessment completion date.

The SEC Regulatory Accountability Act would waive notice and comment requirements for the data collection if the SEC has published its assessment plan for notice and comment at least 30 days before adoption of a final regulation or amendment.

Finally the SEC Regulatory Accountability Act would express the sense of Congress that other regulatory entities, including the Public Company Accounting Oversight Board, the Municipal Securities Rulemaking Board, and any national securities association registered under the Securities Exchange Act of 1934, should also follow the requirements set forth by this title.

== Congressional Budget Office Report ==
H.R. 1062 would expand the amount of analysis performed by the Securities and Exchange Commission (SEC) when developing or amending regulations. Specifically, the bill would direct the SEC to:

- Assess the significance of the problem the regulation is designed to address;
- Determine whether the estimated costs of the proposed regulation justify its estimated benefits; and
- Identify alternatives to the proposed regulation that are available.

Further, under the bill, the SEC would be required to review its regulations every five years to determine whether they are outmoded, ineffective, or excessively burdensome. Using the results of the review, the agency would then need to consider modifying or repealing such rules.

For major rules (that is, rules expected to have an economic impact greater than $100 million annually), the bill would require the SEC to develop and publish a plan to assess whether the regulation has achieved its stated purposes. H.R. 1062 would direct the agency, no later than two years after the date such a rule was published, to publish a report assessing the costs, benefits, and consequences of the rule using performance measures that were identified when the rule was adopted.

Based on information from the SEC, CBO estimates that the commission would ultimately need 20 additional staff positions (less than a 1 percent increase in the agency’s 2012 staffing level) to handle the new rulemaking, reporting, and analytical activities required under the bill. CBO estimates that implementing H.R. 1062 would cost the SEC $23 million over the 2013–2018 period, assuming appropriation of the necessary amounts, for additional personnel and overhead expenses. Under current law, the SEC is authorized to collect fees sufficient to offset its annual appropriation; therefore, CBO estimates that the net budgetary effect of the SEC’s activities to implement H.R. 1062 would not be significant, assuming appropriation actions consistent with the commission’s authorities.

Assuming that the SEC increases fees to offset the costs of implementing the additional regulatory activities required by the bill, H.R. 1062 would increase the cost of an existing mandate on private entities required to pay those fees. Based on information from the SEC, CBO estimates that the aggregate cost of the mandate would fall well below the annual threshold for private-sector mandates established in UMRA ($150 million in 2013, adjusted annually for inflation).

== Procedural history ==
Congress	Short title	Bill number(s)	Date introduced	Sponsor(s)	# of cosponsors	Latest status
112th Congress	SEC Regulatory Accountability Act	H.R. 2308	June 23, 2011	Scott Garrett (R-NJ)	19	Died in committee
112th Congress	SEC Regulatory Accountability Act	S. 2373	April 26, 2012	David Vitter (R-LA)	0	Died in committee
113th Congress	SEC Regulatory Accountability Act	H.R. 1062	March 12, 2013	Scott Garrett (R-NJ)	23	Passed House (235-161)
114th Congress	SEC Regulatory Accountability Act	H.R. 5429	June 9, 2016	Scott Garrett (R-NJ)	2	Died in committee
115th Congress	SEC Regulatory Accountability Act	H.R. 78	January 3, 2017	Ann Wagner (R-MO)	3	Passed House (243-184)

=== House ===
The SEC Regulatory Accountability Act was introduced into the House on March 12, 2013 by Rep. Scott Garrett (R-NJ). It was then referred to the United States House Committee on Financial Services and the United States House Financial Services Subcommittee on Capital Markets and Government-Sponsored Enterprises. House Majority Leader Eric Cantor announced on Friday May 10, 2013 that H.R. 1580 would be considered the following week. As of May 15, 2013, the bill had 23 co-sponsors, all of them Republicans. On May 17, 2013, the House voted in Roll Call Vote 160 to pass the bill 235-161. Seventeen Democrats voted in favor of the bill.

=== Senate ===
The SEC Regulatory Accountability Act was received in the Senate on May 20, 2013 and referred to the United States Senate Committee on Banking, Housing, and Urban Affairs.

== Debate and discussion ==
Republicans argued in favor of the bill as an important measure to improve the economy and prevent the SEC from overburdening private companies with regulation. House Majority Leader Eric Cantor said "The American economy is hurting, and what we need is less government standing in the way of the private sector, not more." Republicans also pointed to a 2011 court case in the U.S. Court of Appeals for the District of Columbia that struck down an SEC rule for failing to properly frame the benefits and costs of the rule.

Democrats argued that this bill was designed to stop Dodd-Frank, a bill that made major regulatory reform to the American financial sector. Maxine Waters, the ranking Financial Services Committee member, said that "the purpose of this legislative effort is to stop implementation of the Dodd-Frank Wall Street Reform and Consumer Protection Act dead in its tracks."

On May 15, 2013, the President Obama released a Statement of Administration Policy on H.R. 1062 in which he said that the Administration opposes passage of the bill. The Administration said that the analytical requirements added by the bill, such as the required cost-benefit analyses, "could result in unnecessary delays in the rulemaking process, thereby undermining the ability of the SEC to effectively execute its statutory mandates." The statement did not threaten a veto. The statement did acknowledge that the bill was similar to an Executive Order already issued by the White House that would make similar requirements.

== See also ==
- Securities Exchange Act of 1934
- U.S. Securities and Exchange Commission
- Securities regulation in the United States
- List of bills in the 113th United States Congress
