= George F. Neutze =

New Jersey politician (1908–1969)

Judge of Compensation
- In office 1954 – August 1, 1969
- Appointed by: Robert B. Meyner

Minority Leader of the New Jersey General Assembly
- In office 1950

Member of the New Jersey General Assembly from Camden County
- In office 1950–1951
- In office 1944–1946

Personal details
- Born: October 8, 1908 Camden, New Jersey, US
- Died: August 1, 1969 (aged 60) Rancocas Valley Hospital, Willingboro Township, New Jersey, US
- Education: South Jersey College; South Jersey Law School

George F. Neutze (October 8, 1908 – August 1, 1969) was an American Democratic Party politician who represented Camden County in the New Jersey General Assembly.

== Early life and education ==
Neutze was born in Camden, New Jersey. He graduated in 1928 from Collingswood High School and in 1932 from South Jersey College (since renamed as Rutgers University–Camden) and earned a degree in law in 1935 from South Jersey Law School (since part of Rutgers Law School.

== Political career ==
A resident of Haddonfield, New Jersey, Neutze represented Camden County from 1944 to 1946 and 1950 to 1951, becoming Assembly minority leader in 1950.

Neutze ran for United States House of Representatives for New Jersey's 1st Congressional district in 1946, but lost to incumbent Representative Charles A. Wolverton.

In 1954, Neutze was appointed as a Judge of Compensation by then Governor Robert B. Meyner, a position he would hold until his death in 1969.

== Electoral history ==
=== United States House of Representatives ===
United States House elections, 1946
Party	Candidate	Votes	%
Republican	Charles A. Wolverton (incumbent)	82,919	63.52
Democratic	George F. Neutze	47,631	36.48
Total votes		130,550	100
