= Eglington Cemetery, Clarksboro =

Cemetery in Gloucester County, New Jersey

Coordinates: 39.7965°N 75.2224°W

Eglington Cemetery is a cemetery located in the Clarksboro section of East Greenwich Township, in Gloucester County, New Jersey, United States.

== Notable interments ==
- Robert C. Hendrickson (1898–1964), United States Senator from New Jersey from 1949 to 1955.
- Joshua B. Howell (1806–1864), Civil War general
- Henry C. Loudenslager (1852–1911), represented New Jersey's 1st congressional district from 1893 to 1911.
- James Matlack (1775–1840), United States congressman from New Jersey from 1821–1825.
- Ray Narleski (1928–2012), Major League Baseball player from 1954–1959.
- Jackie Mclaughlin (1933-1964), Popular South Jersey, Race Car Driver from 1950-1964
