= George Hires =

American politician

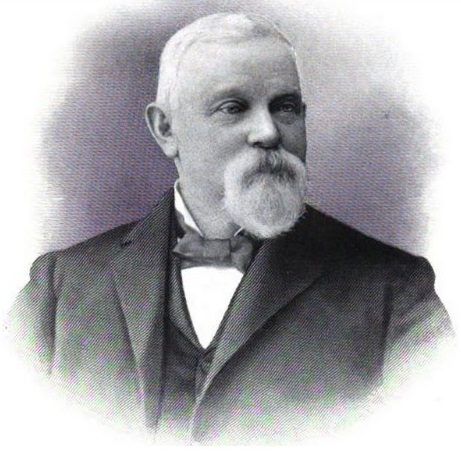
- From Volume I of 1900's Biographical, Genealogical and Descriptive History of the First Congressional District of New Jersey.

Member of the U.S. House of Representatives from New Jersey's 1st district
- In office March 4, 1885 – March 3, 1889
- Preceded by: Thomas M. Ferrell
- Succeeded by: Christopher A. Bergen

Member of the New Jersey Senate
- In office 1881–1884
- Preceded by: Quinton Keasbey
- Succeeded by: Wyatt W. Miller

Sheriff of Salem County
- In office 1867–1869

Personal details
- Born: January 26, 1835 Elsinboro Township, New Jersey
- Died: February 16, 1911 (aged 76) Atlantic City, New Jersey
- Resting place: First Presbyterian Cemetery in Salem, New Jersey
- Party: Republican

George Hires (January 26, 1835 – February 16, 1911) was an American businessman and Republican Party politician who represented New Jersey's 1st congressional district in the United States House of Representatives for two terms from 1885 to 1889.

== Early life and education ==
Hires was born in Elsinboro Township, New Jersey on January 26, 1835. He attended the common schools and the Friends' School and received commercial training. He engaged in mercantile and manufacturing pursuits.

== Political career ==
He was sheriff of Salem County from 1867 to 1869, and was a member of the New Jersey Senate from 1881 to 1884.

=== Congress ===
Hires was elected as a Republican to the Forty-ninth and Fiftieth Congresses, serving in office from March 4, 1885 – March 3, 1889, but was not a candidate for renomination in 1888 to the 51st Congress.

== Later career ==
After leaving Congress, he resumed mercantile pursuits, and also engaged in banking. He was a delegate to the State constitutional convention in 1894 and a delegate to the 1896 Republican National Convention. He was a member of the Republican State committee for twelve years.

=== Death and burial ===
Hires died in Atlantic City, New Jersey on February 16, 1911, and was interred in the First Presbyterian Cemetery in Salem, New Jersey.

U.S. House of Representatives
Preceded by Thomas M. Ferrell	Member of the U.S. House of Representatives from New Jersey's 1st congressional district March 4, 1885 – March 3, 1889	Succeeded by Christopher A. Bergen
