= Christopher A. Bergen =

American politician (1841–1905)

Christopher Augustus Bergen
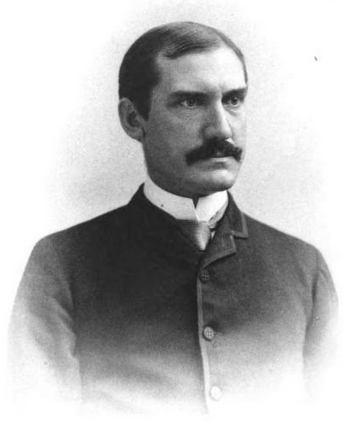
- From 1886's History of Camden County, New Jersey

Member of the U.S. House of Representatives from New Jersey's 1st district
- In office March 4, 1889 – March 3, 1893
- Preceded by: George Hires
- Succeeded by: Henry C. Loudenslager

Personal details
- Born: August 2, 1841 Bridge Point, New Jersey
- Died: February 18, 1905 (aged 63) Haverford, Pennsylvania
- Party: Republican
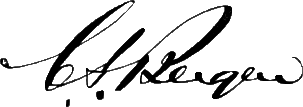
- Signature

Christopher Augustus Bergen (August 2, 1841 – February 18, 1905) was an American Republican Party politician who represented New Jersey's 1st congressional district in the United States House of Representatives for two terms from 1889 to 1893.

== Early life and education ==
Born in Bridge Point, New Jersey, Bergen attended Harlingen School and Edge Hill Classical School and was graduated from Princeton College, where he studied law, in 1863. He was licensed by the supreme court of New Jersey in 1866 as an attorney and commenced practice in Camden, New Jersey.

== Congress ==
Bergen was elected as a Republican to the 51st and 52nd Congresses, holding office from March 4, 1889, to March 3, 1893. He was an unsuccessful candidate for renomination in 1892, after which he resumed the practice of law.

== Retirement and death ==
In 1903, Bergen moved to Haverford, Pennsylvania, where he died on February 18, 1905. He was interred in Evergreen Cemetery, Camden, New Jersey.

== Family ==
His son, Martin V. Bergen, was also a lawyer, played football and baseball at Princeton University, and coached football at Princeton, Grinnell College, and the University of Virginia.

U.S. House of Representatives
Preceded by George Hires	Member of the U.S. House of Representatives from New Jersey's 1st congressional district March 4, 1889 – March 3, 1893	Succeeded by Henry C. Loudenslager
