= Thomas M. Ferrell =

American politician (1844–1916)

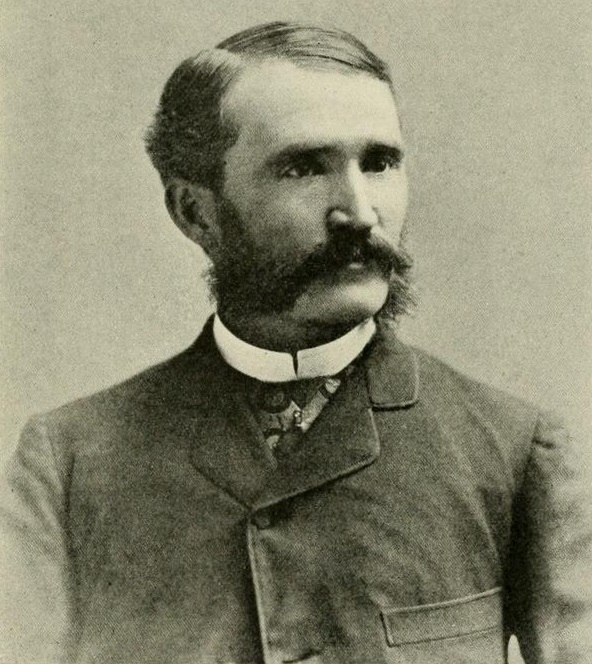

Member of the U.S. House of Representatives from New Jersey's 1st district
- In office March 4, 1883 – March 3, 1885
- Preceded by: George M. Robeson
- Succeeded by: George Hires

Member of the New Jersey Senate
- In office 1880-1881

Member of the New Jersey General Assembly
- In office 1879-1880

Personal details
- Born: Thomas Merrill Ferrell; June 20, 1844 Glassboro, New Jersey
- Died: October 20, 1916 (aged 72) Glassboro, New Jersey
- Resting place: Methodist Episcopal Cemetery
- Party: Democratic

Thomas Merrill Ferrell (June 20, 1844 – October 20, 1916) was an American businessman and Democratic Party politician who represented New Jersey's 1st congressional district in the United States House of Representatives for one term from 1883 to 1885.

== Early life and education ==
Born in Glassboro, New Jersey, Ferrell attended the common schools and completed an academic course.

== Political career ==
Ferrell was elected a member of the Glassboro township committee in 1872 and 1873. He served as president of Hollow Ware Glassworkers' Association from 1878 to 1883.

He served as member of the school board from 1885 to 1890, serving as its president in 1887. He served as member of the New Jersey General Assembly in 1879 and 1880, and as a member of the New Jersey Senate in 1880 and 1881.

=== Congress ===
In 1882, Ferrell was elected as a Democrat to the Forty-eighth Congress. He served in office from March 4, 1883 to March 3, 1885, but was an unsuccessful candidate for reelection in 1884 to the Forty-ninth Congress.

=== Internal revenue ===
When President Grover Cleveland was in office, Ferrell was appointed collector of internal revenue for the district.

== Later career and death ==
After leaving Congress, he was employed as a glassware salesman.

He died in Glassboro, New Jersey, October 20, 1916, and was interred in Methodist Episcopal Cemetery.

U.S. House of Representatives
Preceded by George M. Robeson	Member of the U.S. House of Representatives from New Jersey's 1st congressional district March 4, 1883 – March 3, 1885	Succeeded by George Hires
