= William J. Browning =

American politician (1850–1920)

William John Browning
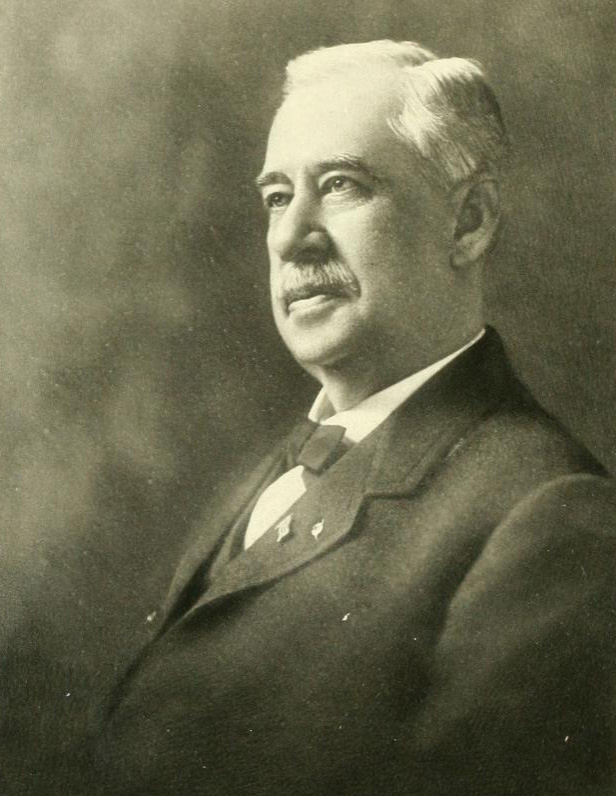

Member of the U.S. House of Representatives from New Jersey's 1st district
- In office November 7, 1911 – March 24, 1920
- Preceded by: Henry C. Loudenslager
- Succeeded by: Francis F. Patterson, Jr.

Personal details
- Born: April 11, 1850 Camden, New Jersey, U.S.
- Died: March 24, 1920 (aged 69) Washington, D.C., U.S.
- Party: Republican

William John Browning (April 11, 1850 – March 24, 1920) was an American merchant and Republican Party politician who represented New Jersey's 1st congressional district in the United States House of Representatives from 1911 until his death.

== Early life and education ==
William John Browning was born on April 11, 1850 in Camden, New Jersey to William Hinchman and Mary Cooper (née Boroughs) Browning. His parents were Quakers, and he was educated at Friends' Central High School in Philadelphia.

== Business career ==
After finishing his education, Browning joined the dry goods firm of Davis Kempton & Company at the age of fifteen. He eventually rose to become a partner of the firm and worked there for over thirty years.

In addition to his work at Davis Kempton, Browning held executive positions on the Camden and Suburban Railway until its acquisition by New Jersey Public Service Transportation and the West Jersey Traction Company.

== Political career ==
Browning served for four years on the Camden city council and four years on the board of education. On June 18, 1889, President Benjamin Harrison appointed him as postmaster for Camden. He served until June 1, 1894, when his successor was appointed.

=== United States House of Representatives ===
He was the chief clerk of the United States House of Representatives from 1895 to 1911. As clerk, he became acquainted with many of the leading politicians of the time, including Thomas Brackett Reed and William McKinley. When McKinley was assassinated in 1901, Browning accompanied his body to the grave and took part in memorial services.

Browning resigned as clerk in 1911, when he was elected to complete the unexpired term of Henry C. Loudenslager, representing New Jersey's first congressional district. He was re-elected to several terms in office; in 1912, he was the only Republican elected to represent New Jersey in its congressional delegation. As a representative, Browning served on the House Committee on Naval Affairs and was a consistent advocate for naval expansion. He played a part in securing a $536 million appropriation for a more efficient and larger navy during the 64th Congress. He also secured passage of a $79,000 appropriation for dredging the Delaware River at Camden, but the bill was blocked in the Senate by the filibuster over an "armed neutrality" resolution on World War I.

== Personal life and death ==
Browning married Lillie Taylor, the daughter of a local Baptist minister, on December 30, 1873 in Camden. Their son, W. Kempton Browning, was physician and a captain in the New Jersey National Guard.

Browning served in the National Guard for twenty years, retiring with a rank of major. Browning was a member of the Young Men's Christian Association of Camden, the Gloucester County Historical Society, the Camden Board of Trade, the Union League of Philadelphia, the New Jersey Society of Pennsylvania, the Freemasons, the Knights Templar, the Shriners, and the Elks.

=== Death and burial ===
Browning died in the Capitol Building, Washington, D.C. on March 24, 1920. He was interred in Harleigh Cemetery.

== See also ==
- List of members of the United States Congress who died in office (1900–1949)

U.S. House of Representatives
Preceded by Henry C. Loudenslager	Member of the U.S. House of Representatives from New Jersey's 1st congressional district November 7, 1911 – March 24, 1920	Succeeded by Francis F. Patterson
