= Economic Recovery and Middle-Class Tax Relief Act of 2009 =

The Economic Recovery and Middle-Class Tax Relief Act of 2009 H.R. 470 is a bill introduced to the United States House of Representatives during the 111th congress on January 13, 2009. The bill was sponsored by Representative Scott Garrett of New Jersey along with 80 co-sponsors. The bill is a product of a conservative house caucus, the 100-plus member House Republican Study Committee (RSC), chaired by Rep. Tom Price of Georgia.

== Purposes ==
The bill was a counter-proposal to the American Recovery and Reinvestment Act of 2009 introduced by President Barack Obama. HR 470 proposes to stimulate the economy without new government spending by implementing a permanent five-percentage point income tax cut for all taxpayers; it also would make permanent current capital gains and dividend tax rates at 15% (current law will allowing rates to rise after 2010). The bill proposes to index capital gains for inflation, and reduce the corporate tax rate to 25% from 35%, and repeal the Alternative Minimum Tax for individuals. The bill proposes a one-percent reduction in all non-defense discretionary spending for the fiscal year ending in 2009.

Representative Price of Georgia, the RSC chair, described the Democratic proposal, the American Recovery and Reinvestment Act of 2009, as "the non-stimulus plan" and claimed it "simply won't work" because it has no market incentives to create jobs. The bill has been endorsed by Americans for Tax Reform, the National Taxpayers Union, Citizens Against Government Waste, FreedomWorks, the Small Business & Entrepreneurship Council, and the American Conservative Union.

The bill is acknowledged by Price as having zero chance of becoming law. Price indicated that Republicans "have a responsibility to provide a coherent and positive contrast" to the Democrats' plans for bigger government.
