= Charles A. Wolverton =

American politician (1880–1969)

Charles Anderson Wolverton
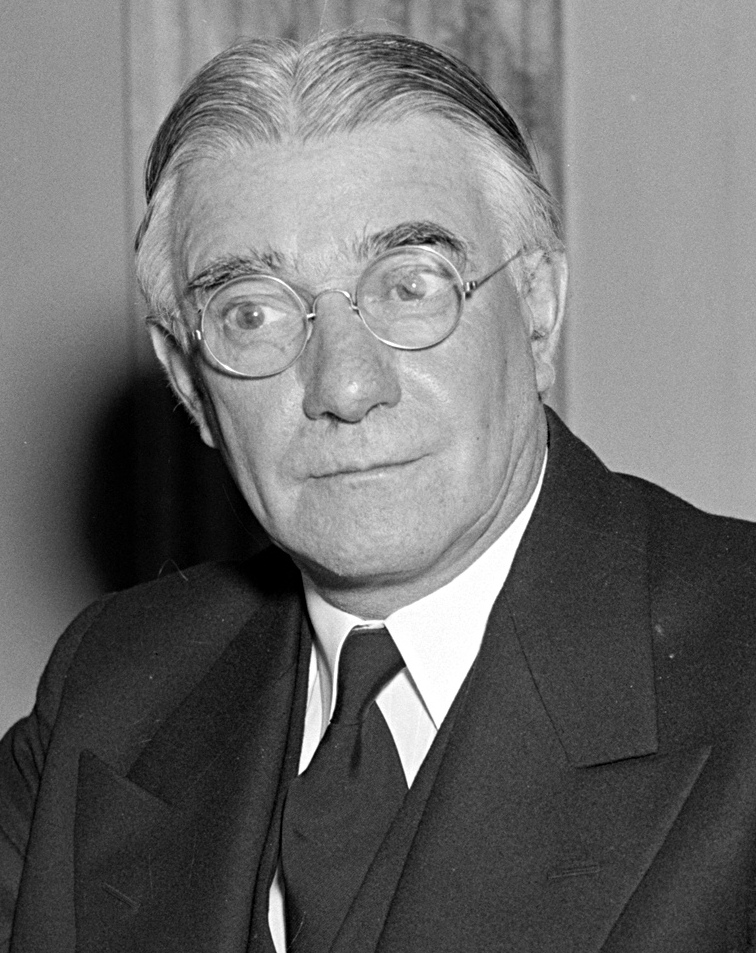

Member of the U.S. House of Representatives from New Jersey's 1st district
- In office March 4, 1927 – January 3, 1959
- Preceded by: Francis F. Patterson, Jr.
- Succeeded by: William T. Cahill
House positions
Chair of the House Committee on Interstate and Foreign Commerce
In office January 3, 1953 – January 3, 1955
Preceded by	Robert Crosser
Succeeded by	J. Percy Priest
In office January 3, 1947 – January 3, 1949
Preceded by	Clarence F. Lea
Succeeded by	Robert Crosser
Member of the Herter Committee
In office 1947–1948
Ranking Member of the House Committee on Interstate and Foreign Commerce
In office January 3, 1955 – January 3, 1959
Preceded by	Robert Crosser
Succeeded by	John B. Bennett
In office January 3, 1949 – January 3, 1953
Preceded by	Clarence F. Lea
Succeeded by	Robert Crosser
In office January 3, 1941 – January 3, 1947
Preceded by	Carl E. Mapes
Succeeded by	Clarence F. Lea

Prosecutor of Pleas for Camden County
- In office 1918–1923

Speaker of the New Jersey General Assembly
- In office 1918
- Preceded by: Edward Schoen
- Succeeded by: Arthur N. Pierson

Member of the New Jersey General Assembly from Camden County, New Jersey
- In office 1915–1918
- Preceded by: Henry S. Scovel
- Succeeded by: Ralph N. Kellam

Prosecutor of Camden County
- In office 1906–1913

Personal details
- Born: October 24, 1880 Camden, New Jersey, U.S.
- Died: May 16, 1969 (aged 88) Camden, New Jersey, U.S.
- Resting place: Harleigh Cemetery, Camden; 39.92390°N 75.09000°W
- Party: Republican
- Education: Camden High School
- Alma mater: University of Pennsylvania

Charles Anderson Wolverton (October 24, 1880 – May 16, 1969) was a Republican Party politician who represented New Jersey's 1st congressional district in the United States House of Representatives for nearly 32 years, from 1927 to 1959.

== Career ==
Born in Camden, New Jersey, Wolverton graduated from Camden High School in 1897 and receiving a law degree from the University of Pennsylvania in 1900, began practicing law in his native Camden. He was Camden County prosecutor from 1906 to 1913 and special assistant attorney general of New Jersey in 1913 and 1914.

Wolverton was then elected to the New Jersey State House of Assembly (1915–1918) becoming speaker in 1918. Wolverton first ran for a Congressional seat in 1926, winning that election and eventually serving 16 terms as a representative.

Wolverton eventually became chairman of the influential Interstate and Foreign Commerce Committee. During his tenure in the US House Wolverton crossed the aisle, voting for a number of FDR's New Deal programs. In 1933 he voted for the National Industrial Recovery Act. In 1935 he voted for the Social Security Act. In 1947–48, he served on the Herter Committee. Wolverton voted in favor of the Civil Rights Act of 1957.

A resident of Merchantville, New Jersey, Wolverton retired from political office in 1958 to resume his legal practice.

== Death ==
Charles A. Wolverton died at age 88 and was interred in Harleigh Cemetery in Camden.

== Electoral history ==
=== United States House of Representatives ===
United States House elections, 1952
Party	Candidate	Votes	%
Republican	Charles A. Wolverton (incumbent)	118,367	55.04
Democratic	Alfred R. Pierce	96,162	44.71
Progressive	Kent A. Smitheman	529	0.25
Total votes		215,058	100

United States House elections, 1946
Party	Candidate	Votes	%
Republican	Charles A. Wolverton (incumbent)	82,919	63.52
Democratic	George F. Neutze	47,631	36.48
Total votes		130,550	100

United States House elections, 1928
Party	Candidate	Votes	%
Republican	Charles Anderson Wolverton (incumbent)	109,510	74.86
Democratic	Alfred R. White	36,778	25.14
Total votes		146,288	100

U.S. House of Representatives
Preceded by Francis F. Patterson, Jr.	U.S. House of Representatives; 1st District of New Jersey; March 4, 1927 – January 3, 1959	Succeeded by William T. Cahill
Political offices
Preceded by Edward Schoen	Speaker of the New Jersey General Assembly; 1918	Succeeded by Arthur N. Pierson
