= Francis F. Patterson Jr. =

American politician (1867–1935)

Francis F. Patterson, Jr.
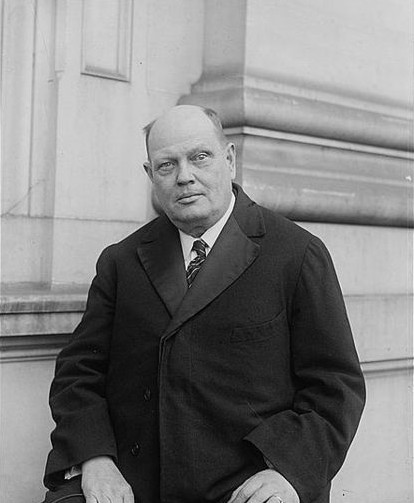

Member of the U.S. House of Representatives from New Jersey's 1st district
- In office November 2, 1920 – March 3, 1927
- Preceded by: William J. Browning
- Succeeded by: Charles A. Wolverton

Member of the New Jersey General Assembly
- In office 1900

Camden County Clerk
- In office 1900–1920

Personal details
- Born: Francis Ford Patterson Jr. July 30, 1867 Newark, New Jersey, U.S.
- Died: November 30, 1935 (aged 68) Merchantville, New Jersey, U.S.
- Resting place: Colestown Cemetery
- Party: Republican

Francis Ford Patterson Jr. (July 30, 1867 – November 30, 1935) was an American Republican Party politician who represented New Jersey's 1st congressional district in the United States House of Representatives from 1920 to 1927.

== Biography ==
Patterson was born in Newark, the son of Abigail Derrickson (Null) and Francis Ford Patterson. He moved with his parents to Woodbury, in 1874, where he attended the public schools. Patterson was employed in a newspaper office at the age of 13, and moved to Camden, in 1882.

=== Career ===
Patterson was connected with the Camden Courier from 1883 to 1890, was editor of The Philadelphia Record 1890–1894, and was owner and publisher of the Camden Post-Telegram from 1894 to 1923. He served as president of the West Jersey Trust Co. 1916–1925, and as director of the West Jersey Title Co. 1920–1925. He served as member of the New Jersey General Assembly in 1900, and was County clerk of Camden County from 1900 to 1920. He served as delegate to the 1920 Republican National Convention.

=== Congress ===
Patterson was elected as a Republican to the Sixty-sixth Congress to fill the vacancy caused by the death of William J. Browning. He was reelected to the Sixty-seventh, Sixty-eighth, and Sixty-ninth Congresses and served from November 2, 1920, to March 3, 1927, but was an unsuccessful candidate for renomination in 1926.

=== Later career and death ===
After leaving Congress, he engaged in banking, serving as president of the West Jersey Parkside Trust Co., of Camden, until his death at his home in Merchantville, on November 30, 1935.

He was interred in Colestown Cemetery, in what is now Cherry Hill, New Jersey.

=== Family ===
His great-grandson is actor Scott Patterson.

U.S. House of Representatives
Preceded by William J. Browning	Member of the U.S. House of Representatives from New Jersey's 1st congressional district November 2, 1920 – March 3, 1927	Succeeded by Charles A. Wolverton
