= Henry C. Loudenslager =

American politician (1852–1911)

Henry Clay Loudenslager
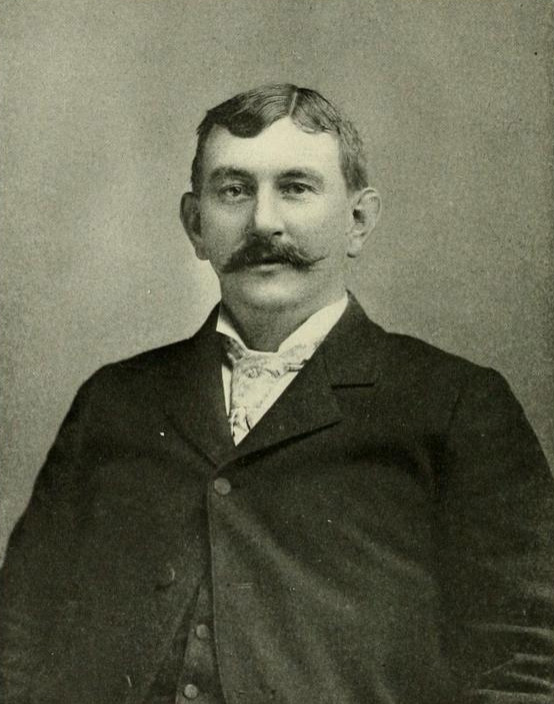

Member of the U.S. House of Representatives from New Jersey's 1st district
- In office March 4, 1893 – August 12, 1911
- Preceded by: Christopher A. Bergen
- Succeeded by: William J. Browning
House positions
Chair of the House Committee on Pensions
In office March 4, 1895 – March 4, 1911
Preceded by	Charles L. Moses
Succeeded by	William N. Richardson

Gloucester County Clerk
- In office 1882–1892

Personal details
- Born: May 22, 1852 Mauricetown, New Jersey, U.S.
- Died: August 12, 1911 (aged 59) Paulsboro, New Jersey, U.S.
- Resting place: Eglington Cemetery, Clarksboro
- Party: Republican

Henry Clay Loudenslager (May 22, 1852 – August 12, 1911) was an American Republican Party politician from New Jersey who represented the 1st congressional district from 1893 to 1911.

== Biography ==
Loudenslager was born in Mauricetown, New Jersey (now part of Commercial Township) on May 22, 1852. He moved with his parents to Paulsboro, New Jersey in 1856, where he attended the common schools. He engaged in the produce commission business in Philadelphia from 1872 to 1882, and was county clerk of Gloucester County, New Jersey from 1882 to 1892.

Loudenslager was elected as a Republican to the Fifty-third and to the nine succeeding Congresses and served from March 4, 1893, until his death in Paulsboro on August 12, 1911. He was chairman of the Committee on Pensions (Fifty-fourth through Sixty-first Congresses). He was interred in Eglington Cemetery in Clarksboro.

== See also ==
- List of members of the United States Congress who died in office (1900–1949)

== Notes ==
U.S. House of Representatives
Preceded by Christopher A. Bergen	Member of the U.S. House of Representatives from New Jersey's 1st congressional district March 4, 1893–August 12, 1911	Succeeded by William J. Browning
