= Arthur N. Pierson =

American businessman and politician

Arthur Newton Pierson (June 23, 1867 – March 8, 1957) was an American businessman and Republican Party politician who served as Speaker of the New Jersey General Assembly and President of the New Jersey Senate.

== Biography ==
Pierson was born in Westfield, New Jersey to James Topping and Catherine C. (Clark) Pierson. He was educated in Westfield public schools and attended the Pingry School from 1882 to 1885. In 1895 he entered the building supply business in East Orange and later was engaged in the wholesale business of clay products in New York City. He married Sadie Fowler, daughter of Robert A. and Elizabeth Fowler, in New York City on March 14, 1899. They had four children.

In 1903, Pierson was elected to the Westfield Town Council. He was elected President of the Board of Trade of Westfield in 1912, serving until 1916. In 1914, he was elected from Union County to the New Jersey General Assembly as a Republican, and served from 1915 to 1919. He was selected majority leader in the Assembly in 1918. In 1919, when there were thirty Republicans and thirty Democrats in the Assembly, he was chosen as Speaker after his name was picked from a hat.

In 1919 he was named a member of the bi-state commission that created the Port Authority of New York and New Jersey. Pierson was elected to the New Jersey Senate in 1923. He was Republican majority leader in 1929 and Senate President in 1930. He served as Acting Governor of New Jersey for two weeks during the absence of Governor Morgan Foster Larson. Pierson served as chairman of the New Jersey Regional Planning Commission in 1931 and 1932.

He served three terms in the Senate, until he was defeated for reelection in 1932.

Pierson served as Union County treasurer from 1934 until his retirement in 1955. In 1957 he died at Muhlenberg Hospital in Plainfield at the age of 89.

Political offices
| Preceded by Charles A. Wolverton | Speaker of the New Jersey General Assembly; 1919 | Succeeded by W. Irving Glover |
| Preceded by Thomas A. Mathis | President of the New Jersey Senate; 1930 | Succeeded by Joseph G. Wolber |
