= Scott Garrett =

American politician (born 1959)

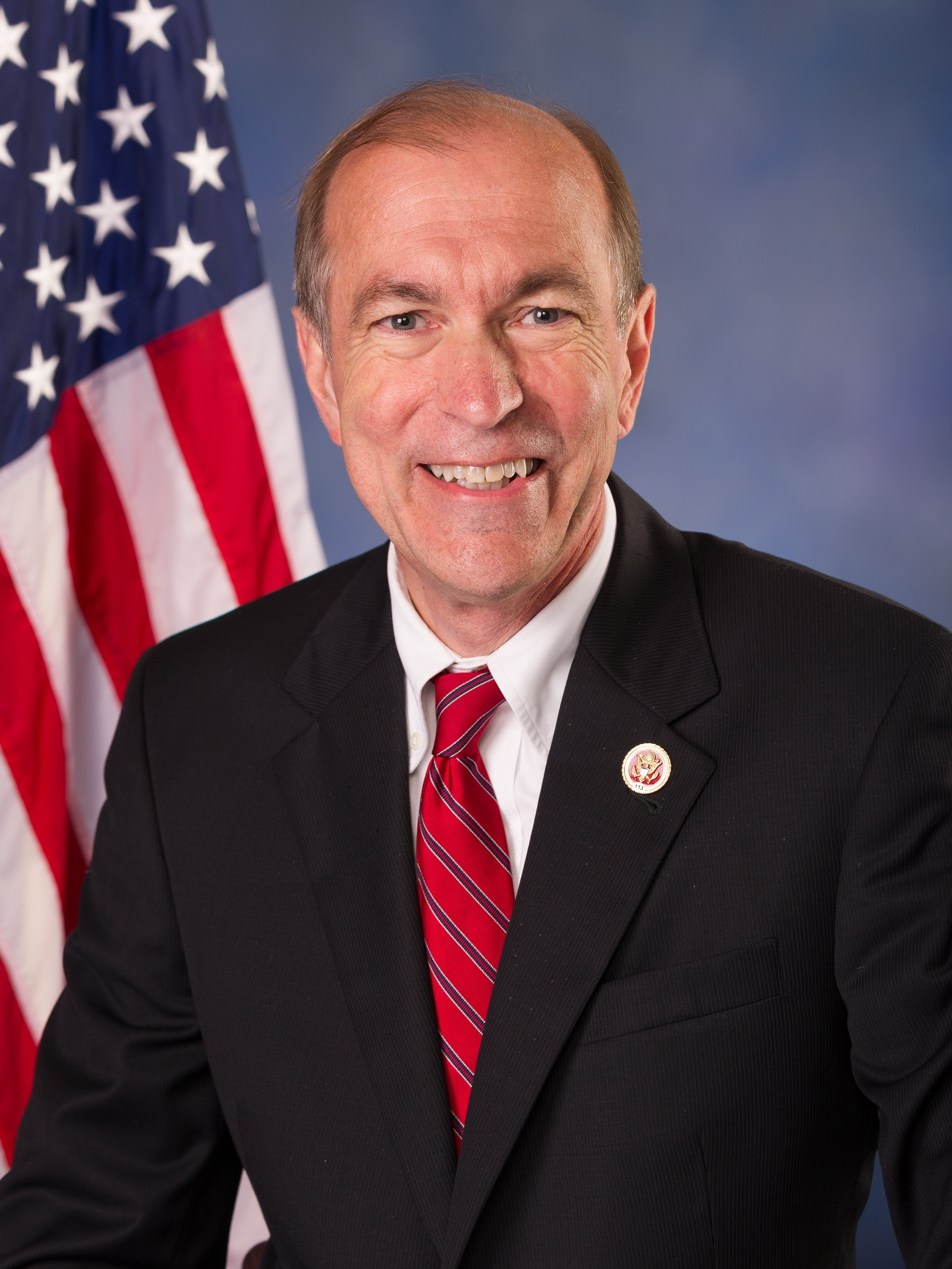

Member of the U.S. House of Representatives from New Jersey's 5th district
- In office January 3, 2003 – January 3, 2017
- Preceded by: Marge Roukema
- Succeeded by: Josh Gottheimer

Member of the New Jersey General Assembly from the 24th district
- In office November 19, 1990 – January 3, 2003
- Preceded by: Robert E. Littell
- Succeeded by: Alison Littell McHose

Personal details
- Born: Ernest Scott Garrett; July 9, 1959 (age 67) Englewood, New Jersey, U.S.
- Party: Republican
- Spouse: Mary Ellen Garrett
- Children: 2
- Education: Montclair State University (BA); Rutgers University, Camden (JD)

Ernest Scott Garrett (born July 9, 1959) is an American politician who was the U.S. representative for New Jersey's 5th congressional district, serving from 2003 to 2017. He is a member of the Republican Party. He previously served in the New Jersey General Assembly from 1990 to 2003. Garrett chaired the United States House Financial Services Subcommittee on Capital Markets and Government-Sponsored Enterprises. He lost his reelection bid in 2016 to Democrat Josh Gottheimer, becoming the only incumbent Congressman in New Jersey to be defeated that year.

On June 19, 2017, President Donald Trump nominated Garrett to become chairman and president of the Export–Import Bank of the United States, a post that requires confirmation by the United States Senate. In a 10–13 vote on December 19, 2017, the Senate Banking Committee declined to advance his nomination. Garrett was subsequently hired into an excepted service position at the U.S. Securities and Exchange Commission's Office of General Counsel.

== Early life, education and career ==
Garrett earned a Bachelor of Arts degree in political science from Montclair State College in 1981 and a Juris Doctor from Rutgers Law School in 1984.

Born in Bergen County in the town of Englewood, Garrett spent much of his life living in North Jersey. He was elected to the New Jersey General Assembly in 1991, and was re-elected five times, serving from 1992 to 2003, representing the 24th legislative district, which covered all of Sussex County and several municipalities in Morris and Hunterdon counties.

== U.S. House of Representatives ==
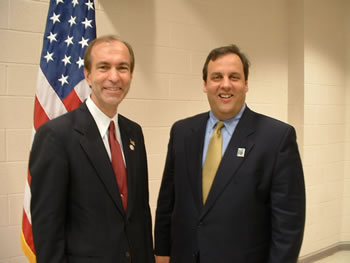
Garrett with Chris Christie in 2004

=== Elections ===
Garrett unsuccessfully challenged incumbent Congresswoman Marge Roukema in the 1998 and 2000 Republican primaries, on both occasions running well to the right of Roukema, a leading moderate Republican. In 2002, Roukema retired and Garrett won a contested five-way primary with 46% of the vote over State Assemblyman David C. Russo and State Senator Gerald Cardinale. Of the three major candidates, Garrett was the only one from the more rural western portion of the district, while Russo and Cardinale were both from Bergen County. Although Bergen was the most populous county in the district, Russo and Cardinale split the vote there, while Garrett dominated his base in the western portion of the district.

In the 2002 general election, Garrett faced Democratic candidate Anne Sumers, an ophthalmologist and former Republican. Garrett beat Sumers with 60% of the vote.

Garrett was reelected in 2004 with 58% of the vote. In 2006, Garrett defeated Republican primary opponent Michael Cino. In the November 2006 general election, Garrett defeated Paul Aronsohn, a former employee of the U.S. State Department during the Clinton Administration, to win a third term. Garrett defeated Democrat Dennis Shulman 56%–42% in the 2008 general election. In 2010, Garrett defeated Tod Theise, receiving 65% of the vote. In 2012, Garrett defeated Democrat Adam Gussen with 55% of the vote.

In 2014, Garrett defeated Democratic nominee Roy Cho with 55% of the vote.

Redistricting after the 2010 census made the 5th slightly more Democratic, as it gained heavily Democratic Hackensack and Teaneck. John McCain carried the old 5th with 54 percent of the vote in 2008, but would have only won the new 5th with 50.5 percent of the vote.

==== 2016 ====
Garrett ran for re-election in 2016 as the Republican candidate, besting Michael Cino and Peter Vallorosi in the primary. He faced former Clinton administration speechwriter Josh Gottheimer, who was unopposed in the Democratic primary. In an article published by OpenSecrets, Garrett was revealed to be heavily reliant on the financial sector to fund his campaign. In 2015, it was reported that Garrett stated he would not pay dues to the NRCC because they had supported openly gay candidates. Gottheimer and national Democratic groups used these comments to attack Garrett as too socially conservative for the district, while Wall Street firms that had donated to Garrett for years reduced their contributions.

Gottheimer won the general election on November 8, 2016, with 50.5% of the vote to Garrett's 47.2%. While Garrett carried three of the four counties in the district, he could not overcome a 33,800-vote deficit in the district's share of Bergen County; he lost overall by 14,900 votes.

=== Committee assignments ===
- Committee on the Budget
- Committee on Financial Services
  - Subcommittee on Capital Markets and Government-Sponsored Enterprises (chairman)
  - Subcommittee on Insurance, Housing and Community Opportunity

=== Caucus memberships ===
- Congressional Constitution Caucus (chairman)

=== Legislation ===
On May 8, 2013, Garrett introduced the Budget and Accounting Transparency Act of 2014 (H.R. 1872; 113th Congress), a bill that would modify the budgetary treatment of federal credit programs. The bill would require that the cost of direct loans or loan guarantees be recognized in the federal budget on a fair-value basis using guidelines set forth by the Financial Accounting Standards Board. The bill would also require the federal budget to reflect the net impact of programs administered by Fannie Mae and Freddie Mac. The changes made by the bill would mean that Fannie Mae and Freddie Mac were counted on the budget instead of considered separately and would mean that the debt of those two programs would be included in the national debt. These programs themselves would not be changed, but how they are accounted for in the United States federal budget would be. The goal of the bill is to improve the accuracy of how some programs are accounted for in the federal budget.

== Tenure ==
Garrett compiled an unshakably conservative voting record. This was unusual for New Jersey, historically a bastion of moderate Republicanism. He held a lifetime rating of 99.3 from the American Conservative Union, making him easily the most conservative member of the New Jersey delegation. He was one of the most conservative lawmakers ever to represent New Jersey in Congress, and was considered one of the most conservative members of the House. While in Congress, he founded and led the House Constitution Caucus.

During his time in Congress, Garrett was a member of the Liberty Caucus. He was a founding member of the Freedom Caucus, which serves as a policy alternative to the Republican Study Committee, and is the only New Jersey representative to have been a member of the Freedom Caucus.

=== Foreign policy ===
In 2007, Garrett led nineteen U.S. lawmakers to introduce a bill in the House of Representatives backing United Nations membership for Taiwan.

=== Economic policy ===
In 2006, Garrett supported H.R. 4411, the Goodlatte-Leach Unlawful Internet Gambling Enforcement Act.

Garrett voted to allow oil and gas drilling off the shore of New Jersey. He voted against making "price gouging" by oil companies a crime, and against the Further Emergency Supplemental Appropriations for Hurricane Katrina Act of 2005. He was one of four members of the House of Representatives to vote against an extension of unemployment benefits.

Garrett voted against the Continuing Appropriations Act, 2014 during the United States federal government shutdown of 2013. When opponents criticized Garrett for not signing a letter urging the House to provide prompt aid to victims of Hurricane Sandy, Garrett responded by saying he had signed nine other letters seeking aid and had helped sponsor a final bill authorizing money.

=== Education ===
As a state legislator in 2005, he proposed public schools include lessons on intelligent design alongside evolution. Garrett said he would not advocate for a law mandating changes to the state curriculum.

In July 2007, Garrett proposed an amendment to strike earmarked money in a spending bill for native Alaskan and Hawaiian educational programs. Congressman Don Young of Alaska defended the funds on the floor of the House, saying, "You want my money, my money." Young went on to suggest that Republicans had lost their majority in the 2006 election because some Republicans had challenged spending earmarks. While Garrett did not ask for an official reprimand, other conservative Republicans took exception to Young's remarks that the funds in question represented his money. Members of the Republican Study Committee gave Garrett a standing ovation later in the day during the group's weekly meeting.

=== LGBT rights ===
Following the legalization of same-sex marriage in the United States by the Supreme Court of the United States in 2015, Garrett supported the First Amendment Defense Act, a bill allowing companies to deny service to same-sex weddings due to religious objections.

Also in 2015, Garrett refused to pay GOP campaign arm dues to the National Republican Congressional Committee because he said they were "actively recruiting homosexual candidates and had supported gay candidates in the past." Garrett later clarified his remarks, saying that he is opposed to same-sex marriage due to his faith, but that he does not "have malice" toward any group of people. Regarding his stance opposing gay Republican political candidates, he said that political opponents in the media distorted his views; while he affirmed that it was "everybody's right" to run for office, he reiterated his opposition to funding the campaigns of candidates who support same-sex marriage.

=== Suffrage ===
In 2006, Garrett was the only congressman from New Jersey to vote against the reauthorization of the Voting Rights Act, citing his opposition to requirements to print non-English ballots.

== Export-Import Bank nomination ==
On April 14, 2017, President Donald Trump announced that he would nominate Garrett to become chairman and president of the Export–Import Bank of the United States. While in the House of Representatives, Garrett was a critic of the bank's existence. On June 19, 2017, Trump formally nominated Garrett to the post, which requires confirmation by the United States Senate.

Senator Sherrod Brown, the ranking member of the Senate Banking Committee, was surprised by the nomination, saying that he had been led to believe that Trump would not go ahead with choosing Garrett in light of the opposition. Brown predicted that no Democrats would vote for Garrett, and that some Republicans would also be "unhappy with [the nomination]."

The nomination drew opposition from a number of national business organizations, such as the Aerospace Industries Association, the National Association of Manufacturers, and the Business Roundtable. Senator Lindsey Graham of South Carolina was one of the Republicans reported to have concerns with the nomination. The South Carolina Chamber of Commerce opposed Garrett, and Graham said he would "try to get the administration to give us a better nominee." The New Jersey Business and Industry Association, the largest business group in Garrett's home state, called on him to withdraw from consideration for the post.

In August 2017, Politico reported that Trump would give Garrett a chance to rescue his nomination after privately questioning whether the nomination should proceed. Conservatives opposed to the Ex-Im Bank "have ratcheted up pressure on the administration to stick with Garrett’s nomination." Republican U.S. Senator Pat Toomey said: "I can tell you there will be Republican senators including myself who will put up quite a fight if his nomination doesn't go forward."

On December 19, 2017, the Senate Banking Committee voted by a margin of 10-13 not to advance Garrett's nomination to the full U.S. Senate. Republican U.S. Senators Mike Rounds and Tim Scott joined all of the Democrats on the committee in voting against Garrett. Trump did not formally withdraw the nomination; rather it was returned to Trump unconfirmed on January 3, 2018, under Standing Rules of the United States Senate, Rule XXXI, paragraph 6.

== Personal life ==
Garrett is married and has two adult daughters. They homeschooled their daughters because there was "no high school offering a Christian education" in their area.

== Electoral history ==
New Jersey's 5th congressional district: Results 2002–2010
Year	Democratic	Votes	Pct	Republican	Votes	Pct	3rd Party	Party	Votes	Pct	3rd Party	Party	Votes	Pct	
2002	Anne Sumers	76,504	38%	Scott Garrett	118,881	59%	Michael J. Cino	Lower Tax Independent	4,466	2%					
2004	D. Anne Wolfe	122,259	41%	Scott Garrett	171,220	58%	Victor Kaplan	Libertarian	1,857	1%	Thomas Phelan	NJ Conservative	1,515	1%	*
2006	Paul Aronsohn	89,503	44%	Scott Garrett	112,142	55%	R. Matthew Fretz	An Independent Voice	2,597	1%					
2008	Dennis Shulman	123,512	42%	Scott Garrett	165,271	56%	Ed Fanning	Green	4,950	2%					
2010	Tod Theise	60,045	33%	Scott Garrett	119,478	65%	Ed Fanning	Green	2,262	1%	Mark Quick	Independent	1,646	<1%	
2012	Adam Gussen	130,102	43%	Scott Garrett	167,503	55%	Patricia Alessandrini	Green	6,770	2%					
2014	Roy Cho	81,808	43%	Scott Garrett	104,678	55%	Mark Quick	Independent	2,435	1%					
2016	Josh Gottheimer	158,045	50.43%	Scott Garrett	148,398	47.35%	Claudio Belusic	Libertarian	6,890	2.2%					

*Write-in and minor candidate notes: In 2004, Socialist Party USA candidate Gregory Pason received 574 votes. In 2010, James Radigan received 336 votes.

== See also ==
- Economic Recovery and Middle-Class Tax Relief Act of 2009

U.S. House of Representatives
Preceded by Marge Roukema	Member of the U.S. House of Representatives from New Jersey's 5th congressional district 2003–2017	Succeeded by Josh Gottheimer
U.S. order of precedence (ceremonial)
Preceded by Phil English as Former U.S. Representative	Order of precedence of the United States as Former U.S. Representative	Succeeded by Cynthia McKinney as Former U.S. Representative
