= New Jersey's 1st congressional district =

U.S. House district for New Jersey

Coordinates: 39.8881°N 75.0625°W

- Interactive map of district boundaries since January 3, 2023
- Representative: Donald Norcross; D–Camden
- Distribution: 98.2% urban; 1.8% rural
- Population (2025): 786,505
- Median household income: $95,438
- Ethnicity: 59.5% White; 15.9% Black; 14.9% Hispanic; 5.3% Asian; 3.7% Two or more races; 0.6% other
- Cook PVI: D+10

New Jersey's 1st congressional district is a congressional district located in southern New Jersey, encompassing all of Camden County and parts of Gloucester County. The district, which includes the city of Camden and many South Jersey suburbs, has been represented by Democrat Donald Norcross since November 2014. The district has consistently elected Democratic representatives to represent them since 1975, in part from voters in Democratic-leaning Camden County's large influence in elections.

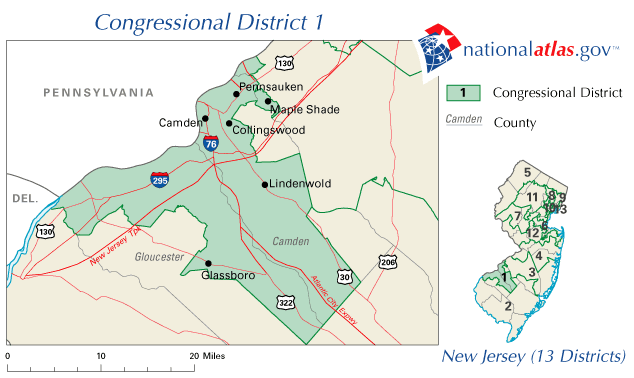
The district from 2003 to 2013

== Counties and municipalities in the district ==
For the 118th and successive Congresses, based on redistricting following the 2020 census, the district contains all or portions of three counties and 52 municipalities.

Burlington County (2)
Maple Shade Township, Palmyra

Camden County (36)
All 36 municipalities

Gloucester County (14)
Deptford Township, East Greenwich Township (part, also 2nd; includes Mount Royal and part of Mickleton), Glassboro, Mantua Township, Monroe Township, National Park, Paulsboro, Pitman, Washington Township, Wenonah, West Deptford Township, Westville, Woodbury Heights, Woodbury

== Recent election results from statewide races ==
Year	Office	Results
2008	President	Obama 64% - 35%
2012	President	Obama 65% - 35%
2016	President	Clinton 60% - 37%
2017	Governor	Murphy 64% - 34%
2018	Senate	Menendez 58% - 39%
2020	President	Biden 62% - 37%
2020	Senate	Booker 62% - 37%
2021	Governor	Murphy 57% - 42%
2024	President	Harris 59% - 40%
2024	Senate	Kim 61% - 37%
2025	Governor	Sherrill 63% - 36%

== List of members representing the district ==
=== 1789–1813: one seat ===
Member (Residence)	Party	Years	Cong ress	Electoral history
Seats had been elected at-large until 1799.
John Condit (Orange)	Democratic-Republican	March 4, 1799 – March 3, 1801	6th	Elected in 1798. Redistricted to the at-large district.
All seats elected at-large after 1801.

=== 1813–1815: two seats ===
From 1813 to 1815, two seats were apportioned, elected at-large on a general ticket.

Cong ress	Years	Seat A			Seat B		
Cong ress	Years	Member (Residence)	Party	Electoral history	Member (Residence)	Party	Electoral history
March 4, 1813 – March 3, 1815	13th	Lewis Condict (Morristown)	Democratic-Republican	Redistricted from the at-large district and re-elected in 1813. Redistricted to the at-large district.	Thomas Ward (Newark)	Democratic-Republican	Elected in 1813. Redistricted to the at-large district.

All seats elected at-large starting in 1815.

=== 1843–present: one seat ===
Seats had been elected at-large until 1843.

Member (Residence)	Party	Years	Cong ress	Electoral history	Counties/Towns
District re-established March 4, 1843
Lucius Q.C. Elmer (Bridgeton)	Democratic	March 4, 1843 – March 3, 1845	28th	Elected in 1842. Lost re-election.	Atlantic, Cape May, Cumberland, Gloucester, and Salem
James G. Hampton (Bridgeton)	Whig	March 4, 1845 – March 3, 1849	29th 30th	Elected in 1844. Re-elected in 1846. Retired.	Atlantic, Camden, Cape May, Cumberland, Gloucester, and Salem
Andrew K. Hay (Winslow)	Whig	March 4, 1849 – March 3, 1851	31st	Elected in 1848. Retired.	Atlantic, Camden, Cape May, Cumberland, Gloucester, and Salem
Nathan T. Stratton (Mullica Hill)	Democratic	March 4, 1851 – March 3, 1855	32nd 33rd	Elected in 1850. Re-elected in 1852. Retired.	Atlantic, Camden, Cape May, Cumberland, Gloucester, and Salem
Isaiah D. Clawson (Woodstown)	Opposition	March 4, 1855 – March 3, 1857	34th 35th	Elected in 1854. Re-elected in 1856. Retired.	Atlantic, Camden, Cape May, Cumberland, Gloucester, and Salem
Isaiah D. Clawson (Woodstown)	Republican	March 4, 1857 – March 3, 1859	34th 35th	Elected in 1854. Re-elected in 1856. Retired.	Atlantic, Camden, Cape May, Cumberland, Gloucester, and Salem
John T. Nixon (Bridgeton)	Republican	March 4, 1859 – March 3, 1863	36th 37th	Elected in 1858. Re-elected in 1860. Retired.	Atlantic, Camden, Cape May, Cumberland, Gloucester, and Salem
John F. Starr (Camden)	Republican	March 4, 1863 – March 3, 1867	38th 39th	Elected in 1862. Re-elected in 1864. Retired.	Atlantic, Camden, Cape May, Cumberland, Gloucester, and Salem
William Moore (Mays Landing)	Republican	March 4, 1867 – March 3, 1871	40th 41st	Elected in 1866. Re-elected in 1868. Lost renomination.	Atlantic, Camden, Cape May, Cumberland, Gloucester, and Salem
John W. Hazelton (Mullica Hill)	Republican	March 4, 1871 – March 3, 1875	42nd 43rd	Elected in 1870. Re-elected in 1872. Lost re-election.	Atlantic, Camden, Cape May, Cumberland, Gloucester, and Salem
John W. Hazelton (Mullica Hill)	Republican	March 4, 1871 – March 3, 1875	42nd 43rd	Elected in 1870. Re-elected in 1872. Lost re-election.	1873–1893: Camden, Cape May, Cumberland, Gloucester, and Salem
Clement H. Sinnickson (Salem)	Republican	March 4, 1875 – March 3, 1879	44th 45th	Elected in 1874. Re-elected in 1876. Retired.	1873–1893: Camden, Cape May, Cumberland, Gloucester, and Salem
George M. Robeson (Camden)	Republican	March 4, 1879 – March 3, 1883	46th 47th	Elected in 1878. Re-elected in 1880. Lost re-election.	1873–1893: Camden, Cape May, Cumberland, Gloucester, and Salem
Thomas M. Ferrell (Glassboro)	Democratic	March 4, 1883 – March 3, 1885	48th	Elected in 1882. Lost re-election.	1873–1893: Camden, Cape May, Cumberland, Gloucester, and Salem
George Hires (Salem)	Republican	March 4, 1885 – March 3, 1889	49th 50th	Elected in 1884. Re-elected in 1886. Retired.	1873–1893: Camden, Cape May, Cumberland, Gloucester, and Salem
Christopher A. Bergen (Camden)	Republican	March 4, 1889 – March 3, 1893	51st 52nd	Elected in 1888. Re-elected in 1890. Lost renomination.	1873–1893: Camden, Cape May, Cumberland, Gloucester, and Salem
Henry C. Loudenslager (Paulsboro)	Republican	March 4, 1893 – August 12, 1911	53rd 54th 55th 56th 57th 58th 59th 60th 61st 62nd	Elected in 1892. Re-elected in 1894. Re-elected in 1896. Re-elected in 1898. Re-elected in 1900. Re-elected in 1902. Re-elected in 1904. Re-elected in 1906. Re-elected in 1908. Re-elected in 1910. Died.	Camden, Gloucester, and Salem
Vacant		August 12, 1911 – November 7, 1911	62nd		Camden, Gloucester, and Salem
William J. Browning (Camden)	Republican	November 7, 1911 – March 24, 1920	62nd 63rd 64th 65th 66th	Elected to finish Loudenslager's term. Re-elected in 1912. Re-elected in 1914. Re-elected in 1916. Re-elected in 1918. Died.	Camden, Gloucester, and Salem
Vacant		March 24, 1920 – November 2, 1920	66th		Camden, Gloucester, and Salem
Francis F. Patterson (Camden)	Republican	November 2, 1920 – March 3, 1927	66th 67th 68th 69th	Elected to finish Browning's term. Also elected to the next full term. Re-elected in 1922. Re-elected in 1924. Lost renomination.	Camden, Gloucester, and Salem
Charles A. Wolverton (Merchantville)	Republican	March 4, 1927 – January 3, 1959	70th 71st 72nd 73rd 74th 75th 76th 77th 78th 79th 80th 81st 82nd 83rd 84th 85th	Elected in 1926. Re-elected in 1928. Re-elected in 1930. Re-elected in 1932. Re-elected in 1934. Re-elected in 1936. Re-elected in 1938. Re-elected in 1940. Re-elected in 1942. Re-elected in 1944. Re-elected in 1946. Re-elected in 1948. Re-elected in 1950. Re-elected in 1952. Re-elected in 1954. Re-elected in 1956. Retired.	Camden, Gloucester, and Salem
William T. Cahill (Collingswood)	Republican	January 3, 1959 – January 3, 1967	86th 87th 88th 89th	Elected in 1958. Re-elected in 1960. Re-elected in 1962. Re-elected in 1964. Redistricted to the 6th district.	Camden, Gloucester, and Salem
John E. Hunt (Pitman)	Republican	January 3, 1967 – January 3, 1975	90th 91st 92nd 93rd	Elected in 1966. Re-elected in 1968. Re-elected in 1970. Re-elected in 1972. Lost re-election.	1967–1973; Gloucester and parts of Camden County
John E. Hunt (Pitman)	Republican	January 3, 1967 – January 3, 1975	90th 91st 92nd 93rd	Elected in 1966. Re-elected in 1968. Re-elected in 1970. Re-elected in 1972. Lost re-election.	1973–1985; Gloucester and parts of Camden County
James Florio (Gloucester Township)	Democratic	January 3, 1975 – January 16, 1990	94th 95th 96th 97th 98th 99th 100th 101st	Elected in 1974. Re-elected in 1976. Re-elected in 1978. Re-elected in 1980. Re-elected in 1982. Re-elected in 1984. Re-elected in 1986. Re-elected in 1988. Resigned when elected governor.	1973–1985; Gloucester and parts of Camden County
James Florio (Gloucester Township)	Democratic	January 3, 1975 – January 16, 1990	94th 95th 96th 97th 98th 99th 100th 101st	Elected in 1974. Re-elected in 1976. Re-elected in 1978. Re-elected in 1980. Re-elected in 1982. Re-elected in 1984. Re-elected in 1986. Re-elected in 1988. Resigned when elected governor.	1985–1993; Parts of Burlington, Camden, and Gloucester
Vacant		January 16, 1990 – November 6, 1990	101st		1985–1993; Parts of Burlington, Camden, and Gloucester
Rob Andrews (Haddon Heights)	Democratic	November 6, 1990 – February 18, 2014	101st 102nd 103rd 104th 105th 106th 107th 108th 109th 110th 111th 112th 113th	Elected to finish Florio's term. Also elected to the next full term. Re-elected in 1992. Re-elected in 1994. Re-elected in 1996. Re-elected in 1998. Re-elected in 2000. Re-elected in 2002. Re-elected in 2004. Re-elected in 2006. Re-elected in 2008. Re-elected in 2010. Re-elected in 2012. Resigned due to House Ethics investigation.	1985–1993; Parts of Burlington, Camden, and Gloucester
Rob Andrews (Haddon Heights)	Democratic	November 6, 1990 – February 18, 2014	101st 102nd 103rd 104th 105th 106th 107th 108th 109th 110th 111th 112th 113th	Elected to finish Florio's term. Also elected to the next full term. Re-elected in 1992. Re-elected in 1994. Re-elected in 1996. Re-elected in 1998. Re-elected in 2000. Re-elected in 2002. Re-elected in 2004. Re-elected in 2006. Re-elected in 2008. Re-elected in 2010. Re-elected in 2012. Resigned due to House Ethics investigation.	1993–2003; Parts of Burlington, Camden, and Gloucester
Rob Andrews (Haddon Heights)	Democratic	November 6, 1990 – February 18, 2014	101st 102nd 103rd 104th 105th 106th 107th 108th 109th 110th 111th 112th 113th	Elected to finish Florio's term. Also elected to the next full term. Re-elected in 1992. Re-elected in 1994. Re-elected in 1996. Re-elected in 1998. Re-elected in 2000. Re-elected in 2002. Re-elected in 2004. Re-elected in 2006. Re-elected in 2008. Re-elected in 2010. Re-elected in 2012. Resigned due to House Ethics investigation.	2003–2013 Parts of Burlington (Maple Shade and Palmyra), Camden, and Gloucester
Rob Andrews (Haddon Heights)	Democratic	November 6, 1990 – February 18, 2014	101st 102nd 103rd 104th 105th 106th 107th 108th 109th 110th 111th 112th 113th	Elected to finish Florio's term. Also elected to the next full term. Re-elected in 1992. Re-elected in 1994. Re-elected in 1996. Re-elected in 1998. Re-elected in 2000. Re-elected in 2002. Re-elected in 2004. Re-elected in 2006. Re-elected in 2008. Re-elected in 2010. Re-elected in 2012. Resigned due to House Ethics investigation.	2013–2023 Parts of Burlington (Maple Shade and Palmyra), Camden, and Gloucester
Vacant		February 18, 2014 – November 12, 2014	113th		2013–2023 Parts of Burlington (Maple Shade and Palmyra), Camden, and Gloucester
Donald Norcross (Camden)	Democratic	November 12, 2014 – present	113th 114th 115th 116th 117th 118th 119th	Elected to finish Andrews's term. Elected to full term in 2014. Re-elected in 2016. Re-elected in 2018. Re-elected in 2020. Re-elected in 2022. Re-elected in 2024. Re-elected in 2026.	2013–2023 Parts of Burlington (Maple Shade and Palmyra), Camden, and Gloucester
Donald Norcross (Camden)	Democratic	November 12, 2014 – present	113th 114th 115th 116th 117th 118th 119th	Elected to finish Andrews's term. Elected to full term in 2014. Re-elected in 2016. Re-elected in 2018. Re-elected in 2020. Re-elected in 2022. Re-elected in 2024. Re-elected in 2026.	2023–present Camden, Parts of Burlington (Maple Shade and Palmyra) and Gloucester

== Recent election results ==
=== 2012 ===
New Jersey's 1st congressional district, 2012
Party	Candidate	Votes	%
Democratic	Rob Andrews (incumbent)	210,470	68.2
Republican	Gregory Horton	92,459	30.0
Green	John Reitter	4,413	1.4
Reform	Margaret Chapman	1,177	0.4
Total votes		308,519	100.0
Democratic hold			

=== 2014 ===
New Jersey's 1st congressional district, 2014
Party	Candidate	Votes	%
Democratic	Donald Norcross	93,315	57.4
Republican	Garry Cobb	64,073	39.4
Independent	Scot John Tomaszewski	1,784	1.1
Independent	Robert Shapiro	1,134	0.7
Independent	Margaret M. Chapman	1,103	0.7
Independent	Mike Berman	634	0.4
Independent	Donald E Letton	449	0.3
Total votes		162,492	100.0
Democratic hold			

=== 2016 ===
New Jersey's 1st congressional district, 2016
Party	Candidate	Votes	%
Democratic	Donald Norcross (incumbent)	183,231	60.0
Republican	Bob Patterson	112,388	36.8
Independent	Scot John Tomaszewski	5,473	1.8
Libertarian	William F. Sihr IV	2,410	0.8
Independent	Michael Berman	1,971	0.6
Total votes		305,473	100.0
Democratic hold			

=== 2018 ===
New Jersey's 1st congressional district, 2018
Party	Candidate	Votes	%
Democratic	Donald Norcross (incumbent)	169,628	64.4
Republican	Paul E. Dilks	87,617	33.3
Libertarian	Robert Shapiro	2,821	1.1
Independent	Paul Hamlin	2,368	0.9
Independent	Mohammad Kabir	984	0.4
Total votes		263,418	100.0
Democratic hold			

=== 2020 ===
New Jersey's 1st congressional district, 2020
Party	Candidate	Votes	%
Democratic	Donald Norcross (incumbent)	240,567	62.5
Republican	Claire Gustafson	144,463	37.5
Total votes		385,030	100.0
Democratic hold			

=== 2022 ===
New Jersey's 1st congressional district, 2022
Party	Candidate	Votes	%
Democratic	Donald Norcross (incumbent)	139,559	62.3
Republican	Claire Gustafson	78,794	35.2
Independent	Patricia Kline	3,343	1.5
Libertarian	Isaiah Fletcher	1,546	0.7
Independent	Allen Cannon	642	0.3
Total votes		223,884	100.0
Democratic hold			

=== 2024 ===
2024 New Jersey's 1st congressional district election
Party	Candidate	Votes	%
Democratic	Donald Norcross (incumbent)	208,808	57.8
Republican	Teddy Liddell	144,390	40.0
Green	Robin Brownfield	5,771	1.6
Independent	Austin Johnson	2,091	0.6
Total votes		361,060	100.0
Democratic hold			

== Sources ==
- Martis, Kenneth C. (1989). The Historical Atlas of Political Parties in the United States Congress. New York: Macmillan Publishing Company.
- Martis, Kenneth C. (1982). The Historical Atlas of United States Congressional Districts. New York: Macmillan Publishing Company.
- Congressional Biographical Directory of the United States 1774–present
