= 2006 United States House of Representatives elections in New Jersey =

- November 7, 2006

All 13 New Jersey seats to the United States House of Representatives
- Turnout: 48% (▼25pp)
	Majority party	Minority party
Party	Democratic	Republican
Last election	7	6
Seats won	7	6
Seat change	Steady	Steady
Popular vote	1,207,782	903,176
Percentage	56.52%	42.27%
Swing	▲4.11%	▼3.85%

Democratic hold
Republican hold
Democratic
50–60%
60–70%
70–80%
80–90%
90–100%
Republican
40–50%
50–60%
60–70%

The 2006 United States House of Representatives elections in New Jersey were held on November 4, 2006, to determine who will represent the state of New Jersey in the United States House of Representatives. New Jersey has thirteen seats in the House, apportioned according to the 2000 United States census. Representatives are elected for two-year terms.

== Overview ==
United States House of Representatives elections in New Jersey, 2006
Party	Votes	Percentage	Seats	+/–
Democratic	1,207,782	56.52%	7	Steady
Republican	903,176	42.27%	6	Steady
Libertarian	6,333	0.30%	0	Steady
Independents	19,549	0.91%	0	Steady
Totals	2,136,840	100.00%	13	—

== District 1 ==
2006 New Jersey's 1st congressional district election
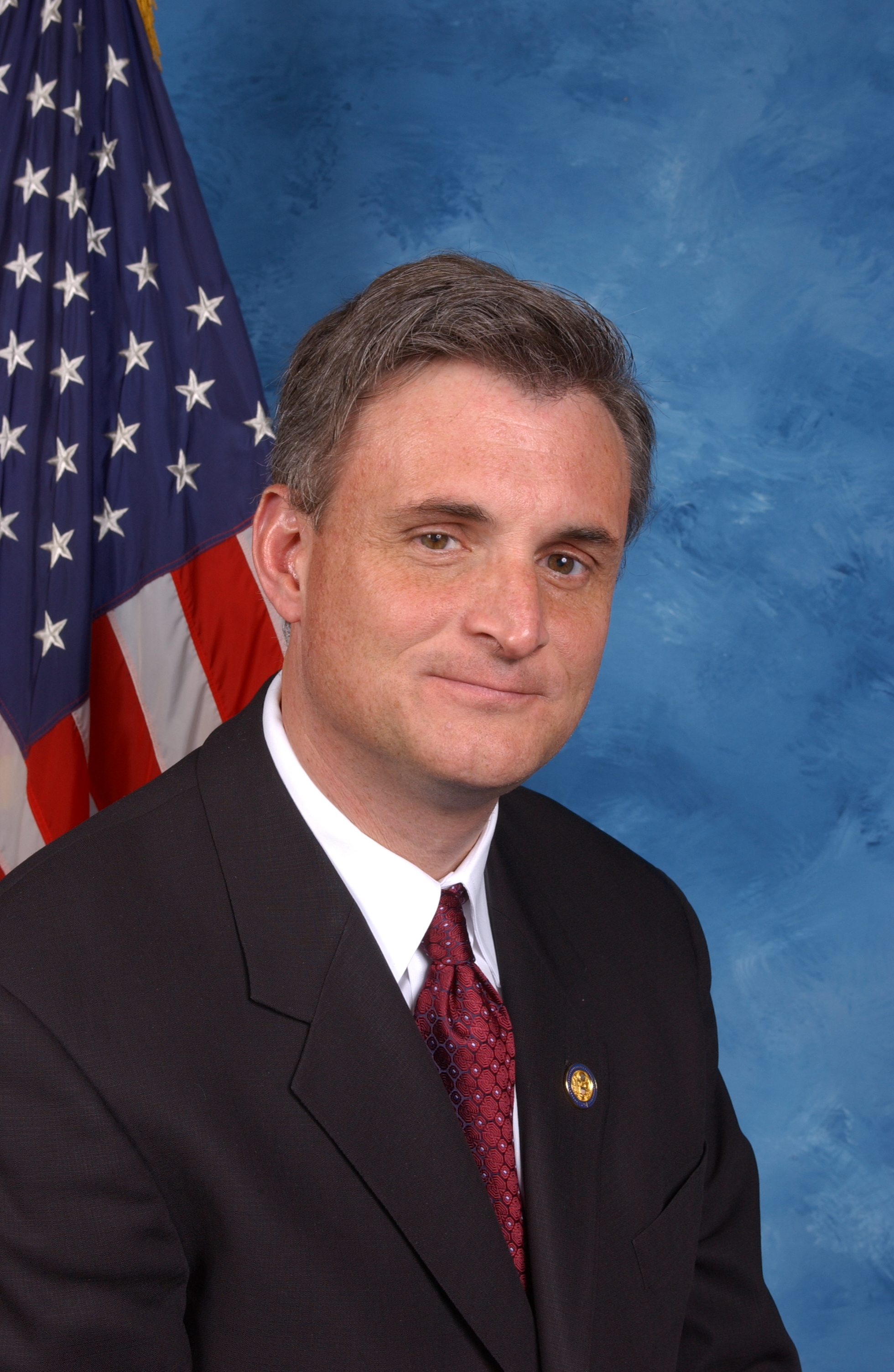
Nominee	Rob Andrews
Party	Democratic
Popular vote	140,110
Percentage	100.0%
U.S. Representative before election
Rob Andrews
Democratic
Elected U.S. Representative
incumbent
Democratic

Democrat Rob Andrews, the representative for this district since 1990, was re-elected with 75% of the vote in 2004. He won unopposed in 2006.

=== Democratic primary ===
==== Candidates ====
- Rob Andrews, incumbent Representative from Haddon Heights since 1990

==== Results ====
2006 Democratic U.S. House primary
Party	Candidate	Votes	%
Democratic	Rob Andrews (incumbent)	18,418	100.00%
Total votes		18,418	100.00%

=== General election ===
==== Candidates ====
- Rob Andrews, incumbent Representative from Haddon Heights since 1990 (Democratic)

==== Predictions ====
Source	Ranking	As of
The Cook Political Report	Safe D	November 6, 2006
Rothenberg	Safe D	November 6, 2006
Sabato's Crystal Ball	Safe D	November 6, 2006
Real Clear Politics	Safe D	November 7, 2006
CQ Politics	Safe D	November 7, 2006

==== Results ====
2006 U.S. House election
Party	Candidate	Votes	%	±%
Democratic	Rob Andrews (incumbent)	140,110	100.00%	▲25.00
Total votes		140,110	100.00%	

==== By county ====
County	Rob Andrews Democratic	
County	#	%
Burlington (part)	5,943	100.00%
Camden (part)	87,105	100.00%
Gloucester (part)	47,152	100.00%
Totals	140,100	100.00%

== District 2 ==
2006 New Jersey's 2nd congressional district election
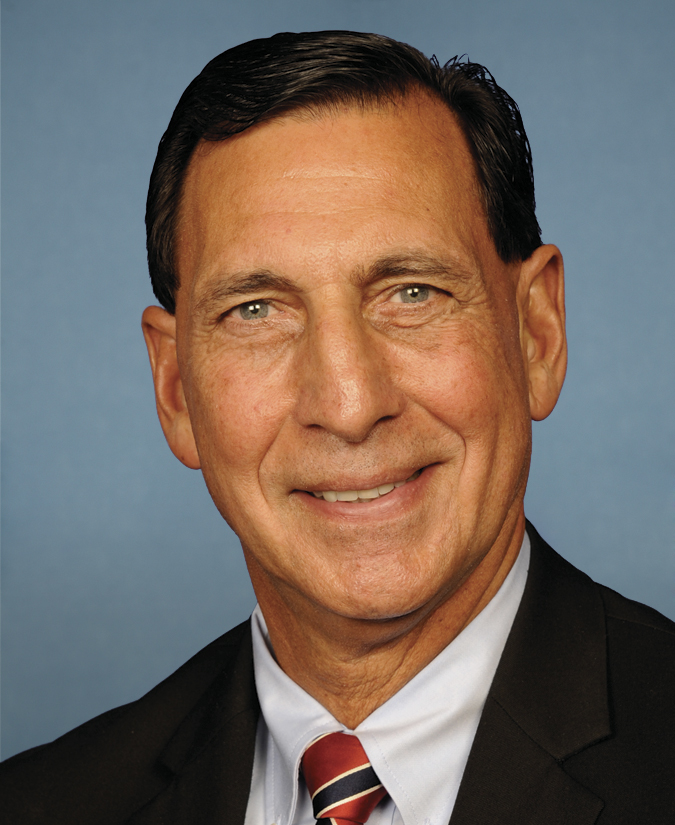

Nominee	Frank LoBiondo	Viola Thomas-Hughes
Party	Republican	Democratic
Popular vote	111,245	64,277
Percentage	61.6%	35.6%
- County results *: 50–60% 60–70%
U.S. Representative before election
Frank LoBiondo
Republican
Elected U.S. Representative
incumbent
Republican

Republican Frank A. LoBiondo, the representative for this district since 1995, was re-elected with 65.1% of the vote in 2004. He defeated Democrat Viola Thomas-Hughes in 2006.

=== Republican primary ===
==== Candidates ====
- Frank LoBiondo, incumbent Representative from Millville since 1995

==== Results ====
2006 Republican U.S. House primary
Party	Candidate	Votes	%
Republican	Frank LoBiondo (incumbent)	14,440	100.00%
Total votes		14,440	100.00%

=== Democratic primary ===
==== Candidates ====
- Henry David Marcus
- Viola Thomas-Hughes

==== Results ====
2006 Democratic U.S. House primary
Party	Candidate	Votes	%
Democratic	Viola Thomas-Hughes	8,268	82.92%
Democratic	Henry David Marcus	1,703	17.08%
Total votes		9,971	100.00%

=== General election ===
==== Candidates ====
- Thomas Fanslau (We The People)
- Frank LoBiondo, incumbent Representative from Millville since 1995 (Republican)
- Lynn Merle (A New Direction)
- Robert E. Mullock (Preserve Green Space)
- Willie Norwood (Socialist)
- Viola Thomas-Hughes (Democratic)

==== Predictions ====
Source	Ranking	As of
The Cook Political Report	Safe R	November 6, 2006
Rothenberg	Safe R	November 6, 2006
Sabato's Crystal Ball	Safe R	November 6, 2006
Real Clear Politics	Safe R	November 7, 2006
CQ Politics	Safe R	November 7, 2006

==== Results ====
2006 U.S. House election
Party	Candidate	Votes	%	±%
Republican	Frank LoBiondo (incumbent)	111,245	61.61%	▼3.48
Democratic	Viola Thomas-Hughes	64,277	35.60%	▲2.90
Independent	Robert E. Mullock	3,071	1.70%	N/A
Independent	Lynn Merle	992	0.55%	N/A
Independent	Thomas Fanslau	603	0.33%	N/A
Socialist	Willie Norwood	385	0.21%	N/A
Total votes		180,575	100.00%	

==== By county ====
County	Frank LoBiondo Republican		Viola Thomas-Hughes Democratic		Various candidates Other parties		Margin		Total votes cast
County	#	%	#	%	#	%	#	%	Total votes cast
Atlantic	39,839	59.7%	25,432	38.1%	1,492	2.2%	14,407	21.6%	66,763
Burlington (part)	1,405	67.2%	674	32.2%	13	0.6%	731	35.0%	2,092
Camden (part)	1,564	50.3%	1,503	48.3%	44	1.4%	61	2.0%	3,111
Cape May	22,353	66.1%	9,804	29.0%	1,666	4.9%	12,549	37.1%	33,823
Cumberland	18,631	60.9%	11,164	36.5%	800	2.6%	7,467	24.4%	30,595
Gloucester (part)	13,499	58.8%	8,977	39.1%	496	2.2%	4,522	19.7%	22,972
Salem	13,954	65.8%	6,725	31.7%	540	2.5%	7,229	34.1%	21,219
Totals	111,245	61.6%	64,227	35.6%	5,053	2.8%	46,968	26.0%	180,575

== District 3 ==
2006 New Jersey's 3rd congressional district election
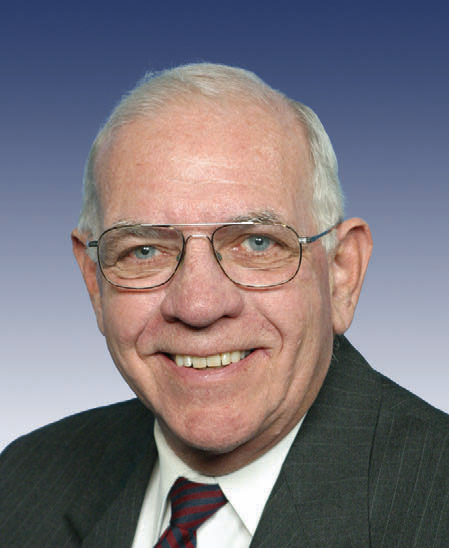

Nominee	Jim Saxton	Rich Sexton
Party	Republican	Democratic
Popular vote	122,559	86,113
Percentage	58.4%	41.0%
- County results *: 50–60% 60–70% Sexton: 50–60%
U.S. Representative before election
Jim Saxton
Republican
Elected U.S. Representative
incumbent
Republican

Incumbent Republican Jim Saxton defeated Democrat Rich Sexton. The district covers Burlington and Ocean counties.

=== Republican primary ===
==== Candidates ====
- Jim Saxton, incumbent Representative from Mount Holly since 1984

==== Results ====
2006 Republican U.S. House primary
Party	Candidate	Votes	%
Republican	Jim Saxton (incumbent)	16,228	100.00%
Total votes		16,228	100.00%

=== Democratic primary ===
==== Candidates ====
- Rich Sexton

==== Results ====
2006 Democratic U.S. House primary
Party	Candidate	Votes	%
Democratic	Rich Sexton	9,960	100.00%
Total votes		9,960	100.00%

=== General election ===
==== Candidates ====
- Ken Feduniewicz (The Patriot Movement)
- Jim Saxton, incumbent Representative from Mount Holly since 1984 (Republican)
- Rich Sexton (Democratic)

==== Predictions ====
Source	Ranking	As of
The Cook Political Report	Safe R	November 6, 2006
Rothenberg	Safe R	November 6, 2006
Sabato's Crystal Ball	Safe R	November 6, 2006
Real Clear Politics	Safe R	November 7, 2006
CQ Politics	Safe R	November 7, 2006

==== Results ====
2006 U.S. House election
Party	Candidate	Votes	%	±%
Republican	Jim Saxton (incumbent)	122,559	58.40%	▼5.04
Democratic	Rich Sexton	86,113	41.04%	▲6.39
Independent	Ken Feduniewicz	1,179	0.56%	N/A
Total votes		209,851	100.00%	

==== By county ====
County	Jim Saxton Republican		Rich Sexton Democratic		Ken Feduniewicz Patriot Movement		Margin		Total votes cast
County	#	%	#	%	#	%	#	%	Total votes cast
Burlington (part)	55,709	56.1%	43,253	43.5%	429	0.4%	12,456	12.6%	99,391
Camden (part)	10,834	45.7%	12,822	54.0%	68	0.3%	-1,988	-8.3%	23,724
Ocean (part)	56,016	64.6%	30,038	34.6%	682	0.8%	25,978	30.0%	86,736
Totals	122,559	58.4%	86,113	41.0%	1,179	0.6%	36,446	17.4%	209,851

== District 4 ==
2006 New Jersey's 4th congressional district election
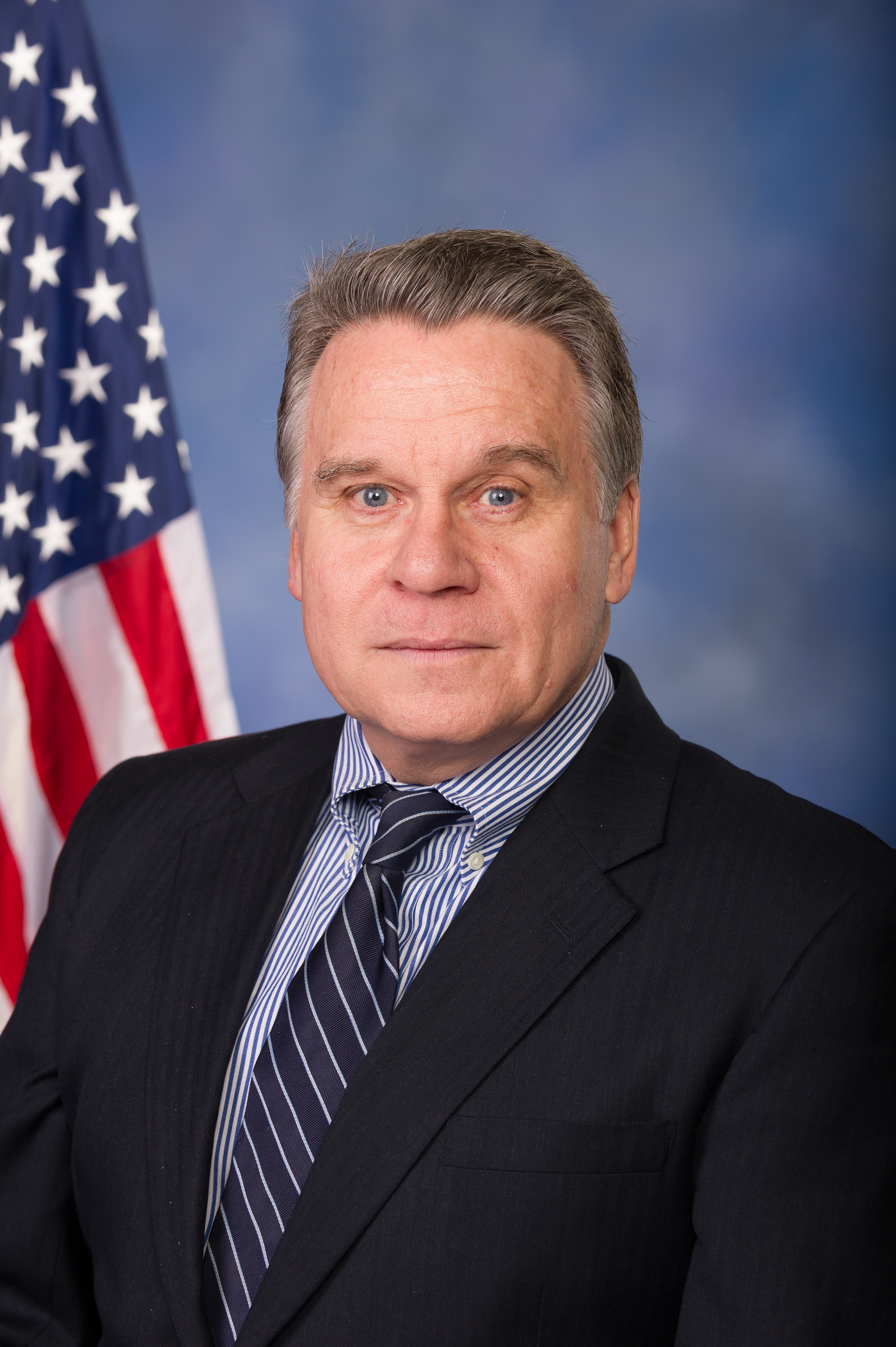

Nominee	Chris Smith	Carol Gay
Party	Republican	Democratic
Popular vote	124,482	62,905
Percentage	65.7%	33.2%
- County results *: 50–60% 60–70%
U.S. Representative before election
Chris Smith
Republican
Elected U.S. Representative
incumbent
Republican

Incumbent Republican Chris Smith defeated Democrat Carol Gay. Between 2003 and 2013, this district covered parts of Mercer, Monmouth, Ocean, and Burlington counties.

=== Republican primary ===
==== Candidates ====
- Chris Smith, incumbent Representative since 1981

==== Results ====
2006 Republican U.S. House primary
Party	Candidate	Votes	%
Republican	Chris Smith (incumbent)	16,109	100.00%
Total votes		16,109	100.00%

=== Democratic primary ===
==== Candidates ====
- Carol E. Gay

==== Results ====
2006 Democratic U.S. House primary
Party	Candidate	Votes	%
Democratic	Carol E. Gay	8,368	100.00%
Total votes		8,368	100.00%

=== General election ===
==== Candidates ====
- Richard Edgar (Libertarian)
- Carol E. Gay (Democratic)
- Chris Smith, incumbent Representative since 1981 (Republican)
- Louis B. Wary Jr. (Remove Medical Negligence)

==== Predictions ====
Source	Ranking	As of
The Cook Political Report	Safe R	November 6, 2006
Rothenberg	Safe R	November 6, 2006
Sabato's Crystal Ball	Safe R	November 6, 2006
Real Clear Politics	Safe R	November 7, 2006
CQ Politics	Safe R	November 7, 2006

==== Results ====
2006 U.S. House election
Party	Candidate	Votes	%	
Republican	Chris Smith (incumbent)	124,482	65.68%	▼1.32
Democratic	Carol Gay	62,905	33.19%	▲0.91
Libertarian	Richard Edgar	1,539	0.81%	▲0.10
Independent	Louis B. Wary Jr.	614	0.32%	N/A
Total votes		189,540	100.00%	

==== By county ====
County	Chris Smith Republican		Carol Gay Democratic		Various candidates Other parties		Margin		Total votes cast
County	#	%	#	%	#	%	#	%	Total votes cast
Burlington (part)	13,034	59.5%	8,673	39.6%	186	0.8%	4,361	19.9%	21,893
Mercer (part)	25,153	61.5%	15,324	37.5%	428	1.1%	9,829	24.0%	40,905
Monmouth (part)	33,621	67.6%	15,417	31.0%	725	1.4%	18,204	36.6%	49,763
Ocean (part)	52,674	68.4%	23,491	30.5%	814	1.1%	29,183	37.9%	76,979
Totals	124,482	65.7%	62,905	33.2%	2,153	1.1%	61,577	32.5%	189,540

== District 5 ==
2006 New Jersey's 5th congressional district election
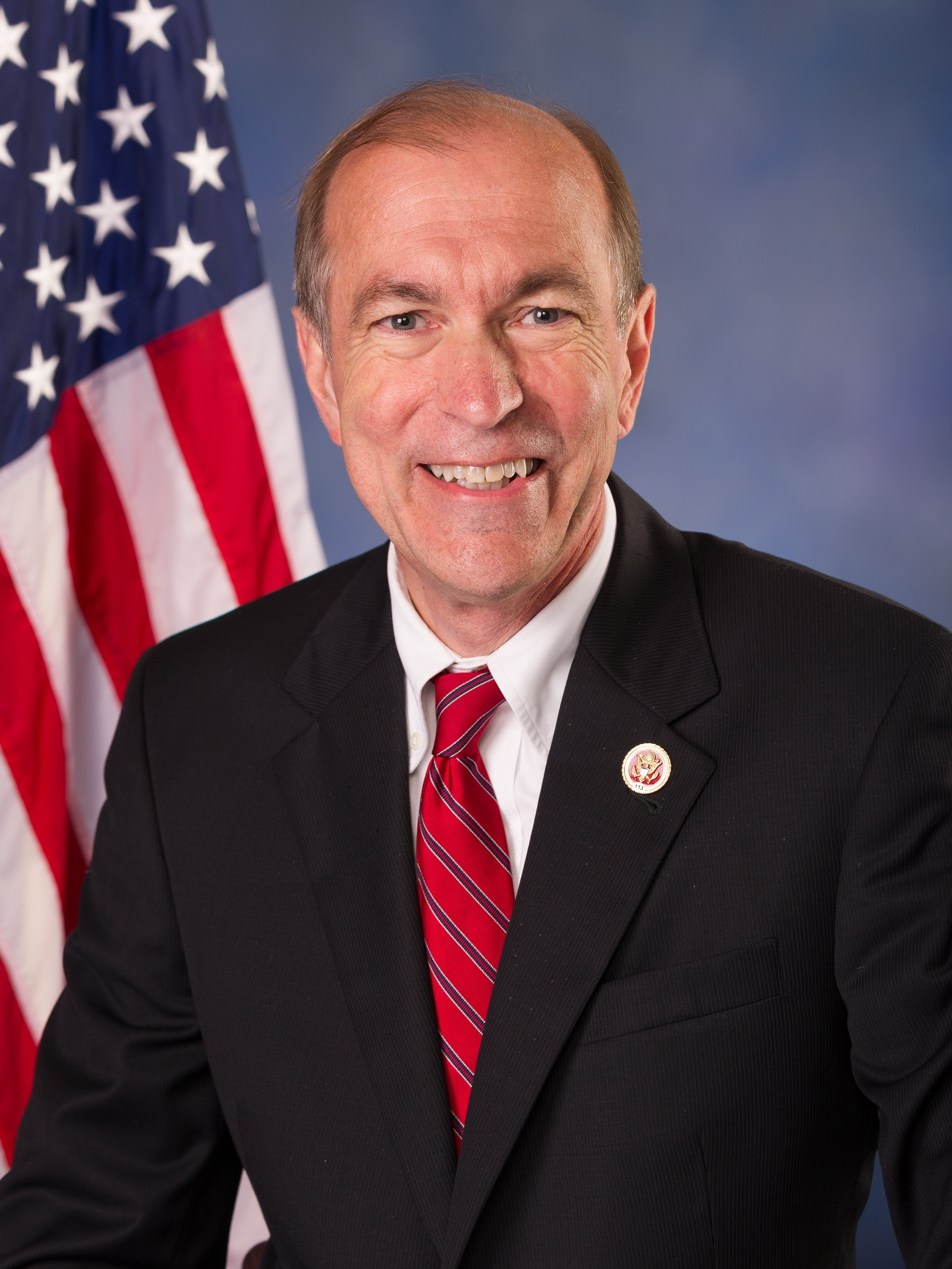

Nominee	Scott Garrett	Paul Aronsohn
Party	Republican	Democratic
Popular vote	112,142	89,503
Percentage	54.9%	43.8%
- County results *: 50–60% 60–70%
U.S. Representative before election
Scott Garett
Republican
Elected U.S. Representative
incumbent
Republican

Republican incumbent Scott Garrett defeated Democratic nominee Paul Aronsohn. Between 2003 and 2013, this district covered parts of Bergen, Passaic, and Sussex counties, as well as all of Warren county.

=== Republican primary ===
==== Candidates ====
- Michael Cino
- Scott Garrett, incumbent Representative from Wantage since 2003

==== Results ====
2006 Republican U.S. House primary
Party	Candidate	Votes	%
Republican	Scott Garrett (incumbent)	23,760	86.38%
Republican	Michael J. Cino	3,747	13.62%
Total votes		27,507	100.00%

=== Democratic primary ===
==== Candidates ====
- Paul Aronsohn, Pfizer executive and former communications official for the United States Department of State and Governor of New Jersey Jim McGreevey
- Camille Abate, Glen Rock attorney

==== Campaign ====
During the primary campaign, Abate sued Aronsohn for libel after Aronsohn claimed Abate had never previously been a registered Democrat. Abate countered that she was a registered Democrat when she originally registered to vote at age 18 and when she lived out of state.

==== Results ====
Aronsohn defeated Abate 66% to 33%.

2006 Democratic U.S. House primary
Party	Candidate	Votes	%
Democratic	Paul Aronsohn	6,857	66.31%
Democratic	Camille M. Abate	3,484	33.69%
Total votes		10,341	100.00%

=== General election ===
==== Candidates ====
- Paul Aronsohn (Democratic)
- R. Matthew Fretz (An Independent Voice)
- Scott Garrett, incumbent Representative from Wantage since 2003 (Republican)

==== Endorsements ====
Paul Aronsohn (D)

Individuals

- Wesley Clark, General, 2004 democratic presidential candidate

==== Predictions ====
Source	Ranking	As of
The Cook Political Report	Safe R	November 6, 2006
Rothenberg	Safe R	November 6, 2006
Sabato's Crystal Ball	Safe R	November 6, 2006
Real Clear Politics	Safe R	November 7, 2006
CQ Politics	Likely R	November 7, 2006

==== Results ====
2006 U.S. House election
Party	Candidate	Votes	%	
Republican	Scott Garett (incumbent)	112,142	54.91%	▼2.66
Democratic	Paul Aronsohn	89,503	43.82%	▲2.71
Independent	R. Matthew Fretz	2,597	1.27%	N/A
Total votes		204,242	100.00%	

==== By county ====
County	Scott Garrett Republican		Paul Aronsohn Democratic		Matthew Fretz Independent		Margin		Total votes cast
County	#	%	#	%	#	%	#	%	Total votes cast
Bergen (part)	67,287	51.3%	62,944	48.0%	909	0.7%	4,343	3.3%	131,140
Passaic (part)	8,731	57.4%	6,273	41.2%	210	1.4%	2,458	16.2%	15,214
Sussex (part)	19,094	63.7%	9,995	33.4%	863	2.9%	9,099	30.3%	29,952
Warren	17,030	61.0%	10,291	36.8%	615	2.2%	6,739	24.2%	27,936
Totals	112,142	54.9%	89,503	43.8%	2,597	1.3%	22,639	11.1%	204,242

== District 6 ==
2006 New Jersey's 6th congressional district election
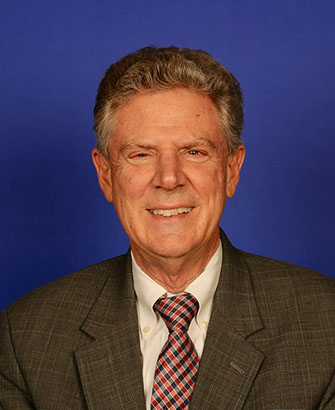

Nominee	Frank Pallone	Leigh-Ann Bellew
Party	Democratic	Republican
Popular vote	98,615	43,359
Percentage	68.7%	30.2%
- County results *: 60–70% 70–80% 80–90%
U.S. Representative before election
Frank Pallone
Democratic
Elected U.S. Representative
Incumbent
Democratic

Incumbent Democrat Frank Pallone defeated Republican challenger Leigh-Ann Bellew. Between 2003 and 2013, this district covered parts of Monmouth, Middlesex, Somerset, and Union counties.

=== Democratic primary ===
==== Candidates ====
- Frank Pallone, incumbent Representative from Long Branch since 1988

==== Results ====
2006 Democratic U.S. House primary
Party	Candidate	Votes	%
Democratic	Frank Pallone (incumbent)	10,934	100.00%
Total votes		10,934	100.00%

=== Republican primary ===
==== Candidates ====
- Leigh-Ann Bellew

==== Results ====
2006 Republican U.S. House primary
Party	Candidate	Votes	%
Republican	Leigh-Ann Bellew	5,309	100.00%
Total votes		5,309	100.00%

=== General election ===
==== Candidates ====
- Leigh-Ann Bellew (Republican)
- Frank Pallone, incumbent Representative from Long Branch since 1988 (Democratic)
- Herbert L. Tarbous (Diversity is Strength)

==== Predictions ====
Source	Ranking	As of
The Cook Political Report	Safe D	November 6, 2006
Rothenberg	Safe D	November 6, 2006
Sabato's Crystal Ball	Safe D	November 6, 2006
Real Clear Politics	Safe D	November 7, 2006
CQ Politics	Safe D	November 7, 2006

==== Results ====
2006 U.S. House election
Party	Candidate	Votes	%	
Democratic	Frank Pallone (Incumbent)	98,615	68.68%	▲1.78
Republican	Leigh-Ann Bellew	43,359	30.20%	▼0.62
Independent	Herbert Tarbous	1,619	1.13%	N/A
Total votes		143,773	100.00%	

==== By county ====
County	Frank Pallone Democratic		Leigh Ann Bellew Republican		Various candidates Other parties		Margin		Total votes cast
County	#	%	#	%	#	%	#	%	Total votes cast
Middlesex (part)	39,176	68.9%	16,795	29.5%	876	1.5%	22,381	37.4%	56,847
Monmouth (part)	50,689	66.3%	25,194	32.9%	588	0.8%	25,495	33.4%	76,471
Somerset (part)	2,784	77.3%	762	21.2%	55	1.5%	2,022	56.1%	3,601
Union (part)	5,966	87.0%	788	11.5%	100	1.5%	5,178	75.5%	6,854
Totals	98,615	68.6%	43,539	30.3%	1,619	1.1%	55,076	38.3%	143,773

== District 7 ==
2006 New Jersey's 7th congressional district election
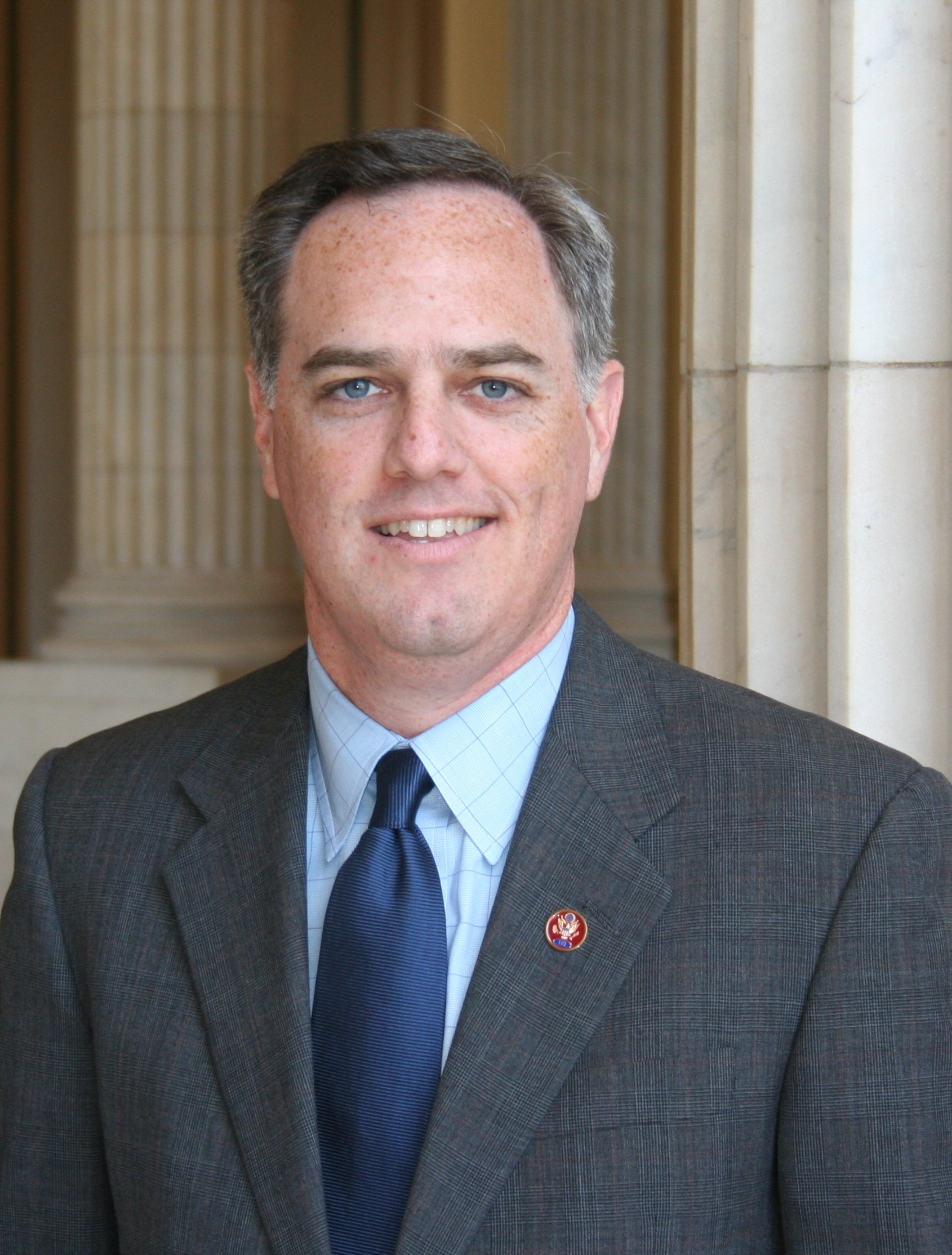

Nominee	Mike Ferguson	Linda Stender
Party	Republican	Democratic
Popular vote	98,399	95,454
Percentage	49.4%	48.0%
- County results Stender: 40–50% 50–60% *: 50–60%
U.S. Representative before election
Mike Ferguson
Republican
Elected U.S. Representative
Mike Ferguson
Republican

Incumbent Republican Mike Ferguson narrowly defeated then-state assemblywoman Linda Stender, a Democrat. Between 2003 and 2013, this district covered parts of Middlesex, Union, Somerset, and Hunterdon counties.

=== Republican primary ===
==== Candidates ====
- Mike Ferguson, incumbent Representative from Union since 2001

==== Results ====
2006 Republican U.S. House primary
Party	Candidate	Votes	%
Republican	Mike Ferguson (incumbent)	16,423	100.00%
Total votes		16,423	100.00%

=== Democratic primary ===
==== Candidates ====
- Linda Stender, Assemblywoman from Fanwood since 2002

==== Results ====
2006 Democratic U.S. House primary
Party	Candidate	Votes	%
Democratic	Linda Stender	8,631	100.00%
Total votes		8,631	100.00%

=== General election ===
==== Candidates ====
- Thomas D. Abrams, Libertarian nominee for this seat in 2004 (Withdraw Troops Now)
- Mike Ferguson, incumbent Representative from Union since 2001 (Republican)
- Linda Stender, Assemblywoman from Fanwood since 2002 (Democratic)
- Darren Young (Libertarian)

==== Predictions ====
Source	Ranking	As of
The Cook Political Report	Lean R	November 6, 2006
Rothenberg	Lean R	November 6, 2006
Sabato's Crystal Ball	Lean R	November 6, 2006
Real Clear Politics	Safe R	November 7, 2006
CQ Politics	Lean R	November 7, 2006

==== Results ====
2006 U.S. House election
Party	Candidate	Votes	%
Republican	Mike Ferguson (incumbent)	98,399	49.43%
Democratic	Linda Stender	95,454	47.95%
Independent	Thomas Abrams	3,176	1.60%
Libertarian	Darren Young	2,046	1.03%
Total votes		199,075	100.00%

==== By county ====
County	Mike Ferguson Republican		Linda Stender Democratic		Various candidates Other parties		Margin		Total votes cast
County	#	%	#	%	#	%	#	%	Total votes cast
Hunterdon (part)	19,270	56.4%	13,537	39.6%	1,335	4.0%	5,733	16.8%	34,142
Middlesex (part)	13,796	41.0%	18,954	56.3%	939	2.8%	-5,158	-15.3%	33,689
Somerset (part)	28,480	51.4%	25,295	45.7%	1,600	2.9%	3,185	5.7%	55,375
Union (part)	36,853	48.6%	37,668	49.6%	1,348	1.8%	-815	-1.0%	75,869
Totals	98,399	49.4%	95,494	47.9%	5,222	2.6%	2,945	1.5%	199,075

== District 8 ==
2006 New Jersey's 8th congressional district election
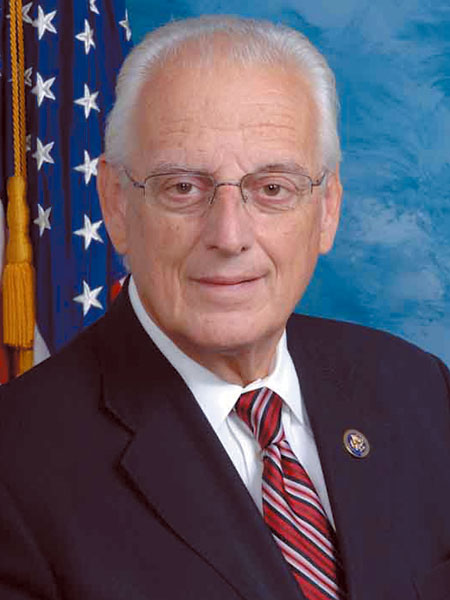

Nominee	Bill Pascrell	Jose Sandoval
Party	Democratic	Republican
Popular vote	97,568	39,053
Percentage	70.9%	28.4%
- County results *: 70–80%
U.S. Representative before election
Bill Pascrell
Democratic
Elected U.S. Representative
incumbent
Democratic

Incumbent Democrat Bill Pascrell defeated Republican Jose Sandoval. This district covers Essex and Passaic counties.

=== Democratic primary ===
==== Candidates ====
- Bill Pascrell, incumbent Representative from Paterson since 1997

==== Results ====
2006 Democratic U.S. House primary
Party	Candidate	Votes	%
Democratic	Bill Pascrell (incumbent)	11,083	100.00%
Total votes		11,083	100.00%

=== Republican primary ===
==== Candidates ====
- Jose M. Sandoval

==== Results ====
2006 Republican U.S. House primary
Party	Candidate	Votes	%
Republican	Jose M. Sandoval	3,982	100.00%
Total votes		3,982	100.00%

=== General election ===
==== Candidates ====
- Lou Jasikoff (Libertarian)
- Bill Pascrell, incumbent Representative from Paterson since 1997 (Democratic)
- Jose Sandoval (Republican)

==== Predictions ====
Source	Ranking	As of
The Cook Political Report	Safe D	November 6, 2006
Rothenberg	Safe D	November 6, 2006
Sabato's Crystal Ball	Safe D	November 6, 2006
Real Clear Politics	Safe D	November 7, 2006
CQ Politics	Safe D	November 7, 2006

==== Results ====
2006 U.S. House election
Party	Candidate	Votes	%	
Democratic	Bill Pascrell (incumbent)	97,568	70.89%	▲1.43
Republican	Jose Sandoval	39,053	28.37%	▼0.31
Libertarian	Lou Jasikoff	1,018	0.74%	N/A
Total votes		137,639	100.00%	

==== By county ====
County	Bill Pascrell Democratic		Jose Sandoval Republican		Louis Jasikoff Libertarian		Margin		Total votes cast
County	#	%	#	%	#	%	#	%	Total votes cast
Essex (part)	42,708	71.1%	16,730	27.9%	609	1.0%	25,978	43.2%	60,047
Passaic (part)	54,860	70.7%	22,323	28.8%	409	0.5%	32,537	41.9%	77,592
Totals	97,568	70.9%	39,053	28.4%	1,018	0.7%	58,515	42.5%	137,639

== District 9 ==
2006 New Jersey's 9th congressional district election
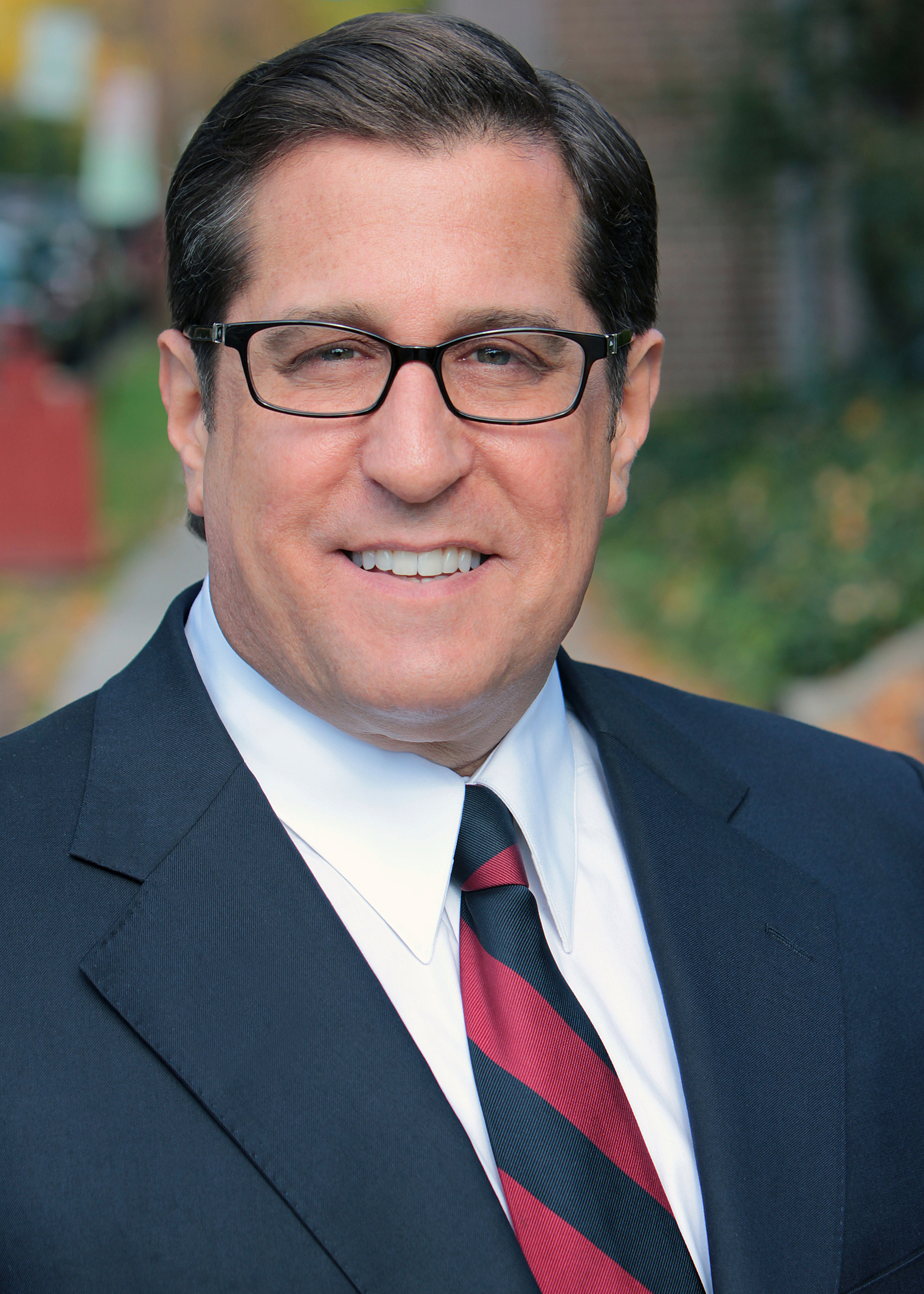

Nominee	Steve Rothman	Vincent Micco
Party	Democratic	Republican
Popular vote	105,853	40,879
Percentage	71.5%	27.6%
- County results *: 50–60% 70–80%
U.S. Representative before election
Steve Rothman
Democratic
Elected U.S. Representative
incumbent
Democratic

Incumbent Democrat Steve Rothman defeated Republican Vincent Micco. This district covers mostly Bergen County.

=== Democratic primary ===
==== Candidates ====
- Steve Rothman, incumbent Representative from Fair Lawn since 1997

==== Results ====
2006 Democratic U.S. House primary
Party	Candidate	Votes	%
Democratic	Steve Rothman (incumbent)	18,513	100.00%
Total votes		18,513	100.00%

=== Republican primary ===
==== Candidates ====
- Vincent Micco

==== Results ====
2006 Republican U.S. House primary
Party	Candidate	Votes	%
Republican	Vincent Micco	6,169	100.00%
Total votes		6,169	100.00%

=== General election ===
==== Candidates ====
- Michael Jarvis (The Moderate Choice)
- Vincent Micco (Republican)
- Steve Rothman, incumbent Representative from Fair Lawn since 1997 (Democratic)

==== Predictions ====
Source	Ranking	As of
The Cook Political Report	Safe D	November 6, 2006
Rothenberg	Safe D	November 6, 2006
Sabato's Crystal Ball	Safe D	November 6, 2006
Real Clear Politics	Safe D	November 7, 2006
CQ Politics	Safe D	November 7, 2006

==== Results ====
New Jersey's 9th congressional district election, 2006
Party	Candidate	Votes	%	
Democratic	Steve Rothman (incumbent)	105,853	71.48%	▲3.95
Republican	Vincent Micco	40,879	27.60%	▼4.11
Independent	Michael Jarvis	1,363	0.92%	N/A

==== By county ====
County	Steve Rothman Democratic		Vincent Micco Republican		Michael Jarvis Moderate		Margin		Total votes cast
County	#	%	#	%	#	%	#	%	Total votes cast
Bergen (part)	86,507	71.5%	33,571	27.7%	934	0.8%	52,936	43.8%	121,012
Hudson (part)	16,973	75.3%	5,161	22.9%	392	1.7%	11,812	52.4%	22,526
Passaic (part)	2,373	52.1%	2,147	47.1%	37	0.8%	226	5.0%	4,557
Totals	105,583	71.3%	40,879	27.6%	1,633	1.1%	64,704	43.7%	148,095

== District 10 ==
2006 New Jersey's 10th congressional district election
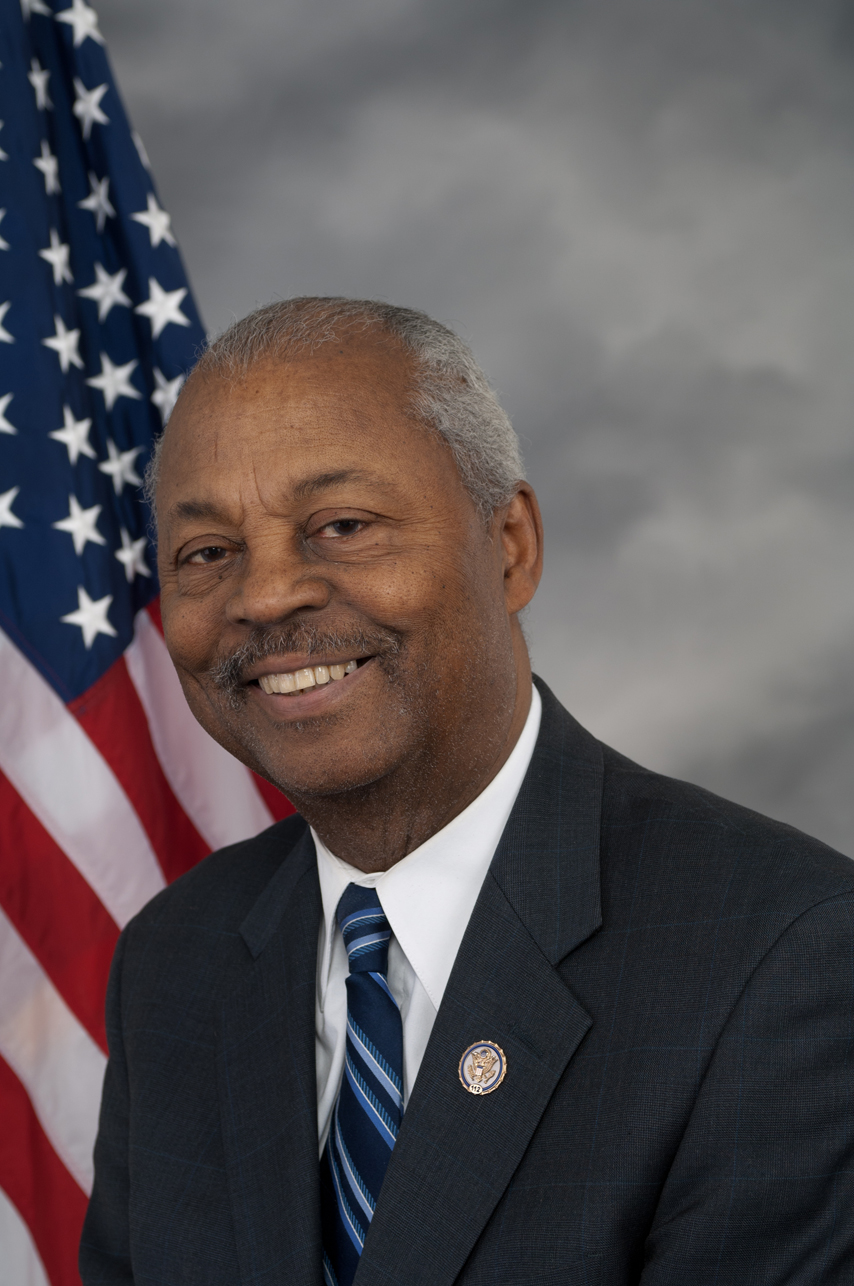
Nominee	Donald Payne
Party	Democratic
Popular vote	90,264
Percentage	100.0%
U.S. Representative before election
Donald Payne
Democratic
Elected U.S. Representative
incumbent
Democratic

Incumbent Democrat Donald M. Payne won unopposed. This district covers a heavily urbanized area, which includes the city of Newark.

=== Democratic primary ===
==== Candidates ====
- Donald M. Payne, incumbent Representative from Newark since 1989

==== Results ====
2006 Democratic U.S. House primary
Party	Candidate	Votes	%
Democratic	Donald M. Payne (incumbent)	22,361	100.00%
Total votes		22,361	100.00%

=== General election ===
==== Candidates ====
- Donald M. Payne, incumbent Representative from Newark since 1989 (Democratic)

==== Predictions ====
Source	Ranking	As of
The Cook Political Report	Safe D	November 6, 2006
Rothenberg	Safe D	November 6, 2006
Sabato's Crystal Ball	Safe D	November 6, 2006
Real Clear Politics	Safe D	November 7, 2006
CQ Politics	Safe D	November 7, 2006

==== Results ====
2006 U.S. House election
Party	Candidate	Votes	%	
Democratic	Donald Payne (incumbent)	90,264	100.00%	▲3.12
Total votes		90,264	100.00%	

==== By county ====
County	Donald Payne Jr. Democratic	
County	#	%
Essex (part)	55,182	100.00%
Hudson (part)	7,822	100.00%
Union (part)	27,260	100.00%
Totals	90,264	100.00%

== District 11 ==
2006 New Jersey's 11th congressional district election
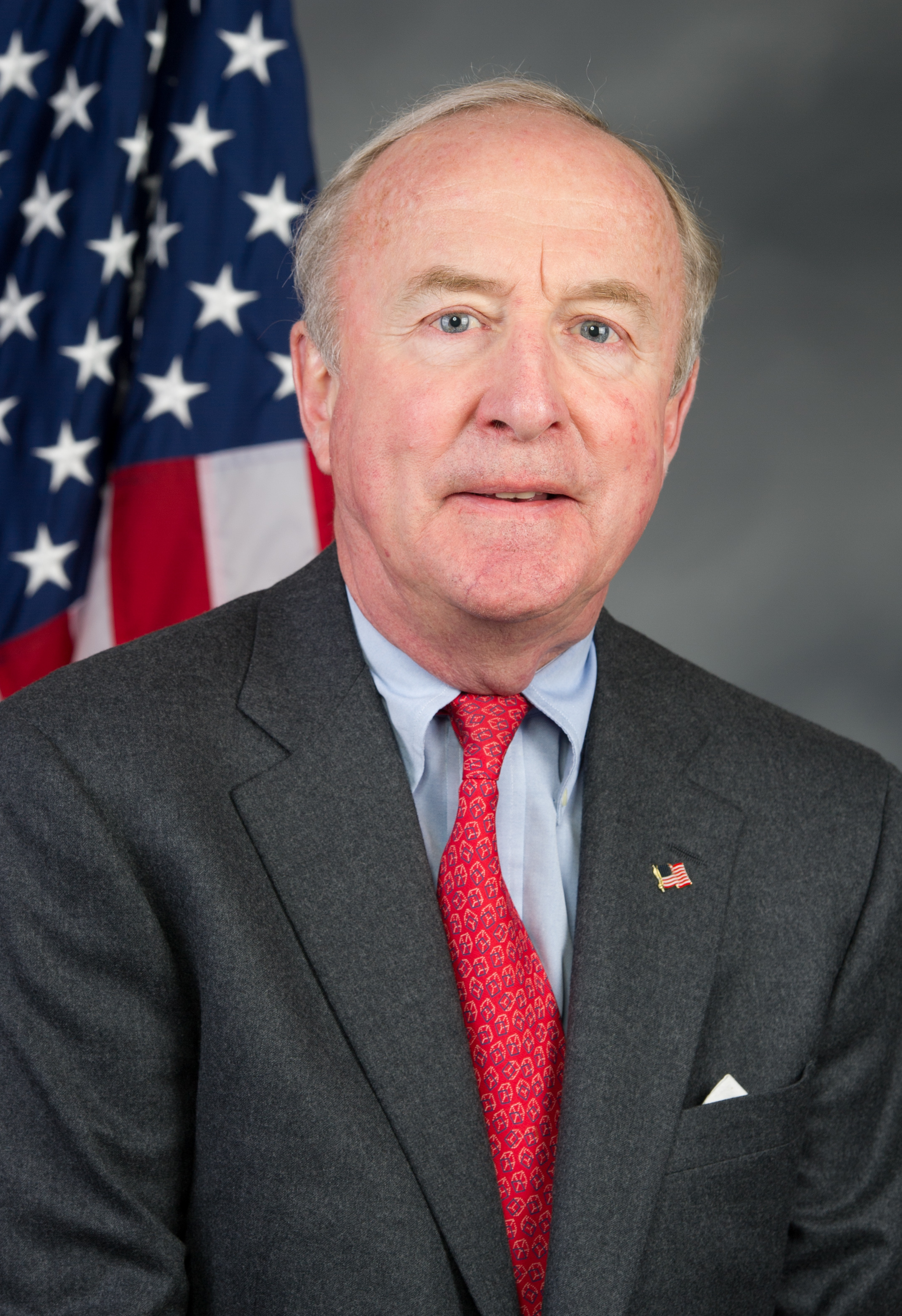

Nominee	Rodney Frelinghuysen	Tom Wyka
Party	Republican	Democratic
Popular vote	126,085	74,414
Percentage	62.1%	36.6%
- County results *: 50–60% 60–70%
U.S. Representative before election
Rodney Frelinghuysen
Republican
Elected U.S. Representative
incumbent
Republican

Incumbent Republican Rodney Frelinghuysen defeated Democrat Tom Wyka. This district covers mostly Morris County.

=== Republican primary ===
==== Candidates ====
- Rodney Frelinghuysen, incumbent Representative from Harding since 1995

==== Results ====
2006 Republican U.S. House primary
Party	Candidate	Votes	%
Republican	Rodney Frelinghuysen (incumbent)	26,461	100.00%
Total votes		26,461	100.00%

=== Democratic primary ===
==== Candidates ====
- Tom Wyka

==== Results ====
2006 Democratic U.S. House primary
Party	Candidate	Votes	%
Democratic	Tom Wyka	8,235	100.00%
Total votes		8,235	100.00%

=== General election ===
==== Candidates ====
- Rodney Frelinghuysen, incumbent Representative from Harding since 1995 (Republican)
- John Mele (Constitution)
- Libertarian (Richard S. Roth)
- Tom Wyka (Democratic)

==== Predictions ====
Source	Ranking	As of
The Cook Political Report	Safe R	November 6, 2006
Rothenberg	Safe R	November 6, 2006
Sabato's Crystal Ball	Safe R	November 6, 2006
Real Clear Politics	Safe R	November 7, 2006
CQ Politics	Safe R	November 7, 2006

==== Results ====
New Jersey's 11th congressional district election, 2006
Party	Candidate	Votes	%	
Republican	Rodney Frelinghuysen (incumbent)	126,085	62.09%	▼5.79
Democratic	Tom Wyka	74,414	36.64%	▲5.62
Libertarian	Richard S. Roth	1,730	0.85%	▲0.33
Constitution	John Mele	842	0.41%	▼0.18
Total votes		203,071	100.00%	

==== By county ====
County	Rodney Frelinghuysen Republican		Tom Wyka Democratic		All others		Margin		Total votes cast
County	#	%	#	%	#	%	#	%	Total votes cast
Essex (part)	12,572	58.9%	8,457	39.6%	307	1.5%	4,115	19.3%	21,336
Morris	92,108	62.5%	53,687	36.4%	1,530	1.0%	38,421	26.1%	147,325
Passaic (part)	744	59.5%	496	39.6%	11	0.8%	248	19.9%	1,251
Somerset (part)	12,427	60.6%	7,720	37.7%	347	1.7%	4,707	22.9%	20,494
Sussex (part)	8,234	65.0%	4,054	32.0%	377	3.0%	4,180	33.0%	12,665
Totals	126,085	62.1%	74,414	36.6%	2,572	1.3%	51,671	25.5%	203,071

== District 12 ==
2006 New Jersey's 12th congressional district election
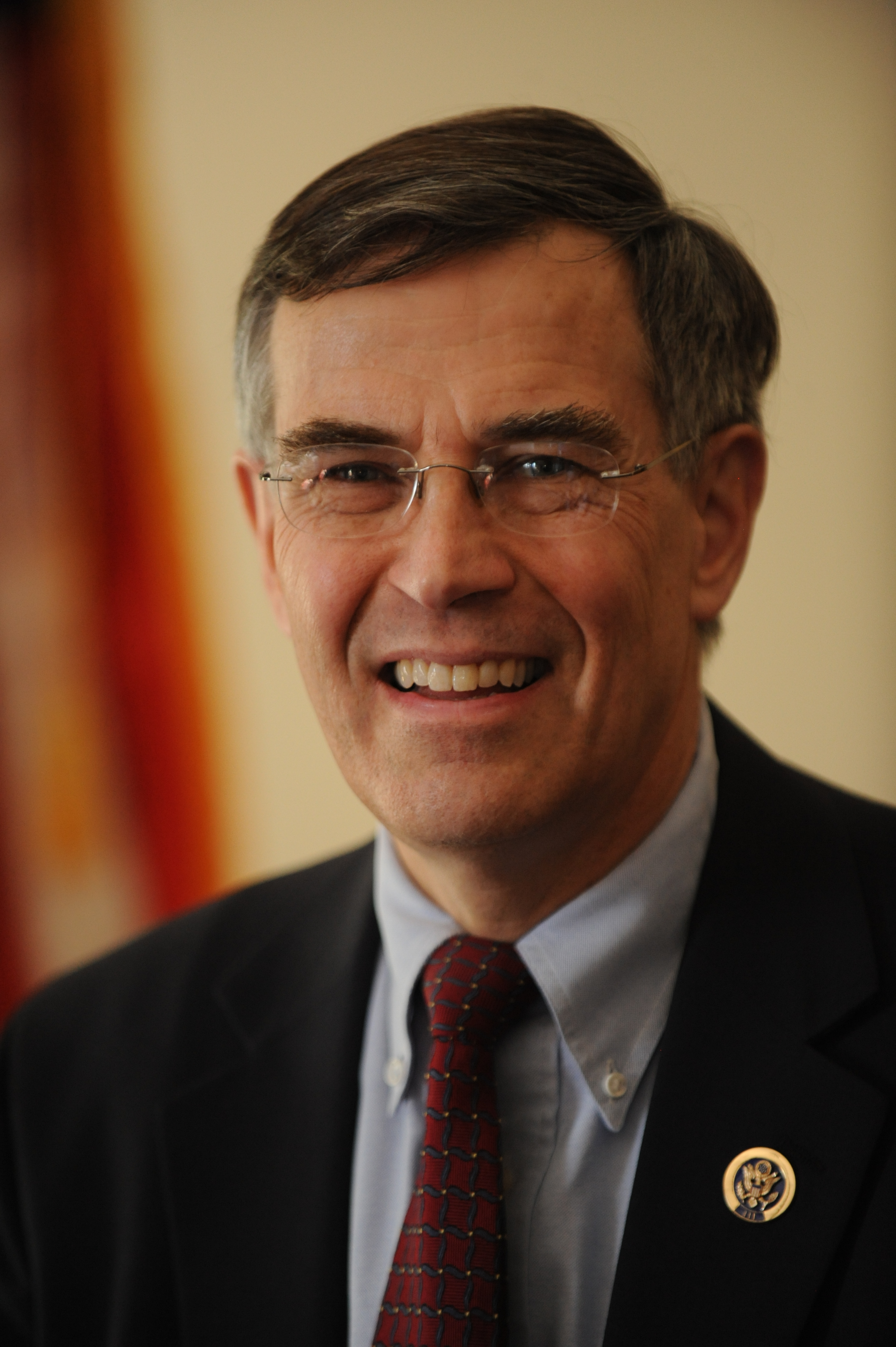

Nominee	Rush Holt	Joseph S. Sinagra
Party	Democratic	Republican
Popular vote	125,468	65,509
Percentage	65.7%	34.3%
- County results *: 50–60% 60–70% 70–80%
U.S. Representative before election
Rush Holt
Democratic
Elected U.S. Representative
incumbent
Democratic

Incumbent Democrat Rush Holt defeated Republican Joseph Sinagra. This district covers 5 suburban counties in the central part of the state.

=== Democratic primary ===
==== Candidates ====
- Rush Holt Jr., incumbent Representative from Pennington since 1999

==== Results ====
2006 Democratic U.S. House primary
Party	Candidate	Votes	%
Democratic	Rush Holt Jr. (incumbent)	13,315	100.00%
Total votes		13,315	100.00%

=== Republican primary ===
==== Candidates ====
- Joseph S. Sinagra, former Helmetta Borough Council president and nominee for Middlesex County Clerk in 2005

==== Results ====
2006 Republican U.S. House primary
Party	Candidate	Votes	%
Republican	Joseph S. Sinagra	9,383	100.00%
Total votes		9,383	100.00%

=== General election ===
==== Candidates ====
- Rush Holt Jr., incumbent Representative from Pennington since 1999 (Democratic)
- Joseph S. Sinagra, former Helmetta Borough Council president and nominee for Middlesex County Clerk in 2005 (Republican)

==== Predictions ====
Source	Ranking	As of
The Cook Political Report	Safe D	November 6, 2006
Rothenberg	Safe D	November 6, 2006
Sabato's Crystal Ball	Safe D	November 6, 2006
Real Clear Politics	Safe D	November 7, 2006
CQ Politics	Safe D	November 7, 2006

==== Results ====
2006 U.S. House election
Party	Candidate	Votes	%	
Democratic	Rush Holt (incumbent)	125,468	65.70%	▲6.45
Republican	Joseph S. Sinagra	65,509	34.30%	▼5.39
Total votes		190,977	100.00%	

==== By county ====
County	Rush Holt Democratic		Joe Sinagra Republican		Margin		Total votes cast
County	#	%	#	%	#	%	Total votes cast
Hunterdon (part)	5,906	61.5%	3,701	38.5%	2,205	23.0%	9,607
Mercer (part)	30,556	72.5%	11,585	27.5%	18,971	45.0%	42,141
Middlesex (part)	43,458	64.6%	23,777	35.4%	19,681	29.2%	67,235
Monmouth (part)	29,262	56.1%	22,917	43.9%	6,345	12.2%	52,179
Somerset (part)	7,286	67.4%	3,529	32.6%	3,757	34.8%	10,815
Totals	125,468	65.7%	65,509	34.3%	59,959	31.4%	190,977

== District 13 ==
2006 New Jersey's 13th congressional district election
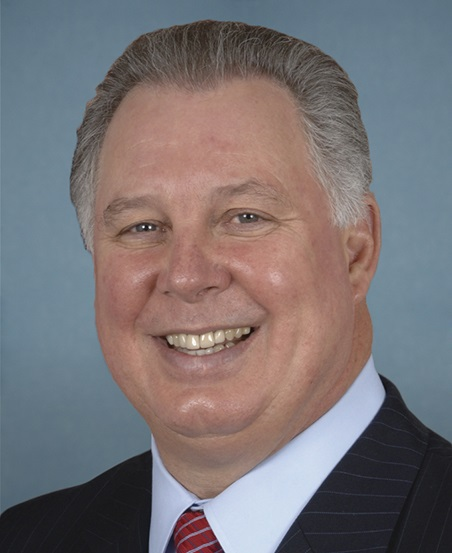

Nominee	Albio Sires	John Guarini
Party	Democratic	Republican
Popular vote	77,238	19,284
Percentage	77.5%	19.4%
- County results Sires: 70–80% 80–90%
U.S. Representative before election
Bob Menendez
Democratic
Elected U.S. Representative
Albio Sires
Democratic

Albio Sires, the Speaker of the State Assembly, defeated John Guarini, a salesman.

=== Democratic primary ===
==== Candidates ====
- Albio Sires, Speaker of the New Jersey General Assembly and mayor of West New York
- Joseph Vas, Assemblyman and mayor of Perth Amboy

==== Results ====
2006 Democratic U.S. House primary
Party	Candidate	Votes	%
Democratic	Albio Sires	24,661	72.22%
Democratic	Joseph Vas	9,486	27.78%
Total votes		34,147	100.00%

=== Republican primary ===
==== Candidates ====
- John J. Guarini, Jersey City salesman

==== Results ====
2006 Republican U.S. House primary
Party	Candidate	Votes	%
Republican	John J. Guarini	2,769	100.00%
Total votes		2,769	100.00%

=== General election ===
==== Candidates ====
- John J. Guarini, Jersey City salesman (Republican)
- Dick Hester (Pro Life Conservative) (also a candidate in the concurrent special election)
- Herbert H. Shaw, perennial candidate from North Bergen (Politicians are Crooks)
- Albio Sires, Speaker of the New Jersey General Assembly and mayor of West New York (Democratic)
- Brian Williams (Socialist Workers)
- Esmat Zaklama (The American Party)

==== Predictions ====
Source	Ranking	As of
The Cook Political Report	Safe D	November 6, 2006
Rothenberg	Safe D	November 6, 2006
Sabato's Crystal Ball	Safe D	November 6, 2006
Real Clear Politics	Safe D	November 7, 2006
CQ Politics	Safe D	November 7, 2006

==== Results ====
2006 U.S. House election
Party	Candidate	Votes	%	
Democratic	Albio Sires	77,238	77.52%	▲1.67
Republican	John Guarini	19,284	19.36%	▼2.76
Socialist Workers	Brian Williams	1,049	1.05%	N/A
Independent	Herbert H. Shaw	998	1.00%	▲0.33
Independent	Dick Hester	586	0.59%	▼0.21
Independent	Esmat Zaklama	475	0.48%	N/A
Total votes		99,630	100.00%	

==== By county ====
County	Albio Sires Democratic		John Guarini Republican		Various candidates Other parties		Margin		Total votes cast
County	#	%	#	%	#	%	#	%	Total votes cast
Essex (part)	10,147	85.2%	1,430	12.0%	329	2.8%	8,717	73.2%	11,906
Hudson (part)	54,700	76.7%	14,317	20.1%	2,282	3.2%	40,383	56.6%	71,299
Middlesex (part)	8,385	74.0%	2,616	23.1%	329	2.9%	5,769	50.9%	11,330
Union (part)	4,006	78.6%	921	18.1%	168	3.3%	3,085	60.5%	5,095
Totals	77,238	77.5%	19,284	19.4%	3,108	3.1%	57,954	58.1%	99,630
