= 1976 United States presidential election in New Jersey =

- November 2, 1976
- Turnout: 80.57% (▼3.84%)

Nominee	Gerald Ford	Jimmy Carter
Party	Republican	Democratic
Home state	Michigan	Georgia
Running mate	Bob Dole	Walter Mondale
Electoral vote	17	0
Popular vote	1,509,688	1,444,653
Percentage	50.08%	47.92%
County results
Ford
50–60%
60–70%
Carter
40–50%
50–60%
President before election
Gerald Ford
Republican
Elected President
Jimmy Carter
Democratic

The 1976 United States presidential election in New Jersey took place on November 2, 1976. All 50 states and the District of Columbia, were part of the 1976 United States presidential election. Voters chose 17 electors to the Electoral College, which selected the president and vice president.

New Jersey was won by the Republican nominees, incumbent President Gerald Ford of Michigan and his running mate Senator Bob Dole of Kansas. Ford and Dole defeated the Democratic nominees, Governor Jimmy Carter of Georgia and his running mate Senator Walter Mondale of Minnesota.

Ford narrowly carried New Jersey with 50.08% of the vote to Carter's 47.92%, a victory margin of 2.16%. Anti-war former Democratic Senator Eugene McCarthy of Minnesota, running as an independent presidential candidate, came in a distant third, with 1.09%.

New Jersey weighed in for this election as about 4% more Republican than the national average. New Jersey in this era was a swing state with a slight Republican lean, and Gerald Ford, a moderate Republican, held enough appeal among New Jersey's many moderate suburban voters to carry the state 50–48 even as Jimmy Carter narrowly won nationally by a 50–48 margin. As of the 2024 presidential election, this is the last time a Democrat won the presidency and/or the national popular vote without winning New Jersey. The state would not vote for a losing candidate again until 2000, and for the loser of the popular vote until 2004. This was the last of 3 times that New Jersey voted for the loser of the presidential election in the 20th century, the other times being 1916 and 1948.

== Results ==
1976 United States presidential election in New Jersey
Party	Candidate	Votes	Percentage	Electoral votes
Republican	Gerald Ford (incumbent)	1,509,688	50.08%	17
Democratic	Jimmy Carter	1,444,653	47.92%	0
Independent	Eugene McCarthy	32,717	1.09%	0
Libertarian	Roger MacBride	9,449	0.31%	0
American Independent	Lester Maddox	7,716	0.26%	0
Socialist Labor	Julius Levin	3,686	0.12%	0
Communist	Gus Hall	1,662	0.06%	0
U.S. Labor	Lyndon LaRouche	1,650	0.05%	0
Socialist Workers	Peter Camejo	1,184	0.04%	0
People's	Margaret Wright	1,044	0.03%	0
Prohibition	Ben Bubar	554	0.02%	0
Socialist	Frank Zeidler	469	0.02%	0
Totals		3,014,472	100.0%	17
Voter Turnout (Voting age/Registered)				58%/80%

=== Results by county ===
County	Gerald Ford Republican		Jimmy Carter Democratic		Various candidates Other parties		Margin		Total votes cast
County	#	%	#	%	#	%	#	%	Total votes cast
Atlantic	36,733	45.56%	41,965	52.05%	1,932	2.40%	-5,232	-6.49%	80,630
Bergen	237,331	55.86%	180,738	42.54%	6,784	1.60%	56,593	13.32%	424,853
Burlington	60,960	48.07%	63,309	49.92%	2,551	2.01%	-2,349	-1.85%	126,820
Camden	82,801	42.33%	108,854	55.65%	3,956	2.02%	-26,053	-13.32%	195,611
Cape May	19,498	53.18%	16,489	44.97%	680	1.85%	3,009	8.21%	36,667
Cumberland	20,535	40.84%	29,165	58.00%	587	1.17%	-8,630	-17.16%	50,287
Essex	133,911	42.40%	174,434	55.23%	7,467	2.36%	-40,523	-12.83%	315,812
Gloucester	34,888	46.33%	38,726	51.43%	1,688	2.24%	-3,838	-5.10%	75,302
Hudson	92,636	43.55%	116,241	54.64%	3,853	1.81%	-23,605	-11.09%	212,730
Hunterdon	19,616	59.50%	12,592	38.20%	758	2.30%	7,024	21.30%	32,966
Mercer	58,453	44.67%	69,621	53.20%	2,782	2.13%	-11,168	-8.53%	130,856
Middlesex	113,539	47.14%	122,859	51.01%	4,466	1.85%	-9,320	-3.87%	240,864
Monmouth	110,104	54.29%	88,956	43.87%	3,730	1.84%	21,148	10.42%	202,790
Morris	105,921	61.45%	63,749	36.98%	2,703	1.57%	42,172	24.47%	172,373
Ocean	77,875	56.93%	56,413	41.24%	2,493	1.82%	21,462	15.69%	136,781
Passaic	85,102	51.20%	76,194	45.84%	4,930	2.97%	8,908	5.36%	166,226
Salem	11,639	46.60%	12,826	51.35%	512	2.05%	-1,187	-4.75%	24,977
Somerset	51,260	57.15%	36,258	40.43%	2,173	2.42%	15,002	16.72%	89,691
Sussex	23,613	60.19%	14,759	37.62%	857	2.18%	8,854	22.57%	39,229
Union	118,019	51.56%	106,267	46.42%	4,616	2.02%	11,752	5.14%	228,902
Warren	15,254	50.67%	14,238	47.29%	613	2.04%	1,016	3.38%	30,105
Totals	1,509,688	50.08%	1,444,653	47.92%	60,131	2.00%	65,035	2.16%	3,014,472

==== Counties that flipped from Republican to Democratic ====
- Essex
- Hudson
- Mercer
- Middlesex
- Burlington
- Camden
- Salem
- Gloucester
- Atlantic
- Cumberland

=== By congressional district ===
Ford won 9 of the state's 15 congressional districts, including 5 which elected Democrats, while Carter won the remaining 6 districts.

District	Ford	Carter	Representative
1st	42.4%	57.6%	James Florio
2nd	49.5%	50.5%	William J. Hughes
3rd	56%	44%	James J. Howard
4th	46.2%	53.8%	Frank Thompson
5th	59.3%	40.7%	Millicent Fenwick
6th	51.7%	48.3%	Edwin B. Forsythe
7th	58.1%	40.9%	Andrew Maguire
8th	52.1%	47.9%	Robert A. Roe
9th	54.5%	45.5%	Henry Helstoski
9th	54.5%	45.5%	Harold C. Hollenbeck
10th	27.5%	72.5%	Peter Rodino
11th	51.7%	48.3%	Joseph Minish
12th	53.8%	46.2%	Matt Rinaldo
13th	59.3%	40.7%	Helen Meyner
14th	43.4%	56.6%	Dominick V. Daniels
14th	43.4%	56.6%	Joseph A. LeFante
15th	46.4%	53.6%	Edward J. Patten

== Analysis ==
Reflecting the closeness of the statewide result, Ford and Carter virtually split New Jersey's 21 counties: Ford won 11 counties to Carter's 10. The native Southerner Jimmy Carter performed unusually well among rural voters in South Jersey, winning 6 out of 7 of the southernmost counties in the state. Carter's strongest county by vote share was rural Cumberland County in the far south of the state by the Delaware border, where he won 58–41. However his comfortable victories in more populous traditional Democratic base counties are what made him competitive statewide: in Essex County, he won 55–42, in Hudson County, he won 55–44, and in Mercer County, he won 53–45. He also won heavily populated Middlesex County, but by a narrow 51–47 margin.

The Northern moderate Ford, however, edged out Carter statewide with comfortable victories in heavily populated suburban counties which were dominated by moderate Republicans. In most presidential elections in this era, the most Republican county in the state would usually be rural, sparsely populated Sussex County. While Ford did win Sussex County decisively by a 60–38 margin, Ford's strongest county by vote share was actually suburban Morris County, where he beat Carter 61–37. In suburban Monmouth County, Ford won 54–44. Other important victories for Ford were in fairly populated Ocean County, which he won 57–41, and Passaic County, which he won 51–46. However Ford's biggest prize was very heavily populated Bergen County, which went decisively to Ford by a 56–43 margin. This was the first time since 1916 that a Democrat won the presidency without Passaic County.

== See also ==
- United States presidential elections in New Jersey
- Presidency of Jimmy Carter
