= 1976 United States House of Representatives elections in New Jersey =

- November 2, 1976

All 15 New Jersey seats to the United States House of Representatives
- Turnout: 81% (▲19pp)
	Majority party	Minority party
Party	Democratic	Republican
Last election	12	3
Seats won	11	4
Seat change	▼1	▲1
Popular vote	1,538,658	1,217,932
Percentage	54.7%	43.3%
Swing	▼4.9pp	▲5.2pp
Democratic
50–60%
60–70%
Republican
40–50%
50–60%
60–70%

The 1976 United States House of Representatives elections in New Jersey were held on November 2, 1976, to determine who would represent the people of New Jersey in the United States House of Representatives. This election coincided with national elections for president of the United States, U.S. House and U.S. Senate. New Jersey had fifteen seats in the House, apportioned according to the 1970 United States census. Representatives are elected for two-year terms.

Despite major Republican efforts on winning back the four seats they lost to the Democratic Party in the 1974 elections, they unseated only one incumbent, Henry Helstoski, who had first been elected in 1964 but was facing a federal indictment for bribery. Freshman Democratic incumbents Jim Florio, Bill Hughes, Andrew Maguire, and Helen Stevenson Meyner were all re-elected.

In the 14th district, Democratic incumbent Dominick V. Daniels retired and was succeeded by Democratic state Assemblyman Joseph A. LeFante, who defeated an unexpectedly strong challenge on the basis of his support for the new state income tax.

== Overview ==
1976 United States House of Representatives elections in New Jersey
Party	Votes	Percentage	Candidates	Seats	+/–
Democratic	1,538,658	54.74%	15	11	▼1
Republican	1,217,932	43.33%	15	4	▲1
Libertarian	11,522	0.41%	10	0	Steady
US Labor	2,607	0.27%	6	0	Steady
American	1,796	0.06%	2	0	Steady
Socialist Workers	330	0.01%	1	0	Steady
Independents	37,948	1.35%	16	0	Steady
Totals	2,810,793	100.00%	65	15	Steady

== Background ==
In the 1974 House elections, four Republican incumbents were unseated by their Democratic opponents, giving the Democratic Party a 12–3 majority in the New Jersey delegation. Their losses were attributed to the nationwide Watergate scandal involving the incumbent Republican administration of President Richard Nixon. Republicans hoped to gain back all four seats. Thomas Kean, the former assembly speaker and state chair for Gerald Ford's presidential campaign, publicly declared, "If we don't defeat the Democratic incumbents at this time, the record shows that they will be nearly impossible to defeat later on." While the 1st district, which had elected Jim Florio, was considered a swing seat, the other four districts, the 2nd, 7th, and particularly the 13th, were considered Republican districts.

The Democratic incumbents ran on the back of Senator Harrison A. Williams, who was up for re-election to a fourth term and had regained popularity for his work as chair of the Senate Committee on Labor and Welfare, where he had authored successful legislation to increase the national minimum wage, provide mass transportation subsidies, and protect employee pensions. He was expected to win his race by a wide margin.

=== County line ===
In 1975, a new state law restored the right of county party organizations to endorse candidates in primary elections. This practice, known as the "county line," had been abolished during the governorship of Woodrow Wilson as a way to curb the influence of party bosses.

== District 1 ==
1976 New Jersey's 1st congressional district election
- November 2, 1976
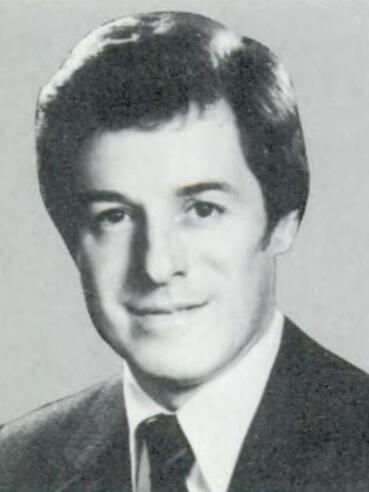

Nominee	James Florio	Joseph McCullough
Party	Democratic	Republican
Popular vote	136,624	56,363
Percentage	70.1%	28.9%
U.S. Representative before election
James Florio
Democratic
Elected U.S. Representative
James Florio
Democratic

Incumbent Democrat James Florio won. The district included Gloucester County and parts of Camden County.

=== Democratic primary ===
==== Candidates ====
- James Florio, incumbent representative since 1975

==== Results ====
1976 Democratic primary
Party	Candidate	Votes	%
Democratic	James Florio (incumbent)	32,525	100.00%
Total votes		32,525	100.00%

=== Republican primary ===
==== Candidates ====
- Joseph I. McCullough Jr., mayor of Haddon Heights

==== Results ====
1976 Republican primary
Party	Candidate	Votes	%
Republican	Joseph I. McCullough Jr.	13,513	100.00%
Total votes		13,513	100.00%

=== General election ===
==== Candidates ====
- Robert Bowen (Labor)
- James Florio, incumbent representative since 1975 (Republican)
- Joseph I. McCullough Jr., mayor of Haddon Heights (Republican)
- Thomas C. Sloan (New Majority)
- Vernon A. Smith (Libertarian)

==== Campaign ====
Despite the fact that the district had voted for Richard Nixon by a margin of over 60,000 in 1972, Jim Florio was considered the heavy favorite for re-election to a second term in office. The district had a growing popular of Italian Americans, including Florio himself, and was dominated by manufacturing and industrial labor in Camden and its surroundings.

Haddon Heights mayor Joseph McCullough, ran an aggressive and ambitious door-to-door campaign, knocking on 30,000 doors from April through October and wearing out seven pairs of shoes. He publicly speculated that "to win rather substantially in a traditionally Republican district... might project somebody onto the state scene." However, Florio remained extremely popular within the district and began his re-election campaign almost as soon as he won the seat in 1974, establishing district offices in both Camden and Gloucester counties and focusing on constituent services to raise his profile. During his first term, he obtained a $75 million Veterans Administration grant for a Camden hospital and passing legislation to qualify farmers for disaster relief loans following flooding. He had the uniform support of organized labor, including the New Jersey Education Association. McCullough admitted in October than his only endorsement was from the National Alliance of Senior Citizens, which Florio challenged as an "phony, letterhead organization" masquerading as the National Council of Senior Citizens.

Despite polling suggesting that Florio had an easy lead, he ran a full-time campaign in October, with scheduled appearances throughout the district from sunrise to midnight. The candidates participated in multiple debates, at which McCullough challenged Florio for accepting campaign contributions from special interests. While Florio admitted to accepting permitted donations from labor unions and businesses, he also pointed to his vote in favor of public financing for campaigns and said he would do so again if re-elected.

==== Results ====
1976 U.S. House election
Party	Candidate	Votes	%	±%
Democratic	James Florio (incumbent)	136,624	70.10%	
Republican	Joseph I. McCullough Jr.	56,363	28.92%	
Libertarian	Vernon A. Smith	800	0.41%	
Independent	Thomas C. Sloan	784	0.40%	
U.S. Labor	Robert Bowen	671	0.34%	
Total votes		194,898	100.00%	
Democratic hold		Swing	{{{swing}}}	

== District 2 ==
1976 New Jersey's 2nd congressional district election
- November 2, 1976
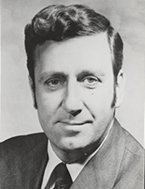

Nominee	William J. Hughes	James R. Hurley
Party	Democratic	Republican
Popular vote	141,753	87,915
Percentage	61.7%	38.3%
U.S. Representative before election
William J. Hughes
Democratic
Elected U.S. Representative
William J. Hughes
Democratic

Incumbent William J. Hughes won. This district, the largest in South Jersey, included all of Atlantic, Cape May, Cumberland, and Salem counties, and parts of Burlington and Ocean counties.

=== Democratic primary ===
==== Candidates ====
- Solveig I. Henschen, Bayville resident
- William J. Hughes, incumbent representative since 1975

==== Results ====
1976 Democratic primary
Party	Candidate	Votes	%
Democratic	William J. Hughes (incumbent)	23,230	89.51%
Democratic	Solveig I. Henschen	2,723	10.49%
Total votes		25,953	100.00%

=== Republican primary ===
==== Candidates ====
- Robert F. Dufala, nursery school owner and member of the John Birch Society
- James R. Hurley, assemblyman from Millville

==== Campaign ====
Dufala had the support of local Republican organizations.

==== Results ====
1976 Republican primary
Party	Candidate	Votes	%
Republican	James R. Hurley	32,948	86.24%
Republican	Robert F. Dufala	5,255	13.76%
Total votes		38,203	100.00%

==== Aftermath ====
After the primary, Dufala was arrested and indicted for conspiring to assassinate Vice President Nelson Rockefeller with a cyanide bullet. His attorneys claimed he was entrapped by an undercover Secret Service agent and had participated out of fear for his life, because the agent claimed to be a veteran political assassin in Vietnam and brandished a weapon. After his first trial ended in a hung jury, Dufala made a surprise guilty plea at his second trial. In November 1977, Judge Stanley Brotman gave him a suspended sentence of probation and court-mandated psychiatry.

=== General election ===
==== Candidates ====
- William J. Hughes, incumbent representative since 1975 (Democratic)
- James R. Hurley, assemblyman from Millville (Republican)

==== Campaign ====
Hughes sought to become the first Democratic incumbent to be re-elected from this district since the New Deal era. His opponent, James R. Hurley, had not lost an election in his decade-long political career, which began when he was elected a Cumberland County freeholder. Despite the district's fundamentally conservative lean, many of the district's voters were registered as independents. The region struggled with unemployment, particularly outside of tourist season.

Hughes, a former prosecutor, emphasized his support for the death penalty and opposition to government spending, including the use of public works as employment programs. His first term in Congress focused on supporting protections for Jersey Shore resort businesses against oil drilling and pollution, for which he was recognized by the Federation of Independent Businesses.

Hurley challenged Hughes as an unproductive legislator. Although the incumbent was the only Democratic candidate in the state without an endorsement from the AFL-CIO, the union also declined to support Hurley, and many union locals sided with Hughes. Hurley emphasized his opposition in the General Assembly to the new state income tax and his support for the legalization of casino gambling in Atlantic City. Hughes countered that these were state rather than federal issues and pointed out that he had supported casino gambling in 1974, when Hurley was opposed. He accused Hurley of "flip-flopping" on gambling to run in a district that included Atlantic City.

==== Results ====
1976 U.S. House election
Party	Candidate	Votes	%	±%
Democratic	William J. Hughes (incumbent)	141,753	61.72%	
Republican	James R. Hurley	87,915	38.28%	
Total votes		229,668	100.00%	
Democratic hold		Swing	{{{swing}}}	

== District 3 ==
1976 New Jersey's 3rd congressional district election
- November 2, 1976
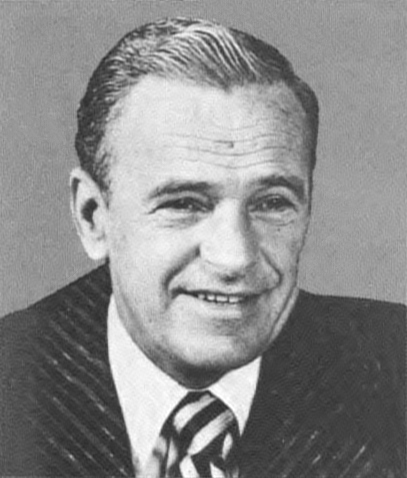

Nominee	James J. Howard	Ralph A. Siciliano
Party	Democratic	Republican
Popular vote	127,164	75,934
Percentage	62.1%	37.1%
U.S. Representative before election
James J. Howard
Democratic
Elected U.S. Representative
James J. Howard
Democratic

Incumbent Democrat James J. Howard won.

This district included parts of Monmouth and Ocean counties.

=== Democratic primary ===
==== Candidates ====
- James J. Howard, incumbent representative since 1965

==== Results ====
1976 Democratic primary
Party	Candidate	Votes	%
Democratic	James J. Howard (incumbent)	21,664	100.00%
Total votes		21,664	100.00%

=== Republican primary ===
==== Candidates ====
- Joseph L. Heimbold Jr., Monmouth Beach sales executive
- Ralph A. Siciliano, member of the Middletown township committee

==== Campaign ====
Heimbold ran as a conservative.

==== Results ====
1976 Republican primary
Party	Candidate	Votes	%
Republican	Ralph A. Siciliano	18,691	77.25%
Republican	Joseph L. Heimbold Jr.	5,504	22.75%
Total votes		24,195	100.00%

=== General election ===
==== Candidates ====
- James J. Howard, incumbent representative since 1965 (Democratic)
- Ralph A. Siciliano, member of the Middletown township committee (Republican)
- Walter M. Swirsky, sales consultant and executive secretary of the New Jersey Libertarian Party (Libertarian)

==== Campaign ====
Siciliano ran an uphill campaign against Howard, who had won re-election several times despite the district's strong Republican lean in most other elections. In an effort to break Howard's hold on the district, Siciliano focused his effort on the approximately 30,000 newly registered voters in the district.

Local issues played a role in the campaign, particularly problems with offshore pollution and oil drilling and a plan to move the Army electronics command from Fort Monmouth to the Washington, D.C. area. Although Siciliano attacked Howard for failing to prevent the earlier transfer of the Army Signal School out of the state, Eatontown mayor Joseph Frankel, who led a "Save the Fort" campaign, credited Howard with opposing the move effectively in Congress. Siciliano also cited the American Security Council, which had given Howard a rating of 0 on military spending. Howard claimed he had voted for all twenty-four defense and military spending bills during his term but had opposed legislation which would have expanded American involvement in the Vietnam War and Cambodia. He also noted that in response to the loss of the Signal School, he had secured the relocation of the Army Procurement Office from Philadelphia, resulting in a net loss of only about 100 jobs.

==== Results ====
1976 U.S. House election
Party	Candidate	Votes	%	±%
Democratic	James J. Howard (incumbent)	127,164	62.11%	
Republican	Ralph A. Siciliano	75,934	37.09%	
Libertarian	Walter M. Swirsky	1,641	0.80%	
Total votes		204,739	100.00%	
Democratic hold		Swing	{{{swing}}}	

== District 4 ==
1976 New Jersey's 4th congressional district election
- November 2, 1976
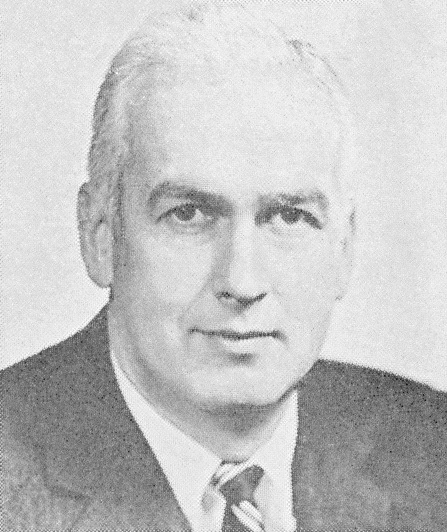

Nominee	Frank Thompson	Joseph S. Indyk
Party	Democratic	Republican
Popular vote	113,281	54,789
Percentage	66.3%	32.1%
U.S. Representative before election
Frank Thompson
Democratic
Elected U.S. Representative
Frank Thompson
Democratic

Incumbent Democrat Frank Thompson won. This district, in Central Jersey, consisted of parts of Burlington, Mercer, Middlesex, and Monmouth counties.

=== Democratic primary ===
==== Candidates ====
- Frank Thompson, incumbent representative since 1955

==== Results ====
1976 Democratic primary
Party	Candidate	Votes	%
Democratic	Frank Thompson (incumbent)	30,522	100.00%
Total votes		30,522	100.00%

=== Republican primary ===
==== Candidates ====
- Joseph S. Indyk, farmer and former mayor of Monroe Township

==== Results ====
1976 Republican primary
Party	Candidate	Votes	%
Republican	Joseph S. Indyk	10,271	100.00%
Total votes		10,271	100.00%

=== General election ===
==== Candidates ====
- Elliot Greenspan (Labor)
- Joseph S. Indyk, farmer and former mayor of Monroe Township (Republican)
- John Val Jean Mahalchik, populist gadfly and perennial candidate (Regular Democracy)
- Jack Moyers (Libertarian)
- Frank Thompson, incumbent representative since 1955 (Democratic)

==== Results ====
1976 U.S. House election
Party	Candidate	Votes	%	±%
Democratic	Frank Thompson (incumbent)	113,281	66.30%	
Republican	Joseph S. Indyk	54,789	32.07%	
Independent	John V. Mahalchik	1,431	0.84%	
Libertarian	Jack Moyers	946	0.55%	
U.S. Labor	Elliot Greenspan	421	0.25%	
Total votes		170,868	100.00%	
Democratic hold		Swing	{{{swing}}}	

== District 5 ==
1976 New Jersey's 5th congressional district election
- November 2, 1976
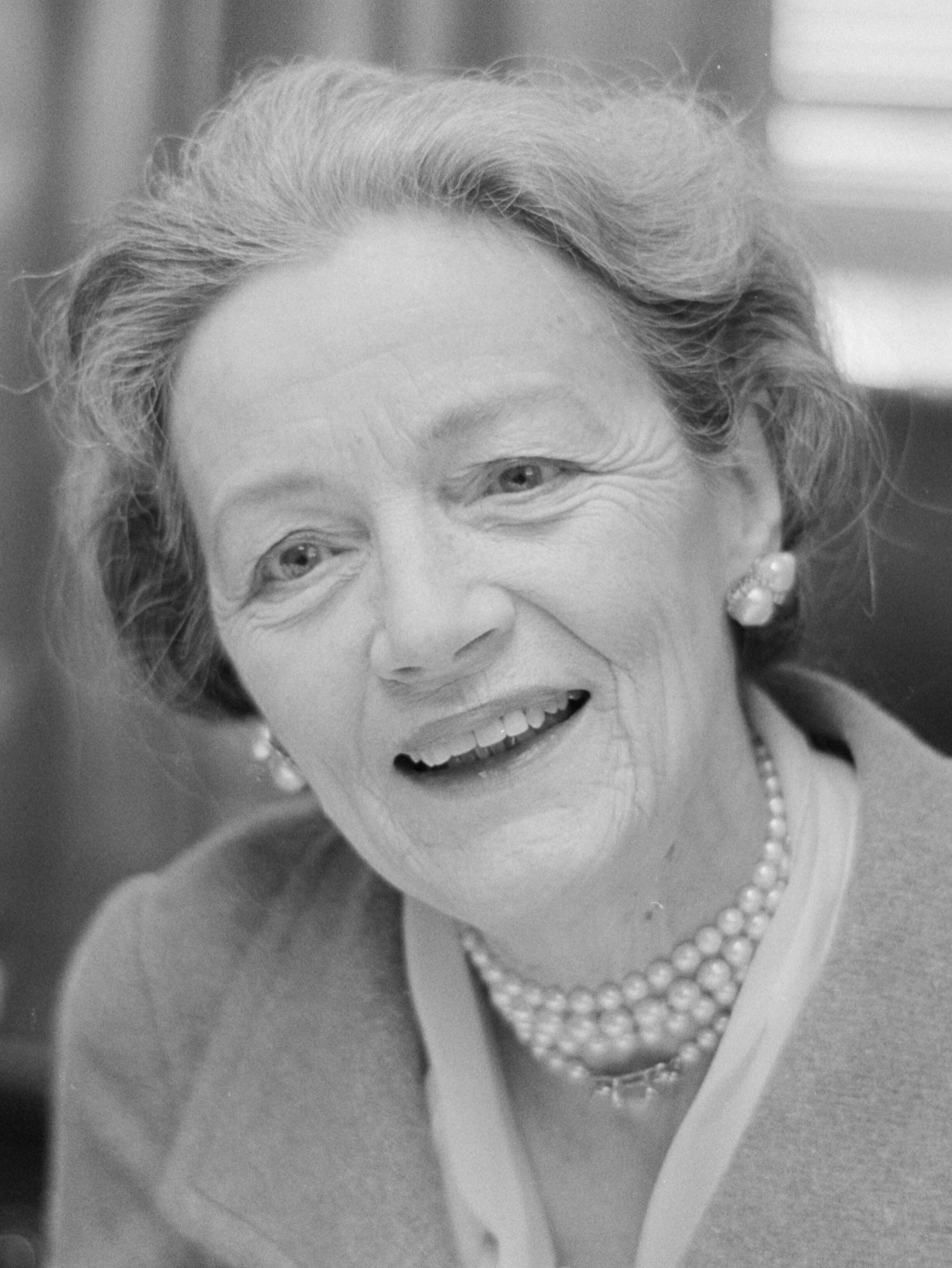

Nominee	Millicent Fenwick	Frank R. Nero
Party	Republican	Democratic
Popular vote	137,803	64,598
Percentage	72.6%	27.4%
U.S. Representative before election
Millicent Fenwick
Republican
Elected U.S. Representative
Millicent Fenwick
Republican

Incumbent Millicent Fenwick won. This district included Somerset County and parts of Essex, Mercer, Middlesex, and Morris counties.

=== Republican primary ===
==== Candidates ====
- Millicent Fenwick, incumbent representative since 1975

==== Results ====
1976 Republican primary
Party	Candidate	Votes	%
Republican	Millicent Fenwick (incumbent)	34,123	100.00%
Total votes		34,123	100.00%

=== Democratic primary ===
==== Candidates ====
- Frank R. Nero, Somerset County freeholder and former member of the North Plainfield borough council

==== Results ====
1976 Democratic primary
Party	Candidate	Votes	%
Democratic	Frank R. Nero	18,389	100.00%
Total votes		18,389	100.00%

=== General election ===
==== Candidates ====
- Millicent Fenwick, incumbent representative since 1975 (Republican)
- John Giammarco, candidate for this district in 1974 (Pro-Life)
- Frank R. Nero, Somerset County freeholder and former member of the North Plainfield borough council (Democratic)
- Jane T. Rehmke, laboratory technician and treasurer of the New Jersey Libertarian Party (Libertarian)
- Joseph R. Viola Jr. (Restoration)

==== Results ====
1976 U.S. House election
Party	Candidate	Votes	%	±%
Republican	Millicent Fenwick (incumbent)	137,803	66.86%	
Democratic	Frank R. Nero	64,598	31.34%	
Libertarian	Jane T. Rehmke	1,723	0.84%	
Independent	John Giammarco	1,483	0.72%	
Independent	Joseph R. Viola Jr.	499	0.24%	
Total votes		206,106	100.00%	
Republican hold		Swing	{{{swing}}}	

== District 6 ==
1976 New Jersey's 6th congressional district election
- November 2, 1976
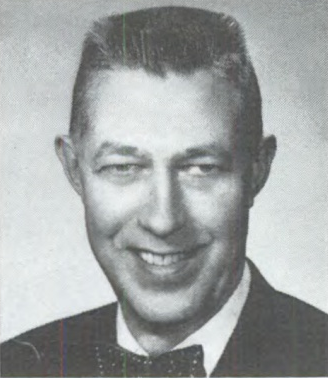

Nominee	Edwin B. Forsythe	Catherine A. Costa
Party	Republican	Democratic
Popular vote	125,920	85,053
Percentage	58.8%	39.7%
U.S. Representative before election
Edwin B. Forsythe
Republican
Elected U.S. Representative
Edwin B. Forsythe
Republican

This district included parts of Burlington, Camden, and Ocean counties.

Republican incumbent Edwin B. Forsythe won.

=== Republican primary ===
==== Candidates ====
- Edwin B. Forsythe, incumbent representative from Moorestown since 1970

==== Results ====
1976 Republican primary
Party	Candidate	Votes	%
Republican	Edwin B. Forsythe (incumbent)	21,462	100.00%
Total votes		21,462	100.00%

=== Democratic primary ===
==== Candidates ====
- Catherine A. Costa, Burlington County freeholder

==== Results ====
1976 Democratic primary
Party	Candidate	Votes	%
Democratic	Catherine A. Costa	21,630	100.00%
Total votes		21,630	100.00%

=== General election ===
==== Candidates ====
- Richard D. Amber (American)
- Samuel E. Brown, former government employee and vice chair of the New Jersey Libertarian Party (Libertarian)
- Joseph J. Byrne (Independent)
- Catherine A. Costa, Burlington County freeholder (Democratic)
- Edwin B. Forsythe, incumbent representative from Moorestown since 1970 (Republican)
- Marc David Silverstein (Individual Needs Center)

==== Results ====
1976 U.S. House election
Party	Candidate	Votes	%	±%
Republican	Edwin B. Forsythe (incumbent)	125,920	58.76%	
Democratic	Catherine A. Costa	85,053	39.69%	
American	Richard D. Amber	1,154	0.54%	
Libertarian	Samuel E. Brown	1,016	0.47%	
Independent	Joseph J. Byrne	933	0.44%	
Independent	Marc David Silverstein	228	0.11%	
Total votes		214,304	100.00%	
Republican hold		Swing	{{{swing}}}	

== District 7 ==
1976 New Jersey's 7th congressional district election
- November 2, 1976
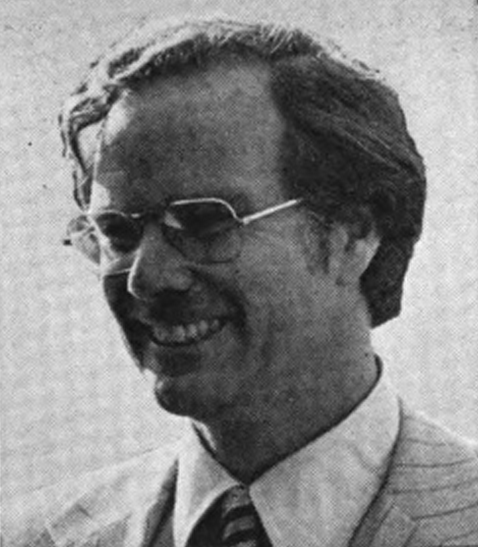

Nominee	Andrew Maguire	James J. Sheehan
Party	Democratic	Republican
Popular vote	120,526	92,624
Percentage	56.5%	43.5%
U.S. Representative before election
Andrew Maguire
Democratic
Elected U.S. Representative
Andrew Maguire
Democratic

This district included western parts of Bergen County.

Democratic incumbent Andrew Maguire was re-elected to a second term in office.

=== Democratic primary ===
==== Candidates ====
- Andrew Maguire, incumbent representative since 1975

==== Results ====
1976 Democratic primary
Party	Candidate	Votes	%
Democratic	Andrew Maguire (incumbent)	26,234	100.00%
Total votes		26,234	100.00%

=== Republican primary ===
==== Candidates ====
- James A. Quaremba, Ridgewood attorney and candidate for U.S. Senate in 1970
- James J. Sheehan, member of the Wyckoff township committee and former mayor
- Gerald L. Williams, Mahwah businessman

==== Campaign ====
James Quaremba, a corporate attorney for J. C. Penney and a graduate of Princeton, was the early favorite for the nomination. Had he won, he would have faced Maguire, his close personal friend and Ridgewood High School classmate, in the general election. His main challenger was former Wyckoff Mayor James J. Sheehan. Gerald Williams, a former member of the John Birch Society, was given little chance of winning. Sheehan was considered the more conservative of the two main candidates. Quaremba argued that as a moderate, he had a better chance of winning the general election.

The primary was part of a larger struggle over control of the ailing Bergen County Republican organization, which had been in decline since 1964. In that time, conservatives Barry Goldwater and Charles Sandman suffered two of the worst defeats in county history, and county chairmen Nelson G. Gross and Anthony J. Statile, who had returned the party to some degree of success, had each been indicted on separate criminal charges. Gross was convicted of perjury, while Statile's charges were dropped in March 1976. Statile backed Sheehan in the congressional primary over Quaremba, who had consistently criticized both Gross and Statile as leaders.

At the party convention, Sheehan narrowly defeated Quaremba, 203–200, for the party's endorsement and preferential ballot positioning. (Note: The 1976 Bergen County convention was one of the first in the state to award a county line via open vote of the full county committee.) Organization chair Richard Vander Platt called on Quaremba to withdraw, arguing that a divisive primary would weaken the eventual nominee. In response, Quaremba accused Statile and his allies of "repressive tactics." Quaremba and Vander Platt both skipped a subsequent dinner celebrating Statile's return to politics, but political leaders from throughout the state attended, and President Gerald Ford sent a congratulatory telegram.

The primary became increasingly bitter in April and May, after Statile announced that he would challenge Vander Platt for the chair of the county organization. Quaremba argued that the primary was a referendum on both Statile and the national presidential primary between Ford and former California governor Ronald Reagan. He also claimed that "shadowy characters with devious objectives" and anti-abortion activists were behind the Sheehan campaign. Sheehan declined to publicly take sides in either the county chair or presidential race, though he argued that Statile was not a political boss and shared many of Reagan's positions. Both candidates engaged in an aggressive door-to-door strategy in the final weeks of the campaign.

==== Results ====
1976 Republican primary
Party	Candidate	Votes	%
Republican	James J. Sheehan	14,603	48.43%
Republican	James A. Quaremba	11,293	37.45%
Republican	Gerald L. Williams	4,258	14.12%
Total votes		30,154	100.00%

=== General election ===
==== Candidates ====
- Andrew Maguire, incumbent representative since 1975 (Democratic)
- James J. Sheehan, member of the Wyckoff township committee (Republican)

==== Campaign ====
Sheehan was badly damaged by the Republican primary against Quaremba, and Maguire was favored for re-election before primary votes had been cast.

==== Results ====
1976 U.S. House election
Party	Candidate	Votes	%	±%
Democratic	Andrew Maguire (incumbent)	120,526	56.55%	
Republican	James J. Sheehan	92,624	43.45%	
Total votes		213,150	100.00%	
Democratic hold		Swing	{{{swing}}}	

== District 8 ==
1976 New Jersey's 8th congressional district election
- November 2, 1976
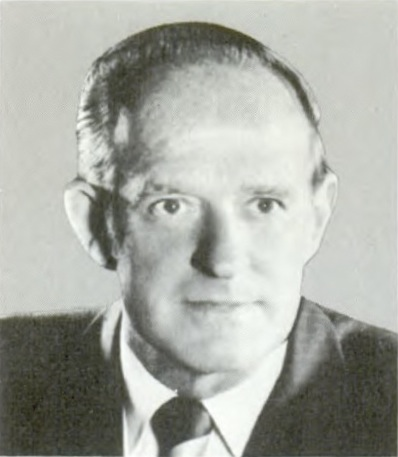

Nominee	Robert A. Roe	Bessie Doty
Party	Democratic	Republican
Popular vote	108,841	44,775
Percentage	70.6%	29.0%
U.S. Representative before election
Robert A. Roe
Democratic
Elected U.S. Representative
Robert A. Roe
Democratic

This district included parts of Bergen and Passaic counties.

Democratic incumbent Robert Roe won.

=== Democratic primary ===
==== Candidates ====
- Frances Aires, Clifton tax revolt activist
- Robert A. Roe, incumbent representative from Wayne since 1969

==== Results ====
1976 Democratic primary
Party	Candidate	Votes	%
Democratic	Robert A. Roe (incumbent)	15,149	87.82%
Democratic	Frances Aires	2,101	12.18%
Total votes		17,250	100.00%

=== Republican primary ===
==== Candidates ====
- Bessie Doty, member of the Wanaque borough council and former Passaic County freeholder

==== Results ====
1976 Republican primary
Party	Candidate	Votes	%
Republican	Bessie Doty	10,711	100.00%
Total votes		10,711	100.00%

=== General election ===
==== Candidates ====
- Gilbert G. Doll (Libertarian)
- Bessie Doty, member of the Wanaque borough council and former Passaic County freeholder (Republican)
- Robert A. Roe, incumbent representative from Wayne since 1969 (Democratic)

==== Results ====
1976 U.S. House election
Party	Candidate	Votes	%	±%
Democratic	Robert A. Roe (incumbent)	108,841	70.59%	
Republican	Bessie Doty	44,775	29.04%	
Libertarian	Gilbert G. Doll	580	0.38%	
Total votes		154,196	100.00%	
Democratic hold		Swing	{{{swing}}}	

== District 9 ==
1976 New Jersey's 9th congressional district election
- November 2, 1976
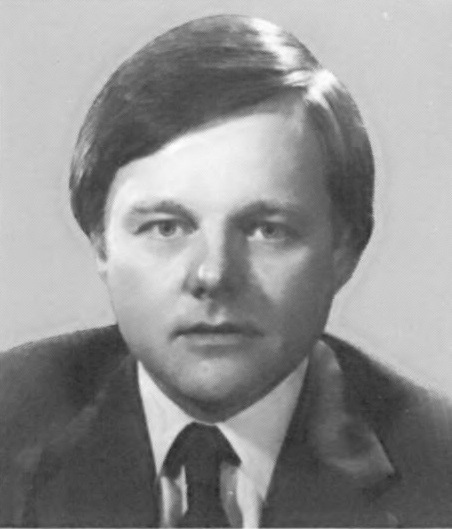

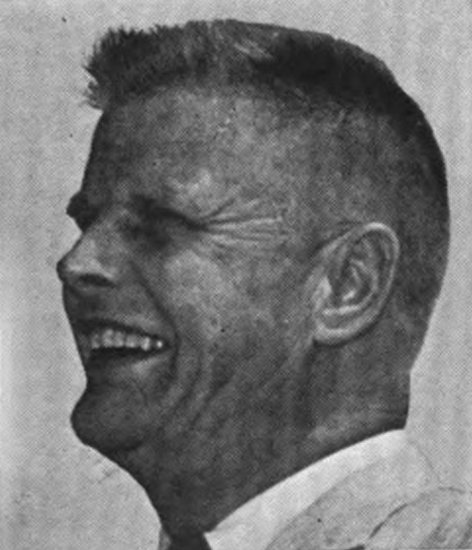
Nominee	Harold C. Hollenbeck	Henry Helstoski
Party	Republican	Democratic
Popular vote	107,454	89,723
Percentage	53.1%	44.3%
U.S. Representative before election
Henry Helstoski
Democratic
Elected U.S. Representative
Harold C. Hollenbeck
Republican

This district consisted of parts of Bergen and Hudson counties.

Democratic incumbent Henry Helstoski ran for a sixth term in office, despite facing a federal indictment on charges of bribery. He narrowly won the Democratic primary over Assemblyman Byron Baer but lost the general election to Republican nominee Harold C. Hollenbeck.

=== Background ===
In 1975, Henry Helstoski became the target of a federal corruption investigation. Over the next two years, he was subject to multiple investigations by four grand juries into charges that he had extorted illegal immigrants in return for sponsoring private bills to allow them to remain in the United States. In April 1976, his brother was convicted of filing a false income tax return, and his chief of staff pleaded guilty on extortion charges.

=== Democratic primary ===
==== Candidates ====
- Byron Baer, assemblyman from Englewood
- Henry Helstoski, incumbent representative since 1965 and candidate for governor in 1969
- Robert L. Mauro, Fairview resident

==== Campaign ====
Sensing Helstoski's vulnerability, assemblyman Byron Baer announced a challenge to the incumbent, whom he had previously supported.

Baer declined to seek the Bergen County Democratic organization endorsement at the party convention; it was awarded to Helstoski. In Hudson County, where 35 percent of the district's Democratic voters lived, Baer was granted the organization endorsement by party chair Bernard Hartnett, a reformer allied with Jersey City Mayor Paul T. Jordan.

On June 2, just days before the primary, a federal grand jury delivered a thirteen-count indictment against Helstoski. The indictment alleged that he had extorted illegal aliens from Chile and Argentina, obstructed the subsequent investigations "giving false and misleading testimony before the grand jury", and conspired to pressure other witnesses to lie. Baer spent the final days of the campaign hitting Helstoski hard and arguing that the shadow of criminal charges would make it difficult for him to be an effective legislator.

Helstoski referred to the investigation as "politically inspired", and brought a civil suit against United States attorney Jonathan L. Goldstein, which was dismissed.

==== Results and legal challenge ====
Although initial results showed a narrow victory for Helstoski by 106 votes, the election was immediately thrown into question when Hudson County officials impounded two thousand absentee ballots. Hudson County elections supervisor Jerome Lazarus, an ally of Hartnett, sought to recount the ballots over possible questions about their validity and claims of election fraud. Absentee ballots in North Bergen and Union City, where local political machines backed Helstoski, were cast heavily for the incumbent by a margin of 1,642–79. Baer challenged them as fraudulent, citing erasures and similarities in handwriting.

On June 24, Superior Court judge Thomas O'Brien ordered a recount of voting machines in North Bergen, resulting in a net gain of 200 votes for Baer, closing the gap.

1976 Democratic primary
Party	Candidate	Votes	%
Democratic	Henry Helstoski (incumbent)	19,814	46.50%
Democratic	Byron Baer	18,359	43.09%
Democratic	Robert L. Mauro	4,435	10.45%
Total votes		42,608	100.00%

==== Second primary ====
On August 11, judge John Marzulli ordered that a new primary should be held on September 21. Helstoski agreed. Despite his indictment, Helstoski campaigned aggressively in the second primary.

In the final result, Helstoski nearly doubled his majority from the initial primary.

=== Republican primary ===
==== Candidates ====
- Harold C. Hollenbeck, former state senator from East Rutherford

===== Withdrew =====
- Anne Armstrong, City University of New York political science professor (following Bergen County Republican convention)
- Ron Bogle, member of the Lyndhurst board of education (following Bergen County Republican convention)
- John Johl, former Haworth mayor (following Bergen County Republican convention)

==== Campaign ====
As in the 7th district, where James Quaremba ran against the party organization, Hollenbeck was a former antagonist of the Bergen County Republican organization under Nelson G. Gross and Anthony Statile. At the county convention, however, Hollenbeck won the organization endorsement and preferential ballot positioning over Lyndhurst school board member Ron Bogle, 70–67. John Johl received 40 votes and Anne Armstrong received 27. Following the convention, the other candidates withdrew, and Hollenbeck was unopposed on the primary ballot.

==== Results ====
1976 Republican primary
Party	Candidate	Votes	%
Republican	Harold C. Hollenbeck	14,109	100.00%
Total votes		14,109	100.00%

=== General election ===
==== Candidates ====
- Henry Helstoski, incumbent representative since 1965 and candidate for governor in 1969 (Democratic)
- Harold C. Hollenbeck, former state senator from East Rutherford (Republican)
- Frank J. Primich (Libertarian)
- Herbert H. Shaw, perennial candidate (Politicians Are Crooks)
- James J. Terlizzi Sr. (Independent Taxpayer's Watchdog)

==== Results ====
1976 U.S. House election
Party	Candidate	Votes	%	±%
Republican	Harold C. Hollenbeck	107,454	53.10%	
Democratic	Henry Helstoski (incumbent)	89,723	44.34%	
Independent	Herbert H. Shaw	1,814	0.90%	
Libertarian	Frank J. Primich	1,759	0.87%	
Independent	James J. Terlizzi Sr.	1,594	0.79%	
Total votes		202,344	100.00%	
Republican gain from Democratic		Swing	{{{swing}}}	

==== Aftermath ====
The Supreme Court of the United States later ruled that "legislative acts" could not be used as evidence against a criminal defendant, and Helstoski was never tried on bribery or extortion charges. He ran twice to regain his seat in 1978 and 1980.

== District 10 ==
1976 New Jersey's 10th congressional district election
- November 2, 1976
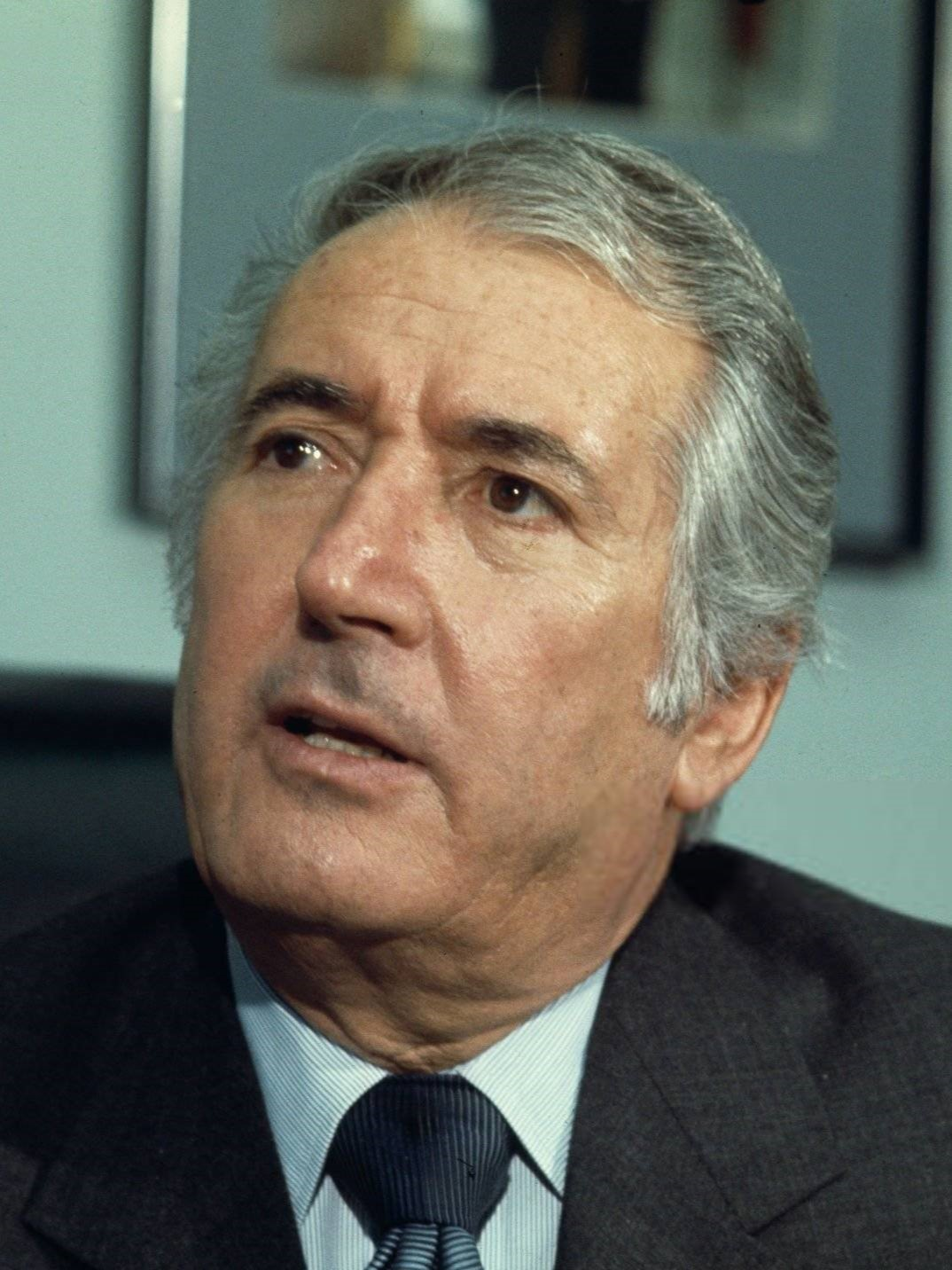

Nominee	Peter W. Rodino	Tony Grandison
Party	Democratic	Republican
Popular vote	88,245	17,129
Percentage	82.6%	16.0%
U.S. Representative before election
Peter W. Rodino
Democratic
Elected U.S. Representative
Peter W. Rodino
Democratic

The district included parts of Essex and Hudson counties.

Democratic incumbent Peter W. Rodino won.

=== Democratic primary ===
==== Candidates ====
- Peter W. Rodino, incumbent representative since 1949

==== Results ====
1976 Democratic primary
Party	Candidate	Votes	%
Democratic	Peter W. Rodino (incumbent)	30,681	100.00%
Total votes		30,681	100.00%

=== Republican primary ===
==== Candidates ====
- Tony Grandison, Newark Housing Authority supervisor

==== Results ====
1976 Republican primary
Party	Candidate	Votes	%
Republican	Tony Grandison	3,236	100.00%
Total votes		3,236	100.00%

=== General election ===
==== Candidates ====
- Tony Grandison, Newark Housing Authority supervisor (Republican)
- Charles Mack (Labor)
- Kathleen A. McAdam (Libertarian)
- Peter W. Rodino, incumbent representative since 1949 (Democratic)
- Lawrence Stewart (Socialist Workers)

==== Results ====
1976 U.S. House election
Party	Candidate	Votes	%	±%
Democratic	Peter W. Rodino (incumbent)	88,245	82.65%	
Republican	Tony Grandison	17,129	16.04%	
Libertarian	Kathleen A. McAdam	862	0.81%	
Socialist Workers	Lawrence Stewart	330	0.31%	
U.S. Labor	Charles Mack	209	0.20%	
Total votes		106,775	100.00%	
Democratic hold		Swing	{{{swing}}}	

== District 11 ==
1976 New Jersey's 11th congressional district election
- November 2, 1976
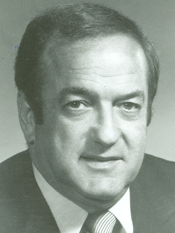

Nominee	Joseph Minish	Charles Poekel
Party	Democratic	Republican
Popular vote	129,026	59,397
Percentage	67.6%	31.1%
U.S. Representative before election
Joseph Minish
Democratic
Elected U.S. Representative
Joseph Minish
Democratic

This district consisted of parts of Bergen, Essex, Passaic, and Union counties.

Democratic incumbent Joseph Minish won.

=== Democratic primary ===
==== Candidates ====
- Joseph Minish, incumbent representative from West Orange since 1963

==== Results ====
1976 Democratic primary
Party	Candidate	Votes	%
Democratic	Joseph Minish (incumbent)	35,145	100.00%
Total votes		35,145	100.00%

=== Republican primary ===
==== Candidates ====
- Charles A. Poekel Jr., Essex Fells lawyer

==== Results ====
1976 Republican primary
Party	Candidate	Votes	%
Republican	Charles A. Poekel Jr.	12,163	100.00%
Total votes		12,163	100.00%

=== General election ===
==== Candidates ====
- Warren T. Kupchik (Libertarian)
- Joseph Minish, incumbent representative from West Orange since 1963 (Democratic)
- Charles A. Poekel Jr., Essex Fells lawyer (Republican)
- Joseph A. Rogers (Jobs, Equality, Peace)

==== Results ====
1976 U.S. House election
Party	Candidate	Votes	%	±%
Democratic	Joseph Minish (incumbent)	129,026	67.62%	
Republican	Charles A. Poekel Jr.	59,397	31.13%	
Libertarian	Warren T. Kupchik	1,749	0.92%	
Independent	Joseph A. Rogers	636	0.33%	
Total votes		190,808	100.00%	
Democratic hold		Swing	{{{swing}}}	

== District 12 ==
1976 New Jersey's 12th congressional district election
- November 2, 1976
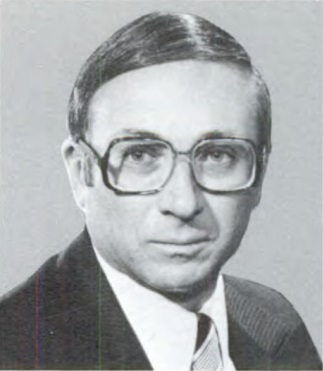

Nominee	Matt Rinaldo	Richard A. Buggelli
Party	Republican	Democratic
Popular vote	136,973	49,189
Percentage	73.1%	26.3%
U.S. Representative before election
Matt Rinaldo
Republican
Elected U.S. Representative
Matt Rinaldo
Republican

This district included parts of Union County.

Republican incumbent Matthew J. Rinaldo won.

=== Republican primary ===
==== Candidates ====
- Matt Rinaldo, incumbent representative from Union since 1973

==== Results ====
1976 Republican primary
Party	Candidate	Votes	%
Republican	Matt Rinaldo (incumbent)	23,363	100.00%
Total votes		23,363	100.00%

=== Democratic primary ===
==== Candidates ====
- Richard A. Buggelli, Union Township businessman
- A. Howard Freund, perennial candidate from Roselle Park

==== Campaign ====
Buggelli was considered a maverick, having supported the campaign of Republican conservative Charles Sandman for governor in 1973. Freund ran on his opposition to the state income tax.

==== Results ====
1976 Democratic primary
Party	Candidate	Votes	%
Democratic	Richard A. Buggelli	16,277	66.73%
Democratic	A. Howard Freund	8,114	33.27%
Total votes		24,391	100.00%

=== General election ===
==== Candidates ====
- Richard A. Buggelli, Union Township businessman (Democratic)
- Paul M. Geyer (American)
- Vincent Miskell (Labor)
- Matt Rinaldo, incumbent representative from Union since 1973 (Republican)

==== Results ====
1976 U.S. House election
Party	Candidate	Votes	%	±%
Republican	Matt Rinaldo (incumbent)	136,973	73.14%	
Democratic	Richard A. Buggelli	49,189	26.26%	
American	Paul M. Geyer	642	0.34%	
U.S. Labor	Vincent Miskell	478	0.26%	
Total votes		187,282	100.00%	
Republican hold		Swing	{{{swing}}}	

== District 13 ==
1976 New Jersey's 13th congressional district election
- November 2, 1976
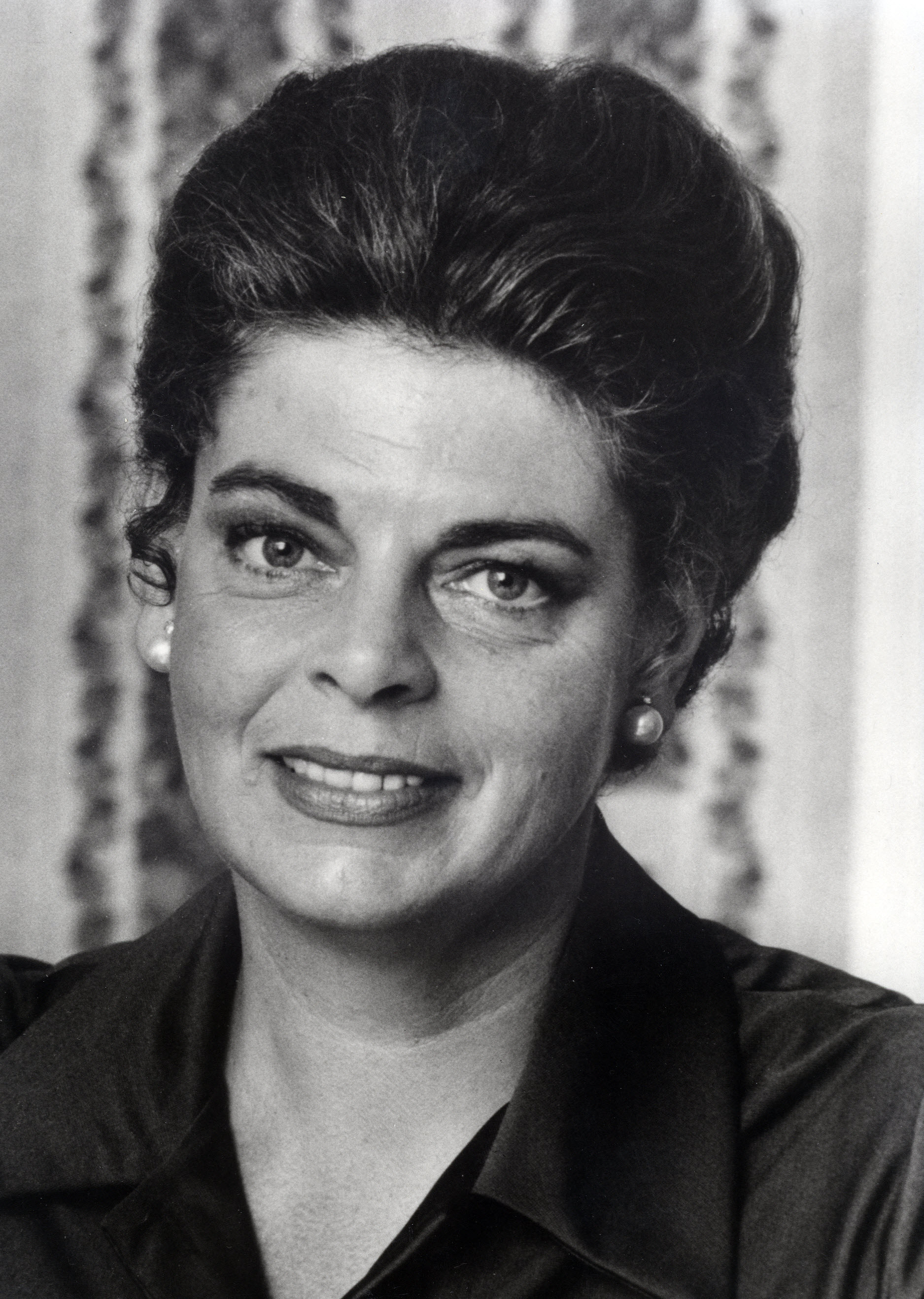

Nominee	Helen Stevenson Meyner	Bill Schluter
Party	Democratic	Republican
Popular vote	105,291	100,050
Percentage	50.4%	47.9%
U.S. Representative before election
Helen Stevenson Meyner
Democratic
Elected U.S. Representative
Helen Stevenson Meyner
Democratic

This sprawling district included Hunterdon, Sussex, and Warren counties, and parts of Mercer and Morris counties.

Democratic incumbent Helen Stevenson Meyner was re-elected to a second term in office over William E. Schluter.

=== Democratic primary ===
==== Candidates ====
- Edward J. Gaffney
- Helen Stevenson Meyner, incumbent representative since 1975 and former First Lady of New Jersey
- Ray Rollinson

==== Campaign ====
Meyner was opposed by two minor candidates. Edward J. Gaffney ran as an opponent of abortion. Rollinson, a political gadfly, also ran for president.

==== Results ====
1976 Democratic primary
Party	Candidate	Votes	%
Democratic	Helen S. Meyner (incumbent)	21,784	80.89%
Democratic	Edward J. Gaffney	3,605	13.39%
Democratic	Ray Rollinson	1,541	5.72%
Total votes		26,930	100.00%

=== Republican primary ===
==== Candidates ====
- Jay R. Rosner
- William E. Schluter, former state senator from Pennington

==== Results ====
1976 Republican primary
Party	Candidate	Votes	%
Republican	William E. Schluter	19,686	69.70%
Republican	Jay R. Rosner	3,190	30.30%
Total votes		28,244	100.00%

=== General election ===
==== Candidates ====
- F. Edward De Mott (Independent)
- Joseph Mayer (Consumer Action)
- Helen Stevenson Meyner, incumbent representative since 1975 and former First Lady of New Jersey (Democratic)
- William E. Schluter, former state senator from Pennington (Republican)

==== Results ====
1976 U.S. House election
Party	Candidate	Votes	%	±%
Democratic	Helen S. Meyner (incumbent)	105,291	50.37%	
Republican	William E. Schluter	100,050	47.86%	
Independent	F. Edward De Mott	2,160	1.03%	
Independent	Joseph Mayer	1,550	0.74%	
Total votes		209,051	100.00%	
Democratic hold		Swing	{{{swing}}}	

== District 14 ==
1976 New Jersey's 14th congressional district election
- November 2, 1976
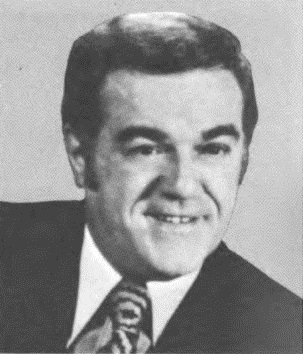

Nominee	Joseph A. LeFante	Anthony Louis Campenni
Party	Democratic	Republican
Popular vote	73,174	66,319
Percentage	49.9%	45.2%
U.S. Representative before election
Dominick V. Daniels
Democratic
Elected U.S. Representative
Joseph A. LeFante
Democratic

This district included parts of Hudson County.

Incumbent representative Dominick V. Daniels did not run for re-election to a tenth term in office. Democratic Assemblyman Joseph A. LeFante was elected to the open seat over Anthony Campenni.

=== Democratic primary ===
==== Candidates ====
- Joseph A. LeFante, assemblyman from Bayonne and speaker of the General Assembly

===== Declined =====
- Dominick V. Daniels, incumbent representative since 1959

==== Campaign ====
Daniels announced that he would not seek a tenth term in office one week before the deadline to file for the primary. The Hudson County Democratic organization endorsed Assembly Speaker Joseph A. LeFante to succeed him in a closed meeting of county leaders; the endorsement was considered tantamount to nomination.

==== Results ====
1976 Democratic primary
Party	Candidate	Votes	%
Democratic	Joseph A. LeFante	38,617	100.00%
Total votes		38,617	100.00%

=== Republican primary ===
==== Candidates ====
- Anthony Louis Campenni, Bayonne car dealer

==== Results ====
1976 Republican primary
Party	Candidate	Votes	%
Republican	Anthony Louis Campenni	3,722	100.00%
Total votes		3,722	100.00%

=== General election ===
==== Candidates ====
- Edward W. Bergonzi (Workers)
- Stuart Bronn (Labor)
- Anthony Louis Campenni, Bayonne car dealer (Republican)
- David L. Jones Jr. (Bring Us Together)
- Joseph A. LeFante, incumbent representative since 1979 (Democratic)
- Kenneth C. McCarthy (Individual Americans Independence)
- Robert Ryley (Libertarian)

==== Campaign ====
Despite the overwhelming Democratic advantage in the district, Campenni ran an aggressive campaign criticizing LeFante for his legislative work to establish the first state income tax.

==== Results ====
Initial results showed LeFante leading by a relatively slim margin of 6,855 votes. A recount was ordered, and Campenni challenged the validity of around four thousand absentee ballots. Despite his eventual defeat, Campenni's surprisingly strong performance in an otherwise Democratic district was expected to lead Republicans to emphasize the state income tax in the 1977 gubernatorial election.

1976 U.S. House election
Party	Candidate	Votes	%	±%
Democratic	Joseph A. LeFante	73,174	49.86%	
Republican	Anthony Louis Campenni	66,319	45.19%	
Independent	Kenneth C. McCarthy	3,979	2.71%	
Independent	David L. Jones Jr.	1,969	1.34%	
U.S. Labor	Stuart Bronn	452	0.31%	
Libertarian	Robert Ryley	446	0.30%	
Independent	Edward W. Bergonzi	429	0.29%	
Total votes		146,768	100.00%	
Democratic hold		Swing	{{{swing}}}	

== District 15 ==
1976 New Jersey's 15th congressional district election
- November 2, 1976
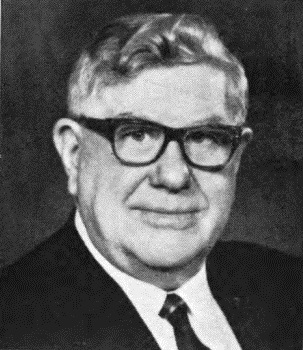

Nominee	Edward J. Patten	Charles W. Wiley	Dennis F. Adams Sr.
Party	Democratic	Republican	Independent
Popular vote	106,170	54,487	14,543
Percentage	59.0%	30.3%	8.1%
U.S. Representative before election
Edward J. Patten
Democratic
Elected U.S. Representative
Edward J. Patten
Democratic

This district included parts of Middlesex and Union counties. Democratic incumbent Edward J. Patten was re-elected to an eighth term in office.

=== Democratic primary ===
==== Candidates ====
- Edward J. Patten, incumbent representative since 1963

==== Results ====
1976 Democratic primary
Party	Candidate	Votes	%
Democratic	Edward J. Patten (incumbent)	32,657	100.00%
Total votes		32,657	100.00%

=== Republican primary ===
==== Candidates ====
- Charles W. Wiley, freelance journalist

==== Results ====
1976 Republican primary
Party	Candidate	Votes	%
Republican	Charles W. Wiley	6,379	100.00%
Total votes		6,379	100.00%

=== General election ===
==== Candidates ====
- Dennis F. Adams Sr. (Silent Majority)
- Michael Klein (People's Independent)
- Edward J. Patten, incumbent representative since 1963 (Democratic)
- Bruce E. Todd (Labor)
- Charles W. Wiley, freelance journalist (Republican)

==== Results ====
1976 U.S. House election
Party	Candidate	Votes	%	±%
Democratic	Edward J. Patten	106,170	59.04%	
Republican	Charles W. Wiley	54,487	30.30%	
Independent	Dennis F. Adams Sr.	14,543	8.09%	
Independent	Michale Klein	3,916	2.18%	
U.S. Labor	Bruce E. Todd	720	0.40%	
Total votes		179,836	100.00%	
Democratic hold		Swing	{{{swing}}}	
