= Stephans =

Stephans is a surname. Notable people with the surname include:

- Anton Stephans
- Jack Stephans (1939–2020), American football coach
- John Stephans (1921–1984), American basketball player
- Lydia Stephans (born 1960), American skater
- Michael Stephans (born 1945), American jazz musician
- Mike Stephans, American football player
