= Memorial High School (West New York, New Jersey) =

High school in Hudson County, New Jersey, US

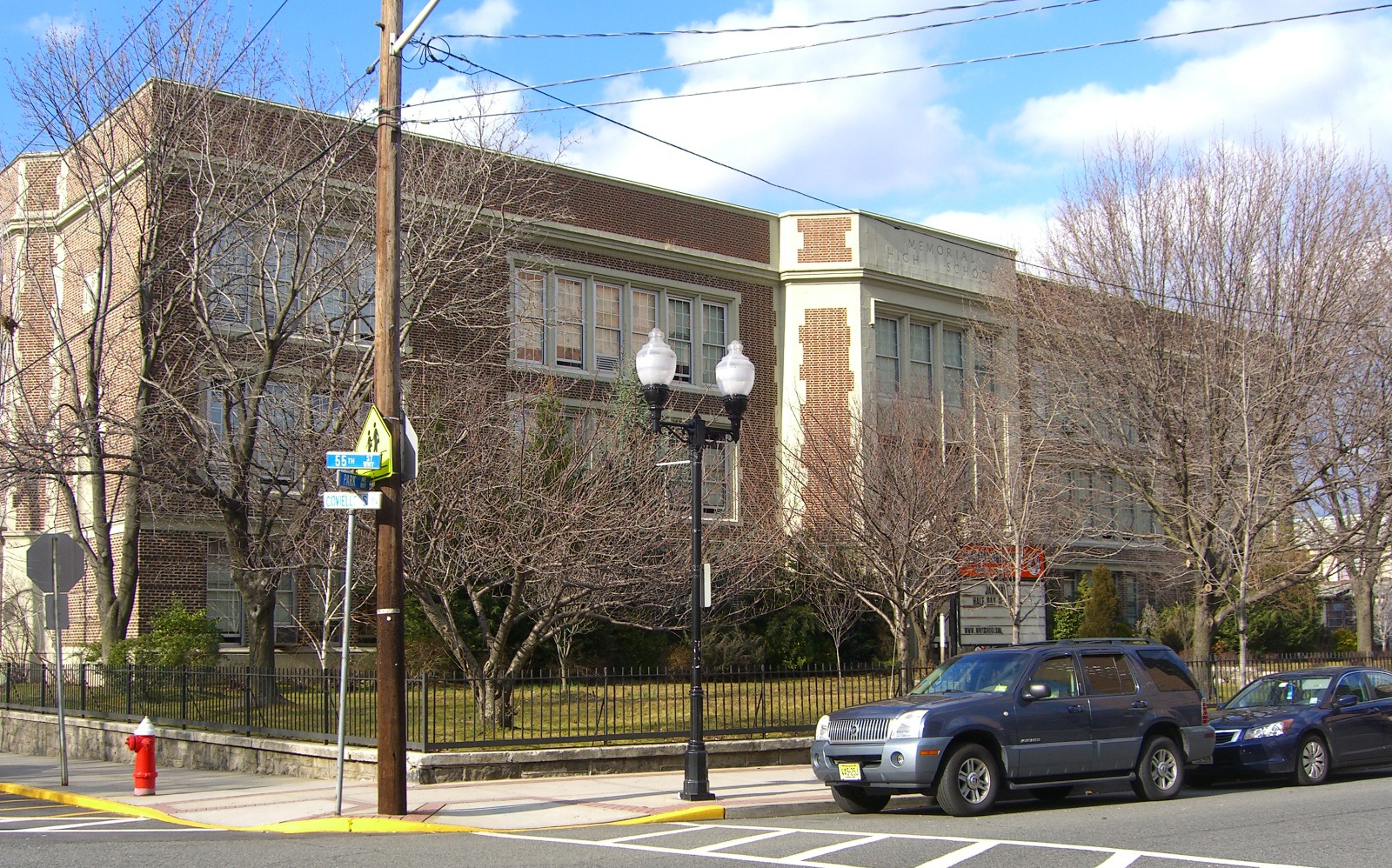

Location
- 5501 Park Avenue; West New York, Hudson County, New Jersey 07093; United States; 40.7832°N 74.0121°W

Information
- Type: Public high school
- Established: September 1926
- School district: West New York School District
- NCES School ID: 341758002938
- Principal: Brian Cooney
- Faculty: 149.0 FTEs
- Grades: 9-12
- Enrollment: 2,345 (as of 2024–25)
- Student to teacher ratio: 15.7:1
- Colors: Black; Orange and white
- Athletics conference: Hudson County Interscholastic League (general); North Jersey Super Football Conference (football)
- Team name: Tigers
- Rival: North Bergen High School
- Website: mhs-1.wnyschools.net

Memorial High School is a four-year comprehensive public high school in West New York, in Hudson County, in the U.S. state of New Jersey, serving students in ninth through twelfth grades. The school is the lone secondary school of the West New York School District, an Abbott district that serves all of West New York. The school has been accredited by the Middle States Association of Colleges and Schools Commission on Elementary and Secondary Schools since 1970; the school's accreditation expires in July 2029.

As of the 2024–25 school year, the school had an enrollment of 2,345 students and 149.0 classroom teachers (on an FTE basis), for a student–teacher ratio of 15.7:1. There were 1,757 students (74.9% of enrollment) eligible for free lunch and 222 (9.5% of students) eligible for reduced-cost lunch.

== History ==
Memorial High School was established in September 1926.

In 2005, the New Jersey Schools Development Authority determined that the Memorial High School building was equipped to hold 918 students, making the school 882 students over capacity. In January 2012, the NJSDA forwarded the West New York Board of Education's application for the purchase of St. Joseph of the Palisades Elementary School to Vatican City, with which West New York hopes to turn into a "freshman/sophomore academy" to house between 700 and 800 of the high school's students. Upon the anticipated papal approval of the purchase of the school, which belongs to the Roman Catholic Archdiocese of Newark, the SDA will make a final decision on development plans.

In March 2012, the portion of 56th Street in front of the school was dedicated as Rebeka Verea Way, in tribute to Rebeka Verea, who died in a car accident in North Bergen the night of her graduation in 2005. Though she graduated from Cliffside Park High School, her father runs a medical practice based in West New York, and is the chief medical officer at North Hudson Community Action Corporation, which is also based in West New York.

== Awards, recognition and rankings ==
In 2011, the College Board recognized Memorial High School as the 2011 winner of its "AP District of the Year Award" in the small schools category, in recognition of the district's efforts to expand the scope of Advanced Placement courses offered in the school and the improved results of those taking AP exams, with the school offering about 10 different AP courses after it started its first AP class in the 1980s.

The school was the 280th-ranked public high school in New Jersey out of 339 schools statewide in New Jersey Monthly magazine's September 2014 cover story on the state's "Top Public High Schools", using a new ranking methodology. The school had been ranked 307th in the state of 328 schools in 2012, after being ranked 273rd in 2010 out of 322 schools listed. The magazine ranked the school 282nd in 2008 out of 316 schools. The school was ranked 261st in the magazine's September 2006 issue, which surveyed 316 schools across the state. Schooldigger.com ranked the school 204th out of 376 public high schools statewide in its 2010 rankings (a decrease of 42 positions from the 2009 rank) which were based on the combined percentage of students classified as proficient or above proficient on the language arts literacy and mathematics components of the High School Proficiency Assessment (HSPA).

== Athletics ==
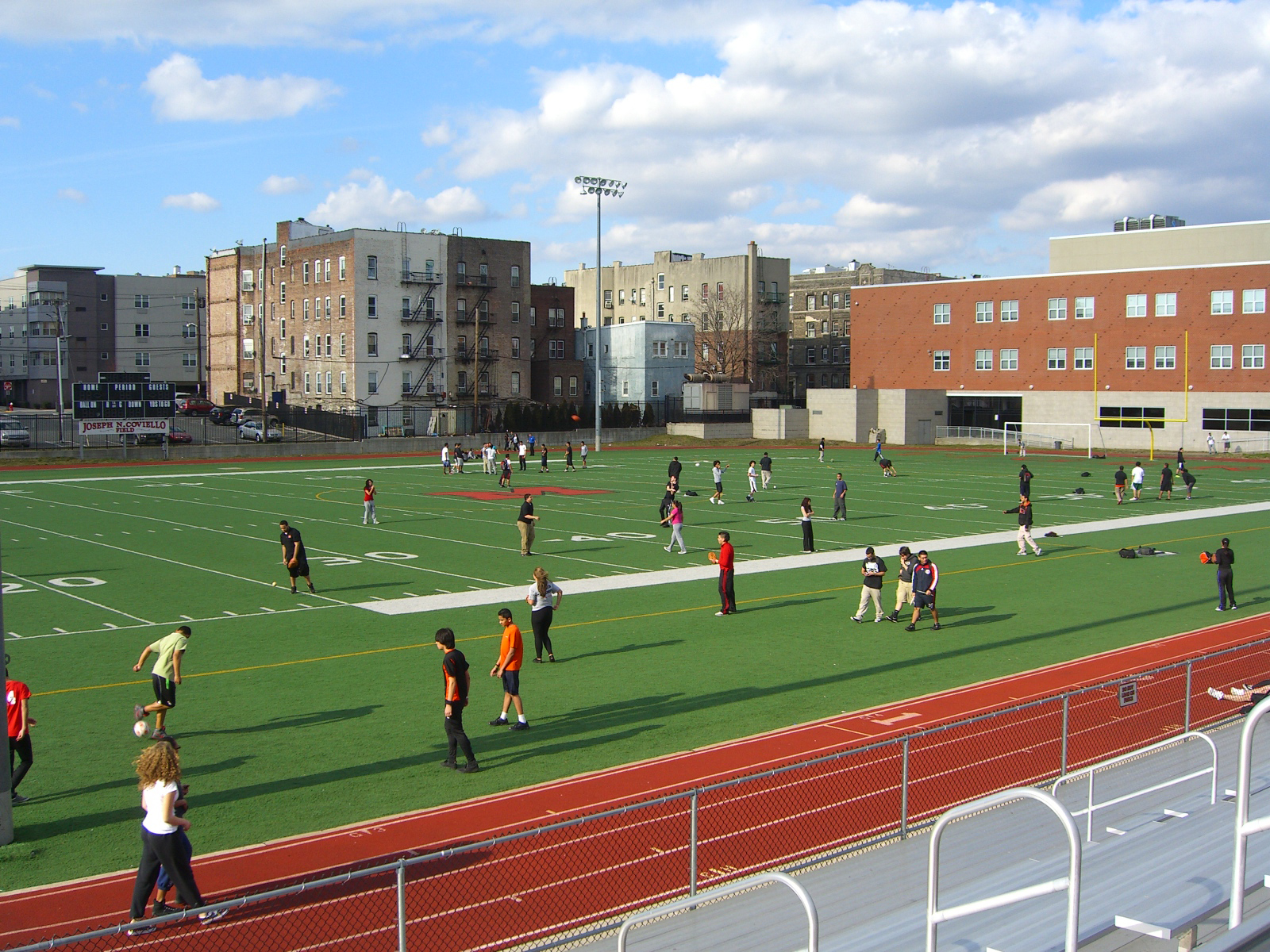
Students using the athletic field at Memorial Park

The Memorial High School Tigers compete in the Hudson County Interscholastic League (HCIAA), which is comprised of public and private high schools in Hudson County, and was established following a reorganization of sports leagues in Northern New Jersey by the New Jersey State Interscholastic Athletic Association. With 1,502 students in grades 10–12, the school was classified by the NJSIAA for the 2019–20 school year as Group IV for most athletic competition purposes, which included schools with an enrollment of 1,060 to 5,049 students in that grade range. The football team competes in the Ivy Red division of the North Jersey Super Football Conference, which includes 112 schools competing in 20 divisions, making it the nation's biggest football-only high school sports league. The football team is one of the 12 programs assigned to the two Ivy divisions starting in 2020, which are intended to allow weaker programs ineligible for playoff participation to compete primarily against each other. The school was classified by the NJSIAA as Group V North for football for 2024–2026, which included schools with 1,317 to 5,409 students.

The boys' basketball team won the Group IV state championship in 1939 (defeating Bloomfield High School in the tournament final) and 1942 (vs. Asbury Park High School), and won the Group III title in 1966 (vs. Sterling High School). The 1933 team won the Group IV state title with a 50–33 win against Bloomfield in the championship game played before a crowd of 4,000. In 2002, the team won the North I Group IV state title, defeating Hackensack High School 65–62.

The boys track team won the Group IV spring / outdoor track state championship in 1957.

The boys' track team won the Group III indoor relay state championship in 1974.

The boys cross country running team won the Group IV state championship in 1978.

The boys' baseball team won the Group IV state title in 1988 against Madison Central High School in the title game. In 2001, the team made it to the finals of the North I Group IV state tournament, falling to rival North Bergen High School by a score of 4–3 in the final game.

== School clubs ==
Clubs and extracurricular program include:

- M.O.M.S. (My Outreach Mission)
- School Band
- Future Business Leaders Of America (FBLA)
- National Honors Society
- School Chorus
- Football
- Boys/Girls Basketball Softball
- Boys/Girls Soccer
- Boys/Girls Volleyball
- Boys/Girls Tennis
- Boys/Girls Cross Country
- Boys/Girls Indoor And Outdoor Track
- Cheerleading
- Boys/Girls Bowling
- Color Guard
- Boys/Girls Swimming
- Tiger Gaming Alliance
- Chorus
- Tiger TV
- Band/Marching Band
- Gay Straight Alliance
- Art/Photography Spanish Club Orchestra
- Academic Bowl
- Audio/Visual - Video Club
- Literature Club
- National Honor Society
- Chess Club
- Choraliers
- Italian Club
- Spanish Club
- Math Club
- The Memo
- Nova
- TIGS
- Peer Club
- Student Council
- Yearbook Staff
- Academic Bowl
- Youth Alive
- Baking Club
- Video Club
- Student Council
- Together In Greatness (TIGs)

== Administration ==
The school's principal is Brian Cooney. His core administration team includes the school's four assistant principals.

== Notable alumni ==
- George Alvarez, actor known for his work on the soap operas General Hospital, Port Charles and Guiding Light
- Jose Arango (born 1957), politician who represented the 33rd Legislative District in the New Jersey General Assembly from 1984 to 1986
- Warren Boroson (1935–2023), financial journalist, author and playwright
- Sebastian Capozucchi (born 1995), professional footballer who plays as a defender for USL League One club Chattanooga Red Wolves
- Frank Cumiskey (1912–2004), Olympic silver medal-winning, five-time United States All-Around champion gymnast
- Vincent J. Dellay (1907–1999), represented New Jersey's 14th congressional district in the United States House of Representatives from 1957 to 1959
- Alan Gewirth (1912–2004, class of 1930), philosopher, a professor of philosophy at the University of Chicago and author of Reason and Morality
- John Mahnken (1922–2000), former professional basketball player
- April Jeanette Mendez (born 1987, class of 2005), professional wrestler who works for WWE under the ring name AJ Lee
- Nelson J. Perez (born 1961), prelate of the Roman Catholic Church who serves as the 10th archbishop of the Archdiocese of Philadelphia
- Gene Prebola (1938–2021), football tight end who played for the Oakland Raiders and the Denver Broncos
- Louis Romano (1930–2020), politician who represented the 33rd Legislative District in the New Jersey General Assembly from 1992 to 2000
- Nicholas Sacco (born 1946), politician, who has served as mayor of North Bergen and in the New Jersey Senate, where he represents the New Jersey's 32nd legislative district
- Albio Sires (born 1951), Member of the United States House of Representatives from New Jersey's 8th congressional district
- John Skevin (1927–1993), politician who served in both houses of the New Jersey Legislature
- Jack Stephans (1939–2020, class of 1957), head football coach at Jersey City State College, William Paterson University and Fordham University
- Isabel Toledo (1960-2019), fashion designer
- Anthony P. Vainieri (born 1928), politician who served in the New Jersey General Assembly from the 32nd Legislative District from 1984 to 1986
- Silverio Vega (born 1956), former mayor of West New York, who served in the New Jersey General Assembly and on the Hudson County Board of Chosen Freeholders
- Armando Vilaseca, Commissioner of the Vermont Department of Education
- Larry Wainstein, politician who was elected to represent the 33rd Legislative District in the New Jersey General Assembly in 2025
- Jacqueline Walker (born 1941), politician who served in the New Jersey General Assembly from 1984 to 1986
- Warren Wolf (1927–2019), Memorial High School football player and assistant coach, longtime Brick Township High School football coach, and politician
