= Oscar L. Auf der Heide =

American businessman and politician

Oscar Louis Auf der Heide
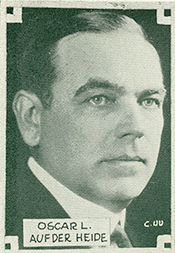
- From 1925's Pictorial Directory of the Sixty-Ninth Congress

Member of the U.S. House of Representatives from New Jersey
- In office March 4, 1925 – January 3, 1935
- Preceded by: John J. Eagan
- Succeeded by: Edward J. Hart
- Constituency: 11th district (1925–33); 14th district (1933–35)

Member of the New Jersey General Assembly
- In office 1908–1911

Personal details
- Born: December 8, 1874 New York City, New York, U.S.
- Died: March 29, 1945 (aged 70) West New York, New Jersey, U.S.
- Party: Democratic

Oscar Louis Auf der Heide (December 8, 1874 – March 29, 1945) was an American businessman and Democratic Party politician who represented New Jersey in the United States House of Representatives for five terms from 1925 to 1935.

== Early life and career ==
Auf der Heide was born in New York City on December 8, 1874, and attended the public schools. He moved with his parents to West New York, New Jersey, in 1887, where he later was engaged in the real estate business.

== Political career ==
He was a member of the town council from 1899 to 1902, and was a member and president of the board of education of the West New York School District in 1903–04. Auf der Heide was a member of the New Jersey General Assembly from 1908 to 1911. He served on the board of assessors of West New York in 1912 and 1913 and was Mayor of West New York, New Jersey, from 1914 to 1917. He was elected as a member and subsequently a director of the Hudson County Board of Chosen Freeholders, serving in office from 1915 to 1924.

=== Congress ===
Auf der Heide was elected as a Democrat to the Sixty-ninth Congress and to the four succeeding Congresses, serving in office from March 4, 1925, until January 3, 1935. In redistricting following the 1930 United States census, he was shifted to the newly created 14th congressional district. He was not a candidate for renomination in 1934 to the Seventy-fourth Congress.

== Death ==
After leaving Congress, he resumed the real estate and insurance business.

He died in West New York, New Jersey, on March 29, 1945, aged 70, and was interred in Hoboken Cemetery in North Bergen.

U.S. House of Representatives
Preceded by John J. Eagan	Member of the U.S. House of Representatives from New Jersey's 11th congressional district March 4, 1925 – March 3, 1933	Succeeded by Peter Angelo Cavicchia
Preceded by New District	Member of the U.S. House of Representatives from New Jersey's 14th congressional district March 4, 1933 – January 3, 1935	Succeeded by Edward J. Hart
