= Thomas Tumulty =

Thomas Tumulty may refer to:

- T. James Tumulty, American lawyer and politician
- Tom Tumulty, American football player
