= Vincent J. Dellay =

American politician

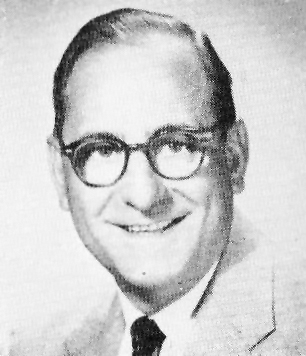

Member of the U.S. House of Representatives from New Jersey's 14th district
- In office January 3, 1957 – January 3, 1959
- Preceded by: T. James Tumulty
- Succeeded by: Dominick V. Daniels

Personal details
- Born: Vincent John Dellay; June 23, 1907 Union City, New Jersey, US
- Died: April 16, 1999 (aged 91) Hasbrouck Heights, New Jersey, US
- Resting place: Arlington National Cemetery
- Party: Republican, then Democratic

Vincent John Dellay (June 23, 1907, Union City, New Jersey – April 16, 1999, Hasbrouck Heights, New Jersey) was an American banker, World War II veteran, and politician who represented New Jersey's 14th congressional district in the United States House of Representatives for one term from 1957 to 1959.

Originally elected as a Republican, Dellay announced in 1957 that he would support Democratic candidate Robert B. Meyner for Governor of New Jersey and would caucus with the Democrats in Congress.

== Early life and career ==
Dellay was born to Italian immigrant parents in what is now Union City, New Jersey on June 23, 1907. He was a longtime resident of West New York, New Jersey. Dellay was educated in West New York High School, New York Evening High School, and the American Institute of Banking. He rose from messenger to bookkeeper at Irving Trust, New York City from 1923 to 1929; was assistant comptroller, Sterling National Bank & Trust Co., New York City, from 1929-1936; and an auditor with the New Jersey Department of the Treasury from 1936-1956.

=== World War II ===
During World War II, Dellay served in the United States Navy from 1944-1945 and in the New Jersey National Guard from 1949-1960.

== Congress ==
Dellay was an unsuccessful candidate for election to the Eighty-fourth Congress in 1954. He was elected as a Republican to the Eighty-fifth Congress, serving in office from January 3, 1957 to January 3, 1959.

Dellay voted in favor of the Civil Rights Act of 1957.

=== Party change ===
He decided to change political affiliation from Republican to Democrat during the Eighty-fifth Congress. He was an unsuccessful candidate for nomination as an Independent to the Eighty-sixth Congress.

== Death ==
He was a field auditor for the New Jersey Department of the Treasury until his retirement in 1971.

A resident of Hasbrouck Heights, New Jersey, Dellay died at the age of 91 on April 16, 1999, at Hackensack University Medical Center. He was interred in Arlington National Cemetery in Arlington, Virginia.

U.S. House of Representatives
Preceded by T. James Tumulty	Member of the U.S. House of Representatives from New Jersey's 14th congressional district January 3, 1957 – January 3, 1959	Succeeded by Dominick V. Daniels
