= Archibald E. Olpp =

American politician

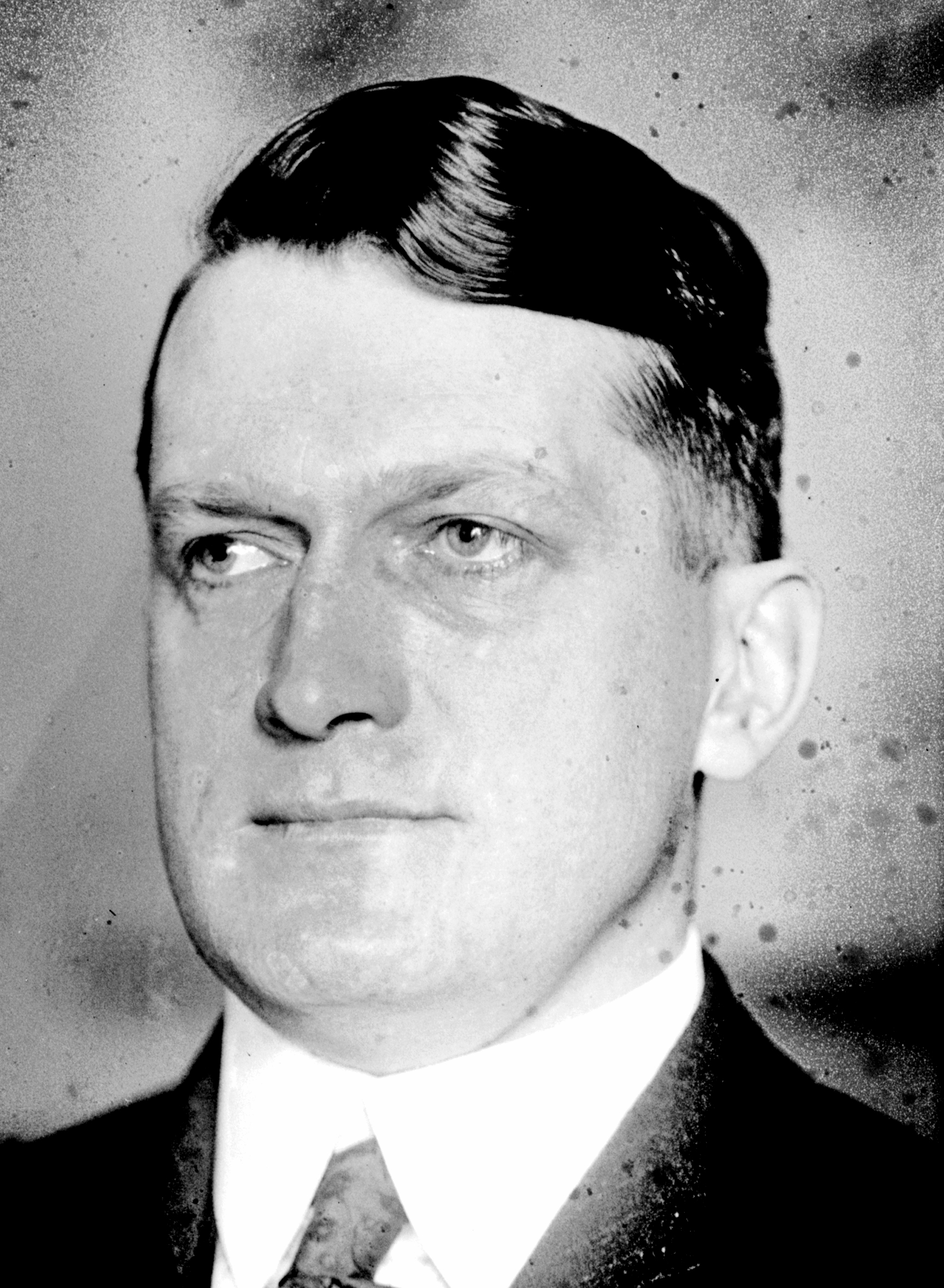

Member of the U.S. House of Representatives from New Jersey's 11th district
- In office March 4, 1921 – March 3, 1923
- Preceded by: John J. Eagan
- Succeeded by: John J. Eagan

Personal details
- Born: Archibald Ernest Olpp; May 12, 1882 South Bethlehem, Pennsylvania, U.S.
- Died: July 26, 1949 (aged 67) Hackensack, New Jersey, U.S.
- Party: Republican
- Education: Lehigh University; University of Pennsylvania

Archibald Ernest Olpp (May 12, 1882 – July 26, 1949) was an American physician and politician who served a single term in the U.S. representative from New Jersey. He was the first Republican to be elected to Congress from the New Jersey's 11th congressional district since it was created in 1913.

== Biography ==
Born in South Bethlehem, Pennsylvania, Olpp attended the public schools. He graduated from the Moravian School, Bethlehem, Pennsylvania, in 1899, Lehigh University, Bethlehem, Pennsylvania, in 1903, and from the medical department of the University of Pennsylvania at Philadelphia in 1908.

Olpp was an instructor in chemistry at Lehigh University in 1903 and 1904 and in biological chemistry at the Columbia University College of Physicians and Surgeons, New York City, in 1908 and 1909.

Olpp began the practice of medicine in West Hoboken, New Jersey, in 1909. He served as town physician (1912–1914) and police surgeon and physician to public schools in Secaucus, New Jersey (1916 to 1924).

He served as first lieutenant in the United States Medical Corps during World War I era.

Olpp was elected as a Republican for a single term to the Sixty-seventh Congress (March 4, 1921 – March 3, 1923). Following an unsuccessful reelection bid in 1922, Olpp resumed his medical career.

A resident of Cliffside Park, New Jersey, Olpp died at the age of 67 at Hackensack Hospital on July 26, 1949, after having collapsed in front of a building in Hasbrouck Heights. He was interred in Brookside Cemetery, Englewood, New Jersey.

U.S. House of Representatives
Preceded by John J. Eagan	Member of the U.S. House of Representatives from New Jersey's 11th congressional district March 4, 1921 – March 3, 1923	Succeeded by John J. Eagan
