= Frank J. Guarini =

American politician (1924–2026)

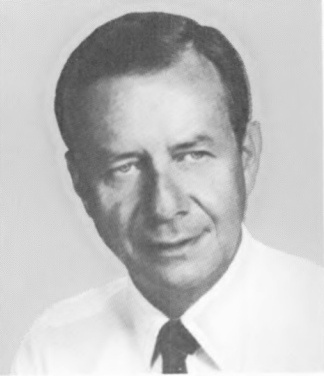

Member of the U.S. House of Representatives from New Jersey's 14th district
- In office January 3, 1979 – January 3, 1993
- Preceded by: Joseph A. LeFante
- Succeeded by: seat abolished

Member of the New Jersey Senate from the 12th district
- In office January 11, 1966 – January 11, 1972
- Preceded by: Constituency established
- Succeeded by: Multi-member district

Personal details
- Born: Frank Joseph Guarini; August 20, 1924 Jersey City, New Jersey, U.S.
- Died: June 20, 2026 (aged 101) Jersey City, New Jersey, U.S.
- Resting place: Holy Cross Chapel Mausoleum
- Party: Democratic
- Spouse: Audrey Berman (m. 1954, divorced)
- Education: Dartmouth College (BA); New York University (JD, LLM); Hague Academy of International Law (attended)

Military service
- Branch: United States Navy
- Service years: 1944–1946
- Rank: Lieutenant
- Unit: USS Mount McKinley
- Conflict: World War II

Frank Joseph Guarini Jr. (August 20, 1924 – June 20, 2026) was an American politician from the U.S. state of New Jersey who served as a member of the New Jersey Senate from 1966 to 1972 and as a member of the United States House of Representatives for seven terms from 1979 to 1993.

== Early life and education ==
Guarini was born on August 20, 1924, in Jersey City, New Jersey, to Frank Joseph Guarini Sr. and the former Caroline Critelli. He was of Italian descent. He graduated from Lincoln High School in 1942. He served in the United States Navy aboard USS Mount McKinley from 1944 to 1946. Guarini received a Bachelor of Arts degree from Dartmouth College, in 1947 and a Juris Doctor degree from New York University School of Law in 1950 as well as a Master of Laws degree in 1955. He pursued graduate work at The Hague Academy of International Law and was admitted to the New Jersey bar in 1951. He began practice in Jersey City.

== Political career ==
Guarini served in the New Jersey Senate from 1965 to 1972. In 1970, Guarini unsuccessfully challenged incumbent U.S. Senator Harrison A. Williams in the Democratic primary, losing 66%–34%.

=== Congress ===
Guarini was elected as a Democrat for New Jersey's 14th congressional district to the 96th United States Congress and was reelected six times. He retired from Congress in 1993. His district number was eliminated following the 1990 United States Census, but in a sense was succeeded by Bob Menendez in the renumbered 13th district.

== Personal life ==
In 1954, Guarini married Audrey Berman. The couple later divorced.

In retirement, Guarini lived in New York City for some time before returning to Jersey City. On August 20, 2024, he turned 100. On June 20, 2026, he died in Jersey City at the age of 101. He was interred with his parents in the chapel mausoleum of Holy Cross Cemetery in North Arlington, New Jersey on June 29, 2026.

== Legacy ==
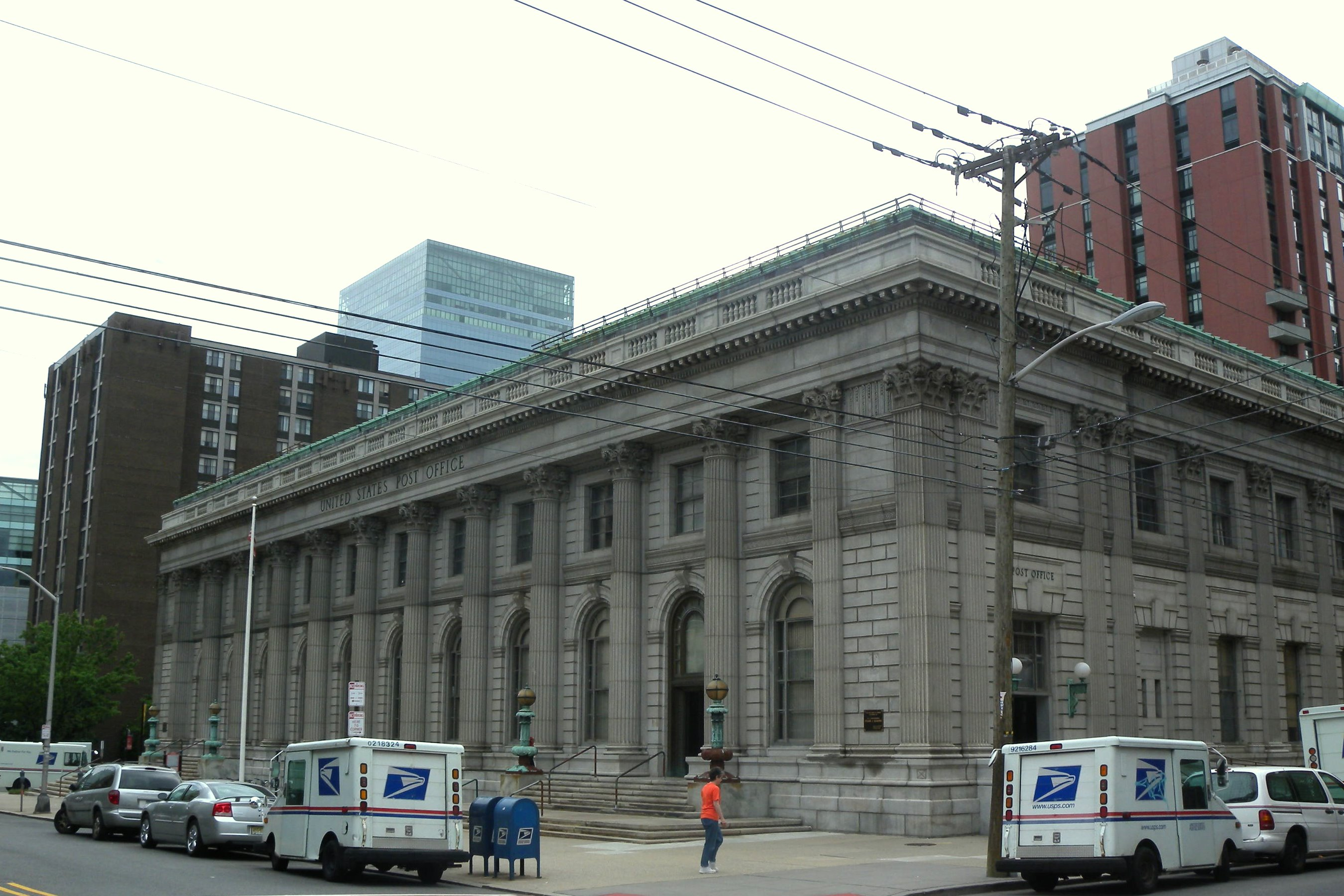
Jersey City Post Office

The Jersey City post office building on the corner of Montgomery and Washington is now dedicated to Guarini. John Cabot University in Rome, Italy, designated its campus as the Frank J. Guarini campus, and the library at New Jersey City University is also named in his honor.

Guarini received the America Award of the Italy–USA Foundation in 2014.

Dartmouth has created the Frank J. Guarini Institute for International Education in recognition of his longtime support of the college. In 2018, Dartmouth further recognized him by announcing the naming of the Guarini School of Graduate and Advanced Studies in his honor.

Guarini's second alma mater New York University School of Law named two of its centers/institutes after him. The Guarini Center on Environmental, Energy and Land Use Law focuses on land and environmental policy. The Guarini Institute for Global Legal Studies focuses on transnational law. Guarini became the oldest living former U.S. Representative following the death of Al Quie in August 2023.

U.S. House of Representatives
Preceded by Joseph A. LeFante	Member of the U.S. House of Representatives from New Jersey's 14th congressional district 1979–1993	Succeeded by seat abolished
Honorary titles
Preceded by Al Quie	Oldest living United States Representative; Sitting or Former; 2023–2026	Succeeded by G. William Whitehurst
