= John J. Eagan (politician) =

American politician

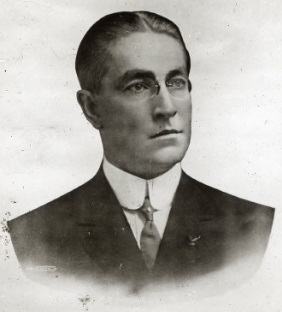

Member of the U.S. House of Representatives from New Jersey's 11th district
- In office March 4, 1923 – March 3, 1925
- Preceded by: Archibald E. Olpp
- Succeeded by: Oscar L. Auf der Heide
- In office March 4, 1913 – March 3, 1921
- Preceded by: District created
- Succeeded by: Archibald E. Olpp

Personal details
- Born: January 22, 1872 Hoboken, New Jersey, US
- Died: June 13, 1956 (aged 84) Paramus, New Jersey, US
- Party: Democratic

John Joseph Eagan (January 22, 1872 – June 13, 1956) was an American Democratic Party politician who represented New Jersey's 11th congressional district in the United States House of Representatives from 1913 to 1921.

== Biography ==
Born in Hoboken, New Jersey to Irish immigrant parents, he graduated from public, parochial, and private schools. In 1894, he founded and was president of the Eagan Schools of Business in Hoboken, Union Hill, and Hackensack, New Jersey and Brooklyn. He was the first vice president of the Merchants & Manufacturers' Trust Co. and collector of taxes of Union Township, Union County, New Jersey 1896–1899.

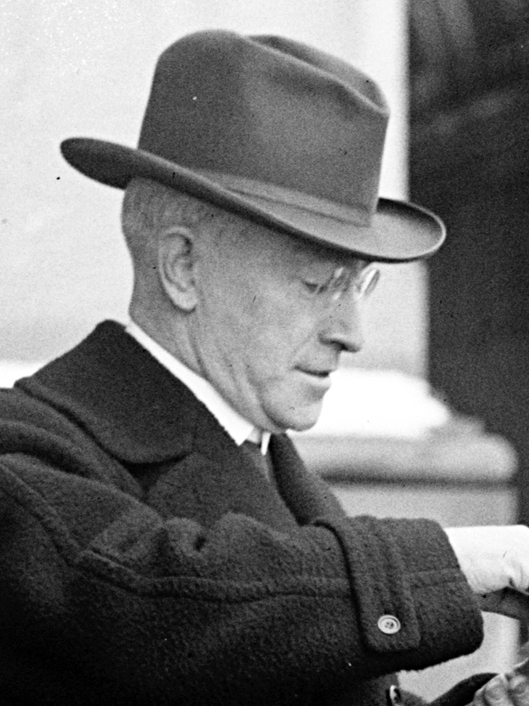
Eagan in February 1920

Eagan was elected as a Democrat to the Sixty-third and to the three succeeding Congresses (March 4, 1913 – March 3, 1921). He was a delegate to the 1920 Democratic National Convention at San Francisco, California. He was an unsuccessful candidate for reelection in 1920 to the Sixty-seventh Congress. He was again elected to the Sixty-eighth Congress (March 4, 1923 – March 3, 1925) but was an unsuccessful candidate for renomination in 1924.

After Congress, Eagan resumed his former business pursuits. He served as a member and president of the Board of Education, Weehawken, New Jersey 1932-1940 and was appointed collector of taxes and custodian of school moneys of Weehawken in 1940 and collector of taxes 1941–1955. He resided in Weehawken until his death in Paramus, New Jersey in 1956 and was buried Tillson, New York.

U.S. House of Representatives
Preceded by New Seat	Member of the U.S. House of Representatives from New Jersey's 11th congressional district March 4, 1913 – March 3, 1921	Succeeded by Archibald E. Olpp
Preceded by Archibald E. Olpp	Member of the U.S. House of Representatives from New Jersey's 11th congressional district March 4, 1923 – March 3, 1925	Succeeded by Oscar L. Auf der Heide
