= Edward J. Hart =

American politician (1893–1961)

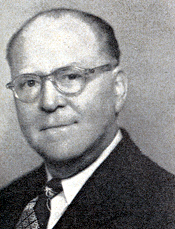

Member of the U.S. House of Representatives from New Jersey's 14th district
- In office January 3, 1935 – January 3, 1955
- Preceded by: Oscar L. Auf der Heide
- Succeeded by: T. James Tumulty

Personal details
- Born: Edward Joseph Hart; March 25, 1893 Jersey City, New Jersey, U.S.
- Died: April 20, 1961 (aged 68) Ocean Township, Monmouth County, New Jersey, U.S.
- Resting place: St. Catharine's Cemetery, in Sea Girt, New Jersey
- Party: Democratic
- Spouse: Loretta O'Connell (m. 1936)
- Education: St. Peter's College; Georgetown University

Edward Joseph Hart (March 25, 1893 – April 20, 1961) was an American Democratic Party politician who represented New Jersey's 14th congressional district in the United States House of Representatives from 1935 to 1955.

== Early years and education ==
Hart was born in Jersey City, New Jersey on March 25, 1893. He attended St. Peter's Preparatory School and later graduated from St. Peter's College in 1913. In 1924, he graduated from the law department of Georgetown University.

== Career ==
Hart was secretary to the Excise Commission, Washington, D.C. from 1913 to 1917, and chief field deputy, Internal Revenue Bureau from 1916 to 1921. He was admitted to the District of Columbia bar in 1924 and to the New Jersey bar in 1925. He practiced law in Jersey City since 1927 and was assistant corporation counsel of Jersey City from 1930 to 1934.

He was chairman of the New Jersey Democratic State Committee from 1944 until 1953.

=== Congress ===
He was elected as a Democrat to the Seventy-fourth and to the nine succeeding Congresses, serving in Congress from January 3, 1935 – January 3, 1955. In Congress he was chairman of the Committee on War Claims (Seventy-eighth Congress), House Committee on Un-American Activities (Seventy-ninth Congress) and the House Committee on Merchant Marine and Fisheries (Eighty-first and Eighty-second Congresses). He was not a candidate for renomination in 1954.

=== Later years ===
After leaving Congress, Hart was a member of State Board of Public Utility Commissioners from 1955 to 1960.

== Personal life and death ==
Hart married Loretta O'Connell in 1936; the couple had no children. He died in the West Allenhurst section of Ocean Township, Monmouth County, New Jersey on April 20, 1961, and was interred in St. Catharine's Cemetery, in Sea Girt, New Jersey.

== See also ==
- List of members of the House Un-American Activities Committee

U.S. House of Representatives
Preceded by Oscar L. Auf der Heide	Member of the U.S. House of Representatives from New Jersey's 14th congressional district January 3, 1935 – January 3, 1955	Succeeded by T. James Tumulty
Party political offices
Preceded by Mary T. Norton	Chairman of the New Jersey Democratic State Committee; 1944–1953	Succeeded by Charles R. Howell
