= Jack Stephans =

American football player and coach (1939–2020)

Biographical details
- Born: March 1, 1939; Hoboken, New Jersey, U.S.
- Died: September 29, 2020 (aged 81); Montvale, New Jersey, U.S.
- Education: University of South Carolina; Boston University (1962)

Playing career
- 1959–1960: Boston University
- Position: Center

Coaching career (HC unless noted)
- 1963: North Bergen HS (NJ) (line)
- 1964–1965: Montclair State (assistant)
- 1966–1973: Jersey City State
- 1974: William Paterson (assistant)
- 1975–1977: William Paterson
- 1978: William Paterson (assistant)
- 1979–1980: Fordham

Head coaching record
- Overall: 58–49–1

Accomplishments and honors

Championships
- 2 NJSAC (1966, 1972)

Jack J. Stephans (March 1, 1939 – September 29, 2020) was American football coach. He served as the head football coach at Jersey City State College—now known as New Jersey City University—from 1966 to 1973, at William Paterson University in Wayne, New Jersey, from 1975 to 1977, and at Fordham University from 1979 to 1980.

Born in Hoboken, Stephans was raised in nearby West New York and played prep football at Memorial High School in his hometown, graduating in 1957.

Stephans died on September 29, 2020, from complications of amyotrophic lateral sclerosis (ALS).

== Head coaching record ==
Year	Team	Overall	Conference	Standing	Bowl/playoffs
Jersey City State Gothic Knights (New Jersey State Athletic Conference) (1966–1973)
1966	Jersey City State	6–0		T–1st	
1967	Jersey City State				
1968	Jersey City State				
1969	Jersey City State	5–3	1–2	3rd	
1970	Jersey City State	5–3	1–2	3rd	
1971	Jersey City State	7–2	1–2	T–2nd	
1972	Jersey City State	8–1	4–1	T–1st	
1973	Jersey City State	9–1	4–1	2nd	
Jersey City State:		48–15			
William Paterson Pioneers (New Jersey State Athletic Conference) (1975–1977)
1975	William Paterson	1–8	0–5	6th	
1976	William Paterson	5–4	2–3	5th	
1977	William Paterson	4–4–1	0–3–1	5th	
William Paterson:		10–16–1	2–11–1		
Fordham Rams (NCAA Division III independent) (1979–1980)
1979	Fordham	0–9			
1980	Fordham	0–9			
Fordham:		0–18			
Total:		58–49–1			
