= Mike Stephans =

American football player

Mike Stephans was an American football player for the Rutgers University Scarlet Knights. He was the team's starting quarterback in 1996.

== College ==
Stephans was from Morristown, New Jersey. He played both baseball and football. As a football player, he was a quarterback and played 3rd baseman on the baseball diamond.

He started the season as the third-string quarterback behind Corey Valentine and Ralph Sacca. During the first Rutgers game, a win over Villanova, Stephans played in the second half and completed two of four passes for 29 yards. He also had one rushing touchdown. The following week against Navy, he again received some playing time in the second half; he was 2 for 6 passing for 29 yards, and the Scarlet Knights lost.

Before the third game against #10 ranked Miami, Rutgers coach Terry Shea announced that Stephans would be the starter. "Mike has a strong arm and is just what the team needs to have," said Shea. "He's probably the most gifted of our three passers, but he's had no chance." It was Stephans' first collegiate start, and he completed 12 of 20 passes with two interceptions in a 33–0 loss.

Stephans continued to see action during the next few games. On October 12, he was 16 for 24 passing with 246 yards and two touchdowns in a loss to Army. However, in a game against Boston College, Stephans broke his left thumb and missed some time the rest of the year because of that.

Overall, Stephans finished the 1996 season with 1981 passing yards and 8 touchdowns. He led the Scarlet Knights in both passing yards and total offense. In all, Stephans played three seasons with the Scarlet Knights after transferring from the University of Tennessee.
