= New Jersey's 14th congressional district =

Former U.S. House district in New Jersey

- Obsolete district
- Created: 1930
- Eliminated: 1990
- Years active: 1933–1993

New Jersey's 14th congressional district in the House of Representatives was eliminated after the 1990 census. As a result of the congressional apportionment performed after this census, New Jersey lost one seat and was reduced to thirteen seats in the House of Representatives.

New Jersey had gained a fourteenth seat following the 1930 census, and had as many as fifteen seats following the 1960 and 1970 censuses. After 1980, New Jersey was back down to fourteen seats.

In the 1980s, the district covered an area surrounding Jersey City, and was represented for seven terms by Frank Guarini. With the new lines drawn after the 1990 census, this seat was effectively renumbered as the 13th district.

== History and representation ==
The 14th congressional district (together with the 13th district) was created starting with the 73rd United States Congress in 1933, based on redistricting following the 1930 United States census.

== List of members representing the district ==
Member	Party	Years	Cong ress	Electoral history
District established March 4, 1933
Oscar L. Auf der Heide (West New York)	Democratic	March 4, 1933 – January 3, 1935	73rd	Redistricted from the 11th district and re-elected in 1932. Retired.
Edward J. Hart (Jersey City)	Democratic	January 3, 1935 – January 3, 1955	74th 75th 76th 77th 78th 79th 80th 81st 82nd 83rd	Elected in 1934. Re-elected in 1936. Re-elected in 1938. Re-elected in 1940. Re-elected in 1942. Re-elected in 1944. Re-elected in 1946. Re-elected in 1948. Re-elected in 1950. Re-elected in 1952. Retired.
T. James Tumulty (Jersey City)	Democratic	January 3, 1955 – January 3, 1957	84th	Elected in 1954. Lost re-election.
Vincent J. Dellay (West New York)	Republican	January 3, 1957 – January 3, 1959	85th	Elected in 1956. Lost renomination.
Vincent J. Dellay (West New York)	Democratic (Note: Dellay changed his party affiliation from Republican to Democratic sometime in 1958.)	January 3, 1957 – January 3, 1959	85th	Elected in 1956. Lost renomination.
Dominick V. Daniels (Union City)	Democratic	January 3, 1959 – January 3, 1977	86th 87th 88th 89th 90th 91st 92nd 93rd 94th	Elected in 1958. Re-elected in 1960. Re-elected in 1962. Re-elected in 1964. Re-elected in 1966. Re-elected in 1968. Re-elected in 1970. Re-elected in 1972. Re-elected in 1974. Retired.
Joseph A. LeFante (Bayonne)	Democratic	January 3, 1977 – December 14, 1978	95th	Elected in 1976. Retired and resigned early.
Vacant		December 14, 1978 – January 3, 1979	95th	
Frank J. Guarini (Jersey City)	Democratic	January 3, 1979 – January 3, 1993	96th 97th 98th 99th 100th 101st 102nd	Elected in 1978. Re-elected in 1980. Re-elected in 1982. Re-elected in 1984. Re-elected in 1986. Re-elected in 1988. Re-elected in 1990. Redistricted to the 13th district and retired.
District dissolved January 3, 1993
