= West New York School District =

School district in Hudson County, New Jersey, US

Address
- 6028 Broadway West New York, Hudson County, New Jersey, 07093; United States
- Coordinates: 40.786745°N 74.010535°W

District information
- Grades: PreK-12
- Superintendent: Clara Brito Herrera
- Business administrator: Dean Austin
- Schools: 9
- Affiliation: Former Abbott district

Students and staff
- Enrollment: 8,498 (as of 2018–19)
- Faculty: 595.0 FTEs
- Student–teacher ratio: 14.3:1

Other information
- District Factor Group: A
- Website: www.wnyschools.net
Ind.	Per pupil	District spending	Rank (*)	K-12 average	%± vs. average
1A	Total Spending	$17,620	40	$18,891	−6.7%
1	Budgetary Cost	15,724	73	14,783	6.4%
2	Classroom Instruction	9,410	78	8,763	7.4%
6	Support Services	2,938	86	2,392	22.8%
8	Administrative Cost	1,350	32	1,485	−9.1%
10	Operations & Maintenance	1,622	53	1,783	−9.0%
13	Extracurricular Activities	141	12	268	−47.4%
16	Median Teacher Salary	65,667	57	64,043
Data from NJDoE 2014 Taxpayers' Guide to Education Spending. *Of K-12 districts with more than 3,500 students. Lowest spending=1; Highest=103

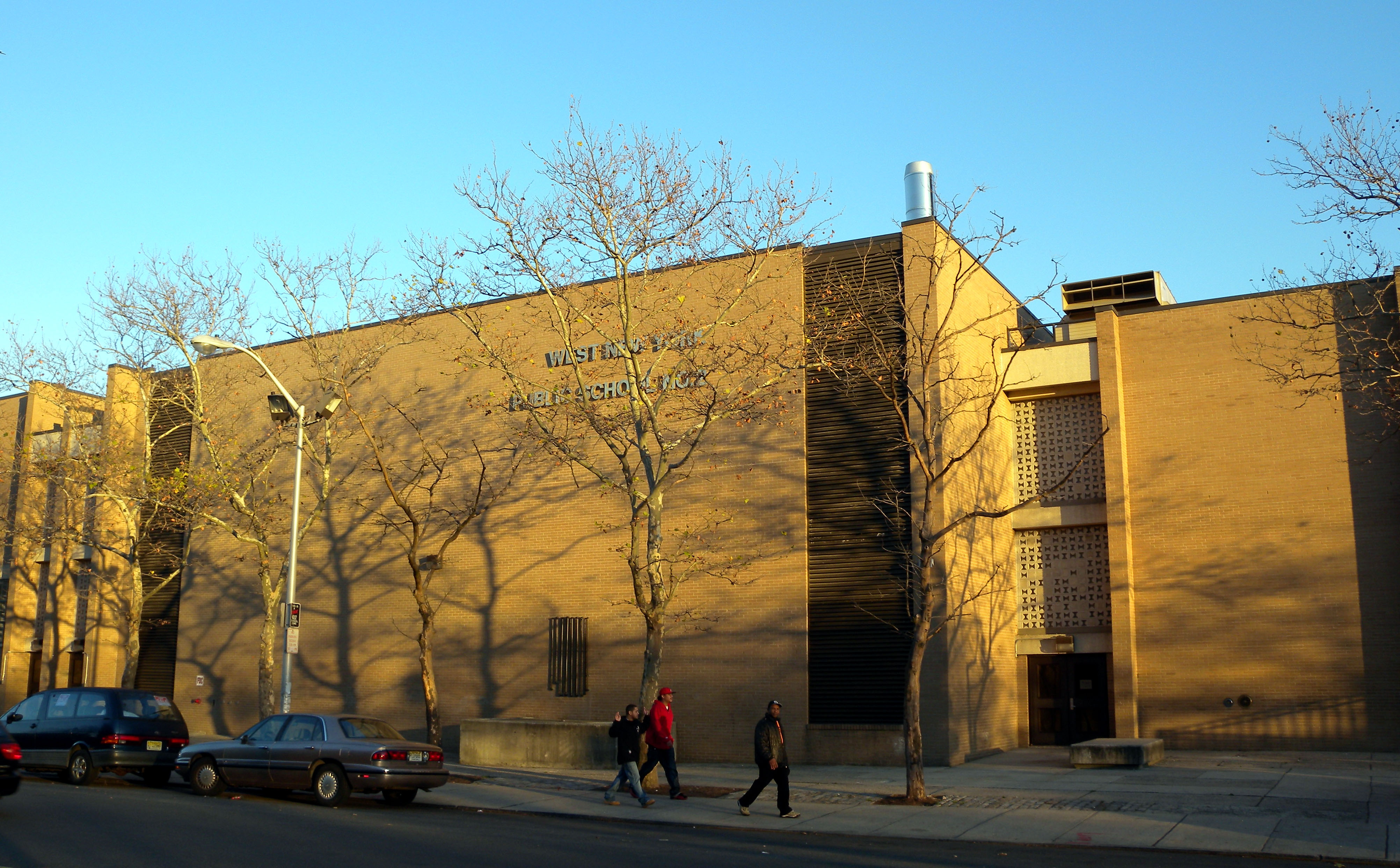
School #2

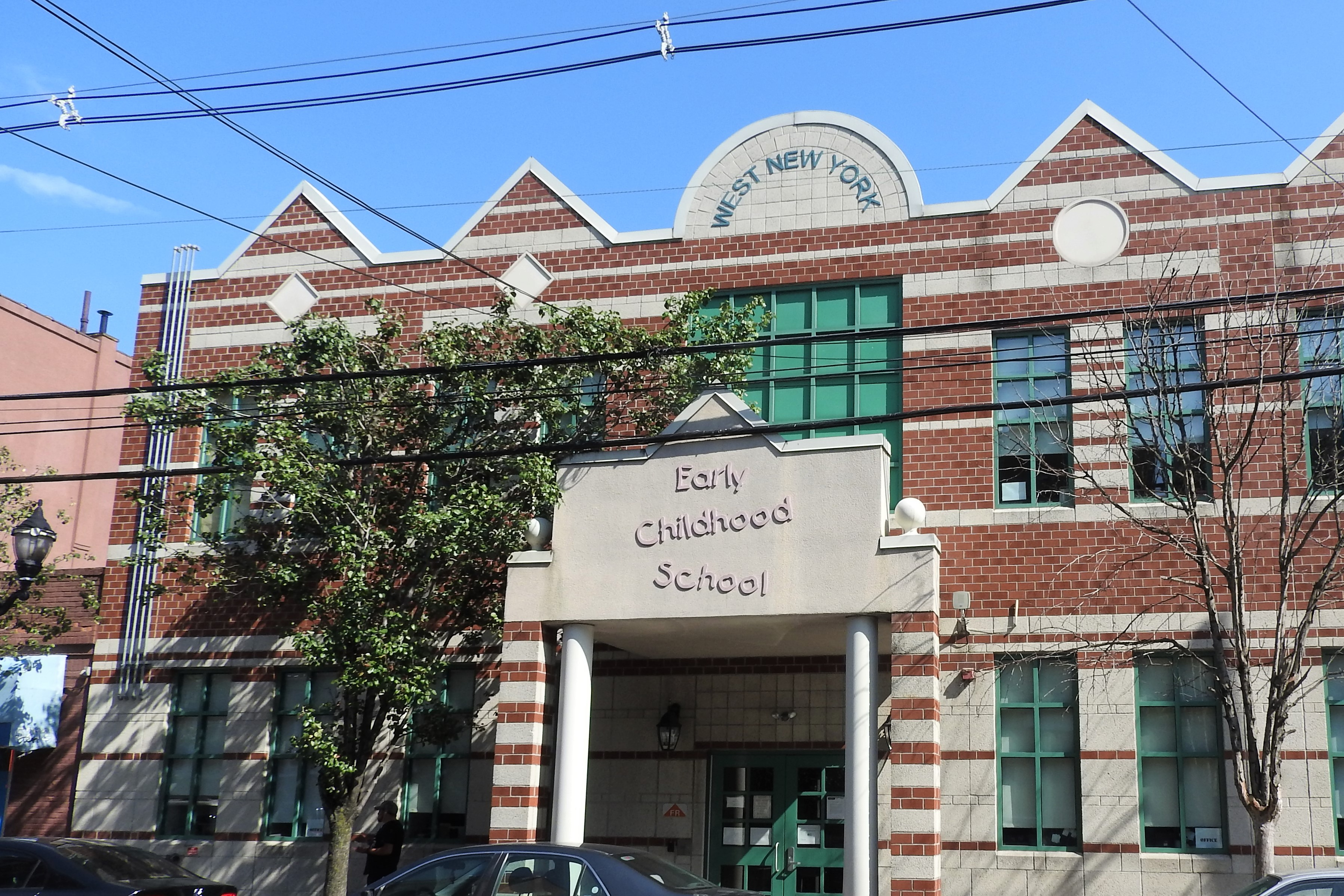
Early Childhood School

West New York School District is a public school district serving students in pre-kindergarten through twelfth grade in West New York, in Hudson County, in the U.S. state of New Jersey. The district is one of 31 former Abbott districts statewide that were established pursuant to the decision by the New Jersey Supreme Court in Abbott v. Burke which are now referred to as "SDA Districts" based on the requirement for the state to cover all costs for school building and renovation projects in these districts under the supervision of the New Jersey Schools Development Authority. As of the 2018–19 school year, the district, comprising nine schools, had an enrollment of 8,498 students and 595.0 classroom teachers (on an FTE basis), for a student–teacher ratio of 14.3:1.

The district is classified by the New Jersey Department of Education as being in District Factor Group "A", the lowest of eight groupings. District Factor Groups organize districts statewide to allow comparison by common socioeconomic characteristics of the local districts. From lowest socioeconomic status to highest, the categories are A, B, CD, DE, FG, GH, I and J.

== Schools ==
Schools in the district (with 2018–19 enrollment data from the National Center for Education Statistics) are:

- Early Childhood School with 499 students in PreK

Elementary schools

- Public School #1 with 834 students in grades K-6
- Public School #2 with 736 students in grades K-6
- Public School #3 with 599 students in grades K-6
- Albio Sires Elementary School (School #4) with 685 students in grades K-6
- Public School #5 with 692 students in grades K-6
- Harry L. Bain Elementary School (School #6) with 661 students in grades K-6

Middle school

- West New York Middle School with 1,056 students in grades 7–8

High school

- Memorial High School with 2,034 students in grades 9–12

== Administration ==
Core members of the district's administration are:

- Clara Brito Herrera, superintendent
- Dean Austin, business administrator and board secretary

== Board of education ==
The district's board of education, comprised of nine members, sets policy and oversees the fiscal and educational operation of the district through its administration. As a Type II school district, the board's trustees are elected directly by voters to serve three-year terms of office on a staggered basis, with three seats up for election each year held in April. The board appoints a superintendent to oversee the district's day-to-day operations and a business administrator to supervise the business functions of the district.

Of the nearly 600 school districts statewide, West New York is one of 12 districts with school elections in April, in which voters also decide on passage of the annual school budget. Under a state law passed in 2012, West New York shifted elections from April to November in 2014 but voted in 2019 to shift elections back to April.
