= Taxation in New Jersey =

Overview of taxation in the U.S. state of New Jersey

The U.S. state of New Jersey levies a state personal income tax and state corporate income tax and a state sales tax. Property taxes are also levied by municipalities, counties, and school districts.

== History ==
From the founding of the New Jersey colony to the 1870s, the main form of taxation was property taxes.

== Personal income tax ==
The tax table below will show in detail the New Jersey state income tax rates by income tax bracket(s). There are 6 income tax brackets for New Jersey.

Tax brackets for individuals are provided below:

- For earnings between $1 and $20,000, the tax rate on every dollar of income earned is 1.4%.
- For earnings between $20,001 and $35,000, the tax rate on every dollar of income earned is 1.75%.
- For earnings between $35,001 and $40,000, the tax rate on every dollar of income earned is 3.5%.
- For earnings between $40,001 and $75,000, the tax rate on every dollar of income earned is 5.525%.
- For earnings between $75,001 and $500,000, the tax rate on every dollar of income earned is 6.37%.
- For earnings of $500,001 and over, the tax rate on every dollar of income earned is 8.97%.

To give an example, if you filed individually and your earned income was $50,000 your tax would be calculated the following way: ($20,000 (first bracket) x 1.4%) + ($15,000 (second bracket) x 1.75%) + ($5,000 (third bracket) x 3.5%) + ($10,000 (fourth bracket) x 5.525%) = $280 + $262.50 + $175 + $552.50 = $1,270, for an overall rate of 2.54%.

Beginning in 2019, the top marginal rate will be raised to 10.75% for incomes over $5 million, making it the second highest top marginal tax rate in the nation (after California's top rate of 13.3%).

== Sales tax ==
New Jersey has a 6.625% state sales tax, which was cut in steps from the previous rate of 7%. All revenues are deposited in the State Treasury for general state use; nothing goes to municipalities.

In urban enterprise zones, the state sales tax is cut in half to encourage economic development, resulting in an effective tax rate of 3.3125%. A full list of urban enterprise zones is available on the State of New Jersey website.

New Jersey does not charge sales tax on most unprepared foods, household paper products, medicine, and clothing. As of July 1, 2022 New Jersey Does not charge sales tax on medical cannabis. New Jersey does not charge sales tax on gasoline, but gasoline is subject to a $0.418/gallon excise tax.

Cigarettes are subject to a $2.70 per pack excise tax in addition to sales tax.

== Corporate income tax ==
New Jersey's current corporate income is 9% for corporation with income greater than $100,000. Companies with income up to $100,000, but greater than $50,000 pay a rate of 7.5% and companies with incomes of $50,000 or less pay a rate of 6.5%. Under a budget deal reached on June 30, 2018, New Jersey's the rate will rise to 11.5% for companies with income over $1 million for the next two years. In the third year it would be decreased to 10.5% before being returned to 9% in the fifth year. New Jersey's top rate of 11.5% will be the second highest in the nation (after Iowa's top rate of 12%).

== See also ==
- Law of New Jersey
