= T. James Tumulty =

American politician (1913–1981)

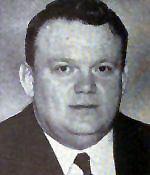

Member of the U.S. House of Representatives from New Jersey's 14th district
- In office January 3, 1955 – January 3, 1957
- Preceded by: Edward J. Hart
- Succeeded by: Vincent J. Dellay

Personal details
- Born: Thomas James Tumulty; March 2, 1913 Jersey City, New Jersey, U.S.
- Died: November 23, 1981 (aged 68) Jersey City, New Jersey, U.S.
- Resting place: Holy Name Cemetery
- Party: Democratic
- Education: College of the Holy Cross; Fordham University; Seton Hall University

Thomas James Tumulty (March 2, 1913 – November 23, 1981) was an American lawyer, World War II veteran and Democratic Party politician who represented New Jersey's 14th congressional district in the United States House of Representatives for one term from 1955 to 1957.

== Early life and education ==
Tumulty was born in Jersey City, New Jersey, on March 2, 1913; all four of his grandparents were Irish immigrants.

He graduated from Xavier High School and attended the College of the Holy Cross, graduated from Fordham University in 1935, from Seton Hall University in 1938 and from John Marshall Law School in Jersey City in 1938.

Tumulty was admitted to the bar in 1940 and commenced the practice of law in Jersey City. He was a professor at Seton Hall in 1940 and 1941 and taught at St. Aloysius High School in Jersey City in 1949 and 1950.

== Military and political career ==
=== World War II ===
He served in the United States Army as an enlisted man in 1943 and 1944.

=== State Assembly ===
Tumulty served in the New Jersey General Assembly from 1944 to 1952, serving as minority leader in 1951. He was assistant corporation counsel for Jersey City from 1943 to 1954, was a delegate to the 1952 Democratic National Convention, and was secretary to the mayor of Jersey City in 1952 and 1953. Famous as a storyteller and also for his 300-pound frame, Tumulty described his time in the army as "I went in as a private and came out as a platoon."

=== Congress ===
Tumulty was elected as a Democrat to the Eighty-fourth Congress, serving in office from January 3, 1955 – January 3, 1957, and was an unsuccessful candidate for reelection to the Eighty-fifth Congress.

== Later career ==
After leaving Congress, he was special counsel Urban Renewal for Jersey City in 1957, deputy mayor of Jersey City 1958-1960 and resumed the practice of law. He was a judge of the Superior Court of New Jersey from 1967 to 1972.

== Death and burial ==
Tumulty was a resident of Jersey City until his death there on November 23, 1981. he was interred at Holy Name Cemetery in Jersey City.

U.S. House of Representatives
Preceded by Edward J. Hart	Member of the U.S. House of Representatives from New Jersey's 14th congressional district January 3, 1955 – January 3, 1957	Succeeded by Vincent J. Dellay
