= Dominick V. Daniels =

American politician (1908–1987)

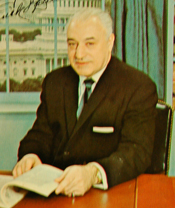

Member of the U.S. House of Representatives from New Jersey's 14th district
- In office January 3, 1959 – January 3, 1977
- Preceded by: Vincent J. Dellay
- Succeeded by: Joseph A. LeFante

Personal details
- Born: Dominick Vincent Daniels; October 18, 1908 Jersey City, New Jersey, U.S.
- Died: July 17, 1987 (aged 78) Union City, New Jersey, U.S.
- Resting place: Holy Cross Cemetery
- Party: Democratic
- Education: Fordham University; Rutgers School of Law – Newark

Dominick Vincent Daniels (October 18, 1908 – July 17, 1987) was an American Democratic Party politician who represented New Jersey's 14th congressional district for nine terms from 1959 to 1977.

== Early life and education ==
He was born in Jersey City, New Jersey on October 18, 1908. Daniels was educated in the Jersey City Public Schools, graduating from William L. Dickinson High School in 1925.

He attended Fordham University, New York City. He graduated from Rutgers University Law School in Newark, New Jersey, in 1929. He was admitted to the bar in New Jersey in 1930 and commenced the practice of law in Jersey City, New Jersey.

== Political career ==
He was appointed magistrate of the Jersey City Municipal Court in May 1952, reappointed in 1955, and subsequently was appointed presiding magistrate, in which capacity he served until March 1958. He served as delegate, Democratic National Conventions, 1960, 1964 and 1968.

Daniels was elected as a Democrat to the Eighty-sixth and to the eight succeeding Congresses (January 3, 1959 – January 3, 1977). He was not a candidate for reelection in 1976 to the Ninety-fifth Congress.

== Later life ==
Daniels returned to the practice of law in Jersey City after leaving Congress.

=== Death and burial ===
He lived in Union City, New Jersey until his death in Jersey City on July 17, 1987. He was interred in Holy Cross Cemetery in North Arlington, New Jersey.

== Legacy ==
The USPS Processing and Distribution Center on Newark Turnpike in Kearny, New Jersey is named in his honor. His name is included in the postmark on envelopes processed there.

U.S. House of Representatives
Preceded by Vincent J. Dellay	Member of the U.S. House of Representatives from New Jersey's 14th congressional district January 3, 1959 – January 3, 1977	Succeeded by Joseph A. LeFante
