= Joseph A. LeFante =

American politician

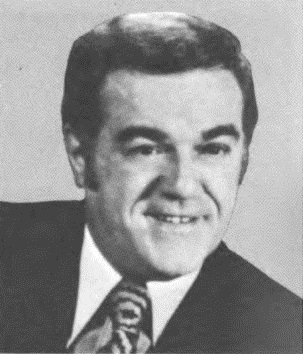

Commissioner of the New Jersey Department of Community Affairs
- In office December 15, 1978 – February 10, 1982
- Governor: Brendan Byrne
- Preceded by: Patricia Sheehan
- Succeeded by: John Renna

Member of the U.S. House of Representatives from New Jersey's 14th district
- In office January 3, 1977 – December 14, 1978
- Preceded by: Dominick V. Daniels
- Succeeded by: Frank Joseph Guarini

Member of the New Jersey General Assembly
- In office January 13, 1970 – January 3, 1977
- Preceded by: John J. Fekety; Addison McLeon
- Succeeded by: Stephen R. Kopycinski
- Constituency: District 12A (1970–1974); 31st District (1974–1977)

Personal details
- Born: September 8, 1928 Bayonne, New Jersey, U.S.
- Died: February 26, 1997 (aged 68) Manhattan, New York, U.S.
- Party: Democratic

Joseph Anthony Lefante (September 8, 1928 – February 26, 1997) was an American businessman and Democratic Party politician who represented New Jersey's 14th congressional district for one term from 1977 to 1978.

== Early life and education ==
Born in Bayonne, Lefante graduated from Bayonne High School. He completed courses at the Real Estate Institute of New Jersey in 1957. He served in the New Jersey National Guard from 1947 to 1952.

== Political career ==
He was a business owner and served as a member of the Bayonne city council from 1962 to 1970. He was also a member of the Bayonne Board of Education from 1964 to 1967.

He was elected to the New Jersey General Assembly and served from 1969 to 1976.

He served as a delegate to the New Jersey state Democratic convention, 1975. He served as a delegate to the Democratic National Convention, 1975.

=== Congress ===
Lefante was elected as a Democrat to the Ninety-fifth Congress, serving until his resignation on December 14, 1978.

=== After Congress ===
He was appointed Commissioner of Community Affairs by Governor Brendan Byrne, serving from 1978 to 1982.

He was an unsuccessful candidate for nomination to the United States Senate in 1982.

== Death ==
He died on February 26, 1997, in Manhattan, New York City. He was interred in Rose Hill Cemetery, Linden, New Jersey.

New Jersey General Assembly
Preceded by John J. Fekety	Member of the New Jersey General Assembly from the 12A district January 13, 1970–January 8, 1974	Succeeded by District abolished
Preceded by District created	Member of the New Jersey General Assembly from the 31st district January 8, 1974–January 3, 1977	Succeeded by Stephen R. Kopycinski
Political offices
Preceded by S. Howard Woodson	Speaker of the New Jersey General Assembly; 1976	Succeeded by William J. Hamilton
Preceded by Patricia Sheehan	Commissioner of the New Jersey Department of Community Affairs; December 15, 1978–February 10, 1982	Succeeded by John Renna
U.S. House of Representatives
Preceded by Dominick V. Daniels	Member of the U.S. House of Representatives from New Jersey's 14th congressional district January 3, 1977–December 14, 1978	Succeeded by Frank Joseph Guarini
