= List of municipalities in New Jersey =

Map of the United States with New Jersey highlighted

Interactive map of municipalities in New Jersey.

New Jersey is a state located in the Northeastern United States. According to the 2020 United States Census, New Jersey is the 11th most populous state with 9,288,994 inhabitants but the fifth smallest by land area, spanning 7,354.76 square miles (19,048.7 km^{2}). New Jersey is divided into 21 counties and contains 564 municipalities consisting of five types: 253 boroughs, 52 cities, 15 towns, 240 townships, and four villages. The largest municipality by population in New Jersey is Newark, with 311,549 residents, whereas the smallest is Walpack Township, with seven residents. New Jersey is the most populous U.S. state with no cities ranked in the top 50 most populous United States cities, with the next most populous being South Carolina.

As in most Northeastern states, all municipalities within New Jersey are incorporated.

== List of municipalities ==
Largest municipalities in New Jersey by population

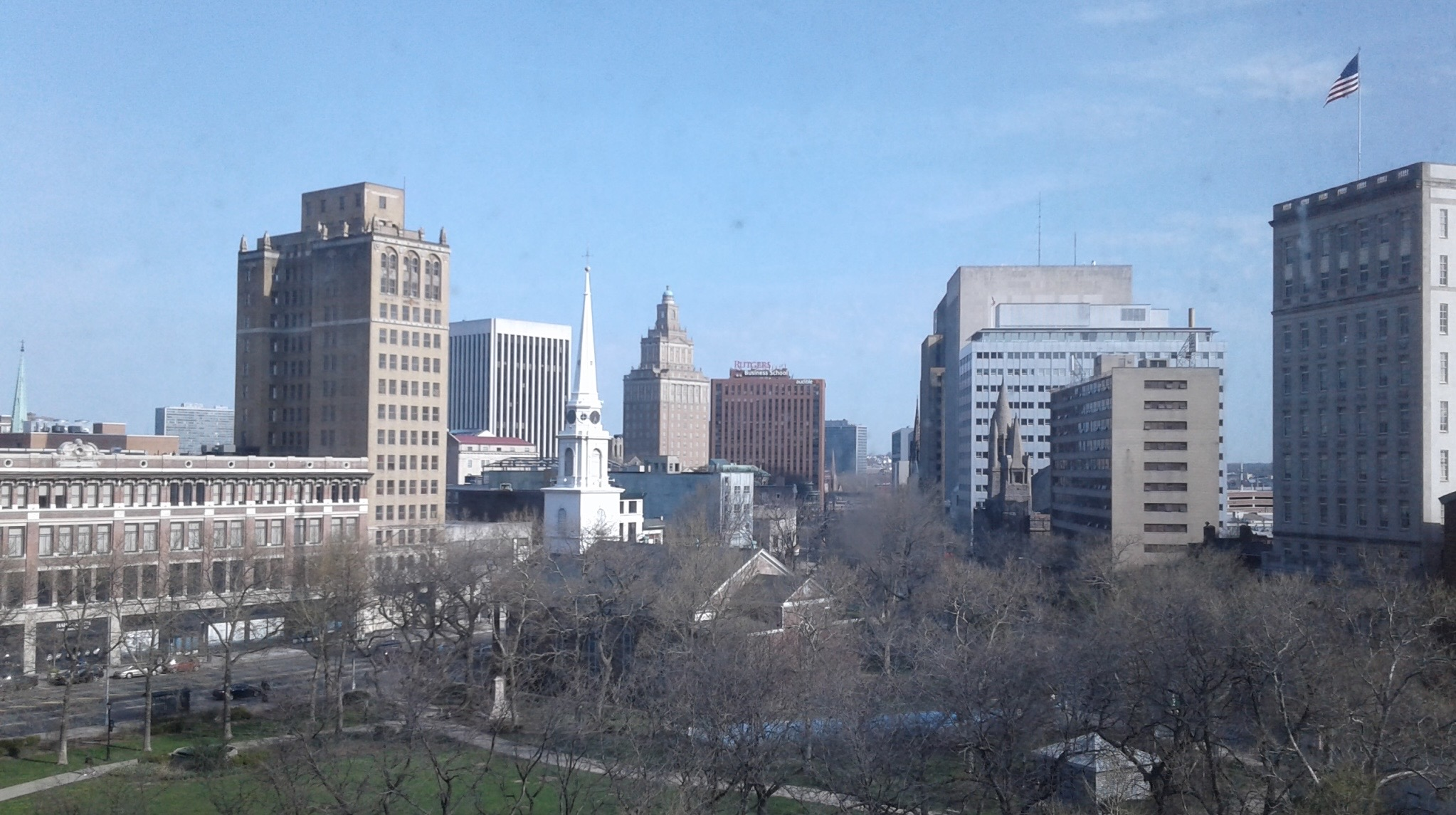
Newark, New Jersey's largest city by population

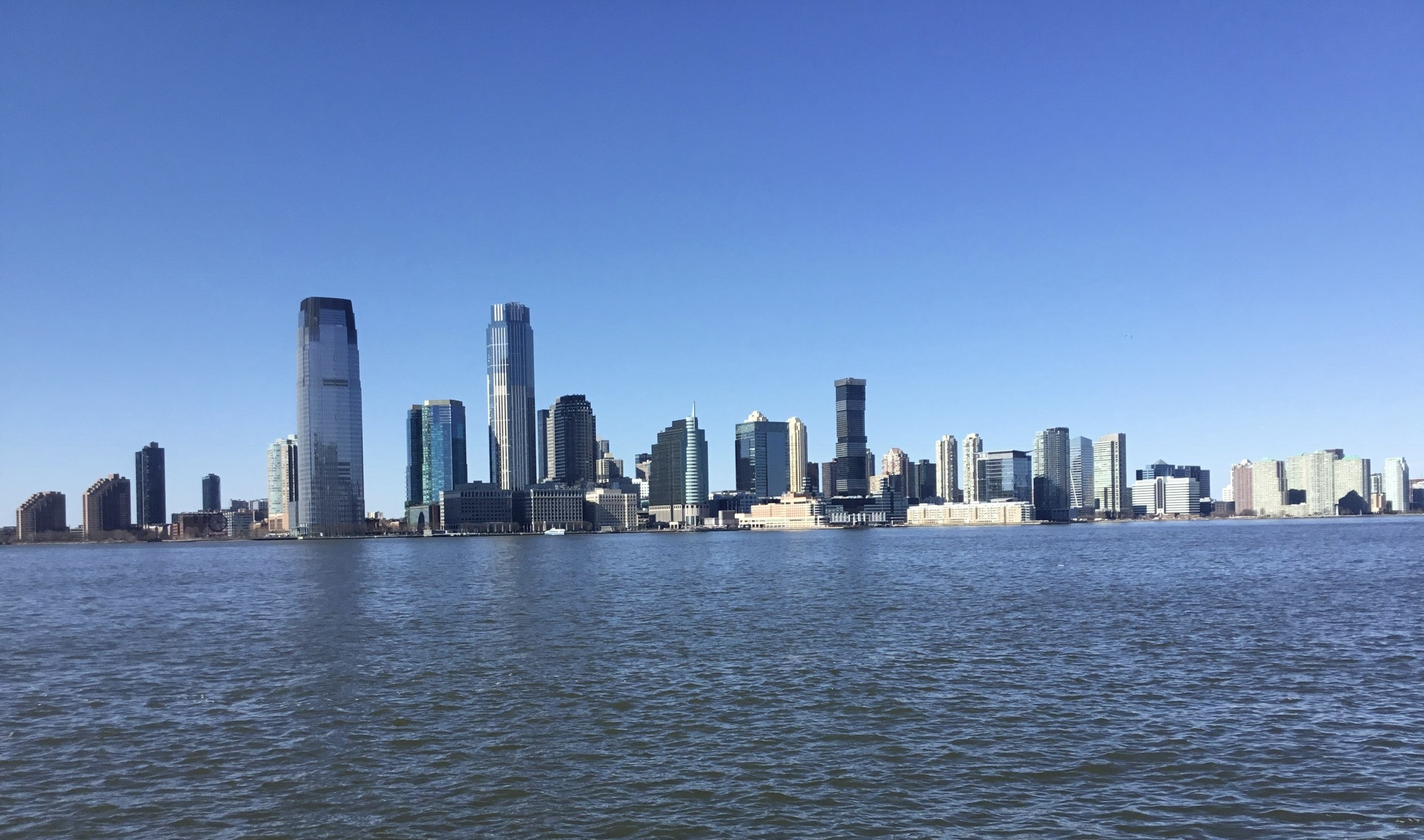
Jersey City, New Jersey's second-largest city by population

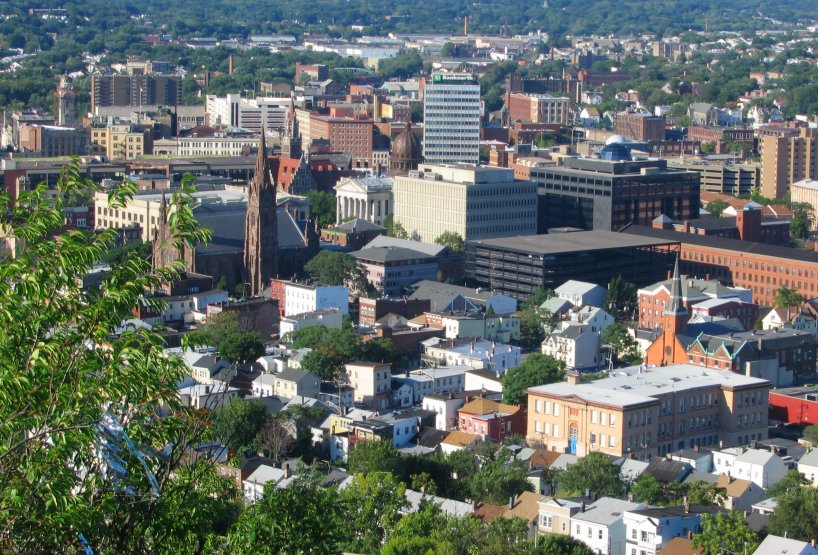
Paterson, New Jersey's third-largest city by population

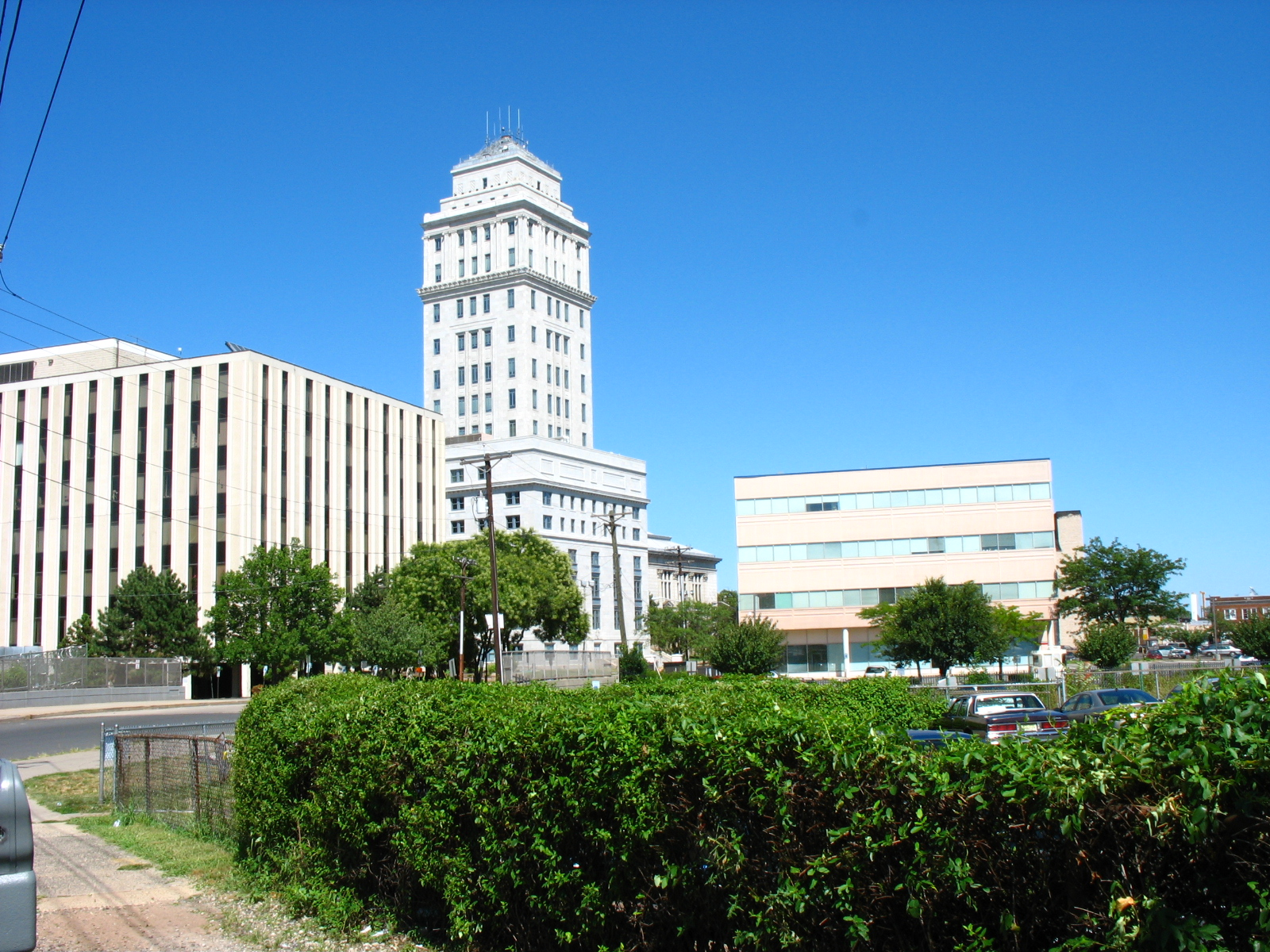
Elizabeth, New Jersey's fourth-largest city by population

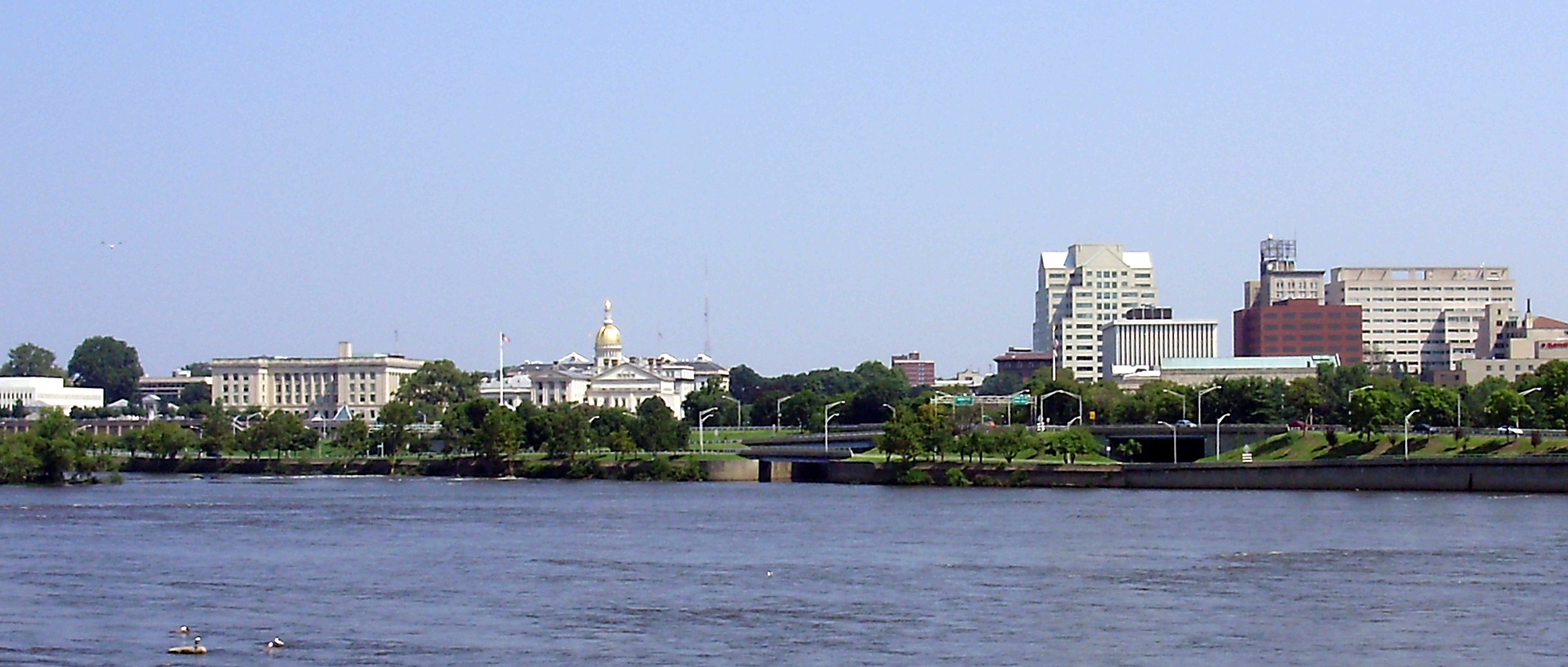
Trenton, the state capital of New Jersey

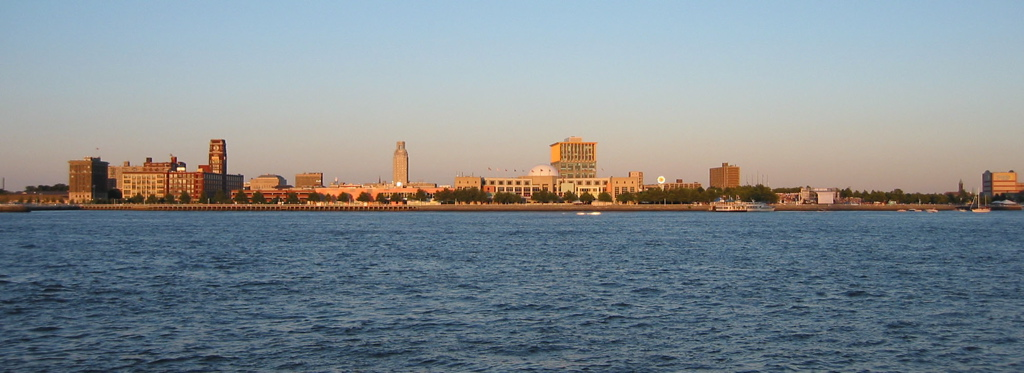
Camden, the largest city in South Jersey by population

Name	Type	County	Population (2020)	Population (2010)	Change	Land area		Population density	Form of government	Incorporated
Name	Type	County	Population (2020)	Population (2010)	Change	sq mi	km^{2}	Population density	Form of government	Incorporated
Newark	City	Essex	311,549	277,140	+12.4%	24.144	62.53	12,903.8/sq mi (4,982.2/km^{2})	Faulkner Act (mayor–council)	1666 (Note: As a Township. Reincorporated as a City in 1836.)
Jersey City	City	Hudson	292,449	247,597	+18.1%	14.744	38.19	19,835.1/sq mi (7,658.4/km^{2})	Faulkner Act (mayor–council)	1838
Paterson	City	Passaic	159,732	146,199	+9.3%	8.413	21.79	18,986.3/sq mi (7,330.7/km^{2})	Faulkner Act (mayor–council)	1831 (Note: As a Township. Reincorporated as a City in 1851.)
Elizabeth	City	Union	137,298	124,969	+9.9%	12.319	31.91	11,145.2/sq mi (4,303.2/km^{2})	Faulkner Act (mayor–council)	1855
Lakewood Township	Township	Ocean	135,158	92,843	+45.6%	24.681	63.92	5,476.2/sq mi (2,114.4/km^{2})	Township (New Jersey)	1892
Edison	Township	Middlesex	107,588	99,967	+7.6%	30.068	77.88	3,578.2/sq mi (1,381.5/km^{2})	Faulkner Act (mayor–council)	1870 (Note: As Raritan Township. Renamed Edison in 1954.)
Woodbridge Township	Township	Middlesex	103,639	99,585	+4.1%	23.258	60.24	4,456.1/sq mi (1,720.5/km^{2})	Faulkner Act (mayor–council)	1798
Toms River	Township	Ocean	95,438	91,239	+4.6%	40.541	105.00	2,354.1/sq mi (908.9/km^{2})	Faulkner Act (mayor–council)	1798 (Note: As Dover Township. Renamed Toms River in 2006.)
Hamilton Township	Township	Mercer	92,297	88,464	+4.3%	39.438	102.14	2,340.3/sq mi (903.6/km^{2})	Faulkner Act (mayor–council)	1842
Trenton	City	Mercer	90,871	84,913	+7.0%	7.579	19.63	11,989.8/sq mi (4,629.3/km^{2})	Faulkner Act (mayor–council)	1792
Clifton	City	Passaic	90,296	84,136	+7.3%	11.275	29.20	8,008.5/sq mi (3,092.1/km^{2})	1923 Municipal Manager Law	1917
Cherry Hill Township	Township	Camden	74,553	71,045	+4.9%	24.072	62.35	3,097.1/sq mi (1,195.8/km^{2})	Faulkner Act (mayor–council)	1844 (Note: As Delaware Township. Renamed Cherry Hill in 1961.)
Brick Township	Township	Ocean	73,620	75,072	−1.9%	25.587	66.27	2,877.2/sq mi (1,110.9/km^{2})	Faulkner Act (mayor–council)	1850
Camden	City	Camden	71,791	77,344	−7.2%	8.921	23.11	8,047.4/sq mi (3,107.1/km^{2})	Faulkner Act (mayor–council)	1828
Bayonne	City	Hudson	71,686	63,024	+13.7%	5.821	15.08	12,315.1/sq mi (4,754.9/km^{2})	Faulkner Act (mayor–council)	1861 (Note: As a Township. Reincorporated as a City in 1869.)
Passaic	City	Passaic	70,537	69,781	+1.1%	3.133	8.11	22,514.2/sq mi (8,692.8/km^{2})	Faulkner Act (mayor–council)	1873
East Orange	City	Essex	69,612	64,270	+8.3%	3.928	10.17	17,722.0/sq mi (6,842.5/km^{2})	City (New Jersey)	1863
Union City	City	Hudson	68,589	66,455	+3.2%	1.287	3.33	53,293.7/sq mi (20,576.8/km^{2})	Walsh Act	1925
Franklin Township	Township	Somerset	68,364	62,300	+9.7%	46.170	119.58	1,480.7/sq mi (571.7/km^{2})	Faulkner Act (council–manager)	1798
Middletown	Township	Monmouth	67,106	66,522	+0.9%	40.949	106.06	1,638.8/sq mi (632.7/km^{2})	Special charter (New Jersey)	1798
Old Bridge Township	Township	Middlesex	66,876	65,375	+2.3%	38.181	98.89	1,751.6/sq mi (676.3/km^{2})	Faulkner Act (mayor–council)	1869 (Note: As Madison Township. Renamed Old Bridge in 1975.)
Gloucester Township	Township	Camden	66,034	64,634	+2.2%	22.954	59.45	2,876.8/sq mi (1,110.7/km^{2})	Faulkner Act (mayor–council)	1798
North Bergen	Township	Hudson	63,361	60,773	+4.3%	5.136	13.30	12,336.6/sq mi (4,763.2/km^{2})	Walsh Act	1843
Irvington	Township	Essex	61,176	53,926	+13.4%	2.914	7.55	20,993.8/sq mi (8,105.8/km^{2})	Faulkner Act (mayor–council)	1874
Piscataway	Township	Middlesex	60,804	56,044	+8.5%	18.794	48.68	3,235.3/sq mi (1,249.2/km^{2})	Faulkner Act (mayor–council)	1666
Vineland	City	Cumberland	60,780	60,724	+0.1%	68.393	177.14	888.7/sq mi (343.1/km^{2})	Faulkner Act (mayor–council)	1952
Hoboken	City	Hudson	60,419	50,005	+20.8%	1.250	3.24	48,335.2/sq mi (18,662.3/km^{2})	Faulkner Act (mayor–council)	1849
Union	Township	Union	59,728	56,642	+5.4%	9.051	23.44	6,599.0/sq mi (2,547.9/km^{2})	Township (New Jersey)	1808
Jackson Township	Township	Ocean	58,544	54,856	+6.7%	99.174	256.86	590.3/sq mi (227.9/km^{2})	Faulkner Act (mayor–council)	1844
Parsippany-Troy Hills	Township	Morris	56,162	53,238	+5.5%	23.632	61.21	2,376.5/sq mi (917.6/km^{2})	Faulkner Act (mayor–council)	1928
Perth Amboy	City	Middlesex	55,436	50,814	+9.1%	4.662	12.07	11,891.0/sq mi (4,591.2/km^{2})	Faulkner Act (mayor–council)	1718
New Brunswick	City	Middlesex	55,266	55,181	+0.2%	5.233	13.55	10,561.1/sq mi (4,077.6/km^{2})	Faulkner Act (mayor–council)	1784
Wayne	Township	Passaic	54,838	54,717	+0.2%	23.722	61.44	2,311.7/sq mi (892.5/km^{2})	Faulkner Act (mayor–council)	1847
Plainfield	City	Union	54,586	49,808	+9.6%	5.959	15.43	9,160.3/sq mi (3,536.8/km^{2})	Special charter (New Jersey)	1869
Howell	Township	Monmouth	53,537	51,075	+4.8%	60.271	156.10	888.3/sq mi (343.0/km^{2})	Faulkner Act (council–manager)	1801
Bloomfield	Township	Essex	53,105	47,315	+12.2%	5.337	13.82	9,950.3/sq mi (3,841.9/km^{2})	Special charter (New Jersey)	1812
West New York	Town	Hudson	52,912	49,708	+6.4%	0.994	2.57	53,231.4/sq mi (20,552.8/km^{2})	Walsh Act	1898
East Brunswick	Township	Middlesex	49,715	47,512	+4.6%	21.784	56.42	2,282.2/sq mi (881.2/km^{2})	Faulkner Act (mayor–council)	1860
West Orange	Township	Essex	48,843	46,207	+5.7%	12.003	31.09	4,069.2/sq mi (1,571.1/km^{2})	Faulkner Act (mayor–council)	1863
Washington Township	Township	Gloucester	48,677	48,559	+0.2%	21.346	55.29	2,280.4/sq mi (880.5/km^{2})	Faulkner Act (mayor–council)	1836
Monroe Township	Township	Middlesex	48,594	39,132	+24.2%	41.943	108.63	1,158.6/sq mi (447.3/km^{2})	Faulkner Act (mayor–council)	1838
Egg Harbor Township	Township	Atlantic	47,842	43,323	+10.4%	67.047	173.65	713.6/sq mi (275.5/km^{2})	Township (New Jersey)	1798
South Brunswick	Township	Middlesex	47,043	43,417	+8.4%	40.614	105.19	1,158.3/sq mi (447.2/km^{2})	Faulkner Act (council–manager)	1798
Evesham	Township	Burlington	46,826	45,538	+2.8%	29.156	75.51	1,606.1/sq mi (620.1/km^{2})	Faulkner Act (council–manager)	1798
Hackensack	City	Bergen	46,030	43,010	+7.0%	4.191	10.85	10,983.1/sq mi (4,240.6/km^{2})	1923 Municipal Manager Law	1693 (Note: As New Barbadoes Township. Renamed and reincorporated as Hackensack City in 1921.)
Bridgewater Township	Township	Somerset	45,977	44,464	+3.4%	31.888	82.59	1,441.8/sq mi (556.7/km^{2})	Faulkner Act (mayor–council)	1798
Sayreville	Borough	Middlesex	45,345	42,704	+6.2%	15.830	41.00	2,864.5/sq mi (1,106.0/km^{2})	Borough (New Jersey)	1876 (Note: As a Township. Reincorporated as a Borough in 1919.)
Manchester Township	Township	Ocean	45,115	43,070	+4.7%	81.417	210.87	554.1/sq mi (213.9/km^{2})	Faulkner Act (mayor–council)	1865
Mount Laurel	Township	Burlington	44,633	41,864	+6.6%	21.724	56.26	2,054.5/sq mi (793.3/km^{2})	Faulkner Act (council–manager)	1872
North Brunswick	Township	Middlesex	43,905	40,742	+7.8%	12.032	31.16	3,649.0/sq mi (1,408.9/km^{2})	Faulkner Act (mayor–council–administrator)	1798
Berkeley Township	Township	Ocean	43,754	41,255	+6.1%	42.710	110.62	1,024.4/sq mi (395.5/km^{2})	Faulkner Act (mayor–council)	1875
Linden	City	Union	43,738	40,499	+8.0%	10.688	27.68	4,092.3/sq mi (1,580.0/km^{2})	City (New Jersey)	1925
Hillsborough Township	Township	Somerset	43,276	38,303	+13.0%	54.614	141.45	792.4/sq mi (305.9/km^{2})	Township (New Jersey)	1771
Kearny	Town	Hudson	41,999	40,684	+3.2%	8.844	22.91	4,748.9/sq mi (1,833.5/km^{2})	Town (New Jersey)	1867
Marlboro	Township	Monmouth	41,502	40,191	+3.3%	30.340	78.58	1,367.9/sq mi (528.1/km^{2})	Faulkner Act (mayor–council)	1848
Teaneck	Township	Bergen	41,246	39,776	+3.7%	6.041	15.65	6,827.7/sq mi (2,636.2/km^{2})	Faulkner Act (council–manager)	1895
Montclair	Township	Essex	40,921	37,669	+8.6%	6.238	16.16	6,560.0/sq mi (2,532.8/km^{2})	Faulkner Act (council–manager)	1868
Manalapan	Township	Monmouth	40,905	38,872	+5.2%	30.651	79.39	1,334.5/sq mi (515.3/km^{2})	Township (New Jersey)	1848
Fort Lee	Borough	Bergen	40,191	35,345	+13.7%	2.518	6.52	15,961.5/sq mi (6,162.8/km^{2})	Borough (New Jersey)	1904
Winslow Township	Township	Camden	39,907	39,499	+1.0%	57.417	148.71	695.0/sq mi (268.4/km^{2})	Township (New Jersey)	1845
Atlantic City	City	Atlantic	38,497	39,558	−2.7%	10.760	27.87	3,577.8/sq mi (1,381.4/km^{2})	Faulkner Act (mayor–council)	1854
Belleville	Township	Essex	38,222	35,926	+6.4%	3.296	8.54	11,596.5/sq mi (4,477.4/km^{2})	Faulkner Act (council–manager)	1839
Galloway	Township	Atlantic	37,813	37,349	+1.2%	88.668	229.65	426.5/sq mi (164.7/km^{2})	Faulkner Act (council–manager)	1798
Ewing Township	Township	Mercer	37,264	35,790	+4.1%	15.206	39.38	2,450.6/sq mi (946.2/km^{2})	Faulkner Act (mayor–council)	1834
Monroe Township	Township	Gloucester	37,117	36,129	+2.7%	46.421	120.23	799.6/sq mi (308.7/km^{2})	Faulkner Act (mayor–council)	1859
Pennsauken	Township	Camden	37,074	35,885	+3.3%	10.479	27.14	3,537.9/sq mi (1,366.0/km^{2})	Township (New Jersey)	1892
Freehold Township	Township	Monmouth	35,369	36,184	−2.3%	38.653	100.11	915.0/sq mi (353.3/km^{2})	Township (New Jersey)	1798
Fair Lawn	Borough	Bergen	34,927	32,457	+7.6%	5.135	13.30	6,801.8/sq mi (2,626.2/km^{2})	Faulkner Act (council–manager)	1924
Orange	Township	Essex	34,447	30,134	+14.3%	2.213	5.73	15,565.7/sq mi (6,010.0/km^{2})	Faulkner Act (mayor–council)	1806
Lawrence Township	Township	Mercer	33,077	33,472	−1.2%	21.725	56.27	1,522.5/sq mi (587.9/km^{2})	Faulkner Act (council–manager)	1798 (Note: As Maidenhead Township. Renamed Lawrence in 1816.)
Garfield	City	Bergen	32,655	30,487	+7.1%	2.111	5.47	15,469.0/sq mi (5,972.6/km^{2})	1923 Municipal Manager Law	1898 (Note: As a Borough. Reincorporated as a City in 1917.)
Deptford	Township	Gloucester	31,977	30,561	+4.6%	17.331	44.89	1,845.1/sq mi (712.4/km^{2})	Faulkner Act (council–manager)	1798
Willingboro	Township	Burlington	31,889	31,629	+0.8%	7.725	20.01	4,128.0/sq mi (1,593.8/km^{2})	Faulkner Act (council–manager)	1798
Long Branch	City	Monmouth	31,667	30,719	+3.1%	5.124	13.27	6,180.1/sq mi (2,386.2/km^{2})	Faulkner Act (mayor–council)	1867 (Note: As Long Branch Commission. Renamed and reincorporated as Long Branch City in 1903.)
Livingston	Township	Essex	31,330	29,366	+6.7%	13.785	35.70	2,272.8/sq mi (877.5/km^{2})	Faulkner Act (council–manager)	1813
Voorhees	Township	Camden	31,069	29,131	+6.7%	11.471	29.71	2,708.5/sq mi (1,045.8/km^{2})	Township (New Jersey)	1899
Westfield	Town	Union	31,032	30,316	+2.4%	6.724	17.42	4,615.1/sq mi (1,781.9/km^{2})	Special charter (New Jersey)	1798 (Note: As a Township. Reincorporated as a Town in 1903.)
Princeton	Borough	Mercer	30,681	28,400	+8.0%	17.946	46.48	1,709.6/sq mi (660.1/km^{2})	Borough (New Jersey)	1813/2013 (Note: Princeton Township and Princeton Borough merged on January 1, 2013. The 2010 population is tabulated from the sum of the two municipalities' 2010 populations. Though it has a borough form of government, the municipality type is classified by the state government as other.)
Nutley	Township	Essex	30,143	28,117	+7.2%	3.372	8.73	8,939.2/sq mi (3,451.4/km^{2})	Walsh Act	1874 (Note: As Franklin Township. Renamed Nutley in 1902.)
East Windsor	Township	Mercer	30,045	27,165	+10.6%	15.567	40.32	1,930.0/sq mi (745.2/km^{2})	Faulkner Act (council–manager)	1798
Rahway	City	Union	29,556	27,291	+8.3%	3.896	10.09	7,586.2/sq mi (2,929.1/km^{2})	Faulkner Act (mayor–council)	1858
West Windsor	Township	Mercer	29,518	27,147	+8.7%	25.549	66.17	1,155.3/sq mi (446.1/km^{2})	Faulkner Act (mayor–council)	1798
Englewood	City	Bergen	29,308	26,764	+9.5%	4.925	12.76	5,950.9/sq mi (2,297.6/km^{2})	Special charter (New Jersey)	1899
Mount Olive	Township	Morris	28,886	27,935	+3.4%	29.617	76.71	975.3/sq mi (376.6/km^{2})	Faulkner Act (mayor–council)	1871
Lacey Township	Township	Ocean	28,655	27,346	+4.8%	83.248	215.61	344.2/sq mi (132.9/km^{2})	Township (New Jersey)	1871
Stafford Township	Township	Ocean	28,617	26,503	+8.0%	46.114	119.43	620.6/sq mi (239.6/km^{2})	Faulkner Act (small municipality)	1798
Bergenfield	Borough	Bergen	28,321	26,652	+6.3%	2.904	7.52	9,752.4/sq mi (3,765.4/km^{2})	Borough (New Jersey)	1894
Neptune Township	Township	Monmouth	28,061	27,912	+0.5%	8.127	21.05	3,452.8/sq mi (1,333.1/km^{2})	Township (New Jersey)	1879
Bernards Township	Township	Somerset	27,830	26,535	+4.9%	24.201	62.68	1,150.0/sq mi (444.0/km^{2})	Township (New Jersey)	1798
Ocean Township	Township	Monmouth	27,672	27,190	+1.8%	10.867	28.15	2,546.4/sq mi (983.2/km^{2})	Faulkner Act (council–manager)	1849
Millville	City	Cumberland	27,491	28,370	−3.1%	41.999	108.78	654.6/sq mi (252.7/km^{2})	Walsh Act	1801 (Note: As a Township. Reincorporated as a City in 1866.)
Hamilton Township	Township	Atlantic	27,484	26,342	+4.3%	110.895	287.22	247.8/sq mi (95.7/km^{2})	Township (New Jersey)	1813
Bridgeton	City	Cumberland	27,263	24,958	+9.2%	6.228	16.13	4,377.5/sq mi (1,690.2/km^{2})	Faulkner Act (mayor–council)	1865
Pemberton Township	Township	Burlington	26,903	27,644	−2.7%	61.556	159.43	437.0/sq mi (168.7/km^{2})	Faulkner Act (mayor–council)	1846
Paramus	Borough	Bergen	26,698	26,164	+2.0%	10.445	27.05	2,556.1/sq mi (986.9/km^{2})	Borough (New Jersey)	1922
Wall	Township	Monmouth	26,525	25,890	+2.5%	30.659	79.41	865.2/sq mi (334.0/km^{2})	Township (New Jersey)	1851
Randolph	Township	Morris	26,504	25,349	+4.6%	20.905	54.14	1,267.8/sq mi (489.5/km^{2})	Faulkner Act (council–manager)	1806
Lodi	Borough	Bergen	26,206	23,943	+9.5%	2.272	5.88	11,534.3/sq mi (4,453.4/km^{2})	1923 Municipal Manager Law	1894
Ridgewood	Village	Bergen	25,979	24,156	+7.5%	5.742	14.87	4,524.4/sq mi (1,746.9/km^{2})	Faulkner Act (council–manager)	1894
Cliffside Park	Borough	Bergen	25,693	23,510	+9.3%	0.956	2.48	26,875.5/sq mi (10,376.7/km^{2})		1895
Maplewood	Township	Essex	25,684	23,594	+8.9%	3.874	10.03	6,629.8/sq mi (2,559.8/km^{2})		1861 (Note: As South Orange Township. Renamed Maplewood in 1922.)
Mahwah	Township	Bergen	25,487	25,850	−1.4%	25.392	65.76	1,003.7/sq mi (387.5/km^{2})	Faulkner Act (mayor–council)	1849 (Note: As Hohokus Township. Renamed Mahwah in 1944.)
Rockaway Township	Township	Morris	25,341	24,136	+5.0%	41.733	108.09	607.2/sq mi (234.4/km^{2})	Faulkner Act (mayor–council)	1844
Carteret	Borough	Middlesex	25,326	22,625	+11.9%	4.391	11.37	5,767.7/sq mi (2,226.9/km^{2})		1906 (Note: As Roosevelt Borough. Renamed Carteret in 1922.)
Scotch Plains	Township	Union	24,968	23,385	+6.8%	9.021	23.36	2,767.8/sq mi (1,068.6/km^{2})	Faulkner Act (council–manager)	1878 (Note: As Fanwood Township. Renamed Scotch Plains in 1917.)
West Milford	Township	Passaic	24,862	25,734	−3.4%	75.932	196.66	327.4/sq mi (126.4/km^{2})	Faulkner Act (mayor–council–administrator)	1834
Medford	Township	Burlington	24,497	22,999	+6.5%	38.799	100.49	631.4/sq mi (243.8/km^{2})	Faulkner Act (council–manager)	1847
South Plainfield	Borough	Middlesex	24,338	23,324	+4.3%	8.296	21.49	2,933.7/sq mi (1,132.7/km^{2})		1926
Barnegat Township	Township	Ocean	24,296	20,726	+17.2%	34.239	88.68	709.6/sq mi (274.0/km^{2})		1846 (Note: As Union Township. Renamed Barnegat in 1977.)
Plainsboro Township	Township	Middlesex	24,084	22,866	+5.3%	11.738	30.40	2,051.8/sq mi (792.2/km^{2})		1919
Burlington Township	Township	Burlington	23,983	22,306	+7.5%	13.476	34.90	1,779.7/sq mi (687.1/km^{2})		1798
Cranford	Township	Union	23,847	22,594	+5.5%	4.835	12.52	4,932.2/sq mi (1,904.3/km^{2})		1871
Montgomery Township	Township	Somerset	23,690	22,185	+6.8%	32.300	83.66	733.4/sq mi (283.2/km^{2})		1798
Raritan Township	Township	Hunterdon	23,447	21,936	+6.9%	37.482	97.08	625.6/sq mi (241.5/km^{2})		1838
Glassboro	Borough	Gloucester	23,149	18,533	+24.9%	9.320	24.14	2,483.8/sq mi (959.0/km^{2})		1878
Morris Township	Township	Morris	22,974	22,254	+3.2%	15.682	40.62	1,465.0/sq mi (565.6/km^{2})		1798
Roxbury	Township	Morris	22,950	23,033	−0.4%	20.852	54.01	1,100.6/sq mi (424.9/km^{2})	Faulkner Act (council–manager)	1798
North Plainfield	Borough	Somerset	22,808	21,677	+5.2%	2.807	7.27	8,125.4/sq mi (3,137.2/km^{2})		1885
Summit	City	Union	22,719	21,404	+6.1%	5.994	15.52	3,790.3/sq mi (1,463.4/km^{2})	City (New Jersey)	1899
Roselle	Borough	Union	22,695	20,936	+8.4%	2.635	6.82	8,612.9/sq mi (3,325.5/km^{2})		1894
Lyndhurst	Township	Bergen	22,519	20,334	+10.7%	4.584	11.87	4,912.5/sq mi (1,896.7/km^{2})	Walsh Act	1852 (Note: As Union Township. Renamed Lyndhurst in 1917.)
Hillside	Township	Union	22,456	21,314	+5.4%	2.767	7.17	8,115.6/sq mi (3,133.5/km^{2})		1913
Montville	Township	Morris	22,450	21,457	+4.6%	18.627	48.24	1,205.2/sq mi (465.3/km^{2})	Special charter (New Jersey)	1867
Vernon Township	Township	Sussex	22,358	23,867	−6.3%	67.595	175.07	330.8/sq mi (127.7/km^{2})	Faulkner Act (mayor–council)	1798
West Deptford	Township	Gloucester	22,197	21,528	+3.1%	15.357	39.77	1,445.4/sq mi (558.1/km^{2})		1871
Secaucus	Town	Hudson	22,181	16,198	+36.9%	5.826	15.09	3,807.2/sq mi (1,470.0/km^{2})	Town (New Jersey)	1900
Lower Township	Township	Cape May	22,057	22,844	−3.4%	27.378	70.91	805.6/sq mi (311.1/km^{2})	Faulkner Act (council–manager)	1798
Millburn	Township	Essex	21,710	20,065	+8.2%	9.333	24.17	2,326.2/sq mi (898.1/km^{2})		1857
Lindenwold	Borough	Camden	21,641	17,479	+23.8%	3.902	10.11	5,546.1/sq mi (2,141.4/km^{2})		1929
Elmwood Park	Borough	Bergen	21,422	19,131	+12.0%	2.643	6.85	8,105.2/sq mi (3,129.4/km^{2})		1916 (Note: As East Paterson Borough. Renamed Elmwood Park in 1973.)
Moorestown	Township	Burlington	21,355	20,554	+3.9%	14.729	38.15	1,449.9/sq mi (559.8/km^{2})	Faulkner Act (council–manager)	1922
Little Egg Harbor Township	Township	Ocean	20,784	19,722	+5.4%	47.346	122.63	439.0/sq mi (169.5/km^{2})		1798
Pleasantville	City	Atlantic	20,629	20,149	+2.4%	5.721	14.82	3,605.8/sq mi (1,392.2/km^{2})	City (New Jersey)	1889
Jefferson	Township	Morris	20,538	21,085	−2.6%	38.903	100.76	527.9/sq mi (203.8/km^{2})		1804
Middle Township	Township	Cape May	20,380	18,791	+8.5%	70.238	181.92	290.2/sq mi (112.0/km^{2})		1798
Palisades Park	Borough	Bergen	20,292	19,403	+4.6%	1.239	3.21	16,377.7/sq mi (6,323.5/km^{2})		1899
Morristown	Town	Morris	20,180	18,392	+9.7%	2.909	7.53	6,937.1/sq mi (2,678.4/km^{2})	Faulkner Act (mayor–council)	1865
Hazlet	Township	Monmouth	20,125	20,249	−0.6%	5.569	14.42	3,613.8/sq mi (1,395.3/km^{2})		1848 (Note: As Raritan Township. Renamed Hazlet in 1967.)
Maple Shade	Township	Burlington	19,980	18,911	+5.7%	3.827	9.91	5,220.8/sq mi (2,015.8/km^{2})	Faulkner Act (council–manager)	1798 (Note: As Chester Township. Renamed Maple Shade in 1945.)
Hawthorne	Borough	Passaic	19,637	18,579	+5.7%	3.318	8.59	5,918.3/sq mi (2,285.1/km^{2})		1898
Sparta	Township	Sussex	19,600	19,622	−0.1%	36.788	95.28	532.8/sq mi (205.7/km^{2})	Faulkner Act (council–manager)	1845
Harrison	Town	Hudson	19,450	13,574	+43.3%	1.211	3.14	16,061.1/sq mi (6,201.2/km^{2})	Town (New Jersey)	1840
Aberdeen	Township	Monmouth	19,329	18,157	+6.5%	5.444	14.10	3,550.5/sq mi (1,370.9/km^{2})	Faulkner Act (council–manager)	1857 (Note: As Matavan Township. Renamed Aberdeen in 1977.)
Tinton Falls	Borough	Monmouth	19,181	17,613	+8.9%	15.475	40.08	1,239.5/sq mi (478.6/km^{2})		1950 (Note: As New Shrewsbury Borough. Renamed Tinton Falls in 1975.)
Point Pleasant	Borough	Ocean	18,941	18,210	+4.0%	3.491	9.04	5,425.7/sq mi (2,094.9/km^{2})		1920
Rutherford	Borough	Bergen	18,834	17,892	+5.3%	2.781	7.20	6,772.4/sq mi (2,614.8/km^{2})		1881
South Orange	Village	Essex	18,484	16,126	+14.6%	2.846	7.37	6,494.7/sq mi (2,507.6/km^{2})	Village (New Jersey)	1869
Dover	Town	Morris	18,460	18,061	+2.2%	2.676	6.93	6,898.4/sq mi (2,663.5/km^{2})	Town (New Jersey)	1896
Washington Township	Township	Morris	18,197	18,411	−1.2%	44.582	115.47	408.2/sq mi (157.6/km^{2})		1798
Delran Township	Township	Burlington	17,882	16,820	+6.3%	6.630	17.17	2,697.1/sq mi (1,041.4/km^{2})		1880
Dumont	Borough	Bergen	17,863	17,304	+3.2%	1.949	5.05	9,165.2/sq mi (3,538.7/km^{2})		1894
Hopewell Township	Township	Mercer	17,491	16,896	+3.5%	58.071	150.40	301.2/sq mi (116.3/km^{2})		1798
Holmdel	Township	Monmouth	17,400	16,696	+4.2%	17.847	46.22	975.0/sq mi (376.4/km^{2})		1857
Weehawken	Township	Hudson	17,197	12,417	+38.5%	0.784	2.03	21,934.9/sq mi (8,469.1/km^{2})	Faulkner Act (council–manager)	1859
Springfield	Township	Union	17,178	15,569	+10.3%	5.157	13.36	3,331.0/sq mi (1,286.1/km^{2})		1798
Denville	Township	Morris	17,107	16,341	+4.7%	11.992	31.06	1,426.5/sq mi (550.8/km^{2})		1913
Cinnaminson	Township	Burlington	17,064	15,540	+9.8%	7.424	19.23	2,298.5/sq mi (887.5/km^{2})		1860
Madison	Borough	Morris	16,937	15,817	+7.1%	4.313	11.17	3,927.0/sq mi (1,516.2/km^{2})		1889
New Milford	Borough	Bergen	16,923	16,264	+4.1%	2.283	5.91	7,412.6/sq mi (2,862.0/km^{2})		1922
Wyckoff	Township	Bergen	16,585	16,635	−0.3%	6.591	17.07	2,516.3/sq mi (971.6/km^{2})		1926
North Arlington	Borough	Bergen	16,457	15,311	+7.5%	2.484	6.43	6,625.2/sq mi (2,558.0/km^{2})		1896
Franklin Township	Township	Gloucester	16,380	16,773	−2.3%	55.830	144.60	293.4/sq mi (113.3/km^{2})		1820
Readington Township	Township	Hunterdon	16,128	16,116	+0.1%	47.558	123.17	339.1/sq mi (130.9/km^{2})		1798
South River	Borough	Middlesex	16,118	15,845	+1.7%	2.785	7.21	5,787.4/sq mi (2,234.5/km^{2})		1898
Warren Township	Township	Somerset	15,923	15,217	+4.6%	19.566	50.68	813.8/sq mi (314.2/km^{2})		1806
Pequannock	Township	Morris	15,571	15,392	+1.2%	6.787	17.58	2,294.2/sq mi (885.8/km^{2})	Faulkner Act (council–manager)	1798
Clark	Township	Union	15,544	14,707	+5.7%	4.273	11.07	3,637.7/sq mi (1,404.5/km^{2})		1864
Robbinsville Township	Township	Mercer	15,476	13,635	+13.5%	20.441	52.94	757.1/sq mi (292.3/km^{2})	Faulkner Act (mayor–council)	1859 (Note: As Washington Township. Renamed Robbinsville in 2008.)
Tenafly	Borough	Bergen	15,409	14,473	+6.5%	4.586	11.88	3,360.0/sq mi (1,297.3/km^{2})	Special charter (New Jersey)	1894
Haddon Township	Township	Camden	15,407	14,488	+6.3%	2.692	6.97	5,723.3/sq mi (2,209.8/km^{2})	Walsh Act	1865
Phillipsburg	Town	Warren	15,249	14,791	+3.1%	3.191	8.26	4,778.8/sq mi (1,845.1/km^{2})		1861
Mantua Township	Township	Gloucester	15,235	15,147	+0.6%	16.005	41.45	951.9/sq mi (367.5/km^{2})		1853
Asbury Park	City	Monmouth	15,188	16,008	−5.1%	1.429	3.70	10,628.4/sq mi (4,103.7/km^{2})	Faulkner Act (council–manager)	1874
Highland Park	Borough	Middlesex	15,072	13,926	+8.2%	1.821	4.72	8,276.8/sq mi (3,195.7/km^{2})		1905
Metuchen	Borough	Middlesex	15,049	13,478	+11.7%	2.849	7.38	5,282.2/sq mi (2,039.5/km^{2})		1900
Fairview	Borough	Bergen	15,025	13,712	+9.6%	0.844	2.19	17,802.1/sq mi (6,873.4/km^{2})		1894
Branchburg	Township	Somerset	14,940	14,432	+3.5%	20.071	51.98	744.4/sq mi (287.4/km^{2})		1845
Ramsey	Borough	Bergen	14,798	14,459	+2.3%	5.503	14.25	2,689.1/sq mi (1,038.3/km^{2})		1908
Hammonton	Town	Atlantic	14,711	14,756	−0.3%	40.749	105.54	361.0/sq mi (139.4/km^{2})	Town (New Jersey)	1866
Hanover	Township	Morris	14,677	13,659	+7.5%	10.513	27.23	1,396.1/sq mi (539.0/km^{2})		1740
Middlesex	Borough	Middlesex	14,636	13,620	+7.5%	3.488	9.03	4,196.1/sq mi (1,620.1/km^{2})		1913
Verona	Township	Essex	14,572	13,297	+9.6%	2.794	7.24	5,215.5/sq mi (2,013.7/km^{2})	Faulkner Act (council–manager)	1907
Hopatcong	Borough	Sussex	14,362	14,950	−3.9%	10.889	28.20	1,318.9/sq mi (509.2/km^{2})		1898 (Note: As Town of Brooklyn. Renamed Hopatcong in 1901.)
Edgewater	Borough	Bergen	14,336	11,513	+24.5%	0.971	2.51	14,764.2/sq mi (5,700.5/km^{2})		1894 (Note: As Undercliff Borough. Renamed Edgewater in 1899.)
Saddle Brook	Township	Bergen	14,294	13,642	+4.8%	2.692	6.97	5,309.8/sq mi (2,050.1/km^{2})		1716 (Note: As Saddle River Township. Renamed Saddle Brook in 1955.)
Collingswood	Borough	Camden	14,186	13,835	+2.5%	1.830	4.74	7,751.9/sq mi (2,993.0/km^{2})	Walsh Act	1888
Roselle Park	Borough	Union	13,967	13,183	+5.9%	1.225	3.17	11,401.6/sq mi (4,402.2/km^{2})		1901
New Providence	Borough	Union	13,650	12,171	+12.2%	3.688	9.55	3,701.2/sq mi (1,429.0/km^{2})		1899
Harrison Township	Township	Gloucester	13,641	12,411	+9.9%	18.932	49.03	720.5/sq mi (278.2/km^{2})		1844 (Note: As Spicer Township. Renamed Harrison in 1845.)
Eatontown	Borough	Monmouth	13,597	12,559	+8.3%	5.841	15.13	2,327.9/sq mi (898.8/km^{2})		1873
Clinton Township	Township	Hunterdon	13,505	13,409	+0.7%	29.869	77.36	452.1/sq mi (174.6/km^{2})	Faulkner Act (small municipality)	1841
Woodland Park	Borough	Passaic	13,484	11,819	+14.1%	2.939	7.61	4,588.0/sq mi (1,771.4/km^{2})	Faulkner Act (small municipality)	1914 (Note: As West Paterson Borough. Renamed Woodland Park in 2009.)
Little Falls	Township	Passaic	13,360	13,982	−4.4%	2.795	7.24	4,780.0/sq mi (1,845.6/km^{2})		1868
Berkeley Heights	Township	Union	13,285	12,754	+4.2%	6.220	16.11	2,135.9/sq mi (824.7/km^{2})		1809 (Note: As New Providence Township. Renamed Berkeley Heights in 1951.)
Ridgefield Park	Village	Bergen	13,224	12,729	+3.9%	1.705	4.42	7,756.0/sq mi (2,994.6/km^{2})		1892
Cedar Grove	Township	Essex	12,980	12,373	+4.9%	4.237	10.97	3,063.5/sq mi (1,182.8/km^{2})	Faulkner Act (council–manager)	1892 (Note: As Verona Township. Renamed Cedar Grove in 1908.)
Red Bank	Borough	Monmouth	12,936	12,206	+6.0%	1.746	4.52	7,408.9/sq mi (2,860.6/km^{2})		1870
Florence Township	Township	Burlington	12,812	12,109	+5.8%	9.769	25.30	1,311.5/sq mi (506.4/km^{2})		1872
Lumberton	Township	Burlington	12,803	12,554	+2.0%	12.881	33.36	993.9/sq mi (383.8/km^{2})		1860
Oakland	Borough	Bergen	12,748	12,754	0.0%	8.502	22.02	1,499.4/sq mi (578.9/km^{2})		1902
Pennsville Township	Township	Salem	12,684	13,332	−4.9%	21.266	55.08	596.4/sq mi (230.3/km^{2})		1798 (Note: As Lower Penns Neck Township. Renamed Pennsville in 1965.)
Florham Park	Borough	Morris	12,585	11,696	+7.6%	7.308	18.93	1,722.1/sq mi (664.9/km^{2})	Borough (New Jersey)	1899
Woolwich Township	Township	Gloucester	12,577	10,200	+23.3%	21.072	54.58	596.9/sq mi (230.4/km^{2})		1798
Haddonfield	Borough	Camden	12,550	11,593	+8.3%	2.796	7.24	4,488.6/sq mi (1,733.0/km^{2})	Walsh Act	1875
Upper Township	Township	Cape May	12,539	12,307	+1.9%	62.027	160.65	202.2/sq mi (78.1/km^{2})		1798
Freehold Borough	Borough	Monmouth	12,538	12,052	+4.0%	1.932	5.00	6,489.6/sq mi (2,505.7/km^{2})		1869
Somerville	Borough	Somerset	12,346	12,098	+2.0%	2.338	6.06	5,280.6/sq mi (2,038.8/km^{2})		1863
Glen Rock	Borough	Bergen	12,133	11,601	+4.6%	2.703	7.00	4,488.7/sq mi (1,733.1/km^{2})		1894
Hasbrouck Heights	Borough	Bergen	12,125	11,842	+2.4%	1.523	3.94	7,961.3/sq mi (3,073.9/km^{2})		1894
River Edge	Borough	Bergen	12,049	11,340	+6.3%	1.833	4.75	6,573.4/sq mi (2,538.0/km^{2})		1894
Guttenberg	Town	Hudson	12,017	11,176	+7.5%	0.193	0.50	62,264.2/sq mi (24,040.4/km^{2})	Town (New Jersey)	1859
Bound Brook	Borough	Somerset	11,988	10,402	+15.2%	1.661	4.30	7,217.3/sq mi (2,786.6/km^{2})		1891
Wallington	Borough	Bergen	11,868	11,335	+4.7%	0.994	2.57	11,939.6/sq mi (4,609.9/km^{2})		1894
Bordentown Township	Township	Burlington	11,791	11,367	+3.7%	8.663	22.44	1,361.1/sq mi (525.5/km^{2})		1852
Ringwood	Borough	Passaic	11,735	12,228	−4.0%	25.588	66.27	458.6/sq mi (177.1/km^{2})	Faulkner Act (council–manager)	1918
Bellmawr	Borough	Camden	11,707	11,583	+1.1%	2.984	7.73	3,923.3/sq mi (1,514.8/km^{2})		1926
East Greenwich Township	Township	Gloucester	11,706	9,555	+22.5%	14.443	37.41	810.5/sq mi (312.9/km^{2})		1881
Ridgefield	Borough	Bergen	11,501	11,032	+4.3%	2.543	6.59	4,522.6/sq mi (1,746.2/km^{2})	Walsh Act	1892
Gloucester City	City	Camden	11,484	11,456	+0.2%	2.315	6.00	4,960.7/sq mi (1,915.3/km^{2})	Special charter (New Jersey)	1868
Wanaque	Borough	Passaic	11,317	11,116	+1.8%	8.066	20.89	1,403.0/sq mi (541.7/km^{2})		1918
Westwood	Borough	Bergen	11,282	10,908	+3.4%	2.259	5.85	4,994.2/sq mi (1,928.3/km^{2})		1894
Ocean City	City	Cape May	11,229	11,701	−4.0%	6.753	17.49	1,662.8/sq mi (642.0/km^{2})		1884
Pompton Lakes	Borough	Passaic	11,127	11,097	+0.3%	2.887	7.48	3,854.2/sq mi (1,488.1/km^{2})		1895
East Hanover	Township	Morris	11,105	11,157	−0.5%	7.875	20.40	1,410.2/sq mi (544.5/km^{2})	Faulkner Act (small municipality)	1928
Franklin Lakes	Borough	Bergen	11,079	10,590	+4.6%	9.414	24.38	1,176.9/sq mi (454.4/km^{2})		1922
Totowa	Borough	Passaic	11,065	10,804	+2.4%	4.000	10.36	2,766.3/sq mi (1,068.1/km^{2})		1898
West Caldwell	Township	Essex	11,012	10,759	+2.4%	5.097	13.20	2,160.5/sq mi (834.2/km^{2})		1904
Little Ferry	Borough	Bergen	10,987	10,626	+3.4%	1.477	3.83	7,438.7/sq mi (2,872.1/km^{2})		1894
Chatham Township	Township	Morris	10,983	10,452	+5.1%	9.078	23.51	1,209.8/sq mi (467.1/km^{2})		1806
Manville	Borough	Somerset	10,953	10,344	+5.9%	2.361	6.11	4,639.1/sq mi (1,791.2/km^{2})		1929
Lincoln Park	Borough	Morris	10,915	10,521	+3.7%	6.398	16.57	1,706.0/sq mi (658.7/km^{2})		1922
Beachwood	Borough	Ocean	10,859	11,045	−1.7%	2.763	7.16	3,930.1/sq mi (1,517.4/km^{2})		1917
Wantage Township	Township	Sussex	10,811	11,358	−4.8%	66.760	172.91	161.9/sq mi (62.5/km^{2})		1798
Pine Hill	Borough	Camden	10,764	10,245	+5.1%	4.866	12.60	2,212.1/sq mi (854.1/km^{2})		1929 (Note: Pine Hill and Pine Valley merged on January 1, 2022. The 2010 and 2020 populations and area are tabulated from the sum of the same from the two municipalities.)
Somers Point	City	Atlantic	10,469	10,795	−3.0%	4.010	10.39	2,610.7/sq mi (1,008.0/km^{2})	City (New Jersey)	1886
Waterford Township	Township	Camden	10,421	10,649	−2.1%	36.002	93.24	289.5/sq mi (111.8/km^{2})		1798
Millstone Township	Township	Monmouth	10,376	10,566	−1.8%	36.607	94.81	283.4/sq mi (109.4/km^{2})		1844
Southampton	Township	Burlington	10,317	10,464	−1.4%	43.957	113.85	234.7/sq mi (90.6/km^{2})		1845
Hackettstown	Town	Warren	10,248	9,724	+5.4%	3.612	9.36	2,837.2/sq mi (1,095.5/km^{2})	Special charter (New Jersey)	1853
Hillsdale	Borough	Bergen	10,143	10,219	−0.7%	2.902	7.52	3,495.2/sq mi (1,349.5/km^{2})		1898
Wood-Ridge	Borough	Bergen	10,137	7,626	+32.9%	1.114	2.89	9,099.6/sq mi (3,513.4/km^{2})		1894
Maywood	Borough	Bergen	10,080	9,555	+5.5%	1.287	3.33	7,832.2/sq mi (3,024.0/km^{2})		1894
Waldwick	Borough	Bergen	10,058	9,625	+4.5%	2.046	5.30	4,915.9/sq mi (1,898.1/km^{2})		1919
East Rutherford	Borough	Bergen	10,022	8,913	+12.4%	3.712	9.61	2,699.9/sq mi (1,042.4/km^{2})		1889
Mount Holly	Township	Burlington	9,981	9,536	+4.7%	2.824	7.31	3,534.3/sq mi (1,364.6/km^{2})	Faulkner Act (council–manager)	1798 (Note: As Northampton Township. Renamed Mount Holly in 1931.)
Kinnelon	Borough	Morris	9,966	10,248	−2.8%	18.029	46.69	552.8/sq mi (213.4/km^{2})		1922
Woodbury	City	Gloucester	9,963	10,174	−2.1%	2.020	5.23	4,932.2/sq mi (1,904.3/km^{2})	City (New Jersey)	1854
Colts Neck	Township	Monmouth	9,957	10,142	−1.8%	30.715	79.55	324.2/sq mi (125.2/km^{2})		1847 (Note: As Atlantic Township. Renamed Colts Neck in 1962.)
River Vale	Township	Bergen	9,909	9,659	+2.6%	4.070	10.54	2,434.6/sq mi (940.0/km^{2})		1906
Keansburg	Borough	Monmouth	9,755	10,105	−3.5%	1.072	2.78	9,099.8/sq mi (3,513.5/km^{2})	Faulkner Act (council–manager)	1917
Burlington City	City	Burlington	9,743	9,920	−1.8%	3.035	7.86	3,210.2/sq mi (1,239.5/km^{2})		1784
Matawan	Borough	Monmouth	9,565	8,810	+8.6%	2.266	5.87	4,221.1/sq mi (1,629.8/km^{2})		1895
Chesterfield	Township	Burlington	9,422	7,699	+22.4%	21.311	55.20	442.1/sq mi (170.7/km^{2})		1798
South Amboy	City	Middlesex	9,411	8,631	+9.0%	1.538	3.98	6,119.0/sq mi (2,362.6/km^{2})		1798
Leonia	Borough	Bergen	9,304	8,937	+4.1%	1.523	3.94	6,109.0/sq mi (2,358.7/km^{2})		1894
Washington Township	Township	Bergen	9,285	9,102	+2.0%	2.953	7.65	3,144.3/sq mi (1,214.0/km^{2})		1840
Chatham Borough	Borough	Morris	9,212	8,962	+2.8%	2.347	6.08	3,925.0/sq mi (1,515.5/km^{2})		1892
Ventnor City	City	Atlantic	9,210	10,650	−13.5%	1.955	5.06	4,711.0/sq mi (1,818.9/km^{2})	Walsh Act	1903
Cresskill	Borough	Bergen	9,155	8,573	+6.8%	2.065	5.35	4,433.4/sq mi (1,711.8/km^{2})		1894
Absecon	City	Atlantic	9,137	8,411	+8.6%	5.468	14.16	1,671.0/sq mi (645.2/km^{2})	City (New Jersey)	1872
Westampton	Township	Burlington	9,121	8,813	+3.5%	10.974	28.42	831.1/sq mi (320.9/km^{2})		1850
Haledon	Borough	Passaic	9,052	8,318	+8.8%	1.215	3.15	7,450.2/sq mi (2,876.5/km^{2})		1908
Caldwell	Borough	Essex	9,027	7,822	+15.4%	1.178	3.05	7,663.0/sq mi (2,958.7/km^{2})		1892
Edgewater Park	Township	Burlington	8,930	8,881	+0.6%	2.919	7.56	3,059.3/sq mi (1,181.2/km^{2})		1924
North Haledon	Borough	Passaic	8,927	8,417	+6.1%	3.464	8.97	2,577.1/sq mi (995.0/km^{2})		1901
Mansfield Township	Township	Burlington	8,897	8,544	+4.1%	21.733	56.29	409.4/sq mi (158.1/km^{2})		1798
Park Ridge	Borough	Bergen	8,883	8,645	+2.8%	2.607	6.75	3,407.4/sq mi (1,315.6/km^{2})		1894
Ocean Township	Township	Ocean	8,835	8,332	+6.0%	20.866	54.04	423.4/sq mi (163.5/km^{2})		1876
Boonton Town	Town	Morris	8,815	8,347	+5.6%	2.335	6.05	3,775.2/sq mi (1,457.6/km^{2})	Town (New Jersey)	1866
Clayton	Borough	Gloucester	8,807	8,179	+7.7%	7.075	18.32	1,244.8/sq mi (480.6/km^{2})		1858
Pitman	Borough	Gloucester	8,780	9,011	−2.6%	2.218	5.74	3,958.5/sq mi (1,528.4/km^{2})		1905
Bogota	Borough	Bergen	8,778	8,187	+7.2%	0.755	1.96	11,626.5/sq mi (4,489.0/km^{2})		1894
Pittsgrove	Township	Salem	8,777	9,393	−6.6%	44.899	116.29	195.5/sq mi (75.5/km^{2})		1798
Lopatcong	Township	Warren	8,776	8,014	+9.5%	7.316	18.95	1,199.6/sq mi (463.2/km^{2})	Faulkner Act (small municipality)	1851
Audubon	Borough	Camden	8,707	8,819	−1.3%	1.482	3.84	5,875.2/sq mi (2,268.4/km^{2})	Walsh Act	1905
Carneys Point	Township	Salem	8,637	8,049	+7.3%	16.912	43.80	510.7/sq mi (197.2/km^{2})		1798 (Note: As Upper Penns Neck Township. Renamed Carneys Point in 1976.)
Long Hill	Township	Morris	8,629	8,702	−0.8%	11.797	30.55	731.5/sq mi (282.4/km^{2})		1866 (Note: As Passaic Township. Renamed Long Hill in 1992.)
Closter	Borough	Bergen	8,594	8,373	+2.6%	3.160	8.18	2,719.6/sq mi (1,050.1/km^{2})		1904
West Long Branch	Borough	Monmouth	8,587	8,097	+6.1%	2.856	7.40	3,006.7/sq mi (1,160.9/km^{2})		1908
Montvale	Borough	Bergen	8,436	7,844	+7.5%	4.023	10.42	2,096.9/sq mi (809.6/km^{2})		1894
Northfield	City	Atlantic	8,434	8,624	−2.2%	3.582	9.28	2,354.6/sq mi (909.1/km^{2})	City (New Jersey)	1905
Kenilworth	Borough	Union	8,427	7,914	+6.5%	2.147	5.56	3,925.0/sq mi (1,515.5/km^{2})		1907
Newton	Town	Sussex	8,374	7,997	+4.7%	3.360	8.70	2,492.3/sq mi (962.3/km^{2})	Faulkner Act (council–manager)	1864
Upper Saddle River	Borough	Bergen	8,353	8,208	+1.8%	5.253	13.61	1,590.1/sq mi (614.0/km^{2})		1894
Runnemede	Borough	Camden	8,324	8,468	−1.7%	2.051	5.31	4,058.5/sq mi (1,567.0/km^{2})		1926
Bedminster	Township	Somerset	8,272	8,165	+1.3%	26.123	67.66	316.7/sq mi (122.3/km^{2})		1798
Oradell	Borough	Bergen	8,244	7,978	+3.3%	2.411	6.24	3,419.3/sq mi (1,320.2/km^{2})		1894 (Note: As Delford Borough. Renamed Oradell in 1920.)
Spotswood	Borough	Middlesex	8,163	8,257	−1.1%	2.307	5.98	3,538.4/sq mi (1,366.2/km^{2})		1908
Hardyston	Township	Sussex	8,125	8,213	−1.1%	31.985	82.84	254.0/sq mi (98.1/km^{2})	Special charter (New Jersey)	1798
Plumsted	Township	Ocean	8,072	8,421	−4.1%	39.137	101.36	206.2/sq mi (79.6/km^{2})		1845
Butler	Borough	Morris	8,047	7,539	+6.7%	2.034	5.27	3,956.2/sq mi (1,527.5/km^{2})		1901
Byram Township	Township	Sussex	8,028	8,350	−3.9%	21.531	55.77	372.9/sq mi (144.0/km^{2})	Faulkner Act (council–manager)	1798
Riverside	Township	Burlington	8,003	8,079	−0.9%	1.484	3.84	5,392.9/sq mi (2,082.2/km^{2})		1895
North Hanover Township	Township	Burlington	7,963	7,678	+3.7%	17.368	44.98	458.5/sq mi (177.0/km^{2})		1905
Bernardsville	Borough	Somerset	7,893	7,707	+2.4%	12.836	33.25	614.9/sq mi (237.4/km^{2})		1924
Fairfield	Township	Essex	7,872	7,466	+5.4%	10.128	26.23	777.3/sq mi (300.1/km^{2})	Faulkner Act (small municipality)	1798 (Note: As Caldwell Township. Renamed Fairfield in 1963.)
Raritan	Borough	Somerset	7,835	6,881	+13.9%	1.992	5.16	3,933.2/sq mi (1,518.6/km^{2})		1868 (Note: As a Town. Reincorporated as a Borough in 1948.)
Glen Ridge	Borough	Essex	7,802	7,527	+3.7%	1.275	3.30	6,119.2/sq mi (2,362.6/km^{2})		1895
Mansfield Township	Township	Warren	7,781	7,725	+0.7%	29.586	76.63	263.0/sq mi (101.5/km^{2})		1798
Bloomingdale	Borough	Passaic	7,777	7,656	+1.6%	8.801	22.79	883.6/sq mi (341.2/km^{2})		1918
Fanwood	Borough	Union	7,774	7,318	+6.2%	1.340	3.47	5,801.5/sq mi (2,240.0/km^{2})		1895
Brigantine	City	Atlantic	7,716	9,450	−18.3%	6.522	16.89	1,183.1/sq mi (456.8/km^{2})	Faulkner Act (council–manager)	1890
Chester Township	Township	Morris	7,713	7,838	−1.6%	29.132	75.45	264.8/sq mi (102.2/km^{2})	Faulkner Act (small municipality)	1799
Upper Deerfield Township	Township	Cumberland	7,645	7,660	−0.2%	31.241	80.91	244.7/sq mi (94.5/km^{2})		1922
Dunellen	Borough	Middlesex	7,637	7,227	+5.7%	1.062	2.75	7,191.1/sq mi (2,776.5/km^{2})		1887
Haddon Heights	Borough	Camden	7,495	7,473	+0.3%	1.566	4.06	4,786.1/sq mi (1,847.9/km^{2})		1904
Berlin Borough	Borough	Camden	7,489	7,588	−1.3%	3.594	9.31	2,083.8/sq mi (804.5/km^{2})		1927
Palmyra	Borough	Burlington	7,438	7,398	+0.5%	1.849	4.79	4,022.7/sq mi (1,553.2/km^{2})		1894
Rumson	Borough	Monmouth	7,343	7,122	+3.1%	5.067	13.12	1,449.2/sq mi (559.5/km^{2})		1907
Washington Borough	Borough	Warren	7,299	6,461	+13.0%	1.965	5.09	3,714.5/sq mi (1,434.2/km^{2})	Faulkner Act (council–manager)	1868
Emerson	Borough	Bergen	7,290	7,401	−1.5%	2.231	5.78	3,267.6/sq mi (1,261.6/km^{2})		1903 (Note: As Etna Borough. Renamed Emerson in 1909.)
Green Brook Township	Township	Somerset	7,281	7,203	+1.1%	4.407	11.41	1,652.1/sq mi (637.9/km^{2})		1872 (Note: As North Plainfield Township. Renamed Green Brook in 1932.)
Upper Freehold	Township	Monmouth	7,273	6,902	+5.4%	46.476	120.37	156.5/sq mi (60.4/km^{2})		1798
Wharton	Borough	Morris	7,241	6,522	+11.0%	2.072	5.37	3,494.7/sq mi (1,349.3/km^{2})		1895 (Note: As Port Oram Borough. Renamed Wharton in 1902.)
Keyport	Borough	Monmouth	7,204	7,240	−0.5%	1.381	3.58	5,216.5/sq mi (2,014.1/km^{2})		1908
Barrington	Borough	Camden	7,075	6,983	+1.3%	1.581	4.09	4,475.0/sq mi (1,727.8/km^{2})		1917
Milltown	Borough	Middlesex	7,037	6,893	+2.1%	1.554	4.02	4,528.3/sq mi (1,748.4/km^{2})		1889
Buena Vista Township	Township	Atlantic	7,033	7,570	−7.1%	41.080	106.40	171.2/sq mi (66.1/km^{2})		1867
Mountainside	Borough	Union	7,020	6,685	+5.0%	3.996	10.35	1,756.8/sq mi (678.3/km^{2})		1895
Midland Park	Borough	Bergen	7,014	7,128	−1.6%	1.571	4.07	4,464.7/sq mi (1,723.8/km^{2})		1894
Stratford	Borough	Camden	6,981	7,040	−0.8%	1.570	4.07	4,446.5/sq mi (1,716.8/km^{2})		1925
Linwood	City	Atlantic	6,971	7,092	−1.7%	3.811	9.87	1,829.2/sq mi (706.2/km^{2})	City (New Jersey)	1889 (Note: As a Borough. Reincorporated as a City in 1931.)
Allendale	Borough	Bergen	6,848	6,505	+5.3%	3.097	8.02	2,211.2/sq mi (853.7/km^{2})		1894
Tabernacle	Township	Burlington	6,776	6,949	−2.5%	49.202	127.43	137.7/sq mi (53.2/km^{2})		1901
North Caldwell	Borough	Essex	6,694	6,183	+8.3%	3.068	7.95	2,181.9/sq mi (842.4/km^{2})		1898
Rockaway Borough	Borough	Morris	6,598	6,438	+2.5%	2.074	5.37	3,181.3/sq mi (1,228.3/km^{2})		1894
Union Township	Township	Hunterdon	6,507	5,908	+10.1%	18.765	48.60	346.8/sq mi (133.9/km^{2})		1853
Washington Township	Township	Warren	6,492	6,651	−2.4%	17.961	46.52	361.4/sq mi (139.6/km^{2})		1849
Shamong	Township	Burlington	6,460	6,490	−0.5%	44.452	115.13	145.3/sq mi (56.1/km^{2})		1852
Watchung	Borough	Somerset	6,449	5,801	+11.2%	6.016	15.58	1,072.0/sq mi (413.9/km^{2})		1926
Carlstadt	Borough	Bergen	6,372	6,127	+4.0%	3.947	10.22	1,614.4/sq mi (623.3/km^{2})		1894
Prospect Park	Borough	Passaic	6,372	5,865	+8.6%	0.465	1.20	13,703.2/sq mi (5,290.8/km^{2})		1901
New Hanover Township	Township	Burlington	6,367	7,385	−13.8%	22.334	57.84	285.1/sq mi (110.1/km^{2})		1798
Roseland	Borough	Essex	6,299	5,819	+8.2%	3.618	9.37	1,741.0/sq mi (672.2/km^{2})		1908
Dennis Township	Township	Cape May	6,285	6,467	−2.8%	60.421	156.49	104.0/sq mi (40.2/km^{2})		1827
Fair Haven	Borough	Monmouth	6,269	6,121	+2.4%	1.593	4.13	3,935.3/sq mi (1,519.4/km^{2})		1912
Maurice River Township	Township	Cumberland	6,218	7,976	−22.0%	93.166	241.30	66.7/sq mi (25.8/km^{2})		1798
Paulsboro	Borough	Gloucester	6,196	6,097	+1.6%	1.924	4.98	3,220.4/sq mi (1,243.4/km^{2})		1904
Lebanon Township	Township	Hunterdon	6,195	6,588	−6.0%	31.429	81.40	197.1/sq mi (76.1/km^{2})		1798
Eastampton	Township	Burlington	6,191	6,069	+2.0%	5.730	14.84	1,080.5/sq mi (417.2/km^{2})	Faulkner Act (council–manager)	1880
Morris Plains	Borough	Morris	6,153	5,532	+11.2%	2.554	6.61	2,409.2/sq mi (930.2/km^{2})		1926
Oceanport	Borough	Monmouth	6,150	5,832	+5.5%	3.172	8.22	1,938.8/sq mi (748.6/km^{2})		1920
Little Silver	Borough	Monmouth	6,131	5,950	+3.0%	2.712	7.02	2,260.7/sq mi (872.9/km^{2})		1923
Woodcliff Lake	Borough	Bergen	6,128	5,730	+6.9%	3.376	8.74	1,815.2/sq mi (700.8/km^{2})		1894 (Note: As Woodcliff Borough. Renamed Woodcliff Lake in 1910.)
Hainesport	Township	Burlington	6,035	6,110	−1.2%	6.470	16.76	932.8/sq mi (360.1/km^{2})		1924
Mendham Township	Township	Morris	6,016	5,869	+2.5%	17.784	46.06	338.3/sq mi (130.6/km^{2})		1798
Logan Township	Township	Gloucester	6,000	6,042	−0.7%	21.928	56.79	273.6/sq mi (105.6/km^{2})	Faulkner Act (small municipality)	1877 (Note: As West Woolwich Township. Renamed Logan in 1878.)
Andover Township	Township	Sussex	5,996	6,319	−5.1%	20.044	51.91	299.1/sq mi (115.5/km^{2})		1864
Manasquan	Borough	Monmouth	5,938	5,897	+0.7%	1.380	3.57	4,302.9/sq mi (1,661.4/km^{2})		1887
Mount Arlington	Borough	Morris	5,909	5,050	+17.0%	2.140	5.54	2,761.2/sq mi (1,066.1/km^{2})		1890
Belmar	Borough	Monmouth	5,907	5,794	+2.0%	1.045	2.71	5,652.6/sq mi (2,182.5/km^{2})	Faulkner Act (small municipality)	1885 (Note: As Ocean Beach Borough. Renamed Belmar in 1890.)
Hightstown	Borough	Mercer	5,900	5,494	+7.4%	1.233	3.19	4,785.1/sq mi (1,847.5/km^{2})		1853
Old Tappan	Borough	Bergen	5,888	5,750	+2.4%	3.315	8.59	1,776.2/sq mi (685.8/km^{2})		1894
Tewksbury	Township	Hunterdon	5,870	5,993	−2.1%	31.645	81.96	185.5/sq mi (71.6/km^{2})		1798
Berlin Township	Township	Camden	5,867	5,357	+9.5%	3.342	8.66	1,755.5/sq mi (677.8/km^{2})	Faulkner Act (small municipality)	1910
Mullica Township	Township	Atlantic	5,816	6,147	−5.4%	56.375	146.01	103.2/sq mi (39.8/km^{2})		1838
Rochelle Park	Township	Bergen	5,814	5,530	+5.1%	0.991	2.57	5,866.8/sq mi (2,265.2/km^{2})		1871 (Note: As Midland Township. Renamed Rochelle Park in 1929.)
Jamesburg	Borough	Middlesex	5,783	5,915	−2.2%	0.882	2.28	6,556.7/sq mi (2,531.6/km^{2})		1887
Union Beach	Borough	Monmouth	5,723	6,245	−8.4%	1.782	4.62	3,211.6/sq mi (1,240.0/km^{2})		1925
Blairstown	Township	Warren	5,704	5,967	−4.4%	29.887	77.41	190.9/sq mi (73.7/km^{2})		1845
Norwood	Borough	Bergen	5,641	5,711	−1.2%	2.785	7.21	2,025.5/sq mi (782.0/km^{2})		1905
Somerdale	Borough	Camden	5,566	5,151	+8.1%	1.392	3.61	3,998.6/sq mi (1,543.9/km^{2})		1929
Fairfield Township	Township	Cumberland	5,546	6,295	−11.9%	41.119	106.50	134.9/sq mi (52.1/km^{2})		1798
Greenwich Township	Township	Warren	5,473	5,712	−4.2%	10.581	27.40	517.2/sq mi (199.7/km^{2})		1798
Independence Township	Township	Warren	5,469	5,662	−3.4%	19.830	51.36	275.8/sq mi (106.5/km^{2})		1798
Englewood Cliffs	Borough	Bergen	5,342	5,281	+1.2%	2.126	5.51	2,512.7/sq mi (970.2/km^{2})		1895
Clementon	Borough	Camden	5,338	5,000	+6.8%	1.893	4.90	2,819.9/sq mi (1,088.8/km^{2})		1925
Allamuchy Township	Township	Warren	5,335	4,323	+23.4%	19.992	51.78	266.9/sq mi (103.0/km^{2})	Faulkner Act (small municipality)	1873
Margate City	City	Atlantic	5,317	6,354	−16.3%	1.416	3.67	3,754.9/sq mi (1,449.8/km^{2})	Walsh Act	1885 (Note: As South Atlantic City. Renamed Margate City in 1909.)
Frankford	Township	Sussex	5,302	5,565	−4.7%	33.876	87.74	156.5/sq mi (60.4/km^{2})		1798
Salem	City	Salem	5,296	5,146	+2.9%	2.344	6.07	2,259.4/sq mi (872.4/km^{2})	City (New Jersey)	1798 (Note: As a Township. Reincorporated as a City in 1858.)
Holland Township	Township	Hunterdon	5,177	5,291	−2.2%	23.469	60.78	220.6/sq mi (85.2/km^{2})		1874
Wildwood	City	Cape May	5,157	5,325	−3.2%	1.541	3.99	3,346.5/sq mi (1,292.1/km^{2})	Walsh Act	1895 (Note: As a Borough. Reincorporated as a City in 1912.)
Brielle	Borough	Monmouth	4,982	4,774	+4.4%	1.756	4.55	2,837.1/sq mi (1,095.4/km^{2})		1919
Demarest	Borough	Bergen	4,981	4,881	+2.0%	2.072	5.37	2,404.0/sq mi (928.2/km^{2})		1903
Mendham Borough	Borough	Morris	4,981	4,981	0.0%	5.931	15.36	839.8/sq mi (324.3/km^{2})		1906
Greenwich Township	Township	Gloucester	4,917	4,899	+0.4%	8.982	23.26	547.4/sq mi (211.4/km^{2})	Faulkner Act (small municipality)	1798
Franklin Borough	Borough	Sussex	4,912	5,045	−2.6%	4.356	11.28	1,127.6/sq mi (435.4/km^{2})		1913
Hampton Township	Township	Sussex	4,893	5,196	−5.8%	24.570	63.64	199.1/sq mi (76.9/km^{2})		1864
Spring Lake Heights	Borough	Monmouth	4,890	4,713	+3.8%	1.295	3.35	3,776.1/sq mi (1,457.9/km^{2})		1927
Flemington	Borough	Hunterdon	4,876	4,581	+6.4%	1.077	2.79	4,527.4/sq mi (1,748.0/km^{2})		1910
South Bound Brook	Borough	Somerset	4,863	4,563	+6.6%	0.645	1.67	7,539.5/sq mi (2,911.0/km^{2})		1907
Penns Grove	Borough	Salem	4,837	5,147	−6.0%	0.893	2.31	5,416.6/sq mi (2,091.4/km^{2})		1894
Delanco	Township	Burlington	4,824	4,283	+12.6%	2.358	6.11	2,045.8/sq mi (789.9/km^{2})		1859 (Note: As Beverly Township. Renamed Delanco in 1926.)
Alexandria	Township	Hunterdon	4,809	4,938	−2.6%	27.534	71.31	174.7/sq mi (67.4/km^{2})		1798
Point Pleasant Beach	Borough	Ocean	4,766	4,665	+2.2%	1.424	3.69	3,346.9/sq mi (1,292.2/km^{2})		1886
Northvale	Borough	Bergen	4,761	4,640	+2.6%	1.265	3.28	3,763.6/sq mi (1,453.1/km^{2})		1916
Harrington Park	Borough	Bergen	4,741	4,664	+1.7%	1.846	4.78	2,568.3/sq mi (991.6/km^{2})		1904
Commercial Township	Township	Cumberland	4,669	5,178	−9.8%	31.914	82.66	146.3/sq mi (56.5/km^{2})		1874
Mount Ephraim	Borough	Camden	4,651	4,676	−0.5%	0.884	2.29	5,261.3/sq mi (2,031.4/km^{2})	Walsh Act	1926
Neptune City	Borough	Monmouth	4,626	4,869	−5.0%	0.896	2.32	5,162.9/sq mi (1,993.4/km^{2})		1881
Highlands	Borough	Monmouth	4,621	5,005	−7.7%	0.740	1.92	6,244.6/sq mi (2,411.1/km^{2})	Faulkner Act (small municipality)	1900
White	Township	Warren	4,606	4,882	−5.7%	27.366	70.88	168.3/sq mi (65.0/km^{2})		1913
Delaware Township	Township	Hunterdon	4,560	4,563	−0.1%	36.656	94.94	124.4/sq mi (48.0/km^{2})		1838
Buena	Borough	Atlantic	4,501	4,603	−2.2%	7.573	19.61	594.3/sq mi (229.5/km^{2})		1948
Mountain Lakes	Borough	Morris	4,472	4,160	+7.5%	2.641	6.84	1,693.3/sq mi (653.8/km^{2})		1924
Garwood	Borough	Union	4,454	4,226	+5.4%	0.650	1.68	6,852.3/sq mi (2,645.7/km^{2})		1903
Elk Township	Township	Gloucester	4,424	4,216	+4.9%	19.157	49.62	230.9/sq mi (89.2/km^{2})		1891
Atlantic Highlands	Borough	Monmouth	4,414	4,385	+0.7%	1.264	3.27	3,492.1/sq mi (1,348.3/km^{2})		1887
Egg Harbor City	City	Atlantic	4,396	4,243	+3.6%	10.851	28.10	405.1/sq mi (156.4/km^{2})	City (New Jersey)	1858
Hopewell Township	Township	Cumberland	4,391	4,571	−3.9%	29.890	77.41	146.9/sq mi (56.7/km^{2})		1798
Boonton Township	Township	Morris	4,380	4,263	+2.7%	8.131	21.06	538.7/sq mi (208.0/km^{2})		1867
Magnolia	Borough	Camden	4,352	4,341	+0.3%	0.978	2.53	4,449.9/sq mi (1,718.1/km^{2})		1915
Bradley Beach	Borough	Monmouth	4,282	4,298	−0.4%	0.610	1.58	7,019.7/sq mi (2,710.3/km^{2})	Faulkner Act (small municipality)	1893
Medford Lakes	Borough	Burlington	4,264	4,146	+2.8%	1.140	2.95	3,740.4/sq mi (1,444.2/km^{2})	1923 Municipal Manager Law	1939
Westville	Borough	Gloucester	4,264	4,288	−0.6%	1.024	2.65	4,164.1/sq mi (1,607.8/km^{2})		1914
Ho-Ho-Kus	Borough	Bergen	4,258	4,078	+4.4%	1.739	4.50	2,448.5/sq mi (945.4/km^{2})		1908
Shrewsbury Borough	Borough	Monmouth	4,184	3,809	+9.8%	2.161	5.60	1,936.1/sq mi (747.5/km^{2})		1926
Pilesgrove	Township	Salem	4,183	4,016	+4.2%	34.935	90.48	119.7/sq mi (46.2/km^{2})		1798
Lambertville	City	Hunterdon	4,139	3,906	+6.0%	1.084	2.81	3,818.3/sq mi (1,474.2/km^{2})	Faulkner Act (small municipality)	1849
Riverdale	Borough	Morris	4,107	3,559	+15.4%	2.026	5.25	2,027.1/sq mi (782.7/km^{2})		1923
Mine Hill	Township	Morris	4,015	3,651	+10.0%	2.939	7.61	1,366.1/sq mi (527.5/km^{2})		1923
Stillwater Township	Township	Sussex	4,004	4,099	−2.3%	26.924	69.73	148.7/sq mi (57.4/km^{2})		1824
Bordentown City	City	Burlington	3,993	3,924	+1.8%	0.935	2.42	4,270.6/sq mi (1,648.9/km^{2})	Walsh Act	1825 (Note: As a Borough. Reincorporated as a City in 1867.)
Oaklyn	Borough	Camden	3,930	4,038	−2.7%	0.627	1.62	6,267.9/sq mi (2,420.1/km^{2})		1905
East Amwell Township	Township	Hunterdon	3,917	4,013	−2.4%	28.455	73.70	137.7/sq mi (53.1/km^{2})		1846
Harding	Township	Morris	3,871	3,838	+0.9%	20.054	51.94	193.0/sq mi (74.5/km^{2})		1922
Cranbury	Township	Middlesex	3,842	3,857	−0.4%	13.283	34.40	289.2/sq mi (111.7/km^{2})		1872
Merchantville	Borough	Camden	3,820	3,821	0.0%	0.593	1.54	6,441.8/sq mi (2,487.2/km^{2})		1874
Kingwood	Township	Hunterdon	3,802	3,845	−1.1%	35.006	90.67	108.6/sq mi (41.9/km^{2})		1798
Montague	Township	Sussex	3,792	3,847	−1.4%	45.231	117.15	83.8/sq mi (32.4/km^{2})		1798
Bethlehem Township	Township	Hunterdon	3,745	3,979	−5.9%	20.683	53.57	181.1/sq mi (69.9/km^{2})		1798
Woodstown	Borough	Salem	3,678	3,505	+4.9%	1.575	4.08	2,335.2/sq mi (901.6/km^{2})		1882
South Toms River	Borough	Ocean	3,643	3,684	−1.1%	1.157	3.00	3,148.7/sq mi (1,215.7/km^{2})		1927
Green Township	Township	Sussex	3,627	3,601	+0.7%	16.034	41.53	226.2/sq mi (87.3/km^{2})		1824
North Wildwood	City	Cape May	3,621	4,041	−10.4%	1.725	4.47	2,099.1/sq mi (810.5/km^{2})	City (New Jersey)	1885 (Note: As Anglesea Borough. Renamed North Wildwood in 1906. Reincorporated as a City in 1917.)
Tuckerton	Borough	Ocean	3,577	3,347	+6.9%	3.362	8.71	1,064.0/sq mi (410.8/km^{2})		1901
High Bridge	Borough	Hunterdon	3,546	3,648	−2.8%	2.391	6.19	1,483.1/sq mi (572.6/km^{2})		1871 (Note: As a Township. Reincorporated as a Borough in 1898.)
Stanhope	Borough	Sussex	3,526	3,610	−2.3%	1.838	4.76	1,918.4/sq mi (740.7/km^{2})		1904
Upper Pittsgrove	Township	Salem	3,432	3,505	−2.1%	40.242	104.23	85.3/sq mi (32.9/km^{2})		1846
South Harrison Township	Township	Gloucester	3,395	3,162	+7.4%	15.895	41.17	213.6/sq mi (82.5/km^{2})		1883
Netcong	Borough	Morris	3,375	3,232	+4.4%	0.833	2.16	4,051.6/sq mi (1,564.3/km^{2})		1894
Saddle River	Borough	Bergen	3,372	3,152	+7.0%	4.916	12.73	685.9/sq mi (264.8/km^{2})		1894
Haworth	Borough	Bergen	3,343	3,382	−1.2%	1.937	5.02	1,725.9/sq mi (666.4/km^{2})		1904
Alloway Township	Township	Salem	3,283	3,467	−5.3%	33.477	86.71	98.1/sq mi (37.9/km^{2})		1767 (Note: As Upper Alloways Creek Township. Renamed Alloway in 1884.)
Franklin Township	Township	Hunterdon	3,267	3,195	+2.3%	23.035	59.66	141.8/sq mi (54.8/km^{2})		1845
Hamburg	Borough	Sussex	3,266	3,277	−0.3%	1.145	2.97	2,852.4/sq mi (1,101.3/km^{2})		1920
Springfield	Township	Burlington	3,245	3,414	−5.0%	29.512	76.44	110.0/sq mi (42.5/km^{2})	Faulkner Act (council–manager)	1798
Pohatcong	Township	Warren	3,241	3,339	−2.9%	13.370	34.63	242.4/sq mi (93.6/km^{2})	Faulkner Act (small municipality)	1882
Fredon Township	Township	Sussex	3,235	3,437	−5.9%	17.640	45.69	183.4/sq mi (70.8/km^{2})		1904
Monmouth Beach	Borough	Monmouth	3,174	3,279	−3.2%	1.042	2.70	3,046.1/sq mi (1,176.1/km^{2})	Walsh Act	1906
Long Beach Township	Township	Ocean	3,153	3,051	+3.3%	5.448	14.11	578.7/sq mi (223.5/km^{2})	Walsh Act	1899
Deerfield Township	Township	Cumberland	3,136	3,119	+0.5%	16.842	43.62	186.2/sq mi (71.9/km^{2})		1798
Moonachie	Borough	Bergen	3,133	2,708	+15.7%	1.730	4.48	1,811.0/sq mi (699.2/km^{2})		1910
Wildwood Crest	Borough	Cape May	3,101	3,270	−5.2%	1.298	3.36	2,389.1/sq mi (922.4/km^{2})	Walsh Act	1910
Woodbury Heights	Borough	Gloucester	3,098	3,055	+1.4%	1.246	3.23	2,486.4/sq mi (960.0/km^{2})		1915
Lawrence Township	Township	Cumberland	3,087	3,290	−6.2%	36.923	95.63	83.6/sq mi (32.3/km^{2})		1885
National Park	Borough	Gloucester	3,026	3,036	−0.3%	1.007	2.61	3,005.0/sq mi (1,160.2/km^{2})		1902
West Amwell Township	Township	Hunterdon	3,005	3,840	−21.7%	21.647	56.07	138.8/sq mi (53.6/km^{2})		1846
Franklin Township	Township	Warren	2,968	3,176	−6.5%	23.420	60.66	126.7/sq mi (48.9/km^{2})		1839
Lawnside	Borough	Camden	2,955	2,945	+0.3%	1.430	3.70	2,066.4/sq mi (797.9/km^{2})		1926
Woodlynne	Borough	Camden	2,902	2,978	−2.6%	0.218	0.56	13,311.9/sq mi (5,139.8/km^{2})		1901
Knowlton Township	Township	Warren	2,894	3,055	−5.3%	24.724	64.03	117.1/sq mi (45.2/km^{2})		1798
Pennington	Borough	Mercer	2,802	2,585	+8.4%	0.961	2.49	2,915.7/sq mi (1,125.8/km^{2})		1890
Spring Lake	Borough	Monmouth	2,789	2,993	−6.8%	1.332	3.45	2,093.8/sq mi (808.4/km^{2})		1892
Clinton Town	Town	Hunterdon	2,773	2,719	+2.0%	1.346	3.49	2,060.2/sq mi (795.4/km^{2})	Town (New Jersey)	1865
Cape May	City	Cape May	2,768	3,607	−23.3%	2.473	6.41	1,119.3/sq mi (432.2/km^{2})	Faulkner Act (council–manager)	1848 (Note: As Cape Island Borough. Reincorporated as a City in 1851. Renamed Cape May in 1869.)
Riverton	Borough	Burlington	2,764	2,779	−0.5%	0.662	1.71	4,175.2/sq mi (1,612.1/km^{2})		1893
Swedesboro	Borough	Gloucester	2,711	2,584	+4.9%	0.731	1.89	3,708.6/sq mi (1,431.9/km^{2})		1902
South Hackensack	Township	Bergen	2,701	2,378	+13.6%	0.717	1.86	3,767.1/sq mi (1,454.5/km^{2})		1935
Liberty	Township	Warren	2,670	2,942	−9.2%	11.667	30.22	228.9/sq mi (88.4/km^{2})		1926
Lakehurst	Borough	Ocean	2,636	2,654	−0.7%	0.895	2.32	2,945.3/sq mi (1,137.2/km^{2})		1921
Weymouth Township	Township	Atlantic	2,614	2,715	−3.7%	11.822	30.62	221.1/sq mi (85.4/km^{2})		1798
East Newark	Borough	Hudson	2,594	2,406	+7.8%	0.103	0.27	25,184.5/sq mi (9,723.8/km^{2})		1895
Quinton Township	Township	Salem	2,580	2,666	−3.2%	23.793	61.62	108.4/sq mi (41.9/km^{2})		1873
Peapack and Gladstone	Borough	Somerset	2,558	2,582	−0.9%	5.733	14.85	446.2/sq mi (172.3/km^{2})	Borough (New Jersey)	1912
Belvidere	Town	Warren	2,520	2,681	−6.0%	1.449	3.75	1,739.1/sq mi (671.5/km^{2})	Town (New Jersey)	1845
Harmony Township	Township	Warren	2,503	2,667	−6.1%	23.750	61.51	105.4/sq mi (40.7/km^{2})		1839
Beverly	City	Burlington	2,499	2,577	−3.0%	0.541	1.40	4,619.2/sq mi (1,783.5/km^{2})	City (New Jersey)	1850
Helmetta	Borough	Middlesex	2,455	2,178	+12.7%	0.828	2.14	2,965.0/sq mi (1,144.8/km^{2})		1888
Oxford Township	Township	Warren	2,444	2,514	−2.8%	5.959	15.43	410.1/sq mi (158.4/km^{2})		1798
Seaside Heights	Borough	Ocean	2,440	2,887	−15.5%	0.617	1.60	3,954.6/sq mi (1,526.9/km^{2})		1913
Lafayette Township	Township	Sussex	2,358	2,538	−7.1%	17.883	46.32	131.9/sq mi (50.9/km^{2})		1845
Englishtown	Borough	Monmouth	2,346	1,847	+27.0%	0.570	1.48	4,115.8/sq mi (1,589.1/km^{2})		1888
Alpha	Borough	Warren	2,328	2,369	−1.7%	1.681	4.35	1,384.9/sq mi (534.7/km^{2})		1911
Wenonah	Borough	Gloucester	2,283	2,278	+0.2%	0.996	2.58	2,292.2/sq mi (885.0/km^{2})		1883
Ogdensburg	Borough	Sussex	2,258	2,410	−6.3%	2.204	5.71	1,024.5/sq mi (395.6/km^{2})		1914
Essex Fells	Borough	Essex	2,244	2,113	+6.2%	1.408	3.65	1,593.8/sq mi (615.4/km^{2})		1902
Frelinghuysen Township	Township	Warren	2,199	2,230	−1.4%	23.623	61.18	93.1/sq mi (35.9/km^{2})		1848
Gibbsboro	Borough	Camden	2,189	2,274	−3.7%	2.152	5.57	1,017.2/sq mi (392.7/km^{2})		1924
Pine Beach	Borough	Ocean	2,139	2,127	+0.6%	0.636	1.65	3,363.2/sq mi (1,298.5/km^{2})		1925
Woodbine	Borough	Cape May	2,128	2,472	−13.9%	8.019	20.77	265.4/sq mi (102.5/km^{2})		1903
Sea Isle City	City	Cape May	2,104	2,114	−0.5%	2.204	5.71	954.6/sq mi (368.6/km^{2})	Walsh Act	1882
Sussex	Borough	Sussex	2,024	2,130	−5.0%	0.593	1.54	3,413.2/sq mi (1,317.8/km^{2})		1891 (Note: As Deckertown Borough. Renamed Sussex in 1902.)
Laurel Springs	Borough	Camden	1,978	1,908	+3.7%	0.451	1.17	4,385.8/sq mi (1,693.4/km^{2})		1913
Sandyston	Township	Sussex	1,977	1,998	−1.1%	41.303	106.97	47.9/sq mi (18.5/km^{2})		1798
Avon-by-the-Sea	Borough	Monmouth	1,933	1,901	+1.7%	0.426	1.10	4,537.6/sq mi (1,752.0/km^{2})	Walsh Act	1900
Ocean Gate	Borough	Ocean	1,932	2,011	−3.9%	0.450	1.17	4,293.3/sq mi (1,657.7/km^{2})		1918
Hopewell Borough	Borough	Mercer	1,918	1,922	−0.2%	0.724	1.88	2,649.2/sq mi (1,022.9/km^{2})		1891
Oldmans Township	Township	Salem	1,910	1,773	+7.7%	19.510	50.53	97.9/sq mi (37.8/km^{2})		1881
Sea Girt	Borough	Monmouth	1,866	1,828	+2.1%	1.060	2.75	1,760.4/sq mi (679.7/km^{2})		1917
Hope Township	Township	Warren	1,835	1,952	−6.0%	18.086	46.84	101.5/sq mi (39.2/km^{2})		1839
Brooklawn	Borough	Camden	1,815	1,955	−7.2%	0.488	1.26	3,719.3/sq mi (1,436.0/km^{2})		1924
Folsom	Borough	Atlantic	1,811	1,885	−3.9%	8.264	21.40	219.1/sq mi (84.6/km^{2})		1906
Lavallette	Borough	Ocean	1,787	1,875	−4.7%	0.816	2.11	2,190.0/sq mi (845.5/km^{2})		1887
Newfield	Borough	Gloucester	1,774	1,553	+14.2%	1.738	4.50	1,020.7/sq mi (394.1/km^{2})		1924
Alpine	Borough	Bergen	1,762	1,849	−4.7%	6.401	16.58	275.3/sq mi (106.3/km^{2})		1903
Allentown	Borough	Monmouth	1,734	1,828	−5.1%	0.596	1.54	2,909.4/sq mi (1,123.3/km^{2})		1889
Eagleswood Township	Township	Ocean	1,722	1,603	+7.4%	16.103	41.71	106.9/sq mi (41.3/km^{2})		1874
Lower Alloways Creek	Township	Salem	1,717	1,770	−3.0%	45.309	117.35	37.9/sq mi (14.6/km^{2})		1767
Lake Como	Borough	Monmouth	1,697	1,759	−3.5%	0.252	0.65	6,734.1/sq mi (2,600.1/km^{2})		1924 (Note: As South Belmar Borough. Renamed Lake Como in 2005.)
Glen Gardner	Borough	Hunterdon	1,682	1,704	−1.3%	1.548	4.01	1,086.6/sq mi (419.5/km^{2})		1919
Chester Borough	Borough	Morris	1,681	1,649	+1.9%	1.592	4.12	1,055.9/sq mi (407.7/km^{2})		1930
Estell Manor	City	Atlantic	1,668	1,735	−3.9%	53.387	138.27	31.2/sq mi (12.1/km^{2})	Faulkner Act (small municipality)	1925
Lebanon Borough	Borough	Hunterdon	1,665	1,358	+22.6%	0.902	2.34	1,845.9/sq mi (712.7/km^{2})		1926
Island Heights	Borough	Ocean	1,650	1,673	−1.4%	0.609	1.58	2,709.4/sq mi (1,046.1/km^{2})	Faulkner Act (small municipality)	1887
Hardwick Township	Township	Warren	1,598	1,696	−5.8%	37.525	97.19	42.6/sq mi (16.4/km^{2})		1798
Victory Gardens	Borough	Morris	1,582	1,520	+4.1%	0.145	0.38	10,910.3/sq mi (4,212.5/km^{2})		1951
Woodland Township	Township	Burlington	1,544	1,788	−13.6%	92.638	239.93	16.7/sq mi (6.4/km^{2})		1866
Chesilhurst	Borough	Camden	1,536	1,634	−6.0%	1.715	4.44	895.6/sq mi (345.8/km^{2})		1887
Farmingdale	Borough	Monmouth	1,504	1,329	+13.2%	0.520	1.35	2,892.3/sq mi (1,116.7/km^{2})		1903
Mannington Township	Township	Salem	1,475	1,806	−18.3%	33.883	87.76	43.5/sq mi (16.8/km^{2})		1798
Sea Bright	Borough	Monmouth	1,449	1,412	+2.6%	0.720	1.86	2,012.5/sq mi (777.0/km^{2})		1889
Hampton Borough	Borough	Hunterdon	1,438	1,401	+2.6%	1.505	3.90	955.5/sq mi (368.9/km^{2})		1895 (Note: As Junction Borough. Renamed Hampton in 1909.)
Seaside Park	Borough	Ocean	1,436	1,579	−9.1%	0.655	1.70	2,192.4/sq mi (846.5/km^{2})		1898
Winfield	Township	Union	1,423	1,471	−3.3%	0.181	0.47	7,861.9/sq mi (3,035.5/km^{2})		1941
Downe Township	Township	Cumberland	1,399	1,585	−11.7%	48.403	125.36	28.9/sq mi (11.2/km^{2})		1798
Pemberton Borough	Borough	Burlington	1,371	1,409	−2.7%	0.590	1.53	2,323.7/sq mi (897.2/km^{2})		1826
Frenchtown	Borough	Hunterdon	1,370	1,373	−0.2%	1.128	2.92	1,214.5/sq mi (468.9/km^{2})		1867
Bass River Township	Township	Burlington	1,355	1,443	−6.1%	75.124	194.57	18.0/sq mi (7.0/km^{2})	Walsh Act	1864
Elmer	Borough	Salem	1,347	1,395	−3.4%	0.894	2.32	1,506.7/sq mi (581.7/km^{2})		1893
Stow Creek Township	Township	Cumberland	1,312	1,431	−8.3%	18.266	47.31	71.8/sq mi (27.7/km^{2})		1798
Avalon	Borough	Cape May	1,243	1,334	−6.8%	4.270	11.06	291.1/sq mi (112.4/km^{2})		1892
Surf City	Borough	Ocean	1,243	1,205	+3.2%	0.744	1.93	1,670.7/sq mi (645.1/km^{2})		1894 (Note: As Long Beach City Borough. Renamed Surf City in 1899.)
Milford	Borough	Hunterdon	1,232	1,233	−0.1%	1.182	3.06	1,042.3/sq mi (402.4/km^{2})		1911
Port Republic	City	Atlantic	1,101	1,115	−1.3%	7.462	19.33	147.5/sq mi (57.0/km^{2})	City (New Jersey)	1905
Ship Bottom	Borough	Ocean	1,098	1,156	−5.0%	0.712	1.84	1,542.1/sq mi (595.4/km^{2})		1925 (Note: As Ship Bottom-Beach Arlington Borough. Renamed Ship Bottom in 1947.)
Shrewsbury Township	Township	Monmouth	1,076	1,141	−5.7%	0.099	0.26	10,868.7/sq mi (4,196.4/km^{2})		1798
Beach Haven	Borough	Ocean	1,027	1,170	−12.2%	0.979	2.54	1,049.0/sq mi (405.0/km^{2})	Walsh Act	1890
West Cape May	Borough	Cape May	1,010	1,024	−1.4%	1.173	3.04	861.0/sq mi (332.4/km^{2})	Walsh Act	1884
Califon	Borough	Hunterdon	1,005	1,076	−6.6%	0.959	2.48	1,048.0/sq mi (404.6/km^{2})		1918
Elsinboro	Township	Salem	1,001	1,036	−3.4%	11.931	30.90	83.9/sq mi (32.4/km^{2})		1798
Audubon Park	Borough	Camden	991	1,023	−3.1%	0.150	0.39	6,606.7/sq mi (2,550.8/km^{2})		1947
Bay Head	Borough	Ocean	930	968	−3.9%	0.585	1.52	1,589.7/sq mi (613.8/km^{2})		1886
Hi-Nella	Borough	Camden	927	870	+6.6%	0.223	0.58	4,157.0/sq mi (1,605.0/km^{2})		1929
Far Hills	Borough	Somerset	924	919	+0.5%	4.847	12.55	190.6/sq mi (73.6/km^{2})		1921
Deal	Borough	Monmouth	900	750	+20.0%	1.184	3.07	760.1/sq mi (293.5/km^{2})	Walsh Act	1898
Longport	Borough	Atlantic	893	895	−0.2%	0.395	1.02	2,260.8/sq mi (872.9/km^{2})	Walsh Act	1898
Interlaken	Borough	Monmouth	828	820	+1.0%	0.331	0.86	2,501.5/sq mi (965.8/km^{2})		1922
Roosevelt	Borough	Monmouth	808	882	−8.4%	1.940	5.02	416.5/sq mi (160.8/km^{2})		1937 (Note: As Jersey Homesteads Borough. Renamed Roosevelt in 1945.)
Stone Harbor	Borough	Cape May	796	866	−8.1%	1.420	3.68	560.6/sq mi (216.4/km^{2})		1914
Bloomsbury	Borough	Hunterdon	792	870	−9.0%	0.932	2.41	849.8/sq mi (328.1/km^{2})		1905
Branchville	Borough	Sussex	791	841	−5.9%	0.593	1.54	1,333.9/sq mi (515.0/km^{2})		1898
Greenwich Township	Township	Cumberland	771	804	−4.1%	17.772	46.03	43.4/sq mi (16.8/km^{2})		1798
Rocky Hill	Borough	Somerset	743	682	+8.9%	0.611	1.58	1,216.0/sq mi (469.5/km^{2})		1889
Wrightstown	Borough	Burlington	720	802	−10.2%	1.850	4.79	389.2/sq mi (150.3/km^{2})		1918
Washington Township	Township	Burlington	693	687	+0.9%	101.661	263.30	6.8/sq mi (2.6/km^{2})		1802
Barnegat Light	Borough	Ocean	640	574	+11.5%	0.831	2.15	770.2/sq mi (297.4/km^{2})		1904 (Note: As Barnegat City Borough. Renamed Barnegat Light in 1948.)
Andover Borough	Borough	Sussex	595	606	−1.8%	1.348	3.49	441.4/sq mi (170.4/km^{2})		1904
West Wildwood	Borough	Cape May	540	603	−10.4%	0.286	0.74	1,888.1/sq mi (729.0/km^{2})	Walsh Act	1920
Fieldsboro	Borough	Burlington	526	540	−2.6%	0.279	0.72	1,885.3/sq mi (727.9/km^{2})		1850
Stockton	Borough	Hunterdon	495	538	−8.0%	0.546	1.41	906.6/sq mi (350.0/km^{2})		1898
Allenhurst	Borough	Monmouth	472	496	−4.8%	0.250	0.65	1,888.0/sq mi (729.0/km^{2})	Walsh Act	1897
Corbin City	City	Atlantic	471	492	−4.3%	7.697	19.94	61.2/sq mi (23.6/km^{2})	City (New Jersey)	1922
Millstone Borough	Borough	Somerset	448	418	+7.2%	0.681	1.76	657.9/sq mi (254.0/km^{2})		1894
Shiloh	Borough	Cumberland	444	516	−14.0%	1.203	3.12	369.1/sq mi (142.5/km^{2})		1929
Rockleigh	Borough	Bergen	407	531	−23.4%	1.003	2.60	405.8/sq mi (156.7/km^{2})		1923
Harvey Cedars	Borough	Ocean	391	337	+16.0%	0.561	1.45	697.0/sq mi (269.1/km^{2})	Walsh Act	1894
Mantoloking	Borough	Ocean	331	296	+11.8%	0.386	1.00	857.5/sq mi (331.1/km^{2})		1911
Cape May Point	Borough	Cape May	305	291	+4.8%	0.295	0.76	1,033.9/sq mi (399.2/km^{2})	Walsh Act	1908
Loch Arbour	Village	Monmouth	224	194	+15.5%	0.087	0.23	2,574.7/sq mi (994.1/km^{2})	Walsh Act	1957
Teterboro	Borough	Bergen	61	67	−9.0%	1.107	2.87	55.1/sq mi (21.3/km^{2})	1923 Municipal Manager Law	1917
Tavistock	Borough	Camden	9	5	+80.0%	0.273	0.71	33.0/sq mi (12.7/km^{2})	Walsh Act	1921
Walpack Township	Township	Sussex	7	16	−56.2%	24.171	62.60	0.3/sq mi (0.1/km^{2})	Township (New Jersey)	1798

== See also ==
- List of census-designated places in New Jersey
- List of counties in New Jersey
