= Borough (United States) =

Administrative division at the local government level in the United States

A borough in some U.S. states is a unit of local government or other administrative division below the level of the state. The term is currently used in six states:

- A type of municipality: Connecticut, New Jersey and Pennsylvania (also formerly Michigan and Minnesota)
- A subdivision of a consolidated city, corresponding to another present or previous political subdivision: New York and Virginia
- In Alaska only, a borough is a county-equivalent.

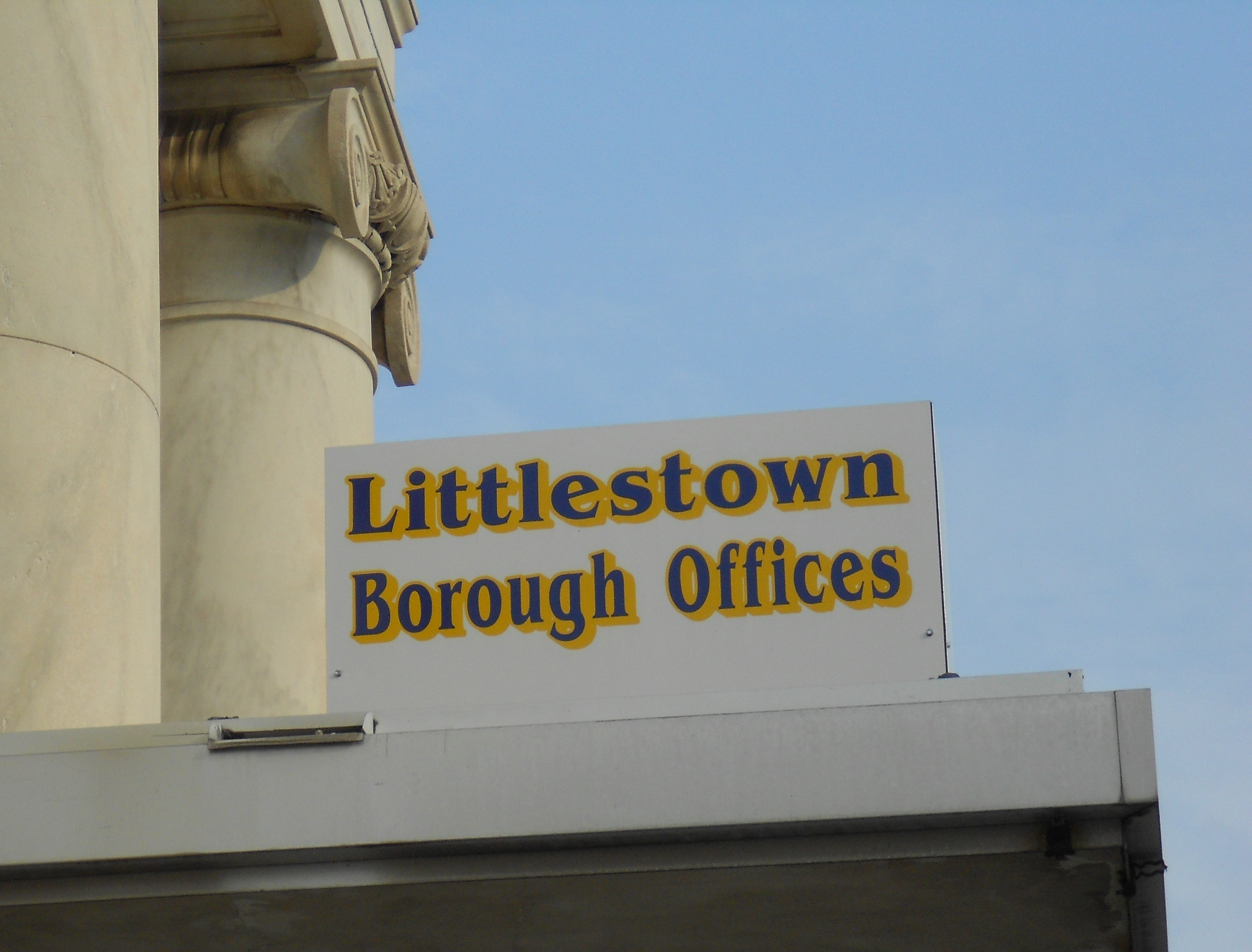
Municipal offices sign for Littlestown, a borough of Pennsylvania

== Specific states ==
=== Alaska ===
In Alaska, the word "borough" is used instead of "county". Like counties, boroughs are administrative divisions of the state.

Each borough in Alaska has a borough seat, which is the administrative center for the borough. The Municipality of Anchorage is a consolidated city-borough, as are Sitka, Juneau, Haines, Yakutat, and Skagway.

Nearly half of the state's area is part of the vast Unorganized Borough, which has no borough-level government at all. The United States Census Bureau has divided the Unorganized Borough into ten census areas for statistical purposes.

=== Connecticut ===
In addition to cities, Connecticut also has another type of dependent municipality known as a borough. Boroughs are usually the populated center of a town that decided to incorporate in order to have more responsive local government, though they can be in any part of a town; boroughs can be located in more than one town, although since 1893 all boroughs have been entirely within a single town. When a borough is formed, it is still part of and dependent on its town. There are nine boroughs in Connecticut. One borough, Naugatuck, is coextensive and consolidated with its town. The other eight boroughs, such as Woodmont, have jurisdiction over only a part of their town. Boroughs in Connecticut are counted as separate municipal governments, but governmental functions performed in other parts of the state by town governments are performed by the parent town of the borough.

=== Michigan ===
In Michigan, the term borough only applied to Mackinac Island from February 2, 1817, to March 25, 1847. The Borough government was established by William Henry Puthuff after the island was proclaimed to be a U.S. territory in the War of 1812. The borough government was replaced by a village government in 1847.

=== Minnesota ===
In Minnesota, "borough" was applied to one municipality, Belle Plaine, from 1868 to 1974.

=== New Jersey ===
In New Jersey, boroughs are independent municipalities and are one of five types of municipal government, each operating separately at the equivalent level of the other four types of municipal government available in New Jersey: Township, Town, City, and Village. Many boroughs were formed out of larger townships, but even in such cases there is no continuing link between the borough and the township. Most boroughs were formed during the Boroughitis phenomenon of the mid-1890s.

=== New York ===
New York City is divided into five boroughs: Brooklyn, Manhattan, Queens, the Bronx, and Staten Island. Each of these is coterminous with a county: Kings County, New York County, Queens County, Bronx County, and Richmond County, respectively. There are no county governments within New York City for legislative or executive purposes. The powers of the boroughs are inferior to the powers of the citywide government, but each borough elects a borough president, who in turn appoints some members of local community boards (see Government of New York City). The boroughs of New York City are generally treated as separate counties for judicial purposes and for some legal filings.

New York City does not have a city-wide district attorney's office. Instead, each borough elects a district attorney whose title is named after the respective county: Bronx County District Attorney, Kings County District Attorney, New York County District Attorney, Queens County District Attorney, and Richmond County District Attorney.

Boroughs do not exist in any other part of the state of New York.

=== Pennsylvania ===
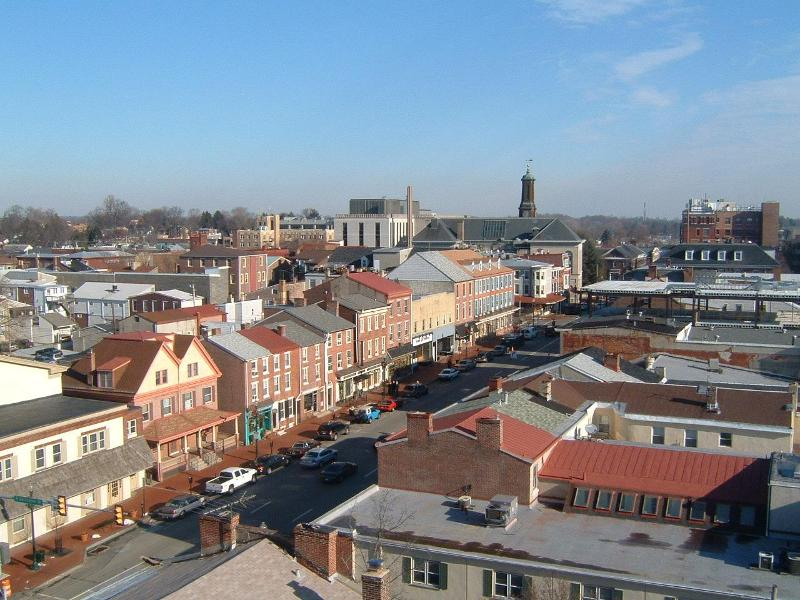
Town center of West Chester, a borough in Pennsylvania

In Pennsylvania's state laws that govern classes of municipalities, the term "borough" is used the way other states sometimes use the words "town" or "village". A borough is a self-governing entity that is generally smaller than a city. If an area is not governed by either a borough or city, then the area is governed as a township. Villages or hamlets are unincorporated and have no municipal government, other than the township in which they are found. By tradition, as recognized by publications of the state government, the only incorporated town in Pennsylvania is Bloomsburg, Pennsylvania. In August 2005, there were 961 boroughs in the state.

=== Virginia ===
In Virginia, under Code of Virginia § 15.2-3534, when multiple local governments consolidate to form a consolidated city, the consolidated city may be divided into geographical subdivisions called boroughs, which may be the same as the existing (i) cities, (ii) counties, or (iii) portions of such counties. Those boroughs are not separate local governments. For example, Chesapeake is divided into six boroughs, one corresponding to the former city of South Norfolk and one corresponding to each of the five magisterial districts of the former Norfolk County. In Virginia Beach, the seven boroughs were abolished effective July 1, 1998.

=== Wisconsin ===
Wisconsin in the 19th century occasionally used the term "borough" for the type of civil township normally known as a town.
