= Faulkner Act =

Act providing New Jersey municipal government plans

The Optional Municipal Charter Law or Faulkner Act (N.J.S.A 40:69A-1, et seq.) provides New Jersey municipalities with a variety of models of local government. This legislation is called the Faulkner Act in honor of the late Bayard H. Faulkner, former mayor of Montclair, New Jersey, U.S., and former chairman of the Commission on Municipal Government.

== Overview ==
The Faulkner Act offers four basic plans (mayor–council, council–manager, small municipality, and mayor–council–administrator) and two procedures by which the voters of a municipality can adopt one of these plans. The Act provides many choices for communities with a preference for a strong executive and professional management of municipal affairs. Twenty-one percent of the municipalities in New Jersey, including the four most populous cities (Newark, Jersey City, Paterson and Elizabeth) all govern under the provisions of the Faulkner Act. More than half of all New Jersey residents reside in municipalities with Faulkner Act charters.

In all Faulkner Act municipalities, regardless of the particular form, citizens enjoy the right of initiative and referendum, meaning that proposed ordinances can be introduced directly by the people without action by the local governing body. This right is exercised by preparing a conforming petition signed by 10% of the registered voters who turned out in the last general election in an odd-numbered year (i. the most recent General Assembly election). Once the petition is submitted, the local governing body can vote to pass the requested ordinance, and if they refuse, it is then submitted directly to the voters.

== History ==
The Faulkner Act was created to provide municipalities with greater flexibility than provided in New Jersey's traditional forms of government (city, township, borough, town and village) and to expand on the reforms provided in the Walsh Act and the 1923 Municipal Manager Law.

As originally enacted in 1950, the Faulkner Act provided for three forms of government: mayor–council, council–manager, and small municipality. Within each form, letter codes designated predefined aspects of each form and its individual arrangement of options, such as partisan or nonpartisan elections, concurrent or staggered terms, all at large or a combination of ward and at large seats.

In 1981, the Faulkner Act was significantly amended. The letter codes were eliminated, and the number of varieties within each plan was greatly increased. The council–manager plan was amended to include the option of having a mayor chosen by the electorate. A new form, mayor–council–administrator, was added. Municipalities were also given greater flexibility to amend their Faulkner Act charter without having to place the entire charter on the ballot.

== Forms of government ==
There are four forms available to municipalities through the Faulkner Act:

=== Mayor–council ===
The mayor–council form features a mayor with strong powers and a city council with five to nine members. Municipalities under this plan establish three to ten executive departments, headed by a director appointed by the mayor with the consent of the council.

This form of government provides for election of a mayor and five, seven, or nine council members. All council members may be elected at large, or some may be elected by wards; they may be partisan or nonpartisan, and serve four-year concurrent or staggered terms. There may be up to ten administrative departments. Mayors in this system are vested with broad executive power.

The following municipalities have adopted mayor–council system under the Faulkner Act:

Municipality	County
Atlantic City	Atlantic
Avalon Borough	Cape May
Bayonne City	Hudson
Berkeley Township	Ocean
Brick Township	Ocean
Bridgeton City	Cumberland
Bridgewater Township	Somerset
Burlington City	Burlington
Burlington Township	Burlington
Camden City	Camden
Cherry Hill Township	Camden
Clark Township	Union
Delran Township	Burlington
Denville Township	Morris
East Brunswick Township	Middlesex
Edison Township	Middlesex
Elizabeth City	Union
Ewing Township	Mercer
Florence Township	Burlington
Gloucester Township	Camden
Hamilton Township	Mercer
Harrison Town	Hudson
Hawthorne Borough	Passaic
Hillside Township	Union
Hoboken City	Hudson
Irvington Township	Essex
Jackson Township (switched from Township as of July 1, 2006)	Ocean
Jefferson Township	Morris
Jersey City	Hudson
Lincoln Park Borough	Morris
Little Falls Township	Passaic
Long Branch City	Monmouth
Mahwah Township	Bergen
Manchester Township	Ocean
Marlboro Township	Monmouth
Mine Hill Township	Morris
Monroe Township	Gloucester
Monroe Township	Middlesex
Morristown Town	Morris
Mount Olive Township	Morris
Mountainside Borough	Union
Mullica Township	Atlantic
Newark City	Essex
New Brunswick City	Middlesex
North Caldwell Borough	Essex
North Plainfield Borough	Somerset
Oaklyn	Camden
Ocean City	Cape May
Old Bridge Township	Middlesex
Orange City Township	Essex
Parsippany-Troy Hills Township	Morris
Passaic City	Passaic
Paterson City	Passaic
Pemberton Township	Burlington
Perth Amboy City	Middlesex
Phillipsburg Town	Warren
Plainfield City	Union
Piscataway Township	Middlesex
Rahway City	Union
River Vale Township	Bergen
Robbinsville Township (known as Washington Township until 2007)	Mercer
Rockaway Township	Morris
Saddle Brook Township	Bergen
Sea Isle City (switched from Walsh Act as of July 1, 2007)	Cape May
South Amboy City	Middlesex
Spotswood Borough	Middlesex
Tinton Falls Borough	Monmouth
Toms River Township	Ocean
Trenton City	Mercer
Vernon Township	Sussex
Vineland City	Cumberland
Washington Township	Bergen
Washington Township	Gloucester
Wayne Township	Passaic
West Orange Township	Essex
West Windsor Township	Mercer
Wildwood City	Cape May
Woodbridge Township	Middlesex

=== Council–manager ===
The council–manager plan places complete responsibility for municipal affairs in the council. The council appoints a municipal manager who is the chief executive with broad authority. While the Faulkner Act council–manager plan is quite similar to the 1923 Municipal Manager Law, it differs in the minimum number of council members to be elected (5 instead of 3), allows partisan elections, permits some council members to be elected by wards, and requires a popularly elected mayor.

The council consists of five, seven, or nine members elected either at-large or a combination of at-large and by wards for four-year terms. The mayor, who is either elected at-large or by council from among its members for a four-year term, chairs the council, but has no appointment or veto power. The council hires a manager, who serves as the chief executive and administrative official. The manager prepares the budget, appoints and removes department heads, and attends council meetings, but does not have a vote.

The following municipalities have adopted council–manager system under the Faulkner Act:

Municipality	County
Aberdeen Township	Monmouth County
Asbury Park	Monmouth County
Belleville	Essex County
Brigantine	Atlantic County
Byram Township	Sussex County
Cape May	Cape May County
Cedar Grove	Essex County
Deptford Township	Gloucester County
East Windsor Township	Mercer County
Eastampton Township	Burlington County
Evesham Township	Burlington County
Fair Lawn	Bergen County
Franklin Township	Somerset
Galloway Township	Atlantic County
Howell Township	Monmouth County
Keansburg	Monmouth County
Lawrence Township	Mercer County
Livingston	Essex County
Lower Township	Cape May County
Maple Shade Township	Burlington County
Medford Township	Burlington County
Montclair	Essex County
Moorestown Township	Burlington County
Mount Holly Township	Burlington County
Mount Laurel Township	Burlington County
Mountain Lakes	Morris County
Newton	Sussex County
Ocean Township	Monmouth County
Pequannock Township	Morris County
Randolph Township	Morris County
Red Bank Borough	Monmouth County
Ridgewood	Bergen County
Ringwood	Passaic County
Roxbury Township	Morris County
South Brunswick Township	Middlesex County
Sparta Township	Sussex County
Springfield Township	Burlington County
Teaneck	Bergen County
Verona	Essex County
Washington	Warren County
Weehawken	Hudson County
Willingboro Township	Burlington County
Skillman	Somerset County

=== Small municipality ===
The small municipality plan can be adopted by communities with a population of fewer than 12,000. All legislative powers are vested in the council with the mayor presiding over council sessions and having both voice and vote. The small municipality form is essentially a blend of the features in the traditional borough and township forms of government.

Voters select either three, five, or seven council members or a mayor and two, four, or six council members. Council members are elected at-large. Council serves three-year concurrent or staggered terms. An elected Mayor, if provided for, is elected by voters and serves a four-year term. Elections may be partisan or non-partisan. An organization meeting for the governing body is held on January 1 for partisan municipalities; July 1 for non-partisan ones.

The mayor, whether elected by voters or a council, presides over the council with voice and vote, but has no veto powers; exercises executive power of the municipality; appoints council committees; and appoints the municipal clerk, attorney, tax assessor, tax collector, and the treasurer, all with council confirmation. A Council-elected mayor serves a term of one or three years, depending on whether terms are staggered or concurrent.

The council exercises legislative power of the municipality and also approves mayor's appointees for municipal clerk, attorney, tax assessor, tax collector and treasurer.

The Mayor exercises executive power of the municipality; however council may create an administrator by ordinance.

In a July 2011 report, the Rutgers University Center for Government Studies listed 18 municipalities as operating under the Faulkner Act small municipality form of government:

- Allamuchy Township, New Jersey
- Belmar, New Jersey
- Berlin Township, New Jersey
- Bradley Beach, New Jersey
- Chester Township, New Jersey
- Clinton Township, New Jersey
- East Hanover Township, New Jersey
- Egg Harbor City, New Jersey (city website says small municipality, though source says that city form of government is used)
- Estell Manor, New Jersey
- Fairfield Township, Essex County, New Jersey
- Greenwich Township, Gloucester County, New Jersey
- Highlands, New Jersey
- Island Heights, New Jersey
- Lambertville, New Jersey
- Logan Township, New Jersey
- Lopatcong Township, New Jersey
- Pohatcong Township, New Jersey
- Stafford Township, New Jersey
- Woodland Park, New Jersey

=== Mayor–council–administrator ===
The mayor–council–administrator form is largely the borough form with the addition of an appointed professional administrator. Unlike the three other Faulkner Act plans, the mayor–council–administrator offers no optional variations in structure.

Voters elect a mayor and six council members at large for staggered terms with partisan elections. The mayor serves a four-year term; council members serve three-year terms. An organization meeting is held on January 1. The mayor is the chief executive of the municipality, and appoints the positions of municipal clerk, administrator, attorney, tax collector, treasurer and other department heads with approval by the council. The mayor can also dismiss these department heads upon written notice to the council. The mayor also has veto power subject to override by 2/3 of council members, and can vote on council matters in the result of a tie vote. This form of government also includes a municipal administrator who supervises the departments.

The following municipalities have adopted the mayor–council–administrator form of government under the Faulkner Act:

Municipality	County	Note
Berkeley Heights	Union County	Effective January 1, 2007
North Brunswick Township	Middlesex County	
West Milford Township	Passaic County	Effective January 1, 2004

== Change in form ==
A Charter Study Commission is one of two options available to residents of New Jersey to pursue a change in their form of government. The other option is a direct petition. The charter study commission approach is only available under the Faulkner Act.

A charter study commission can be elected, most often when residents are dissatisfied with the existing form of government, but there is no agreement as to what new form should be implemented.

A ballot question to form a charter study commission can be performed through a petition or by the existing municipal governing body enacting an ordinance to form a commission. Voters simultaneously vote yes / no to form a commission and also vote to select its members (if it passes), with the top five candidates becoming the members of the commission.

A charter study commission can recommend that the municipality change to one of the Faulkner Act forms of government, a choice that must be ratified by the voters within the municipality. The charter study commission also may recommend a Special Charter, with further action being required, but the study commission by the New Jersey Legislature to approve the recommended variant form of government.

Some municipal governments have appointed a charter study committee (in contrast to the charter study commission). A charter study committee operates on a purely advisory basis. While it may perform the same research functions as a commission, a committee cannot place its recommendations on the ballot, but must do so via the petition method.

== See also ==
- Walsh Act
- 1923 Municipal Manager Law
- List of municipalities in New Jersey
