= Mayors of Bloomfield, New Jersey =

Bloomfield, New Jersey was incorporated on March 23, 1812. It operates under a Special Charter granted under an Act of the New Jersey Legislature. The township is governed by a mayor and a six-member Township Council. The mayor and three councilmembers are elected at-large, and one member from each of three wards, with all positions chosen on a partisan basis as part of the November general election. Councilmembers are elected to three-year terms of office on a staggered basis, with the three at-large seats (and the mayoral seat) up for election together and the three ward seats coming up for election two years later. Bloomfield's charter, retains most of the characteristics of the Town form, with additional powers delegated to an administrator. The mayors are:

== Mayors ==
Jenny Mundell, 2025 - present

- Ted Gamble, 2024 (interim mayor)
- Michael J. Venezia, 2014–2024; a Democrat
- Raymond J. McCarthy, 2007–2010
- John I. Crecco, circa 1998
- John W. Kinder, 1971–1985
- Ralph Conte, 1963–1966
- Donald H. Scott, 1950–1955
- Charles H. Demarest, 1925–1932
- Frederic R. Pilch, 1920–1924
- Frederick Sadler, 1916–1919
- William Hauser, 1911–1912
- William P. Sutphen, 1907–1910
- George Fisher, 1905–1906
