= Village (New Jersey) =

Form of local government in New Jersey

A village, in the context of New Jersey local government, is one of five types and one of eleven forms of municipal government.

The Village Act of 1891 defined the form of government to consist of a five-member board of trustees to be elected to three-year staggered terms. One member serves as president, one member serves as treasurer. This act was repealed by the State Legislature in 1961.

The Village Act of 1989 changed the essence of the Village form of government, essentially eliminating it in all but name. As of January 1, 1990, every village operating under the Village Form of government had to operate according to the laws pertaining to the Township form. Essentially, the Village form of government is now identical to the Township form, except that the Township Committee and Mayor in the Township form correspond to the board of trustees and the President of the Board in the Village form.

== List of villages ==
Though there are four municipalities with the Village type of government, none of them use the traditional Village form of government. Tiny Loch Arbour was the last to do so, but in December 2011, its residents voted to change to the Walsh Act form of government with a three-member board of commissioners. Two other villages – Ridgefield Park (now with a Walsh Act form) and Ridgewood (now with a Faulkner Act Council-Manager charter) – also migrated to other, non-Village forms years earlier. South Orange is somewhat unusual, in that it operates with a six-member Board of Trustees and a Village President elected directly by voters, operating under a special charter granted by the New Jersey Legislature in 1869 that has been revised several times since, but that is largely modeled on the Village form of government.

== See also ==
- List of municipalities in New Jersey
