= Commissioner of Public Safety =

Municipal office in New Jersey

The New Jersey Commissioner of Public Safety heads one of the departments in those local governments in New Jersey that operate under the Walsh Act form of municipal governance, with oversight over the police and fire departments. This is a standalone position in Walsh Act municipalities with a five-member commission. In those commission forms with three members, this role is combined with the Commissioner of Public Affairs role into a consolidated Commissioner of Public Affairs and Public Safety.

Frank Hague, the mayor of Jersey City from 1917 to 1947, served as the city's Commissioner of Public Safety for his entire tenure.

== Other commissioners ==
Five-Member Commissions

- Commissioner of Public Affairs
- Commissioner of Public Works
- Commissioner of Parks and Public Property
- Commissioner of Revenue and Finance

Three-Member Commissions

- Commissioner of Revenue and Finance
- Commissioner of Public Works, Parks and Public Property

== See also ==
- Department of Public Safety
