= Town (New Jersey) =

Type of local government subdivision in New Jersey, United States

A town in the context of New Jersey local government refers to one of five types and one of eleven forms of municipal government. While town is often used as a shorthand to refer to a township, the two are not the same.

The Town Act of 1895 allowed any municipality or area with a population exceeding 5,000 to become a town through a petition and referendum process. Under the 1895 act, a newly incorporated town was divided into at least three wards, with two councilmen per ward serving staggered two-year terms, and one councilman at large, who also served a two-year term. The councilman at large served as chairman of the town council.

The Town Act of 1988 completely revised the town form of government and applied to all towns incorporated under the Town Act of 1895 and to those incorporated by a special charter granted by the legislature prior to 1875. Under the 1988 act, the mayor is also the councilman at large, serving a term of two years, unless increased to three years by a petition and referendum process. The council under the Town Act of 1988 consists of eight members serving staggered two-year terms with two elected from each of four wards. One councilman from each ward is up for election each year. Towns with different structures predating the 1988 act may retain those features unless changed by a petition and referendum process.

Two new provisions were added in 1991 to the statutes governing towns, First, a petition and referendum process was created whereby the voters can require that the mayor and town council be elected to four-year terms of office. The second new provision defines the election procedure in towns with wards.

The mayor in a town chairs the town council and heads the municipal government. The mayor may both vote on legislation before council and veto ordinances. A veto may be overridden by a vote of two-thirds of all the members of the council. The council may enact an ordinance to delegate all or a portion of the executive responsibilities of the town to a municipal administrator.

== List of towns ==
Fifteen New Jersey municipalities currently have a type of town, eight of which operate under the town form of government:

Municipality	County	Form
Belvidere	Warren	Town
Boonton	Morris	Town
Clinton	Hunterdon	Town
Dover Town	Morris	Town
Guttenberg	Hudson	Town
Hackettstown	Warren	Special Charter
Hammonton	Atlantic	Special Charter
Harrison	Hudson	Town
Kearny	Hudson	Town
Morristown	Morris	Faulkner Act (Mayor-Council)
Newton	Sussex	Faulkner Act (Council-Manager)
Phillipsburg	Warren	Faulkner Act (Mayor-Council)
Secaucus	Hudson	Town
West New York	Hudson	Walsh Act
Westfield	Union	Special Charter

== See also ==
- List of municipalities in New Jersey
