= Township (New Jersey) =

Administrative unit in New Jersey

A township, in the context of New Jersey local government, refers to one of five types and one of eleven forms of municipal government. As a political entity, a township in New Jersey is a full-fledged incorporated municipality, on par with any town, city, borough, or village. They collect property taxes and provide services such as maintaining roads, garbage collection, water, sewer, schools, police and fire protection. The township form of local government is used by 27% of New Jersey municipalities; however, slightly over 50% of the state's population resides within them.

Townships in New Jersey differ from townships elsewhere in the United States. In many states, townships can be an intermediate form of government between county government and municipalities that are subordinate parts of the township or unincorporated areas, with different government responsibilities allocated at each level. In New Jersey, there are no subordinate municipalities located within a township, as townships are equivalent to all other forms of local municipalities, and there are no unincorporated areas.

Municipalities in New Jersey may be classified into one of five types, of which townships are one. Townships may retain the township form of government, or adopt one of the modern forms of government, which are not restricted to a particular type of municipality. In New Jersey, a municipality's name (such as X Township) is not necessarily an indication of its form of government.

In New Jersey, the township form of government consists of a three to five-member township committee usually elected at-large in partisan elections. At its organization meeting, held after an election, the committee selects one of its elected members to serve as mayor and preside at meetings. The other members of the township committee serve as commissioners of various township departments, overseeing the work of those areas along with overall legislative issues. Some mayors in this form of government also oversee specific departments. The mayor in this form of government is primarily ceremonial and has the same power as other township committee members. The mayor does hold the powers vested in all mayors under state law. One township committee member is elected deputy mayor each year. Some towns with this form of government rotate the mayor's office each year, while others elect the same mayor for 2–3 consecutive years. Out of the 240 townships in the state, the township form of government is used by 140. On road signs, township is often abbreviated TWP or Twp. Some official documents abbreviate it as "Twsp."

== History ==
Historically, a variety of legislation has been passed by the state legislature that has defined and refined the township form of municipal government:

The Township Act of 1798 was the first state legislation to incorporate municipalities. The government defined was a form of direct democracy, similar to the New England town meeting, in which the vote was available to all white males, at least 21 years old, who were citizens of New Jersey, and residents of the township for at least six months; and who paid taxes in the township, or who owned land, or rented a home in the township for a rent of at least five dollars a year. A group of five freeholders was elected to one-year terms on the Township Committee, which was responsible to oversee the expenditure of revenue in between town meetings.

The Township Act of 1899 abolished the town meeting and strengthened the role of the Township Committee, which was initially set at three and amended to allow for expansion to five members. Members were elected for staggered three-year terms.

The Home Rule Act of 1917 legally defined the term "municipality" and recognized five types of government: borough, township, city, town, and village and granted each equal legal standing.

The Township Act of 1989 simplified the much-amended Act of 1899. It retains a three or five member township committee serving staggered terms, whose members are generally elected at-large. The committee elects a mayor from among its members to serve a one-year term. Partisan elections are allowed under this law. Voters may initiate a referendum to change the membership to consist of either 3 or 5 members. While many township committees directly supervise the operation of their municipality, the revised act allows the committee to delegate all or a portion of its responsibilities to an appointed municipal administrator.

A number of municipalities changed to the Township type, or the Township form of government, between 1979 and 1982. A federal law, The State and Local Fiscal Assistance Act of 1972 provided funding to the states to be divided between state and municipal governments. In 1981, states were removed from the program and the law was amended to provide direct grants to the most popular form of local government in the United States - townships. In Essex County alone, 11 municipal governments changed their form or name to take advantage of the program.

== List of Townships ==
There are a total of 240 townships in the state, including:

- Aberdeen Township
- Alexandria Township
- Allamuchy Township
- Alloway Township
- Andover Township
- Barnegat Township
- Bass River Township
- Bedminster
- Belleville
- Berkeley Heights
- Berkeley Township
- Berlin Township
- Bernards Township
- Bethlehem Township
- Blairstown
- Bloomfield
- Boonton Township
- Bordentown Township
- Branchburg
- Brick Township
- Bridgewater Township
- Buena Vista Township
- Burlington Township
- Byram Township
- Carneys Point Township
- Cedar Grove
- Chatham Township
- Cherry Hill Township
- Chester Township
- Chesterfield Township
- Cinnaminson Township
- Clark
- Clinton Township
- Colts Neck Township
- Commercial Township
- Cranbury
- Cranford
- Deerfield Township
- Delanco Township
- Delaware Township
- Delran Township
- Dennis Township
- Denville Township
- Deptford Township
- Downe Township
- Eagleswood Township
- East Amwell Township
- East Brunswick
- East Greenwich Township
- East Hanover Township
- East Windsor
- Eastampton Township
- Edgewater Park
- Edison
- Egg Harbor Township
- Elk Township
- Elsinboro Township
- Evesham
- Ewing Township
- Fairfield Township, Cumberland County
- Fairfield Township, Essex County
- Florence Township
- Frankford Township
- Franklin Township, Gloucester County
- Franklin Township, Hunterdon County
- Franklin Township, Somerset County
- Franklin Township, Warren County
- Fredon Township
- Freehold Township
- Frelinghuysen Township
- Galloway Township
- Gloucester Township
- Green Brook Township
- Green Township
- Greenwich Township, Cumberland County
- Greenwich Township, Gloucester County
- Greenwich Township, Warren County
- Haddon Township
- Hainesport Township
- Hamilton Township, Atlantic County
- Hamilton Township, Mercer County
- Hampton Township
- Hanover Township
- Harding Township
- Hardwick Township
- Hardyston Township
- Harmony Township
- Harrison Township
- Hazlet
- Hillsborough Township
- Hillside
- Holland Township
- Holmdel Township
- Hope Township
- Hopewell Township, Cumberland County
- Hopewell Township, Mercer County
- Howell Township
- Independence Township
- Irvington
- Jackson Township
- Jefferson
- Kingwood Township
- Knowlton Township
- Lacey Township
- Lafayette Township
- Lakewood Township
- Lawrence Township, Cumberland County
- Lawrence Township, Mercer County
- Lebanon Township
- Liberty Township
- Little Egg Harbor Township
- Little Falls
- Livingston
- Logan Township
- Long Beach Township
- Long Hill Township
- Lopatcong Township
- Lower Alloways Creek Township
- Lower Township
- Lumberton
- Lyndhurst
- Mahwah
- Manalapan Township
- Manchester Township
- Mannington Township
- Mansfield Township, Burlington County
- Mansfield Township, Warren County
- Mantua Township
- Maple Shade Township
- Maplewood
- Marlboro Township
- Maurice River Township
- Medford
- Mendham Township
- Middle Township
- Middletown Township
- Millburn
- Millstone Township
- Mine Hill Township
- Monroe Township, Gloucester County
- Monroe Township, Middlesex County
- Montague Township
- Montclair
- Montgomery Township
- Montville
- Moorestown
- Morris Township
- Mount Holly Township
- Mount Laurel
- Mount Olive Township
- Mullica Township
- Neptune Township
- New Hanover Township
- North Bergen
- North Brunswick
- North Hanover Township
- Nutley
- Ocean Township, Monmouth County
- Ocean Township, Ocean County
- Old Bridge Township
- Oldmans Township
- Orange
- Oxford Township
- Parsippany-Troy Hills
- Pemberton Township
- Pennsauken Township
- Pennsville Township
- Pequannock Township
- Pilesgrove Township
- Piscataway
- Pittsgrove Township
- Plainsboro Township
- Plumsted Township
- Pohatcong Township
- Quinton Township
- Randolph
- Raritan Township
- Readington Township
- River Vale
- Riverside Township
- Robbinsville Township
- Rochelle Park
- Rockaway Township
- Roxbury
- Saddle Brook
- Sandyston Township
- Scotch Plains
- Shamong Township
- Shrewsbury Township
- South Brunswick
- South Hackensack
- South Harrison Township
- Southampton Township
- Sparta
- Springfield Township, Burlington County
- Springfield Township, Union County
- Stafford Township
- Stillwater Township
- Stow Creek Township
- Tabernacle Township
- Teaneck
- Tewksbury Township
- Toms River
- Union Township, Hunterdon County
- Union Township, Union County
- Upper Deerfield Township
- Upper Freehold Township
- Upper Pittsgrove Township
- Upper Township
- Vernon Township
- Verona
- Voorhees Township
- Wall Township
- Walpack Township
- Wantage Township
- Warren Township
- Washington Township, Bergen County
- Washington Township, Burlington County
- Washington Township, Gloucester County
- Washington Township, Morris County
- Washington Township, Warren County
- Waterford Township
- Wayne
- Weehawken
- West Amwell Township
- West Caldwell
- West Deptford Township
- West Milford
- West Orange
- West Windsor
- Westampton
- Weymouth Township
- White Township
- Willingboro Township
- Winfield Township
- Winslow Township
- Woodbridge Township
- Woodland Township
- Woolwich Township
- Wyckoff

== See also ==
- Township
- Township (United States)
- List of municipalities in New Jersey
