= 1923 Municipal Manager Law =

New Jersey law

The 1923 Municipal Manager Law was the last type of reformed municipal government the state of New Jersey introduced in the Progressive Era. The law introduced to New Jersey the council–manager form of government first developed in Sumter, South Carolina.

The council is nonpartisan and elected at-large for four-year terms. The terms may be either concurrent or staggered, and there is an option for run-off elections. Presently, only Lodi Borough uses run-offs and staggered terms, with half of the council being elected for four-year terms every two years.

The mayor, elected by the council from its own numbers, has no executive responsibility beyond appointing representatives of commissions and boards, and presiding over council meetings. The mayor is elected for a four-year term in municipalities with concurrent terms or serves for a two-year term in Lodi Borough which has staggered terms.

The members of the council are subject to recall elections.

| Municipality | County | Terms | Council Seats |
|---|---|---|---|
| Clifton City | Passaic | Concurrent | 7 |
| Garfield City | Bergen | Concurrent | 5 |
| Hackensack City | Bergen | Concurrent | 5 |
| Lodi Borough | Bergen | Staggered | 7 |
| Medford Lakes Borough | Burlington | Staggered | 5 |
| Teterboro Borough | Bergen | Concurrent | 5 |

== See also ==
- Walsh Act (New Jersey)
- City manager
