= Walsh Act =

New Jersey local government act

Walsh Act of 1926
- Long title: An Act To provide for the summon of witnesses in foreign countries, and for other purposes.
- Enacted by: the 69th United States Congress

Citations
- Statutes at Large: 44 Stat. 835

Legislative history
- Introduced in the Senate as S. 4564 on June 28, 1926; Passed the Senate on June 30, 1926 (Voice vote); Passed the House on July 3, 1926 (Voice vote); Signed into law by President Calvin Coolidge on July 3, 1926

The Walsh Act is a piece of legislation in the U.S. state of New Jersey that permits municipalities to adopt a non-partisan commission form of government. The legislation was signed by Governor of New Jersey Woodrow Wilson on April 25, 1911. The commissions in Walsh Act municipalities are composed of either three or five members elected for four-year concurrent terms. The commissioners also serve as department heads in addition to their legislative functions. The commissioners elect one commissioner as mayor, who serves as chair of the commission. With few exceptions, Walsh Act mayors have no powers over and above their fellow commissioners, and are only responsible for their specific department(s).

The Walsh Act was modeled on the commission system that was set up in Galveston, Texas, in the wake of the devastating hurricane of 1900. As part of its reconstruction efforts, the city reorganized itself to a government system in which each elected official had a specific area of responsibility, combining executive and legislative responsibilities. The Walsh Act was enacted in 1911, and specified that commissioners would be elected at large in nonpartisan elections, and would serve four-year, concurrent terms of office. The Walsh Act was the first charter law in New Jersey to include options for ballot initiatives, referendums and recall.

The popularity of the Walsh Act form of government declined from a peak of about 60 in the early years after it was created to a total of approximately 30 statewide in 2018, of which six in North Jersey and the remainder are largely in Jersey Shore communities.

== Municipalities with a five member commission ==
These communities have five commissioners:

- Commissioner of Public Affairs
- Commissioner of Public Safety
- Commissioner of Public Works
- Commissioner of Parks and Public Property
- Commissioner of Revenue and Finance

Municipality	County	Year Adopted
Lyndhurst Township	Bergen	1913
Millville City	Cumberland	1913
North Bergen Township	Hudson	1931
Nutley Township	Essex	1912
Ridgefield Park Village	Bergen	1912
Union City	Hudson	1930
West New York Town	Hudson	1931

== Municipalities with a three member commission ==
These communities have three commissioners:

- Commissioner of Public Affairs and Public Safety
- Commissioner of Public Works, Parks and Public Property
- Commissioner of Revenue and Finance

Municipality	County	Year Adopted
Allenhurst Borough	Monmouth	1916
Audubon Borough	Camden	1921
Avon-by-the-Sea Borough	Monmouth	1919
Bass River Township	Burlington	1972
Beach Haven Borough	Ocean	1946
Bordentown City	Burlington	1913
Bradley Beach Borough	Monmouth	1915
Cape May Point Borough	Cape May	1916
Collingswood Borough	Camden	1917
Deal Borough	Monmouth	1912
Haddon Township	Camden	1950
Haddonfield Borough	Camden	1913
Harvey Cedars Borough	Ocean	1923
Long Beach Township	Ocean	1936
Longport Borough	Atlantic	1912
Margate City	Atlantic	1911
Monmouth Beach Borough	Monmouth	1929
Mount Ephraim Borough	Camden	1935
Pine Valley Borough	Camden	1942
Sea Isle City	Cape May	1913
Tavistock Borough	Camden	1928
Ventnor City	Atlantic	1968
West Cape May Borough	Cape May	1948
West Wildwood Borough	Cape May	1964
Wildwood Crest Borough	Cape May	1937

== See also ==
- 1923 Municipal Manager Law
