= Special charter (New Jersey) =

Form of municipal government

A special charter allows a New Jersey municipality to operate under a charter that differs from those of the traditional forms of government or the many options available under the Faulkner Act. Under the terms of the New Jersey State Constitution of 1947 and the Faulkner Act of 1950, a municipality may obtain a special charter form from the New Jersey Legislature, providing a unique form of governmental organization for that community.

== Municipalities ==
In a July 2011 report, the Rutgers University Center for Government Studies listed 11 municipalities as operating under a special charter:

- Bloomfield, New Jersey
- Englewood, New Jersey
- Gloucester City, New Jersey
- Hackettstown, New Jersey
- Hardyston Township, New Jersey
- Middletown Township, New Jersey
- Montville, New Jersey
- Plainfield, New Jersey
- South Orange, New Jersey
- Tenafly, New Jersey
- Westfield, New Jersey

Other municipalities include:

- Boonton, New Jersey
- Summit, New Jersey
