= Smithville, New Jersey =

Smithville, New Jersey may refer to:

- Smithville, Atlantic County, New Jersey
- Smithville, Burlington County, New Jersey
