= Charles Chickering =

Charles Chickering may refer to:

- Charles A. Chickering (1843–1900), U.S. Representative from New York
- Charles R. Chickering (1891–1970), artist and postage stamp designer
