= U.S. space exploration history on U.S. stamps =

Overview of ventures beyond Earth as depicted for ease of American postage

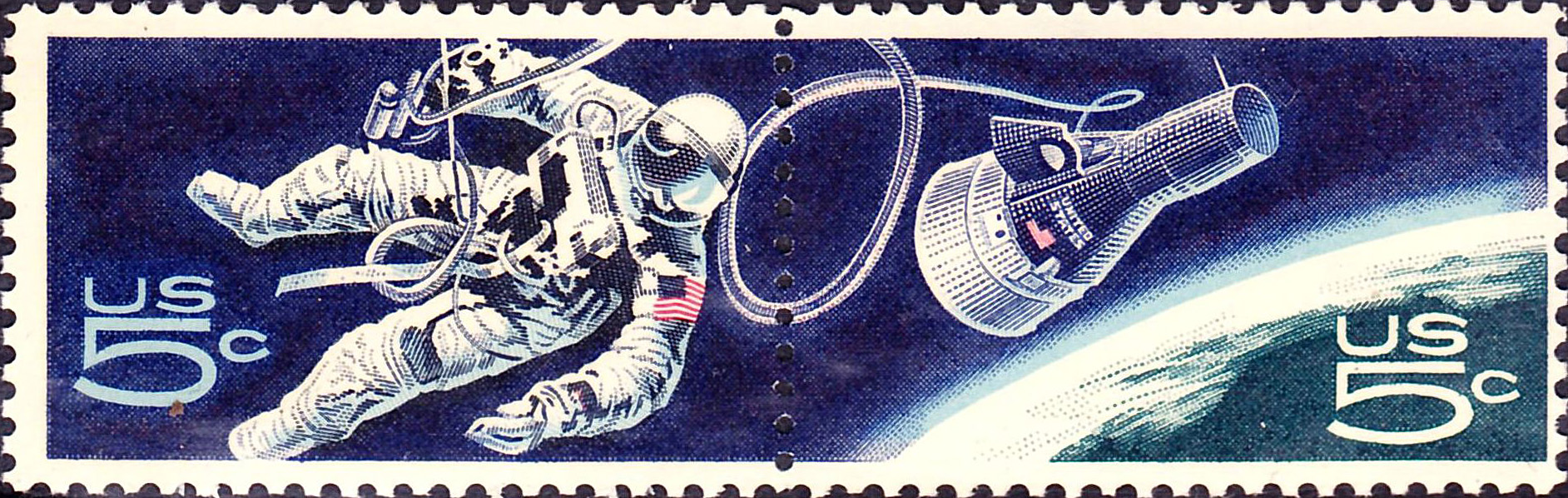
Accomplishments in Space Commemorative Issue of 1967

The advent of robotic and human spaceflight presented a new era of American history. Keeping with the tradition of honoring the country's history on U.S. postage stamps, the U.S. Post Office began commemorating the various events with its commemorative postage stamp issues. The first U.S. Postage issue to depict a U.S. space vehicle was issued in 1948, the Fort Bliss issue. The first issue to commemorate a space project by name was the ECHO I communications satellite commemorative issue of 1960. Next was the Project Mercury issue of 1962. As U.S. space exploration progressed a variety of other commemorative issues followed, many of which bear accurate depictions of satellites, space capsules, Apollo Lunar Modules, space suits, and other items of interest.

The history of space exploration is a nationally popular topic, as evidenced by record numbers of First-Day covers for postage stamps with space themes. The Project Mercury issue of 1962 had more than three million 'First Day of Issue' cancellations, while the average number of First-Day cancels for other commemorative issues at that time was around half a million. In 1969, the Apollo VIII issue received 900,000 First-Day cancels while others received less than half this amount. As the advent of U.S. space exploration grew, so did the topic of space exploration on stamps.

== Fort Bliss 100th Anniversary Issue of 1948 ==
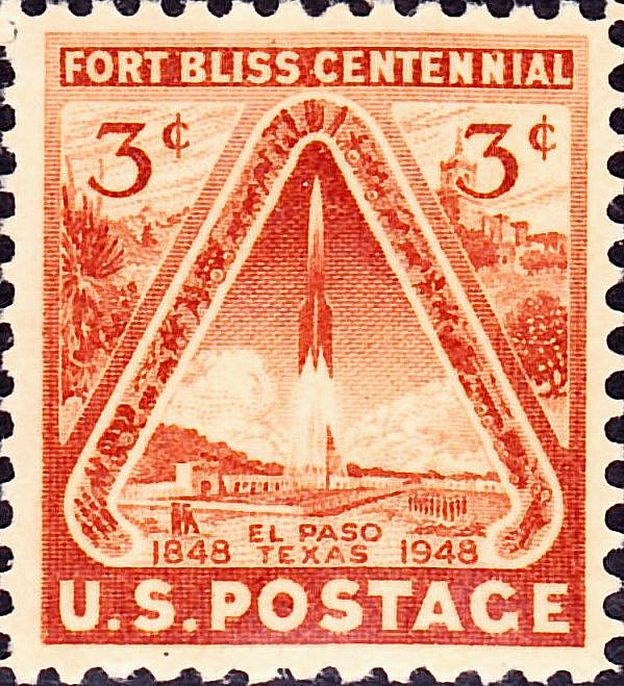
Fort Bliss Issue of 1948

Fort Bliss has a long and diverse history and functioned in many capacities over the years. By February 1946, over 100 Operation Paperclip scientists had arrived from Nazi Germany to develop rockets and were attached to the Office of the Chief of Ordnance Corps, Research and Development Service, Suboffice (Rocket), headed by Major James P. Hamill.

This stamp was issued on the 100th anniversary of Fort Bliss in El Paso, Texas, in its honor. Third Assistant Postmaster General Joseph L. Lawler dedicated the stamp in El Paso on November 5, 1948. The issue depicts what appears to be a rocket designed after the V-2 in the center, which technically makes it a "space stamp" in the Topographical world of philately.

Based on findings made by Dr. Robert Goddard following World War I, the Germans hit a peak production of V-2's during 1944 and 1945 at Peenemunde. When they arrived in the United States, at Fort Bliss, they brought with them the knowledge of the V-2, and as such, the U.S. made arrangements with these scientists and employed their knowledge in developing rockets at Fort Bliss in Post War United States. It was this effort that led the way to the successful production of the great rockets that carried satellites and Astronauts into space.

The stamp's designer, Charles R. Chickering, intended the issue to salute the old as well as the new Fort Bliss and portray some of the highlights of the Fort's hundred-year history. Chickering, of the Bureau of Engraving and Printing, designed the stamp. C.A. Brooks engraved the vignette, and A.W. Christensen engraved the border, the lettering, and the numerals. The quantity issued was 64,561,000.

== Project ECHO I, Issue of 1960 ==
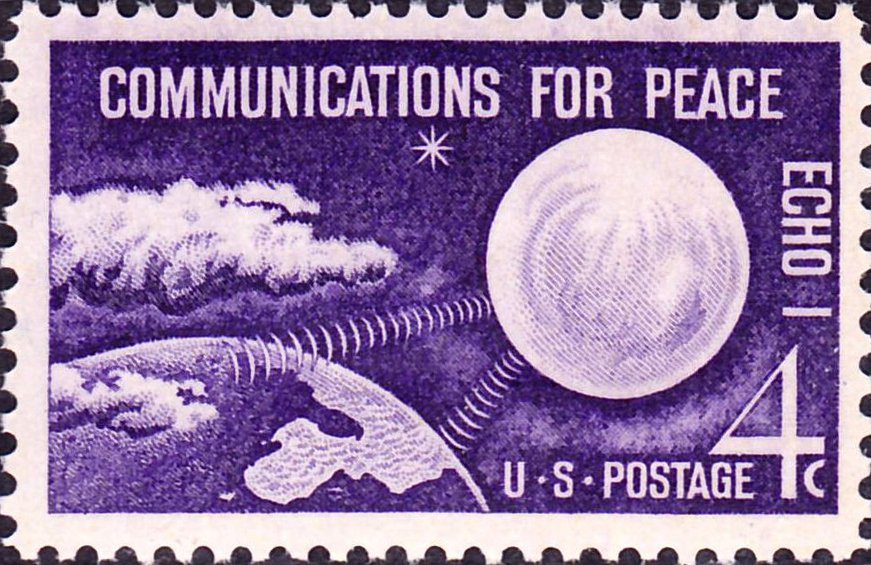
ECHO I, Issue of 1960

Following the failure of the Delta rocket carrying Echo 1 on May 13, 1960, Echo 1A (commonly referred to as just Echo 1) was successfully put into a 944 to 1,048 mi orbit on August 12, 1960, by NASA. The 100 ft. diameter balloon was made of ultra thin (0.0050 in) metalized Mylar polyester film and was successfully used to reflect transcontinental and intercontinental telephone, radio, and television signals. The satellite also aided in the calculation of atmospheric density and solar pressure due to its large area-to-mass ratio.

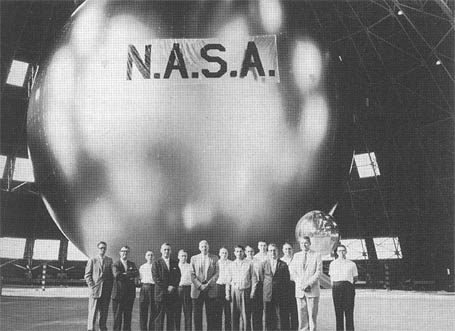
Echo 1 sits fully inflated at a Navy hangar in Weeksville, North Carolina

Because its shiny surface the large balloon-like satellite was also reflective of visible light rays, Echo 1A was visible to the naked eye over most of the Earth. Echo 1 was a passive communications satellite: it functioned as a reflector, not a transmitter. After it was placed in a low Earth orbit (LEO), a signal would be transmitted from Earth to the Echo satellite and then reflected or bounced off its surface, and then returned to Earth. It was the pioneer of communications satellites. Because it was brighter than most stars, it was seen by more people than any other man-made object in space at that time. Upon reentry into Earth's atmosphere ECHO 1A burned up on May 24, 1968.

This was the first 'Space Stamp' with an actual subject of a real space vessel, unlike the generic or symbolic rocket depicted in the Fort Bliss issue of 1948. The U.S. Post Office issued this 4-cent Echo I "Communications for Peace" commemorative stamp through the Washington, D.C., post office on December 15, 1960. The stamp was produced and issued to honor the world's first communications satellite. Designed by Ervine Metzl, the stamp was printed by the rotary process, electric-eye perforated, and issued in panes of fifty stamps each. Quantities issued totaled more than 120 million.

== Project Mercury Issue of 1962 ==
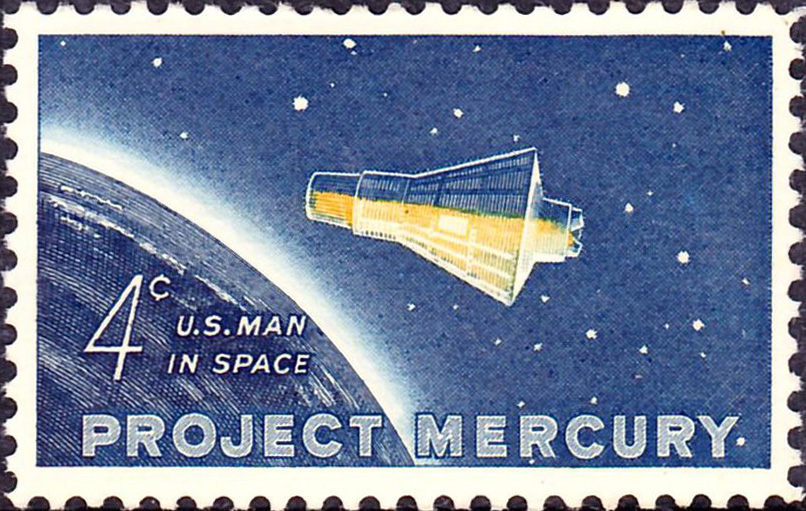
Project Mercury Issue of 1962

Project Mercury was the first human spaceflight program of the United States. It ran from 1959 through 1963 with the goal of putting a human in orbit around the Earth. The Mercury-Atlas 6 flight on February 20, 1962, was the first Mercury flight to achieve this goal.

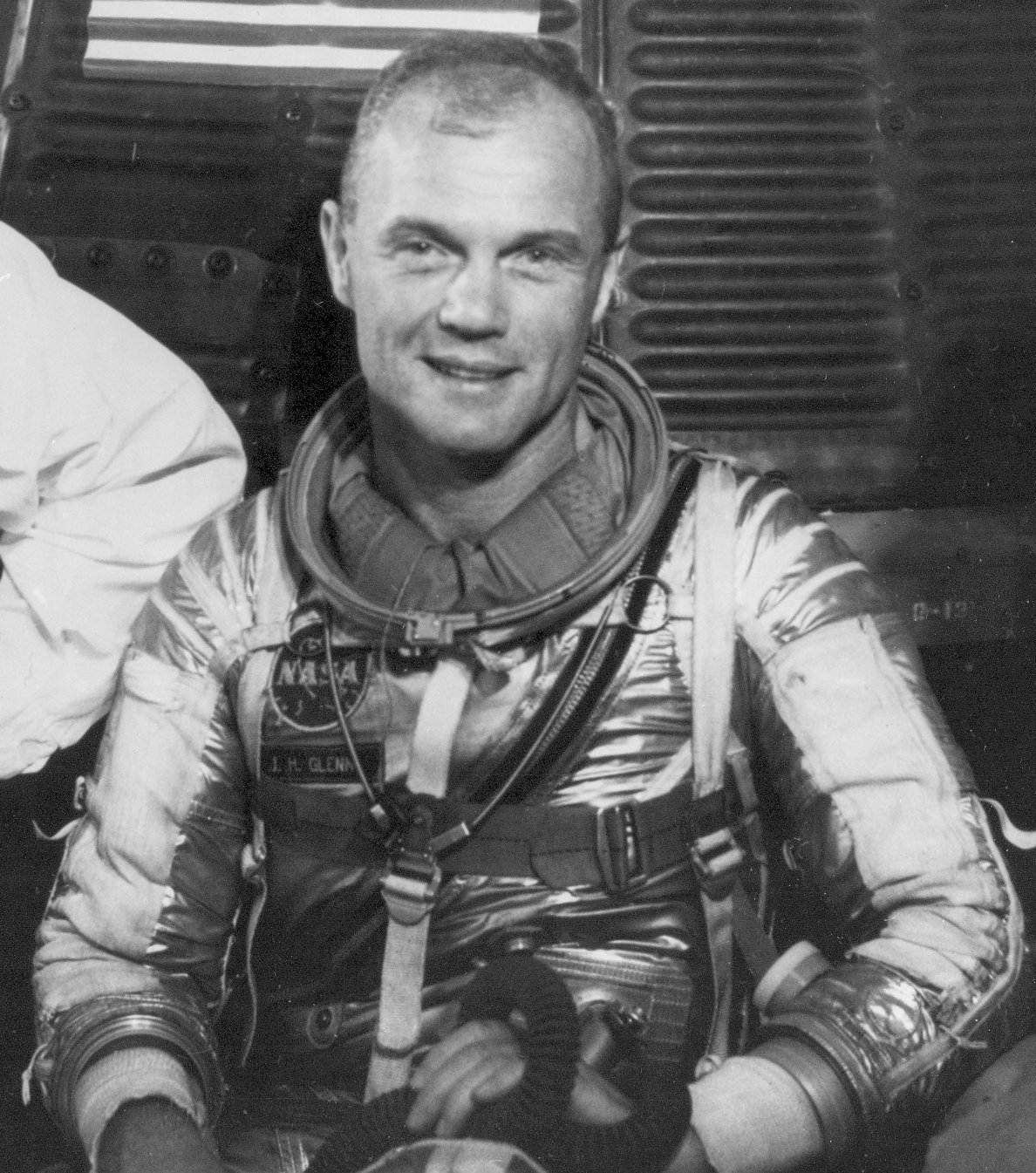
John Glenn

The Post Office Department honored this first orbital flight of a United States astronaut on February 20, 1962, when it released the Project Mercury commemorative stamp, placed on sale throughout the country at the exact hour Colonel John Glenn's historic flight officially had returned to Earth safely.

The 4-cent stamp features an image of the Mercury Friendship 7 capsule circling the Earth, against a field of stars. The spacecraft is now housed at the National Air and Space Museum, Washington, DC. Because the event was deemed so popular the number of quantities issued totaled more than 289 million, more than twice the average amount of quantities issued for commemorative postage issues of that time.

This issue has somewhat of an unusual history. It was one of the first issues printed on the new Giori Press (named after its inventor, Gualtiero Giori). It employed a series of specially cut rubber rollers that applied two or three different colored inks on the same printing plate. As the new press was being used to print the Project Mercury stamp before the mission took place and in case the mission failed or was canceled, the Bureau of Engraving and Printing kept word about the new press and the stamp issue's production a secret. To further assure that the project be kept secret the designer of this issue, Charles R. Chickering, worked from his home and simply claimed that he was away on vacation. The stamps, waiting at post offices around the U.S., were sealed and marked "Top Secret". Only after Glenn's trip were the postmasters allowed to open the package and see what was inside.

== Robert H. Goddard Issue of 1964 ==
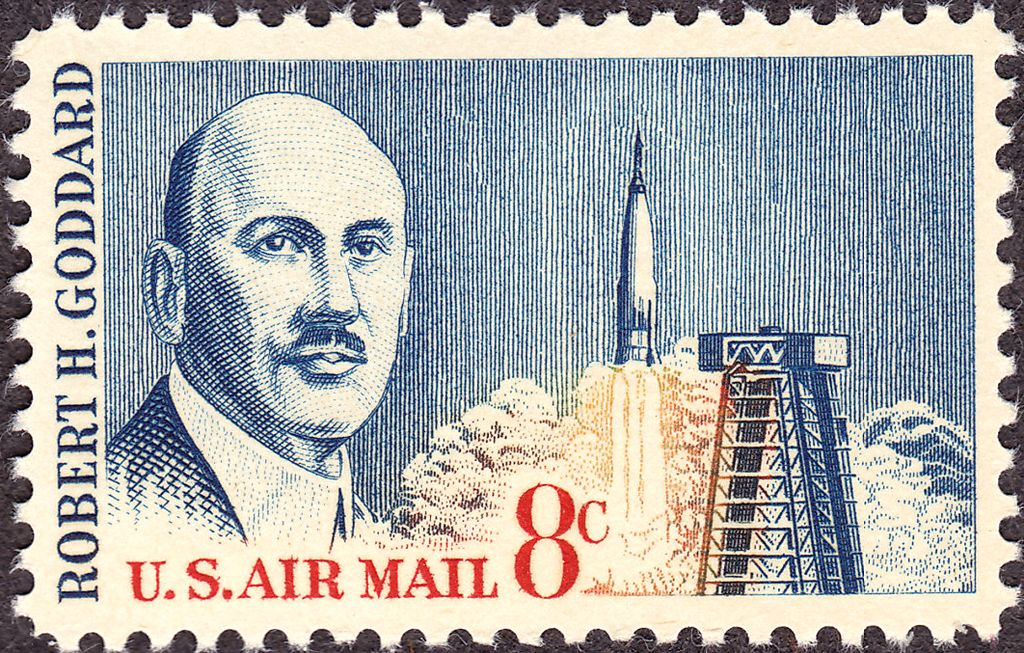
Robert Goddard Issue of 1964

Robert Hutchings Goddard (October 5, 1882 – August 10, 1945) is widely recognized as the "father of rocketry," as he pioneered the modern propulsion rocket based on his knowledge of math, engineering and physics. His accomplishments included creating the first rocket propelled using liquid fuel and developing the first rocket to use internal vanes for guidance. He launched his first rocket in March 1926. Goddard continued to achieve many firsts in the field of rocketry with funding from institutions such as the Smithsonian. In 1919, the Smithsonian Institution published Robert Goddard's groundbreaking work, A Method of Reaching Extreme Altitudes. Other than from sources like the Smithsonian, Goddard received little public support for his research during his lifetime. He was the first to recognize the scientific potential of liquid fuel rockets in space travel and was instrumental in bringing about the design and construction of those rockets needed to implement those ideas.

Though his work in the field was revolutionary, he was sometimes ridiculed by the public and in the press for his theories concerning spaceflight and therefore became protective of his privacy and his research work. Years after his death, as crewed spaceflight finally became a reality, Goddard at long last came to be recognized as the man who pioneered modern rocketry and ultimately space exploration.

On October 5, 1964, the U.S. Post Office issued a postage stamp commemorating Robert Goddard. The stamp depicts an image of Goddard next to a rocket launching from the Kennedy Space Center. The Post Office released the stamp issues at a ceremony held in New Mexico. Goddard's wife, Esther Goddard, attended the ceremony. She was given the honor of pressing the button launching two rockets, one of which flew some mile and a half into the air. The two rockets each carried 1,000 first day covers, and after parachuting to the ground were recovered with the first day covers later sold to collectors. Designed by Robert J. Jones and printed on the Giori press, the quantities for this issue totaled more than 62 million.

== Accomplishments in Space Commemorative Issue of 1967 ==
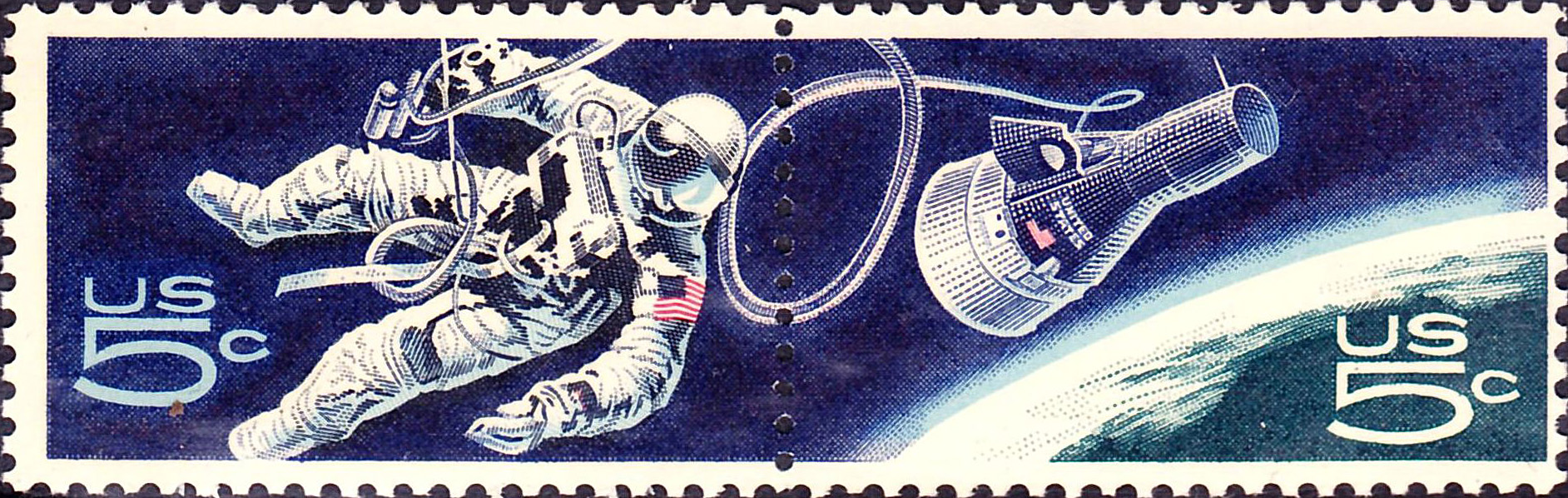
Accomplishments in Space Commemorative Issue of 1967

Gemini IV was a June 1965 crewed space flight in NASA's Gemini program. It was the second crewed Gemini flight, the tenth crewed American flight and the 18th spaceflight of all time (includes X-15 flights over 100 kilometres (62 mi)). It was crewed by James McDivitt and Ed White.

The highlight of the mission was the first space walk by an American, during which White remained tethered outside the spacecraft for 22 minutes. Tied to a tether, White fired his oxygen-powered "zip gun" and floated out of the capsule. He traveled fifteen feet (five meters) out, and began to experiment with maneuvering. He found it easy, especially the pitch and yaw, although he thought the roll would use too much fuel.

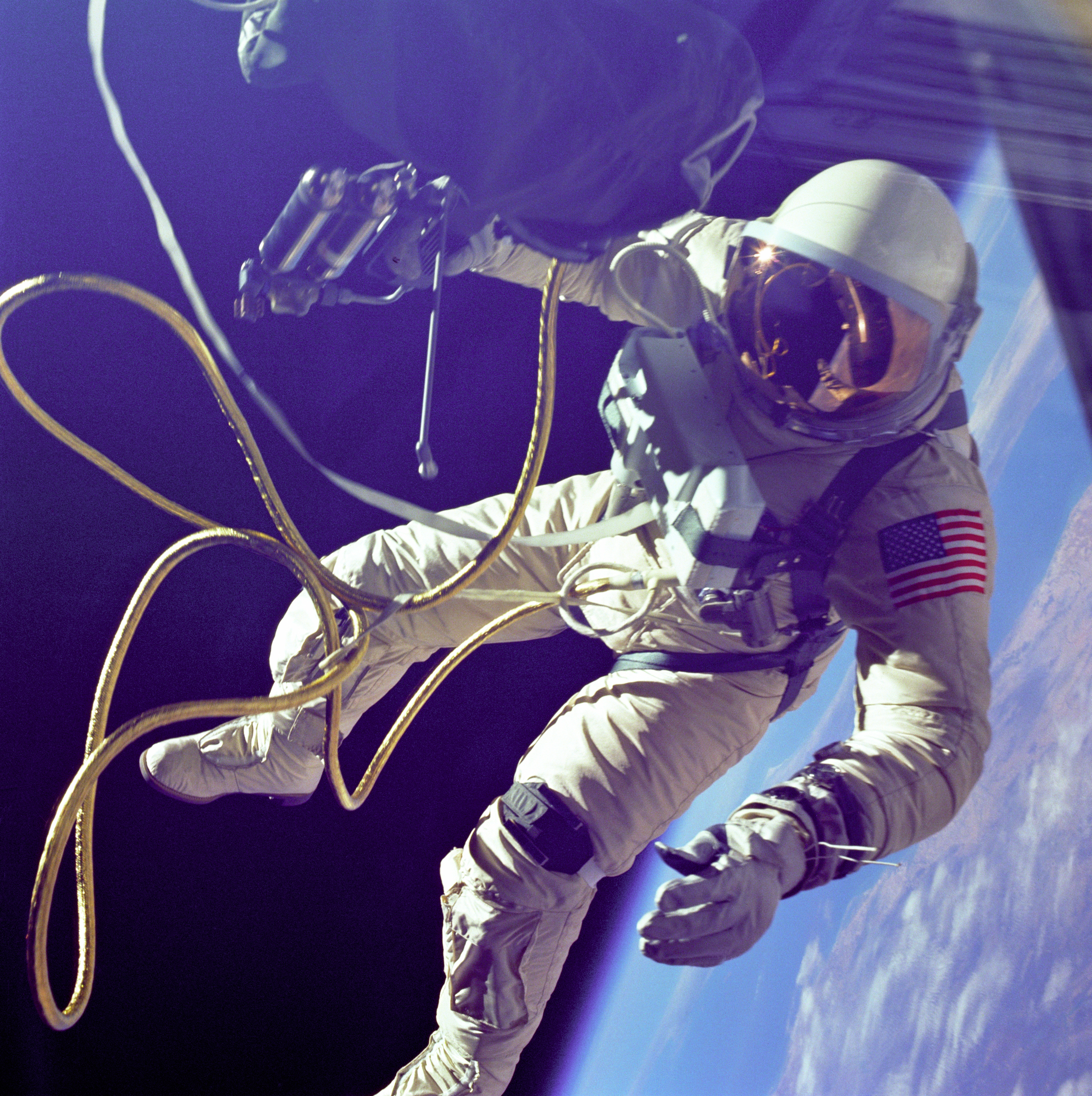
Ed White, first American astronaut to perform a spacewalk.

Two 5-cent se-tenant stamps comprise one illustration of an astronaut during a spacewalk, honoring the space accomplishments of the United States. These issues were first placed on sale on September 29, 1967, at Kennedy Space Center in Florida.

The offset press and intaglio press were combined to produce this issue in sheets bearing one horizontal plate number. Offset printed the red stripes in the flags on the astronaut's spacesuit and capsule and light blue sky areas, as well as the inscription on the astronaut stamp. The Giori press printed dark blue sky areas, the aqua earth, and black tones on the capsule and astronaut. The inscription on the spaceship stamp was white.

This issue was designed by Paul Calle of Stamford, Connecticut, who based his design from photos taken on the Gemini IV mission. The issue was printed by the Bureau of Engraving and Printing. It was issued in panes of fifty, with an initial printing of 120 million.

== Apollo 8 Issue of 1969 ==
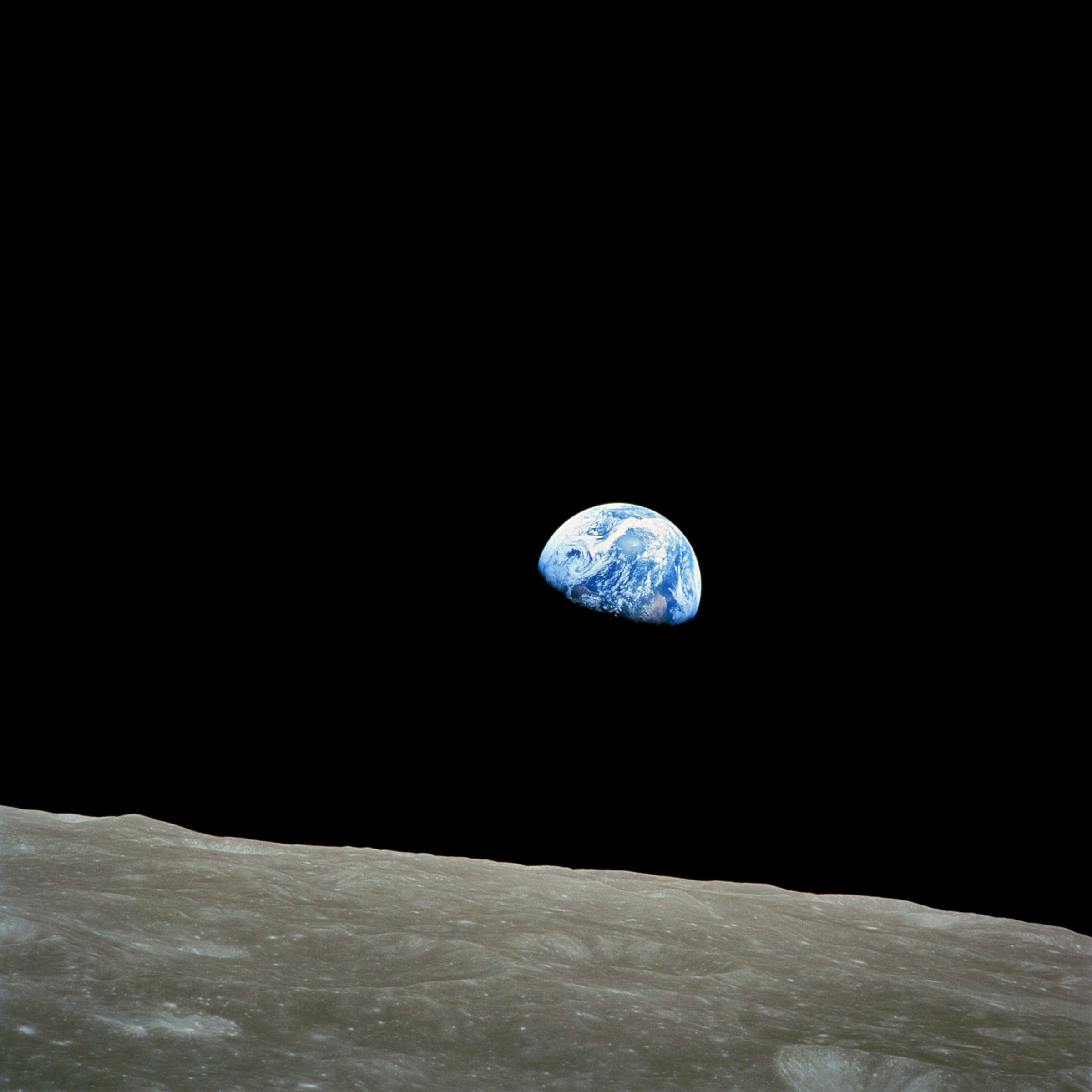
Earthrise, taken by Apollo 8 astronaut William Anders on 24 December 1968

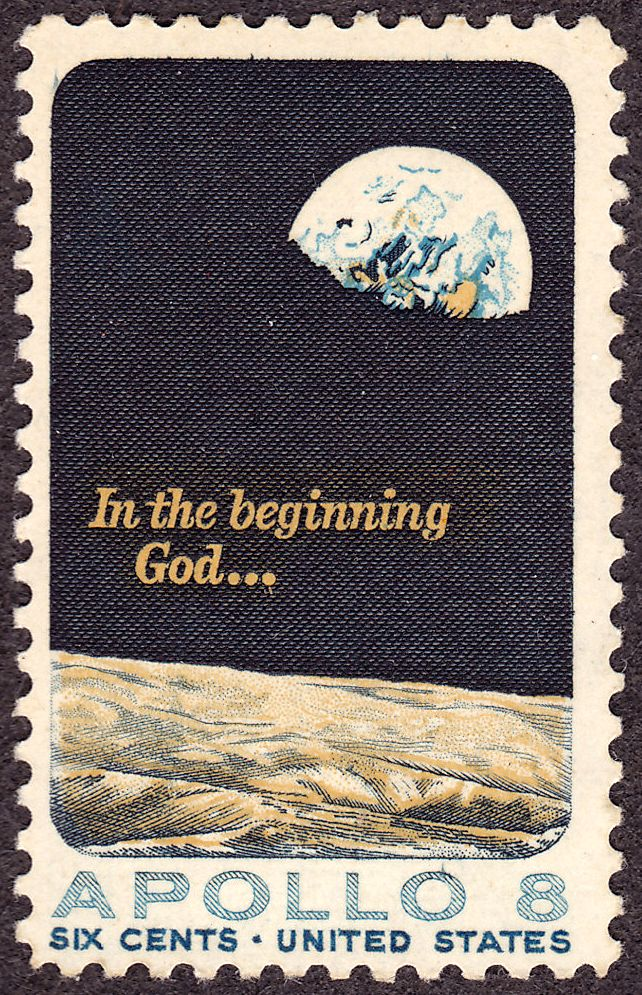
Earthrise used on the Apollo 8 1969 Issue

Up until the time of the Apollo 8 mission, all crewed ventures into space were confined to brief flights into space or to orbiting the Earth. Apollo 8 was the first human spaceflight mission to leave Earth orbit; the first to be captured by and escape from the gravitational field of another celestial body; and the first crew to voyage and then return to planet Earth from another celestial body – Earth's Moon. The three-man crew of mission Commander Frank Borman, Command Module Pilot James Lovell, and Lunar Module Pilot William Anders became the first humans to see the far side of the Moon with their own eyes, as well as the first humans to see planet Earth from beyond low Earth orbit.

The mission was accomplished with the first crewed launch of a Saturn V rocket. Apollo 8 was the second crewed mission of the Apollo Program. While orbiting the Moon each man on board read a section from the Biblical creation story (verses 1–10) from the Book of Genesis, and it is this unprecedented historical event that is theme of the Apollo VIII issue's design, the issue being inscribed with the words, In the beginning God... superimposed on the photograph Earthrise, taken by Anders. Borman finished the broadcast by wishing a Merry Christmas to everyone on Earth.

This issue was first released in Houston Texas on May 5, 1969. Basing his design on the Anders' Earthrise photograph, and from the words they read from Genesis, Leonard E. Buckley designed the Apollo 8 commemorative issue of 1969. The issue was printed on the multi-color Giori Press. Quantities issued totaled more than 187 million.

== First Man on the Moon Commemorative Issue of 1969 ==
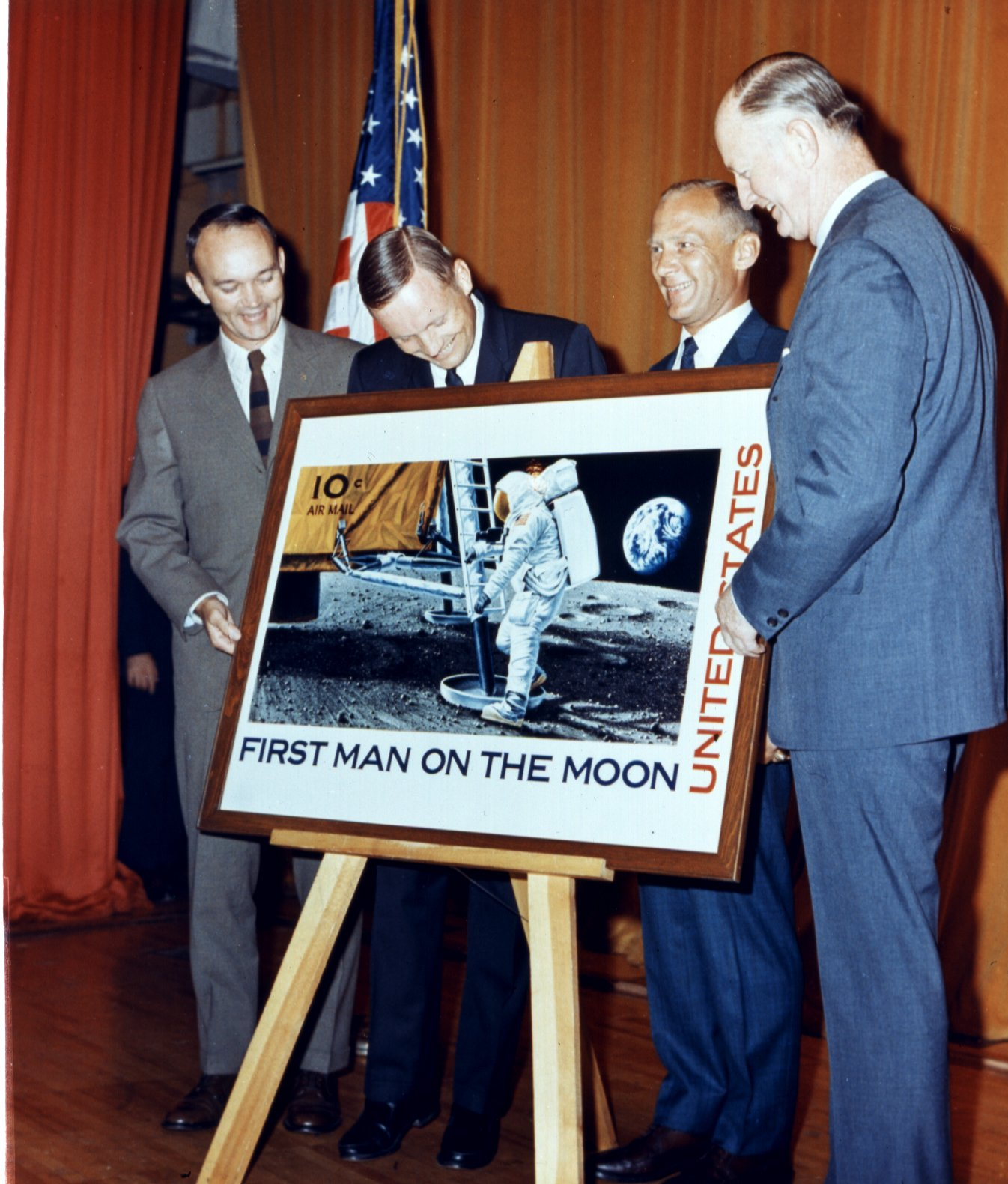
Apollo 11 astronauts unveiling First Man on the Moon stamp with U.S. Postmaster General Winton M. Blount

The Apollo 11 mission landed the first humans on the Moon. Launched on July 16, 1969, the third lunar mission of NASA's Apollo Program was crewed by Commander Neil A. Armstrong, Command Module Pilot Michael Collins, and Lunar Module Pilot Edwin E. 'Buzz' Aldrin, Jr. On July 20, Armstrong and Aldrin flew the Lunar Module Eagle to the surface and became the first humans to walk on the Moon, while Collins orbited in the Command Module Columbia. The Apollo 11 mission reached President John F. Kennedy's goal of putting a man on the Moon's surface, and returning him safely to Earth, by the end of the 1960s.

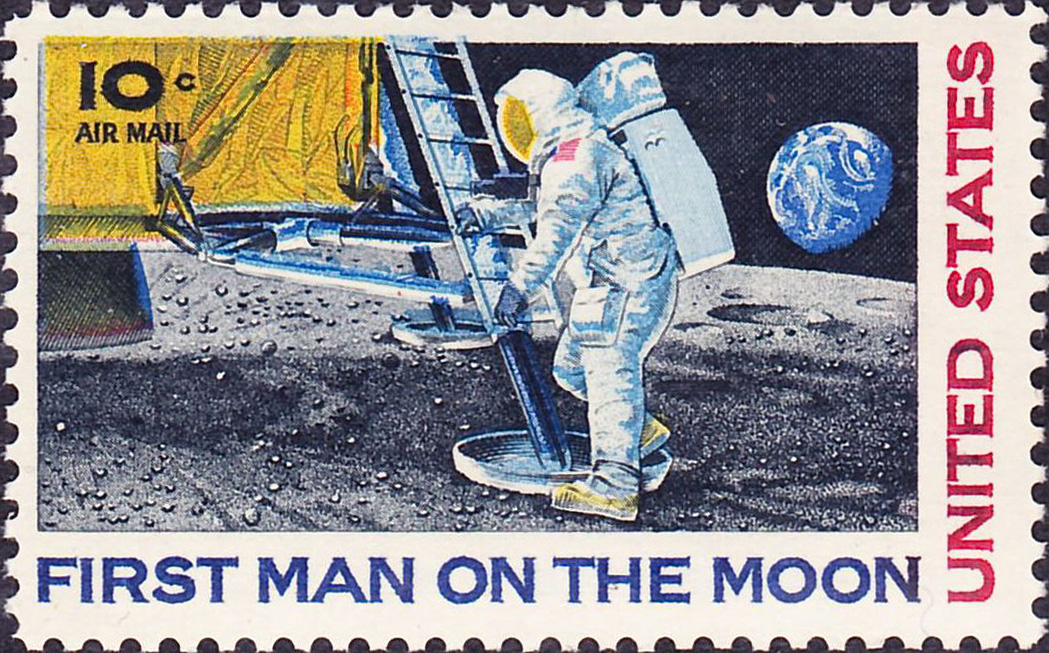
First Man on the Moon Commemorative Issue of 1969

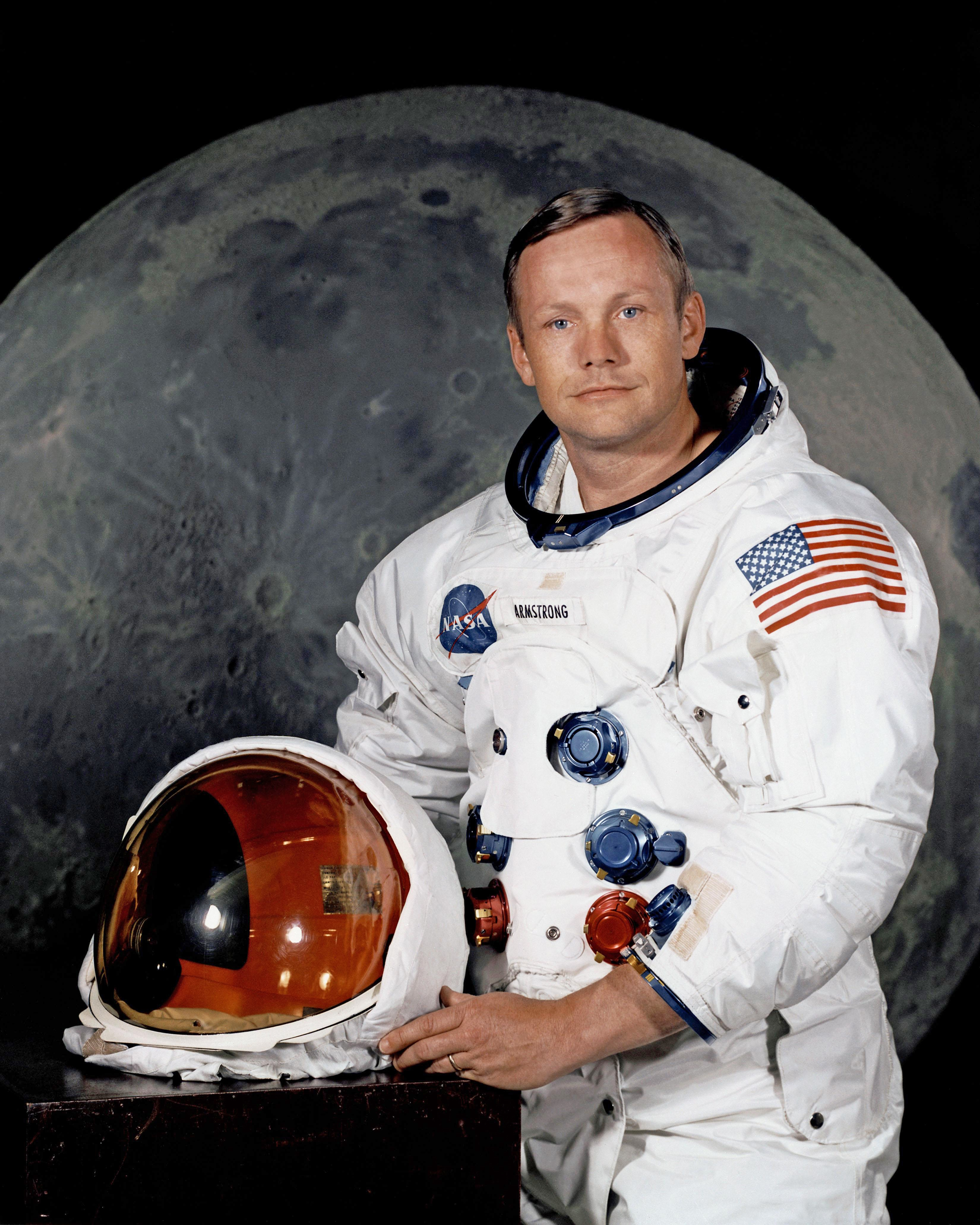
Neil Armstrong

On September 9, 1969, the U.S. Post office issued its first airmail stamp to depict a space exploration theme, the First Man on the Moon issue. The man depicted in the space suit is Neil Armstrong taking man's first step on the Moon. This issue was designed by Paul Calle. The stamp's original master die was actually flown to the Moon, and a letter with the stamp canceled on the way back. The quantities issued were more than 152 million making the issue quite common, and quite popular. Some issues are missing the red color resulting in the stripes of the flag emblem on Armstrong's arm being omitted making that issue quite scarce and expensive.

== Space Achievement Decade Issue of 1971 ==
This 'Space Achievements' issue depicts the Earth, Sun, Lunar Module, the Lunar Roving Vehicle and astronauts. Two 8-cent se-tenant stamps commemorating a decade of space achievements were placed on sale on August 2, 1971, at Kennedy Space Center, Florida, and Houston, Texas. First day covers were postmarked at two different post offices (Houston, Texas and Huntsville, Alabama, location of the two tracking stations.) rather than the usual one because of the extraordinary popularity of the space program at the time of issuance.

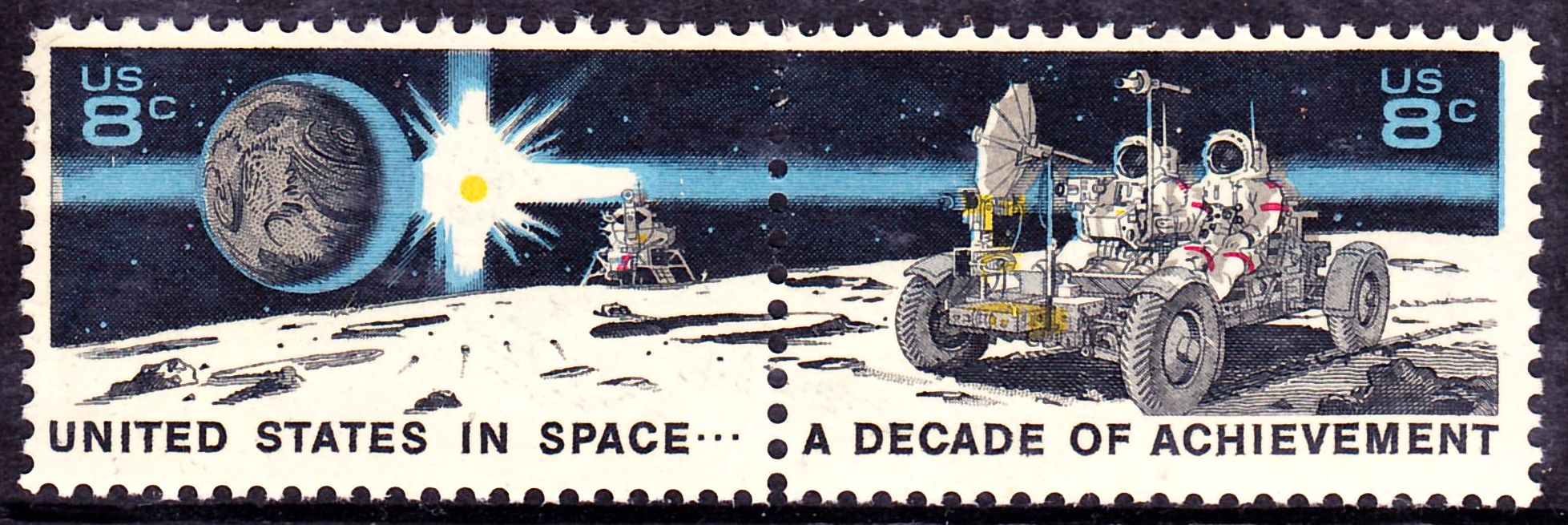
Space Achievement Decade Issue of 1971

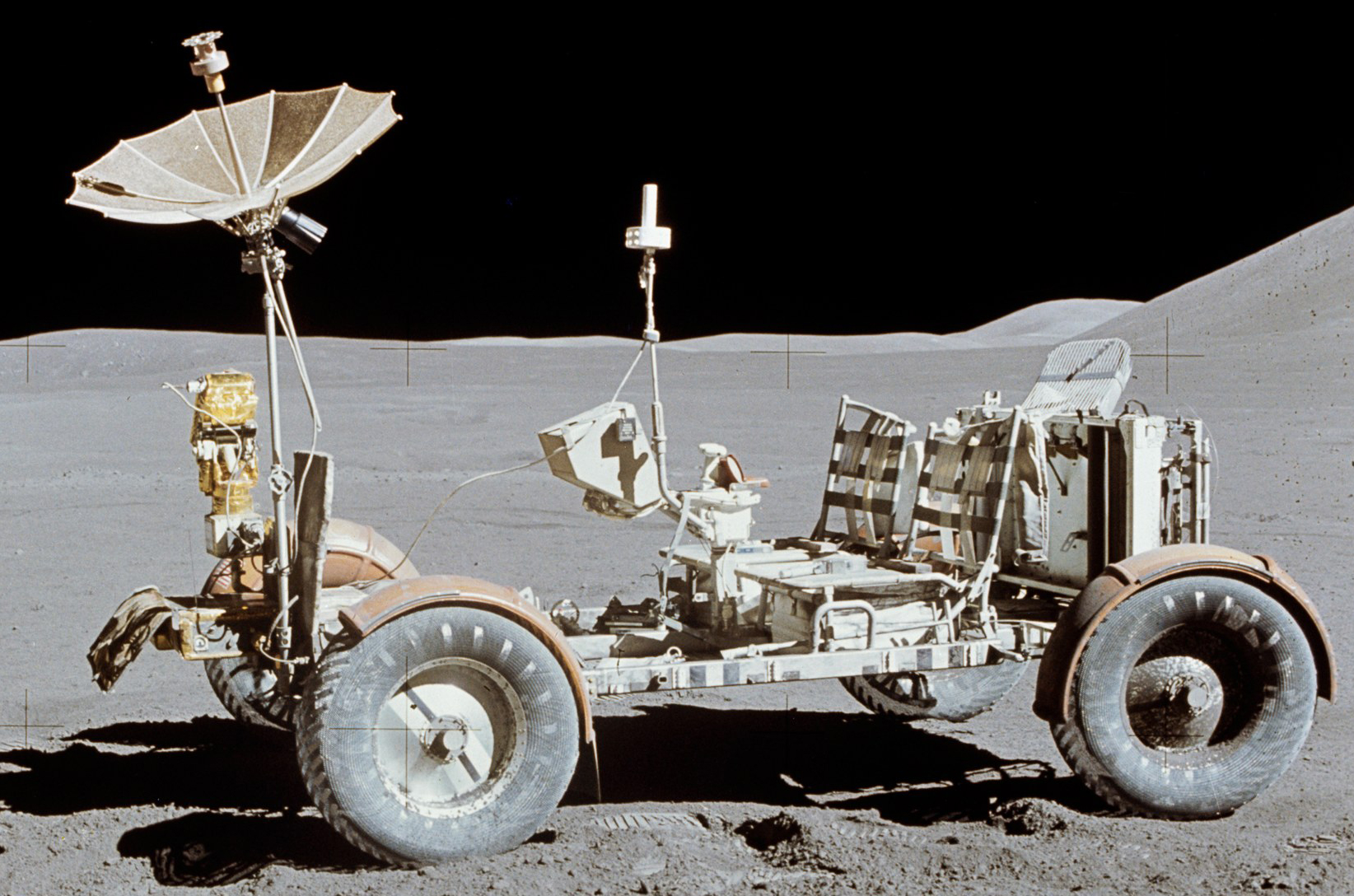
The U.S. Apollo Lunar Roving Vehicle from Apollo 15 on the Moon in 1971. (NASA)

This issue was designed by Robert T. McCall of Paradise Valley, Arizona. Upon close examination of this issue, one can see that it has an accurate depiction of the Lunar Rover, sitting on the Lunar surface. The Apollo Lunar Module can also be seen in the background. This issue (pair) came in sheets of 50 (100 individual stamps), with an initial printing of 150 million.

== Skylab Issue of 1974 ==
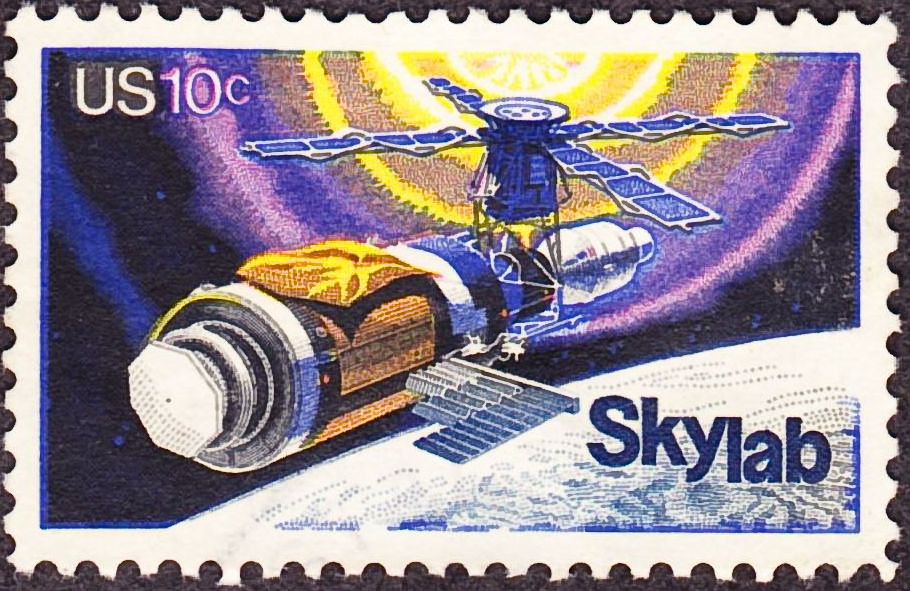
Skylab Issue of 1974

Skylab, a science and engineering laboratory, was the United States' first space station, and the second space station visited by a human crew. It was put into orbit by a Saturn V rocket on 14 May 1973. It was also the only space station NASA launched alone. The 100-ton space station was in Earth's orbit from 1973 to 1979 and it was visited by crews three times in 1973 and 1974.

Circling 50 degrees north and south of the equator at an altitude of 435 kilometres (270 mi), Skylab had an orbital period of 93 minutes. There were a plethora of UV astronomy experiments done during the Skylab lifetime, as well as detailed X-ray studies of the Sun. The station was active until July 11, 1979, when it fell out of orbit.

The 10-cent Skylab commemorative stamp first day of release took place in Houston, Texas, on May 14, 1974. This issue commemorates the first anniversary of the launching of Skylab, and depicts the station as it was repaired, complete with "umbrella" and missing the lost solar panel. The stamp was designed by Robert T. McCall and was issued in sheets of fifty, with an initial printing of 140 million.

== Pioneer Commemorative Issue of 1975 ==
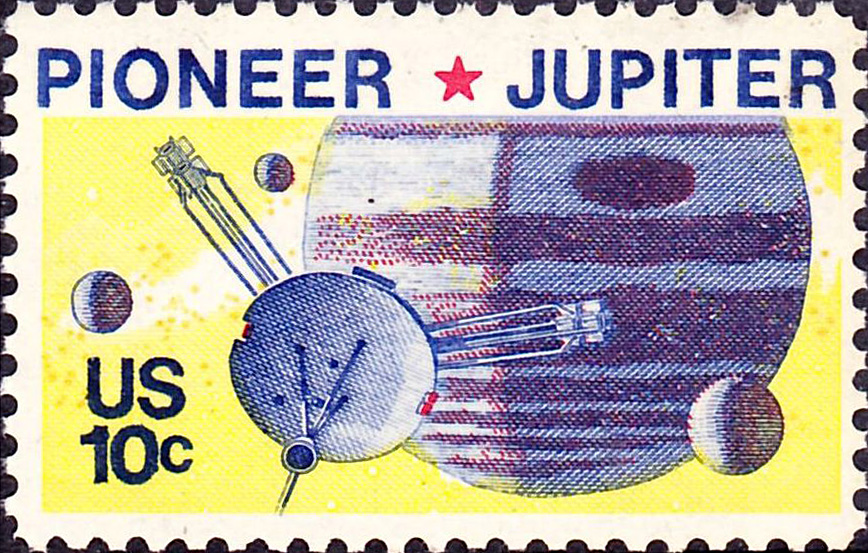
Pioneer Commemorative Issue of 1975

In March 1972, scientists at NASA launched Pioneer 10 to gather scientific data about the Solar System's largest planet, Jupiter, while the vessel was also receiving radio control and guidance signals and other information from Earth. Pioneer 10 was expected to last for 21 months in the Solar System and deliver accurate information over that period of time. The fastest manufactured object to enter space from Earth, the spacecraft was to begin collecting data at the Asteroid Belt and Jupiter and continue to relay information about other areas and phenomena of the Solar System.

After Pioneer 10 passed through the asteroid belt, Pioneer 11, was launched on a similar trajectory.

Pioneer 10 became the first spacecraft to get close enough to Jupiter to send back revelations about the properties and phenomena of the Solar System's largest planet.

The 10-cent Pioneer commemorative stamp was issued on February 28, 1975, at Mountain View, California, and paid the domestic first-class rate for letters weighing up to one ounce. Designed by Robert T. McCall and printed at the Bureau of Engraving and Printing on the Giori presses, the stamp shares numerous design elements with USA Scott 1557, the Mariner 10 Issue of 1975.

== Mariner 10 Issue of 1975 ==
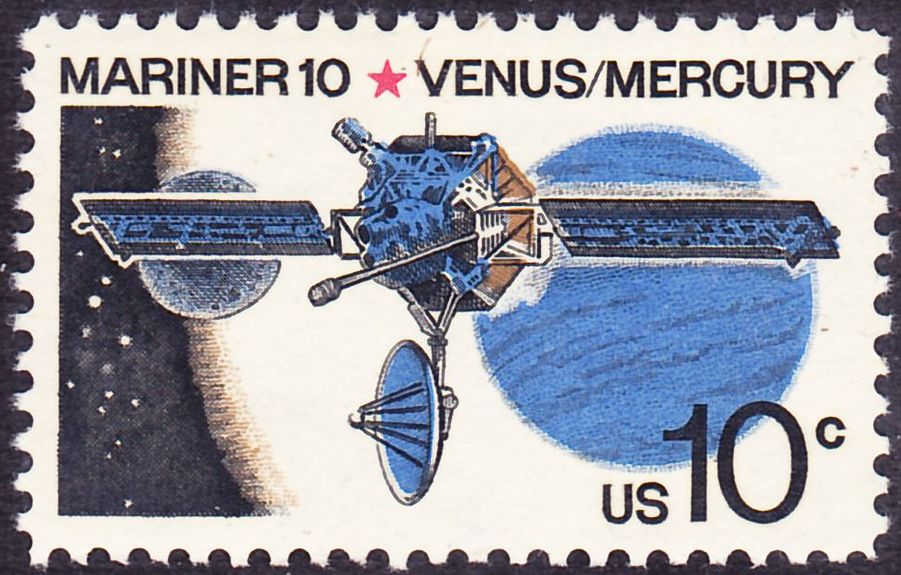
Mariner 10 Issue of 1975

Engineered to explore the orbits of Venus and Mercury, Mariner 10 launched in November 1973. The mission's two-year plan used the gravitational pull of Venus to reach Mercury. The probe also used the solar wind to help with locomotion when fuel ran low. Mariner 10 orbited the planets in the opposite direction of Earth's orbit.

Mariner's first photographed images, which revealed Venus's dense cloud cover, reached NASA scientists in February 1974. Data collected by Mariner 10 helped determine Venus's rotation period and use of Earth's magnetic field. Photos of Mercury revealed its cratered surface and its large scarps and plains. Research also recorded its radical temperature variations between night and day.

The 10-cent Mariner 10 commemorative stamp was issued on April 4, 1975, in Pasadena, California. It paid the domestic first-class rate for letters weighing up to one ounce. The stamp shares numerous design elements with USA Scott 1556, and while they have different designers and dates of issue, the two are catalogued together under the heading "U.S. Unmanned Accomplishments in Space."

Designed by Roy Gjertson, the Mariner 10 commemorative postage issue was printed at the Bureau of Engraving and Printing in multi-color on the Giori presses. Quantities issued totaled more than 158 million.

== Apollo–Soyuz Commemorative Issue of 1975 ==
With the Apollo–Soyuz mission, two nations collaborated on a space project for the first time. In July 1975, the United States launched the crewed Apollo Command module to rendezvous with Russia's crewed Soyuz module. A special docking station facilitated interaction among the astronauts. Television stations worldwide broadcast the historic docking and bi-national greeting made by the astronauts. The modules remained docked for two days, during which the teams performed numerous experiments.

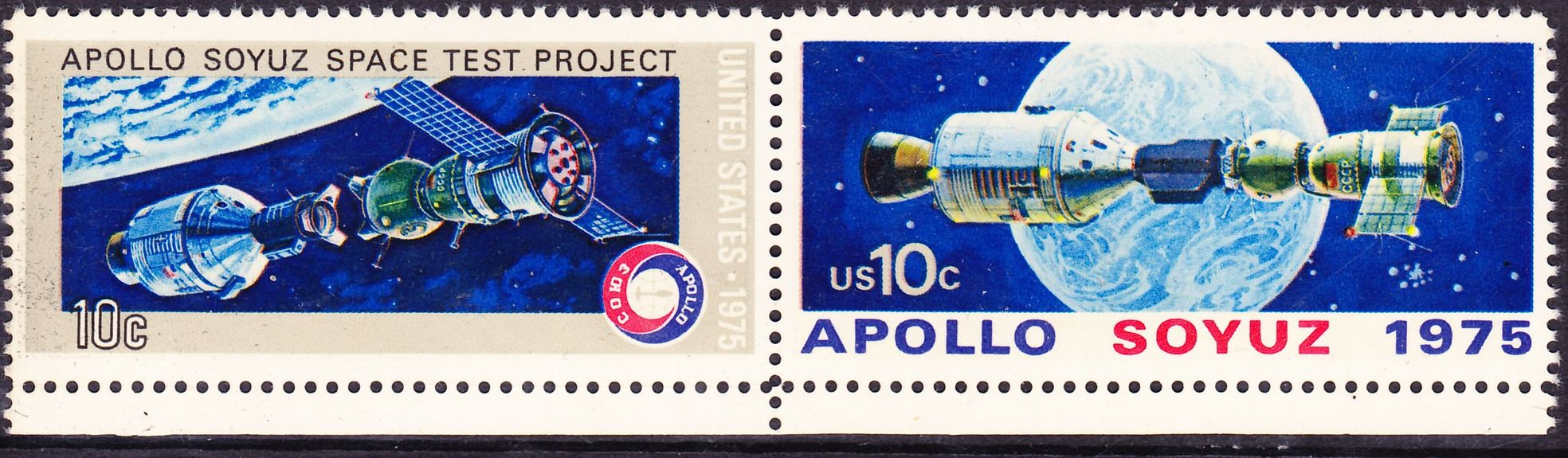
Apollo – Soyuz Commemorative Issue of 1975

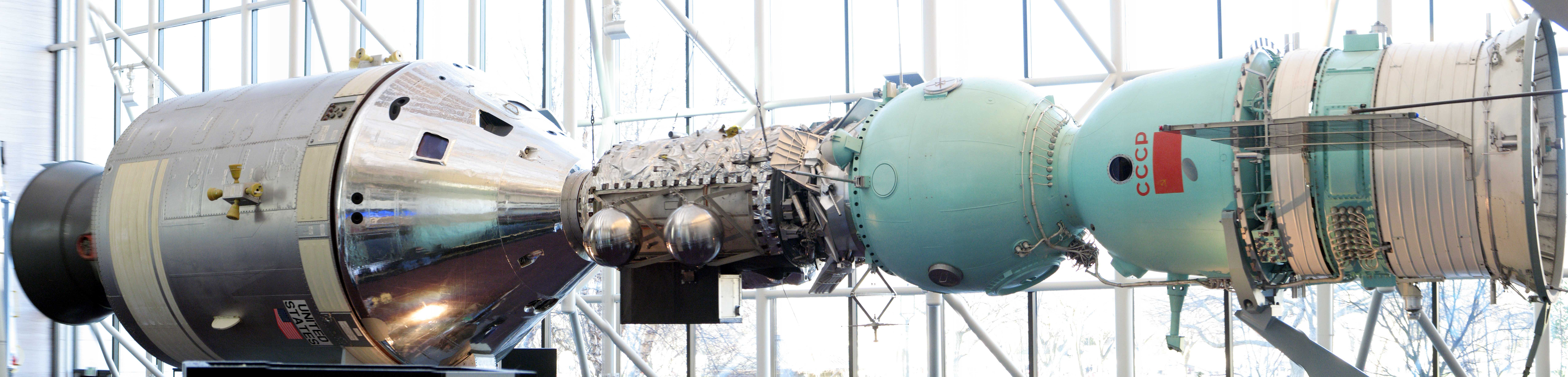
Apollo – Soyuz spacecraft linked up

The U.S. Postal Service issued this se-tenant pair of two 10-cent multicolored stamps on July 15, 1975, at Kennedy Space Center, Florida. The circular program insignia on the left-hand stamp is rotated to the Soviet configuration, showing the red Soyuz section on the left. The Soviet Union also released stamps of similar design (Russia Scott 4339–4340) at the same time. This denomination paid the domestic first-class rate for letters weighing up to an ounce.

Robert T. McCall designed the 'after link-up' image, and Anatoly Aksamit designed the 'before link-up' image. The Bureau of Engraving and Printing produced the stamps on the Andreotti press in sheets of ninety-six stamps, panes of twenty-four. Quantities issued for this pair of postage issues totaled more than 161 million.

== Viking missions to Mars, Issue of 1978 ==
Viking missions to Mars, 1978 Issue

NASA's Viking program consisted of a pair of space probes sent to Mars, Viking I and Viking II. Each vehicle was composed of two main parts, an orbiter designed to photograph the surface of Mars from orbit, and a lander designed to study the planet from the surface. The orbiters also served as communication relays for the landers once they touched down.

Upon close examination, one can discern the engraving of the landing component used to collect soil samples on Mars, the radio dish, landing gear and other equipment rendered by the engraver in this issue. The U.S. Postal Service released this issue at Hampton, Virginia, on July 20, 1978, the second anniversary of the Viking I lander's descent to the Martian surface.

The 15-cent denomination paid the new domestic rate that had recently increased from 13 cents two months earlier for a first-class letter weighing up to an ounce. It was the second such stamp issued to fulfill that rate. Designed by Robert T. McCall, the issue was printed at the Bureau of Engraving and Printing on the Giori presses in sheets of 200 stamps which were then cut into panes of fifty stamps for sale at post offices.

First day of issue ceremony took place July 20, 1978, at Hampton, Va. Quantities issued totaled more than 158 million.

== Space Achievement Issue ==
Space Achievement commemorative issue 18-cent stamps in a block of eight format

On May 21, 1981, the Post Office released the Space Achievement commemorative issue, 18-cent stamps, in a block of eight format, one image being shared by four individual stamps, with four more aside them depicting various space exploration imagery. First day of issue occurred at the Kennedy Space Center, Florida. The four central stamps depict the Space Shuttle in its various modes of operation. The central theme of this issue involves the first actual 'in space' flights of the Space Shuttle and also pays tribute to twenty years of U.S. crewed space exploration. The other stamps to the left and right sides are honoring the efforts of those who partook in the historical Moon walk, Skylab, and Pioneer 11 missions. The images were modeled by Clarance Holbert. The stamp design by Robert T. McCall.

== Space Shuttle Issues ==
The U.S. Space Shuttle stamp of 1995 depicts the famous liftoff of the Space Shuttle Endeavour, Mission STS-57, which took place on June 21, 1993, from Kennedy Space Center, Florida. This issue was designed by Phil Jordan of Falls Church, Virginia. As an extra security measure, elliptical perforations were used on sheets of stamps to identify genuine issues from those that might be counterfeited. The postage stamps were manufactured by Ashton-Potter (USA) Ltd. in the offset/intaglio process.

Space Shuttle Endeavour Issue of 1995

Space Shuttle Endeavour Issue of 1998

On June 22, 1995, in Anaheim, California, the USPS commemorated the Space Shuttle Challenger, STS-7, with the issuance of a 3-dollar postage stamp. Again designed by Phil Jordan, the stamp features the Challenger Space Shuttle. The name of the Space Shuttle was inscribed in microtype and secretly blended into the design matrix to satisfy concern about matters of security. This was the first time that the Post Office used an actual photograph from a NASA mission, instead of an illustration based on a photograph. This issue was also printed by Ashton-Potter USA, Ltd., on the offset-intaglio printer.

On November 19, 1998, in New York City, the Post Office issued the Space Shuttle Piggyback $11.75 definitive Express Mail postage stamp. With all the fanfare surrounding the United States space program, this ceremony was in conjunction with the special First Day of Issue grand event that in New York that year. This issue was also designed by Phil Jordan and was printed by the Banknote Corporation of America.

Other Space Shuttle Issues

Space Shuttle Airmail Issue of 1989

Challenger Issue of 1995

Space Shuttle Issue of 1998

Space Shuttle Program Issue of 2000

== Mars Pathfinder ==
Mars Pathfinder issue, 1997

In November 1997, to commemorate achievements of Mars Pathfinder program, $3 Priority Mail stamp was issued, and 15 million stamps have been printed. "Based on the first image received from the Mars Pathfinder after its landing on the Martian surface July 4, 1997, the stamp features the Sojourner rover resting on the Pathfinder with a panoramic view of the Ares Vallis region of Mars in the background. Informational text about the Pathfinder mission is printed on the reverse of the stamp sheet."

== See also ==
- Astrophilately
- Airmails of the United States
- List of United States airmail stamps
- Postage stamps and postal history of the United States
- Soviet space exploration history on Soviet stamps
- Topical stamp collecting
