= John H. Pugh =

American politician

Member of the U.S. House of Representatives from New Jersey's 2nd district
- In office March 4, 1877 – March 3, 1879
- Preceded by: Samuel A. Dobbins
- Succeeded by: Hezekiah Bradley Smith

Personal details
- Born: John Howard Pugh; June 23, 1827 Unionville, Chester County, Pennsylvania, US
- Died: April 30, 1905 (aged 77) Burlington, New Jersey, US
- Resting place: Saint Mary's Episcopal Churchyard
- Party: Republican
- Education: University of Pennsylvania School of Medicine
- Profession: Politician

John Howard Pugh (June 23, 1827 – April 30, 1905), was an American physician and Republican Party politician who represented New Jersey's 2nd congressional district in the United States House of Representatives for one term from 1877 to 1879.

== Early life and career ==
Born in Unionville, Chester County, Pennsylvania, Pugh attended the common schools and the Friends' School, Westtown Township, Pennsylvania.

He taught school in Marietta, Pennsylvania, in 1847.

He graduated from the University of Pennsylvania School of Medicine in 1852, and began the practice of his profession in Bristol, Pennsylvania, that year. He moved to Burlington, New Jersey, in 1854 and continued the practice of medicine.

=== Civil War ===
During the Civil War, he served as a physician without compensation at the United States general hospital in Beverly, New Jersey.

=== Banking career ===
He served as president of the Mechanics' National Bank of Burlington for thirty-six years.

== House of Representatives ==
Pugh was elected as a Republican to the Forty-fifth Congress, serving in office from March 4, 1877 – March 3, 1879, but was an unsuccessful candidate for reelection in 1878 to the Forty-sixth Congress.

== Retirement and death ==
After leaving Congress, he resumed the practice of medicine, and served as member of the State board of education.

He died in Burlington, New Jersey, April 30, 1905, and was interred in Saint Mary's Episcopal Churchyard in Burlington.

U.S. House of Representatives
Preceded by Samuel A. Dobbins	Member of the U.S. House of Representatives from New Jersey's 2nd congressional district March 4, 1877–March 3, 1879	Succeeded by Hezekiah Bradley Smith
