= J. Hart Brewer =

American politician (1844–1900)

John Hart Brewer
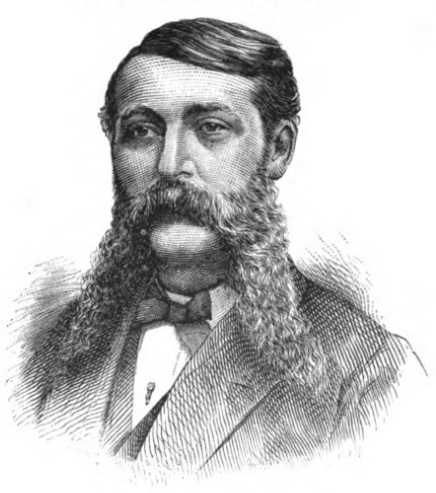
- From 1882's Public Men of To-Day by Phineas Camp Headley

Member of the U.S. House of Representatives from New Jersey's 2nd district
- In office March 4, 1881 – March 3, 1885
- Preceded by: Hezekiah Bradley Smith
- Succeeded by: James Buchanan

Member of the New Jersey General Assembly
- In office 1876

Personal details
- Born: March 29, 1844 Hunterdon County, New Jersey, US
- Died: December 21, 1900 (aged 56) Trenton, New Jersey, US
- Party: Republican
- Profession: Politician

John Hart Brewer (March 29, 1844 – December 21, 1900) was an American Republican Party politician who represented New Jersey's 2nd congressional district in the United States House of Representatives from 1881 to 1885. Brewer was the great-great-great grandson of John Hart, a signer of the United States Declaration of Independence.

Born in Hunterdon County, New Jersey, Brewer attended Lawrenceville School and Trenton Academy, and graduated from the Delaware Literary Institute, Franklin, New York, in 1862. He moved to Trenton, New Jersey, in 1865 and engaged in the manufacture of pottery. He served as member of the New Jersey General Assembly in 1876. He served as president of the National Potters' Association in 1879.

Brewer was elected as a Republican to the Forty-seventh and Forty-eighth Congresses, serving in office from March 4, 1881, to March 3, 1885.

After leaving Congress, he resumed the manufacture of pottery until 1895, when he engaged in the insurance business. He was appointed assistant appraiser of merchandise at the port of New York City by President McKinley and served until his death in Trenton, New Jersey, December 21, 1900. He was interred in Riverview Cemetery in Trenton.

U.S. House of Representatives
Preceded by Hezekiah Bradley Smith	Member of the U.S. House of Representatives from New Jersey's 2nd congressional district March 4, 1881 – March 3, 1885	Succeeded by James Buchanan
