= James Buchanan (New Jersey politician) =

American politician

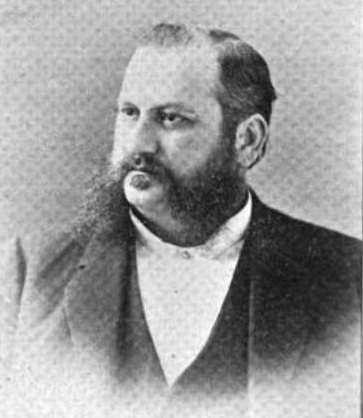

Member of the U.S. House of Representatives from New Jersey's 2nd district
- In office March 4, 1885 – March 3, 1893
- Preceded by: J. Hart Brewer
- Succeeded by: John J. Gardner

Personal details
- Born: June 17, 1839 Ringoes, New Jersey, U.S.
- Died: October 30, 1900 (aged 61) Trenton, New Jersey, U.S.
- Party: Republican
- Profession: Politician

James Buchanan (June 17, 1839 – October 30, 1900) was an American Republican Party politician who represented New Jersey's 2nd congressional district in the United States House of Representatives from 1885 to 1893.

== Biography ==
Born in the Ringoes section of East Amwell Township, New Jersey, Buchanan attended the public schools and Clinton Academy. He studied law at Albany Law School, was admitted to the bar in 1864 and commenced practice in Trenton, New Jersey. Reading clerk of the New Jersey General Assembly in 1866. He served as member of the Trenton Board of Education in 1868 and 1869. Presiding judge of Mercer County 1872–1877. He served as delegate to the 1872 Republican National Convention. He was appointed a member of the board of trustees of Peddie Institute, Hightstown, New Jersey, in 1875. He served as member of the Common Council of Trenton 1883–1885.

Buchanan was elected as a Republican to the Forty-ninth and to the three succeeding Congresses (March 4, 1885 – March 3, 1893). He served as chairman of the Committee on Manufactures in the Fifty-first Congress. He declined to be a candidate for renomination in 1892. He resumed the practice of law in Trenton.

Buchanan was elected city solicitor of Trenton May 7, 1900, and served until his death. Trustee of Bucknell College in Lewisburg, Pennsylvania. He died in Trenton, New Jersey, on October 30, 1900, and was interred in Mountain View Cemetery, Cherryville, New Jersey.

U.S. House of Representatives
Preceded by J. Hart Brewer	Member of the U.S. House of Representatives from New Jersey's 2nd congressional district March 4, 1885 – March 3, 1893	Succeeded by John J. Gardner
