= Hezekiah B. Smith =

American investor and politician (1816–1887)

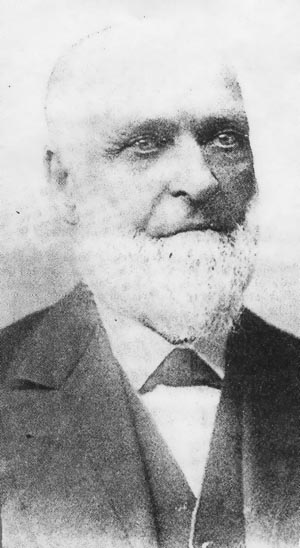

Member of the U.S. House of Representatives from New Jersey's 2nd district
- In office March 4, 1879 – March 3, 1881
- Preceded by: John H. Pugh
- Succeeded by: J. Hart Brewer

Member of the New Jersey Senate from Burlington County
- In office 1883–1886
- Preceded by: William Budd Deacon
- Succeeded by: William H. Carter

Personal details
- Born: Hezekiah Bradley Smith; July 24, 1816 Windsor County, Vermont, U.S.
- Died: November 3, 1887 (aged 71) Burlington County, New Jersey, U.S.
- Resting place: Pine Street Cemetery in Mount Holly, New Jersey
- Party: Democratic
- Spouse(s): Eveline Verona English; Agnes Mitilda Gilkerson
- Profession: Inventor, politician

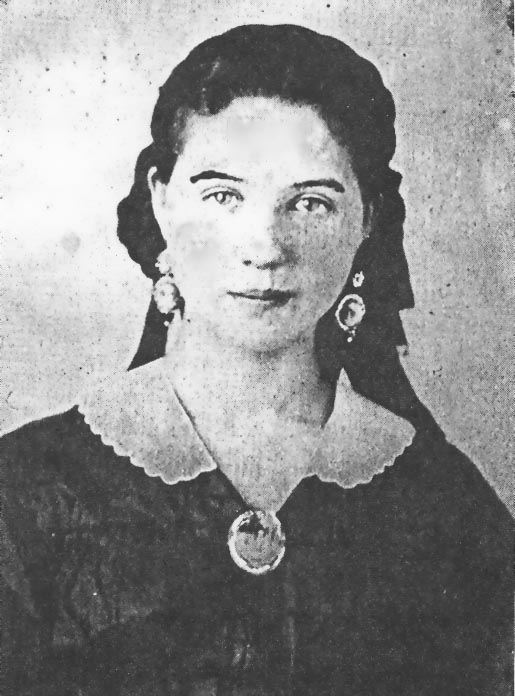
Agnes M. Gilkerson (1840–1881) c. 1865

Hezekiah Bradley Smith (July 24, 1816 – November 3, 1887) was an American inventor and a Democratic Party politician who represented New Jersey's 2nd congressional district in the United States House of Representatives for one term from 1879 to 1881.

== Birth, early career, and marriage ==
Smith was born in Bridgewater, Vermont, on July 24, 1816. After completing an eighth grade education, he was trained as a cabinet maker and set up shop in a former tannery building. Smith left the Woodstock District in 1846, taking with him Eveline Verona English, whom he married in a civil ceremony in May 1846, in their Boston hotel room. Smith and his wife moved first to Manchester, New Hampshire, where Smith made a living carving wooden patterns while learning the machine business. In July 1846, their first child, Ella, was born. In the spring of 1847 in Manchester there was a scarlet fever epidemic known as 'ship fever', and Eveline took the child Ella and returned to Woodstock. They would never again live together as husband and wife.

== Separation ==
Smith moved on to Lebanon, New Hampshire, where he began to manufacture items to other people's specifications, including such items as the Howe sewing machine. Smith took the first sewing machine ever to be found in Woodstock and gave it to Eveline, herself a renowned tailor, ensuring her own independence. Smith later moved on from Lebanon to Boston, Massachusetts, where he began manufacturing woodworking machinery of his own design. He subsequently moved his business to Lowell, Massachusetts. However, he continued to visit his wife in Woodstock, fathering three sons with her: Elton (born in 1848), Eugene V. (born 1851) and Edward A. (born 1853).

In Lowell, in the summer of 1854, Smith was introduced to Agnes Mitilda Gilkerson (1838–1881). Gilkerson was a mill girl working in a textile factory and living in a boarding house. Smith hired her as his confidential secretary, then sent her to Mrs. Rodgers' finishing school. By 1859, Gilkerson would convince Smith that she should go further with her education. Smith sent her to live with the family of the manager of his Philadelphia sales office. There Gilkerson attended Penn Medical University, graduating in the spring of 1861 with a degree in medicine, with a major in chemistry.

== Wife abandoned and expunged ==
In 1865, Smith visited with Benjamin Shreve in Medford, New Jersey. Shreve had a $100,000 investment in his deceased brother's business. Smith managed to acquire from Shreve basically the entire town of Shreveville, in Eastampton Township, Burlington County, for only $20,000. Before moving to his new acquisition (soon to be renamed Smithville), Smith made a final journey to Woodstock to the home he had purchased in 1861 for his wife, Eveline Smith. There he demanded a divorce, but his wife refused to agree to one. Smith then demanded everything he had written her since 1847, which he then burnt in her stove. He then went to the town clerk's office, where he transferred ownership of the house to his wife's maiden name, then to the bank where he established an account, again in her maiden name, and deposited a few hundred dollars. Finally, he went to his sister's house, where he demanded the family Bible. Upon being given the Bible by his sister, he used his pocketknife to excise all record of his marriage and children from the family tree recorded within, burning the paper scraps in his sister's stove. Having completed what he felt to be a divorce, he left Woodstock, never to return.

Smith and Gilkerson were married in a civil ceremony in Lowell that same year, and the two of them made their home in Smithville. There, he continued his business of manufacturing woodworking machinery, while she practiced medicine and made and sold herbal remedies. Smith also published the New Jersey Mechanic trade journal, which his second wife also edited; she also advertised her medical wares in it. In January 1881, Gilkerson died of cancer, without producing any children for Smith. After her death, Smith commissioned an Italian marble statue in her likeness and stood it on a brick pedestal under an iron canopy in the formal garden of the mansion at Smithville.

== Inventions ==
Smith had over forty patents for his inventions with the United States Patent Office. The Smithsonian Institution describes Smith as having taken the woodworking business from hand tools to mechanized. His business (which he incorporated in 1878 under the name "H.B. Smith Machine Company") In addition to the woodworking tools which were the staple of his business, he also manufactured the American Star Bicycle. This bicycle differed from others of its time by having a larger back wheel, where the rider sat, and a smaller front wheel for steering. The Star was driven by ratchet drive, had a hand brake and a sprung leather seat. The Star sold for $150 at a time when the average person earned $500 a year. Not the greatest of commercial successes, it was however fast, and a great stunt bike, winning many track races, endurance rides, and stunt exhibitions, as well as being a great advertising tool for the Smith Machine Co. He also manufactured the first steam-driven vehicle operated in New Jersey, although only one was ever manufactured as he died before it could go into regular production. On his desk at the time of his death was a prototype of an autogiro.

== Political career and bigamy ==
He was elected as a Democrat to the 46th United States Congress, serving one term from March 4, 1879, to March 3, 1881. During the election it was discovered that he was a bigamist. He was not re-elected to the 47th United States Congress; however, it is likely that his defeat was a result of the changing winds of American politics and not a reflection on the electorate's opinion of his bigamy, as that year James A. Garfield's Republican Party dominated the election. Smith later served as a member of the New Jersey Senate, from 1883 to 1885.

== Death, burial and aftermath ==
Smith died in Smithville, Burlington County, New Jersey, on November 3, 1887. He was buried next to his second wife, in the Saint Andrews section of the Pine Street Cemetery in Mount Holly, New Jersey. Upon the death of his mother, in 1897, Elton Smith, Hezekiah's oldest son, went to Mount Holly in an attempt to remove his father's remains. He wanted them transported to Woodstock to be buried next to his mother. Hezekiah had anticipated any attempts to move his body, and had been interred in an iron coffin encased in an iron cage that had been set in concrete. Elton then had the statue of his father's second wife toppled, broken into pieces, ground to dust and scattered along Rancocas Creek, using workers from the family business.

== Legacy ==
Smith's papers are archived at Rutgers University, in Special Collections and University Archives, Rutgers University Libraries, New Brunswick, New Jersey. Smith's great-great-great-grandson is former Congressman Jim Marshall of Georgia.

== Patents ==
- U.S. patent 6,343 April 17, 1849; H.B. Smith; Mortiser for window-blind stiles
- U.S. patent 10,422 January 10, 1854; H.B. Smith; Mortising-machine
- U.S. patent 13,663 October 9, 1855; H.B. Smith; Mortising machine
- U.S. patent 17,701 June 30, 1857; H.B. Smith; Mortising machine mortising machines
- U.S. patent 20,824 July 6, 1858; H.B. Smith; Balanced head for molding machine
- U.S. patent 25,221 August 23, 1859; H.B. Smith; Mortising machine
- U.S. patent 50,178 September 26, 1865; H.B. Smith; Improvement in planing-machines
- U.S. patent 50,637 October 24, 1865; H.B. Smith; Improvement in planing-machines
- U.S. patent 52,219 January 23, 1866; H.B. Smith; Improvement in tenoning-machines
- U.S. patent 138,103 April 22, 1873; H.B. Smith; Improvement in scroll-saws
- U.S. patent 398,548 February 26, 1889; H.B. Smith; Steam-powered Tricycle

U.S. House of Representatives
Preceded by John H. Pugh	Member of the U.S. House of Representatives from New Jersey's 2nd congressional district March 4, 1879 – March 3, 1881	Succeeded by J. Hart Brewer
