= Eastampton Township, New Jersey =

Township in Burlington County, New Jersey, US

- Township
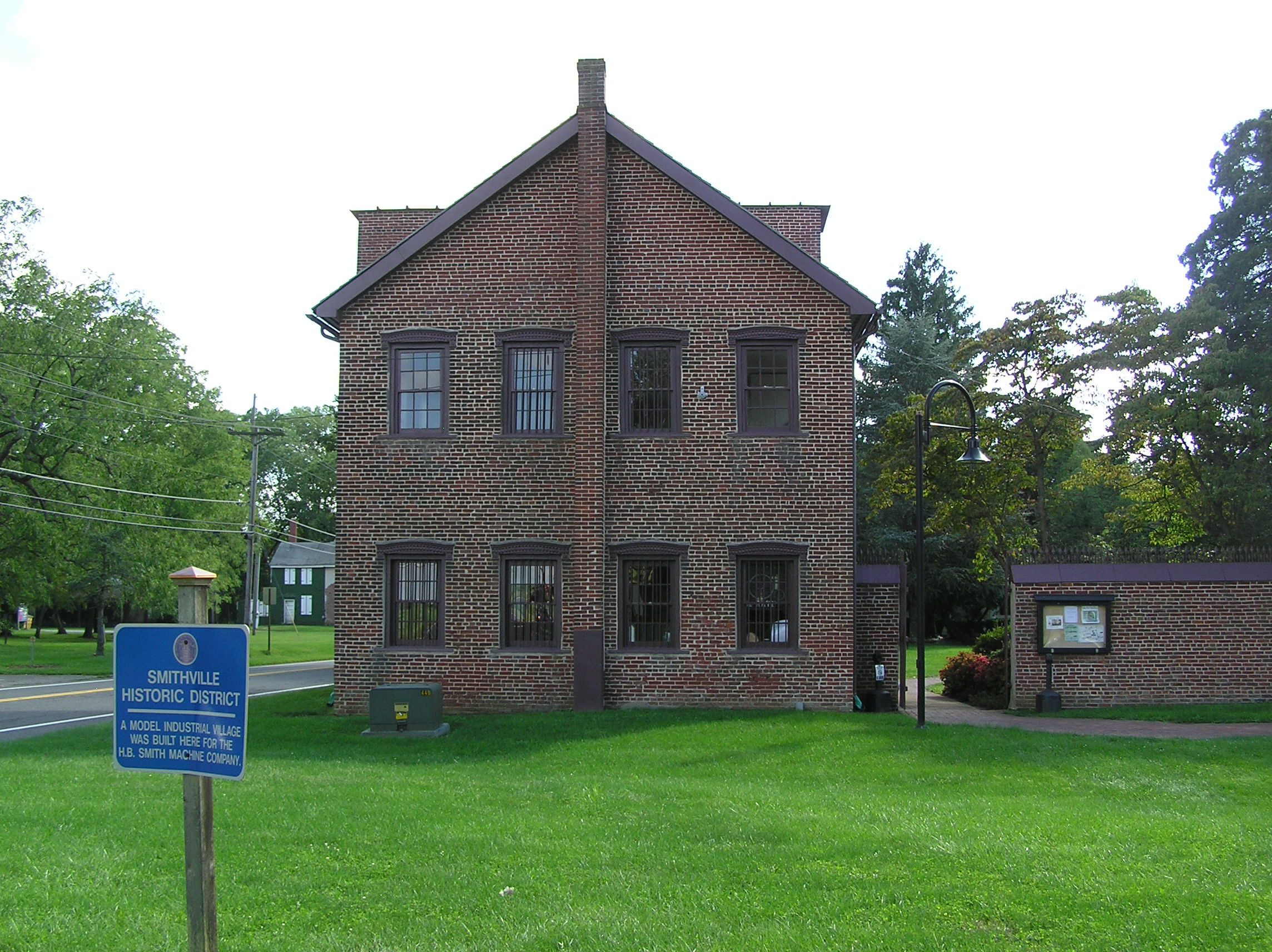
- Old schoolhouse within the Smithville Historic District in Eastampton Township

- Seal

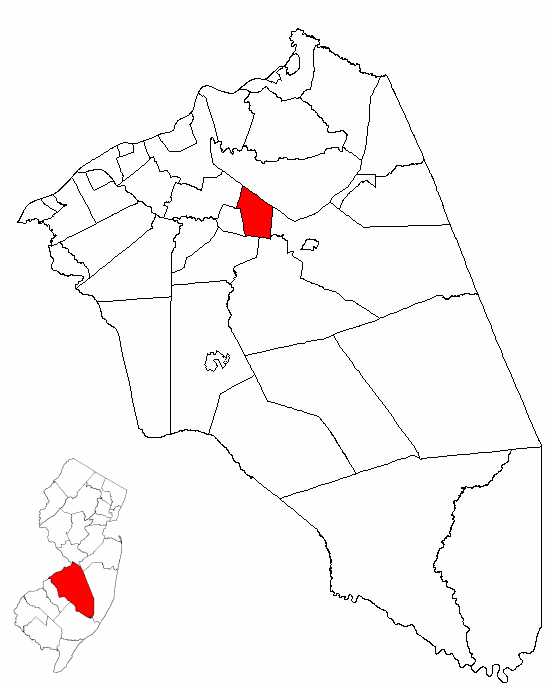
- Location of Eastampton Township in Burlington County highlighted in red (right). Inset map: Location of Burlington County in New Jersey highlighted in red (left).

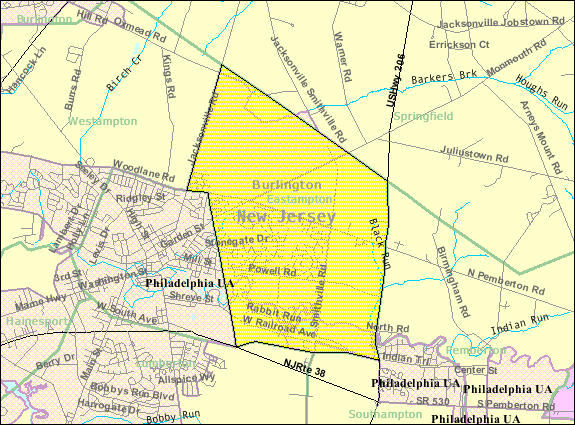
- Census Bureau map of Eastampton Township, New Jersey

- Location in Burlington County Location in New Jersey Location in the United States
- Coordinates: 40.000279°N 74.756547°W
- Country: United States
- State: New Jersey
- County: Burlington
- Incorporated: March 9, 1880

Government
  - Type: Faulkner Act (council–manager)
  - Body: Township Council
  - Mayor: Dominic F. Santillo (Democratic Party, term ends December 31, 2026)
  - Deputy Mayor: Octavia Lee (D, 2026)
  - Manager: Kim-Marie White
  - Municipal clerk: Kim-Marie White

Area
  - Total: 5.81 sq mi (15.06 km^{2})
  - Land: 5.73 sq mi (14.84 km^{2})
  - Water: 0.085 sq mi (0.22 km^{2}) 1.48%
  - Rank: 261st of 565 in state 26th of 40 in county
- Elevation: 46 ft (14 m)

Population (2020)
  - Total: 6,191
  - Estimate (2023): 6,438
  - Rank: 340th of 565 in state 27th of 40 in county
  - Density: 1,080.5/sq mi (417.2/km^{2})
  - Rank: 373rd of 565 in state 23rd of 40 in county
- Time zone: UTC−05:00 (Eastern (EST))
  - Summer (DST): UTC−04:00 (Eastern (EDT))
- ZIP Code: 08060 – Mount Holly
- Area code: 609
- FIPS code: 3400518790
- GNIS feature ID: 0882105
- Website: www.eastampton.com

Eastampton Township is a township in Burlington County, in the U.S. state of New Jersey. As of the 2020 United States census, the township's population was 6,191, an increase of 122 (+2.0%) from the 2010 census count of 6,069, which in turn reflected a decline of 133 (−2.1%) from the 6,202 counted in the 2000 census. The township, and all of Burlington County, is a part of the Philadelphia metropolitan area.

== History ==
Eastampton Township was incorporated as a township by an act of the New Jersey Legislature on February 11, 1880, from portions of Westampton. Portions of both Lumberton and Southampton townships were annexed in 1882.}

Eastampton is the location of Smithville, an industrial community created by Hezekiah Bradley Smith for his machine company, which produced the American Star Bicycle. It is now a county park.

== Geography ==
According to the United States Census Bureau, the township had a total area of 5.82 square miles (15.06 km^{2}), including 5.73 square miles (14.84 km^{2}) of land and 0.09 square miles (0.22 km^{2}) of water (1.48%).

The township borders the Burlington County municipalities of Lumberton, Mount Holly, Pemberton Township, Southampton Township, Springfield Township and Westampton.

Unincorporated communities, localities and place names located partially or completely within the township include Smithville and Turpentine.

== Demographics ==
Historical population
Census	Pop.	Note	%±
1880	566		—
1890	654		15.5%
1900	584		−10.7%
1910	508		−13.0%
1920	539		6.1%
1930	503		−6.7%
1940	498		−1.0%
1950	692		39.0%
1960	1,402		102.6%
1970	2,284		62.9%
1980	3,814		67.0%
1990	4,962		30.1%
2000	6,202		25.0%
2010	6,069		−2.1%
2020	6,191		2.0%
2023 (est.)	6,438		4.0%
Population sources: 1880–2000; 1880–1920 1880–1890; 1890–1910 1850–1930; 1940–2000 2000; 2010 2020

=== 2010 census ===
The 2010 United States census counted 6,069 people, 2,281 households, and 1,640 families in the township. The population density was 1,055.6 per square mile (407.6/km^{2}). There were 2,380 housing units at an average density of 414.0 per square mile (159.8/km^{2}). The racial makeup was 73.11% (4,437) White, 16.97% (1,030) Black or African American, 0.35% (21) Native American, 4.48% (272) Asian, 0.07% (4) Pacific Islander, 1.65% (100) from other races, and 3.38% (205) from two or more races. Hispanic or Latino of any race were 8.29% (503) of the population.

Of the 2,281 households, 33.5% had children under the age of 18; 54.8% were married couples living together; 12.9% had a female householder with no husband present and 28.1% were non-families. Of all households, 22.9% were made up of individuals and 5.4% had someone living alone who was 65 years of age or older. The average household size was 2.66 and the average family size was 3.15.

24.5% of the population were under the age of 18, 10.1% from 18 to 24, 25.3% from 25 to 44, 31.3% from 45 to 64, and 8.7% who were 65 years of age or older. The median age was 38.0 years. For every 100 females, the population had 93.1 males. For every 100 females ages 18 and older there were 91.6 males.

The Census Bureau's 2006–2010 American Community Survey showed that (in 2010 inflation-adjusted dollars) median household income was $73,393 (with a margin of error of +/− $10,010) and the median family income was $91,375 (+/− $8,669). Males had a median income of $60,405 (+/− $4,400) versus $44,028 (+/− $8,940) for females. The per capita income for the borough was $32,065 (+/− $2,298). About 3.0% of families and 5.0% of the population were below the poverty line, including 6.8% of those under age 18 and 3.2% of those age 65 or over.

=== 2000 census ===
As of the 2000 United States census there were 6,202 people, 2,226 households, and 1,638 families residing in the township. The population density was 1,077.9 inhabitants per square mile (416.2/km^{2}). There were 2,312 housing units at an average density of 401.8 per square mile (155.1/km^{2}). The racial makeup of the township was 78.25% White, 11.77% African American, 0.23% Native American, 5.42% Asian, 1.44% from other races, and 2.90% from two or more races. Hispanic or Latino of any race were 4.72% of the population.

There were 2,226 households, out of which 42.2% had children under the age of 18 living with them, 61.2% were married couples living together, 8.4% had a female householder with no husband present, and 26.4% were non-families. 21.5% of all households were made up of individuals, and 4.5% had someone living alone who was 65 years of age or older. The average household size was 2.78 and the average family size was 3.29.

In the township the population was spread out, with 29.5% under the age of 18, 7.0% from 18 to 24, 35.3% from 25 to 44, 21.0% from 45 to 64, and 7.2% who were 65 years of age or older. The median age was 35 years. For every 100 females, there were 99.0 males. For every 100 females age 18 and over, there were 98.2 males.

The median income for a household in the township was $66,406, and the median income for a family was $71,765. Males had a median income of $46,486 versus $31,208 for females. The per capita income for the township was $24,534. About 2.0% of families and 2.9% of the population were below the poverty line, including 2.0% of those under age 18 and 4.3% of those age 65 or over.

== Government ==
=== Local government ===
Eastampton Township is governed the Faulkner Act (formally known as the Optional Municipal Charter Law) under the Council-Manager system of municipal government (Plan E), implemented based on the recommendations of a Charter Study Commission as of January 1, 1983. The residents of Eastampton adopted the council–manager form of New Jersey municipal government based on a referendum passed in 1982. The township is one of 42 municipalities (of the 564) statewide that use this form of government. The Eastampton Township Council is comprised of five members elected at-large in partisan elections to staggered four-year terms of office, with either two or three seats coming up for election in even-numbered years as part of the November general election. The mayor and deputy mayor are selected by the council from among its members at a reorganization meeting held each year during the first week of January. The mayor coordinates the work of the council, chairs council meetings and is the township's public representative. The mayor also signs all contracts and obligations of the Township and is empowered to perform marriages.

As of 2026, members of the Eastampton Township Council are Mayor Dominic F. Santillo (D, term on council and as mayor ends December 31, 2026), Deputy Mayor Octavia Lee (D, term on council ends 2028; term as deputy mayor ends 2026), Maria Rivera (D, 2028), Ricardo J. Rodriguez (D, 2026) and Steven Schilling (D, 2028).

=== Federal, state and county representation ===
Eastampton Township is located in the 3rd Congressional District and is part of New Jersey's 8th state legislative district.

For the 119th United States Congress, New Jersey's 3rd congressional district is currently represented Herb Conaway (D, Delran Township). New Jersey is represented in the United States Senate by Democrats Cory Booker (Newark, term ends 2027) and Andy Kim (Moorestown, term ends 2031).

For the 2026–2027 session, the 8th legislative district of the New Jersey Legislature is represented in the New Jersey Senate by Latham Tiver (R, Southampton Township) and in the General Assembly by Anthony Angelozzi (D, Hammonton) and Andrea Katz (D, Chesterfield Township).

Burlington County is governed by a Board of County Commissioners comprised of five members who are chosen at-large in partisan elections to serve three-year terms of office on a staggered basis, with either one or two seats coming up for election each year; at an annual reorganization meeting, the board selects a director and deputy director from among its members to serve a one-year term. As of 2026, Burlington County's Commissioners are: Director Felicia Hopson (D, Willingboro Township, term as commissioner ends December 31, 2027; term as director ends 2026), Deputy Director Allison Eckel (D, Medford, term as commissioner ends 2028; term as deputy director ends 2026), Randy Brolo (D, Lumberton, 2026; elected to an unexpired term), Tyler Burrell (D, Delran Township, 2027) and Tom Pullion (D, Edgewater Park, 2026).

Burlington County's constitutional officers are Clerk Joanne Schwartz (D, Southampton Township, 2028), Sheriff James H. Kostoplis (D, Bordentown, 2028) and Surrogate Brian J. Carlin (D, Burlington Township, 2026).

=== Politics ===
United States presidential election results for Eastampton Township 2024 2020 2016 2012 2008 2004
Year	Republican		Democratic		Third party(ies)	
Year	No.	%	No.	%	No.	%
2024	1,327	38.79%	2,054	60.04%	40	1.17%
2020	1,401	39.04%	2,130	59.35%	58	1.62%
2016	1,125	39.85%	1,572	55.69%	126	4.46%
2012	1,069	38.89%	1,651	60.06%	29	1.05%
2008	1,172	39.57%	1,754	59.22%	36	1.22%
2004	1,269	46.55%	1,442	52.90%	15	0.55%

As of March 2011, there were a total of 3,610 registered voters in Eastampton Township, of which 1,160 (32.1% vs. 33.3% countywide) were registered as Democrats, 772 (21.4% vs. 23.9%) were registered as Republicans and 1,678 (46.5% vs. 42.8%) were registered as Unaffiliated. There were no voters registered to other parties. Among the township's 2010 Census population, 59.5% (vs. 61.7% in Burlington County) were registered to vote, including 78.8% of those ages 18 and over (vs. 80.3% countywide).

n the 2012 presidential election, Democrat Barack Obama received 1,651 votes (59.7% vs. 58.1% countywide), ahead of Republican Mitt Romney with 1,069 votes (38.6% vs. 40.2%) and other candidates with 29 votes (1.0% vs. 1.0%), among the 2,766 ballots cast by the township's 3,802 registered voters, for a turnout of 72.8% (vs. 74.5% in Burlington County). In the 2008 presidential election, Democrat Barack Obama received 1,754 votes (58.8% vs. 58.4% countywide), ahead of Republican John McCain with 1,172 votes (39.3% vs. 39.9%) and other candidates with 36 votes (1.2% vs. 1.0%), among the 2,981 ballots cast by the township's 3,786 registered voters, for a turnout of 78.7% (vs. 80.0% in Burlington County). In the 2004 presidential election, Democrat John Kerry received 1,442 votes (52.6% vs. 52.9% countywide), ahead of Republican George W. Bush with 1,269 votes (46.3% vs. 46.0%) and other candidates with 15 votes (0.5% vs. 0.8%), among the 2,741 ballots cast by the township's 3,458 registered voters, for a turnout of 79.3% (vs. 78.8% in the whole county).

Gubernatorial election results for Eastampton Township
Year	Republican		Democratic		Third party(ies)	
Year	No.	%	No.	%	No.	%
2025	1,188	36.68%	2,037	62.89%	14	0.43%
2021	1,025	45.64%	1,209	53.83%	12	0.53%
2017	648	39.75%	949	58.22%	33	2.02%
2013	945	59.14%	637	39.86%	16	1.00%
2009	886	48.36%	818	44.65%	128	6.99%
2005	745	45.23%	833	50.58%	69	4.19%

In the 2013 gubernatorial election, Republican Chris Christie received 945 votes (58.4% vs. 61.4% countywide), ahead of Democrat Barbara Buono with 637 votes (39.4% vs. 35.8%) and other candidates with 16 votes (1.0% vs. 1.2%), among the 1,617 ballots cast by the township's 3,796 registered voters, yielding a 42.6% turnout (vs. 44.5% in the county). In the 2009 gubernatorial election, Republican Chris Christie received 886 votes (48.2% vs. 47.7% countywide), ahead of Democrat Jon Corzine with 818 votes (44.5% vs. 44.5%), Independent Chris Daggett with 99 votes (5.4% vs. 4.8%) and other candidates with 29 votes (1.6% vs. 1.2%), among the 1,840 ballots cast by the township's 3,760 registered voters, yielding a 48.9% turnout (vs. 44.9% in the county).

United States Senate election results for Eastampton Township1
Year	Republican		Democratic		Third party(ies)	
Year	No.	%	No.	%	No.	%
2024	1,158	34.91%	2,109	63.58%	50	1.51%
2018	1,084	42.85%	1,295	51.19%	151	5.97%
2012	973	37.01%	1,637	62.27%	19	0.72%
2006	781	47.28%	839	50.79%	32	1.94%

United States Senate election results for Eastampton Township2
Year	Republican		Democratic		Third party(ies)	
Year	No.	%	No.	%	No.	%
2020	1,381	39.49%	2,071	59.22%	45	1.29%
2014	651	41.76%	886	56.83%	22	1.41%
2013	416	43.47%	529	55.28%	12	1.25%
2008	1,129	41.20%	1,572	57.37%	39	1.42%

== Education ==
For kindergarten through eighth grade, public school students are served by the Eastampton Township School District at Eastampton Community School. As of the 2022–23 school year, the district, comprising one school, had an enrollment of 584 students and 50.0 classroom teachers (on an FTE basis), for a student–teacher ratio of 11.7:1.

Public school students in ninth through twelfth grades attend Rancocas Valley Regional High School, a regional public high school serving students from five communities encompassing approximately 40 square miles (100 km^{2}), including Eastampton Township, Hainesport Township, Lumberton, Mount Holly and Westampton. As of the 2022–23 school year, the high school had an enrollment of 1,981 students and 144.0 classroom teachers (on an FTE basis), for a student–teacher ratio of 13.8:1. The school is located in Mount Holly. The district's board of education is comprised of nine members who are elected directly by voters to serve three-year terms of office on a staggered basis, with three seats up for election each year as part of the November general election. Seats on the board are allocated based on the population of the five constituent municipalities, with one seat assigned to Eastampton.

Students from Eastampton Township, and from all of Burlington County, are eligible to attend the Burlington County Institute of Technology, a countywide public school district that serves the vocational and technical education needs of students at the high school and post-secondary level at its campuses in Medford and Westampton Township.

== Transportation ==
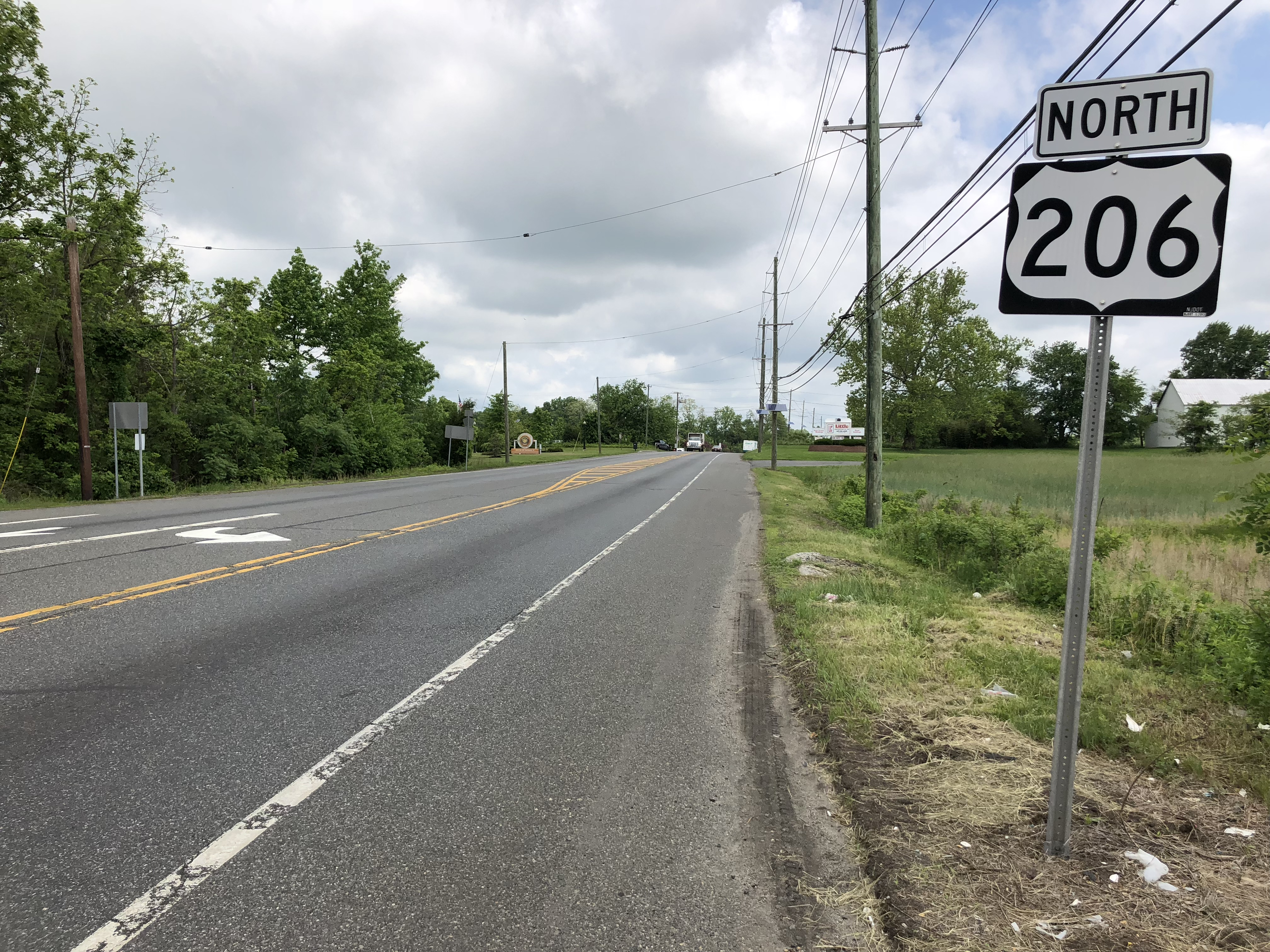
U.S. Route 206 on the east edge of Eastampton

As of May 2010, the township had a total of 30.46 miles (49.02 km) of roadways, of which 19.95 miles (32.11 km) were maintained by the municipality, 9.43 miles (15.18 km) by Burlington County and 1.08 miles (1.74 km) by the New Jersey Department of Transportation.

U.S. Route 206 is the most prominent highway serving Eastampton, running north–south along the township's border with Pemberton Township. County Route 537 also crosses the township with an east–west orientation.

== Notable people ==
People who were born in, residents of, or otherwise closely associated with Eastampton Township include:

- Charles R. Chickering (1891–1970), freelance artist who designed 77 U.S. postage stamps while working at the Bureau of Engraving and Printing
- Hezekiah Bradley Smith (1816–1887), inventor and a Democratic Party politician who represented New Jersey's 2nd congressional district in the United States House of Representatives from 1879 to 1881
