= Smithville, Burlington County, New Jersey =

Smithville, New Jersey
- Unincorporated community
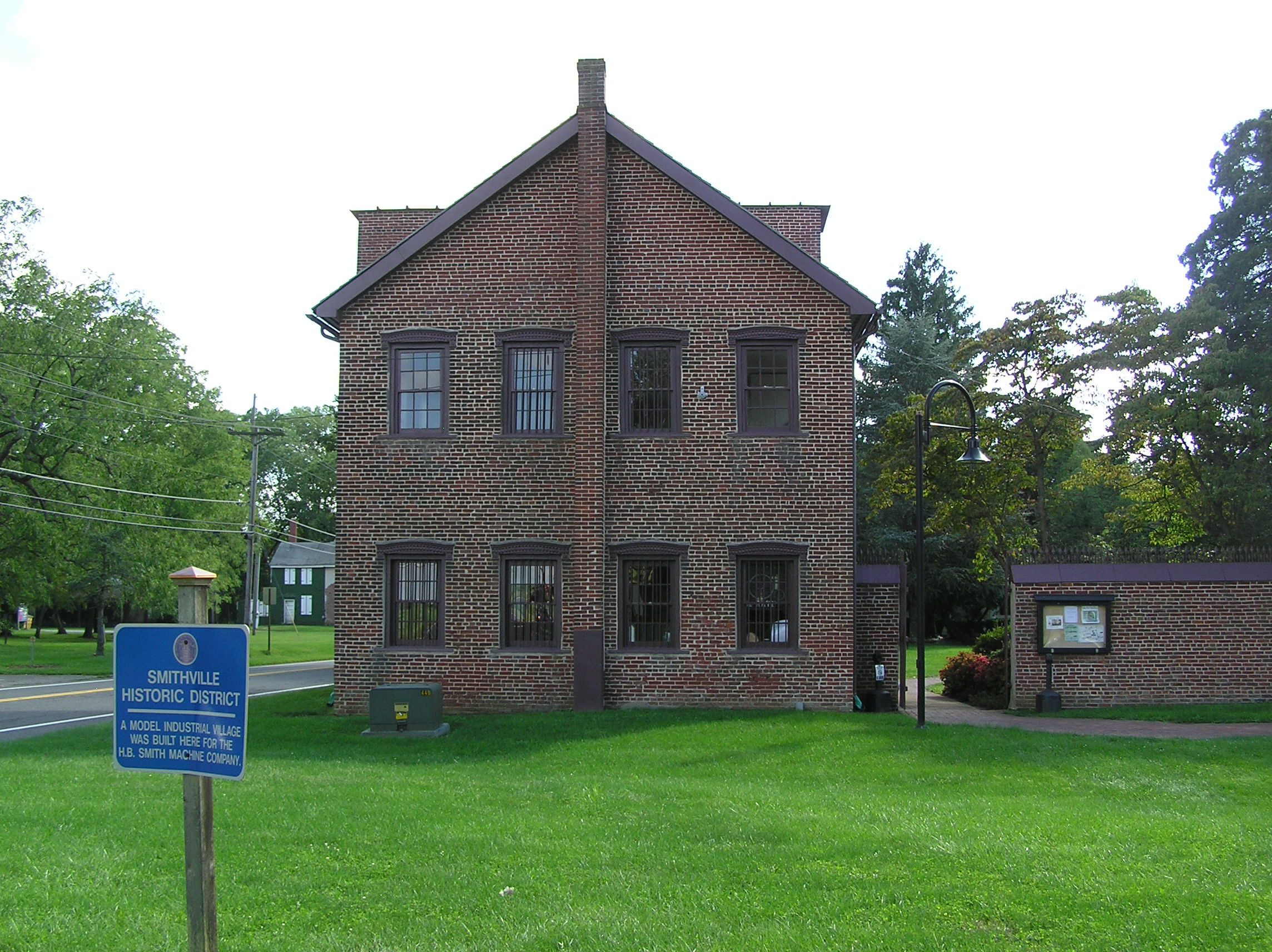
- Smithville Schoolhouse

- Location of Smithville in Burlington County (Inset: Location of county within the state of New Jersey)
- Coordinates: 39°59′09″N 74°44′55″W
- Country: United States
- State: New Jersey
- County: Burlington
- Township: Eastampton
- Elevation: 39 ft (12 m)
- Time zone: UTC-5 (Eastern (EST))
  - Summer (DST): UTC-4 (EDT)
- ZIP code: 08060
- Area code: 609
- GNIS feature ID: 880667

Smithville was a village in Eastampton Township, Burlington County, New Jersey. It was originally established as Shreveville in 1831 by Jonathan and Samuel Shreve as a textile village on the Rancocas Creek. It was purchased by Hezekiah Bradley Smith in 1865 and renamed to Smithville. The Smithville post office was established in 1866. The H. B. Smith Machine Company, which produced the American Star Bicycle beginning in 1880, was located there. In 1962, the Smithville Post Office was closed. In 1975, Burlington County purchased the property and created the first park in the county. It is listed on the National and New Jersey Registers of Historic Places as the Smithville Historic District.

== Colonial history ==
The earliest surviving record of the region of the upper Rancocas is a 1683 survey commissioned by Henry Stacy of Burlington. Stacy had purchased the land in 1676 from Edward Byllynge, the administrator of West Jersey. At the time, there was a Lenni Lenape settlement called Alumhatta in the area, but nothing was recorded of it in the survey other than its name. As a result of the survey, the Lenape Indians were forced to move out to other lands, and Alumhatta was abandoned. It is possible Stacy never saw the tract personally, as it was rather remote and he died in 1686. The area remained sparsely settled for decades; the Township of Northhampton (modern Mount Holly, New Jersey) reported only 281 (white) people in 1709.

A sawyer named Jacob Parker purchased land in the region of future Smithville in 1776, and began constructing a sawmill, gristmill, and dam there in 1780 along the Rancocas.

== Bicycle railroad ==
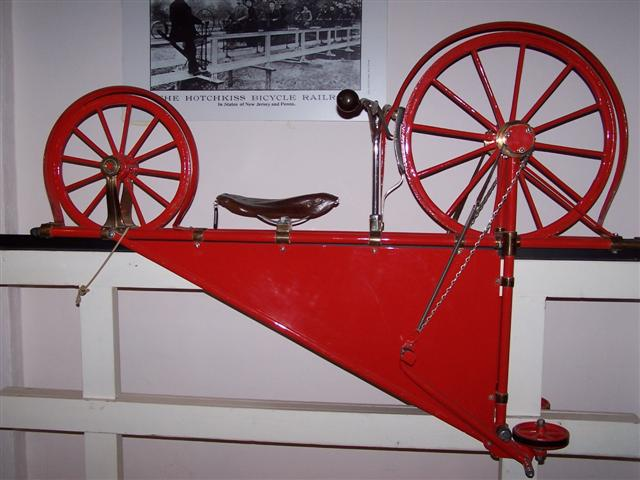
The Mount Holly and Smithville Bicycle Railway - 1892-1898

In 1892, Arthur Hotchkiss received a patent for a bicycle railroad and contracted with the Smith Machine Company to manufacture it. The initial track ran 1.8 miles (2.9 km) from Smithville, in a nearly straight line, crossing the Rancocas Creek ten times, and arrived at Pine Street, Mount Holly. It was completed in time for the Mount Holly Fair in September 1892, and the purpose of the railway was supposed to have been enabling employees to commute quickly from Mount Holly to the factory at Smithville. Monthly commuter tickets cost $2.00. The record speed on the railway was 4.5 minutes, and the average trip took 6–7 minutes. The railway was exhibited at the World's Columbian Exposition in 1893. It only had one track, so it was impossible to pass another rider, and if riders traveling in opposite directions met, one had to pull off onto a siding. By 1897 ridership had declined, and the railway fell into disrepair.

== Notable people ==
People who were born in, residents of, or otherwise closely associated with Smithville include:

- Charles R. Chickering (1891–1970), freelance artist who designed 77 U.S. postage stamps while working at the Bureau of Engraving and Printing
