= Charles R. Chickering =

American artist (1891–1970)

Charles R. Chickering

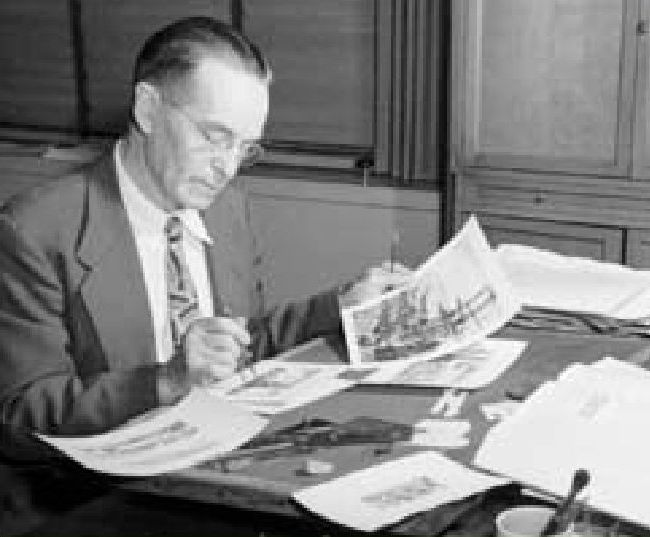
At work at the
Bureau of Engraving and Printing

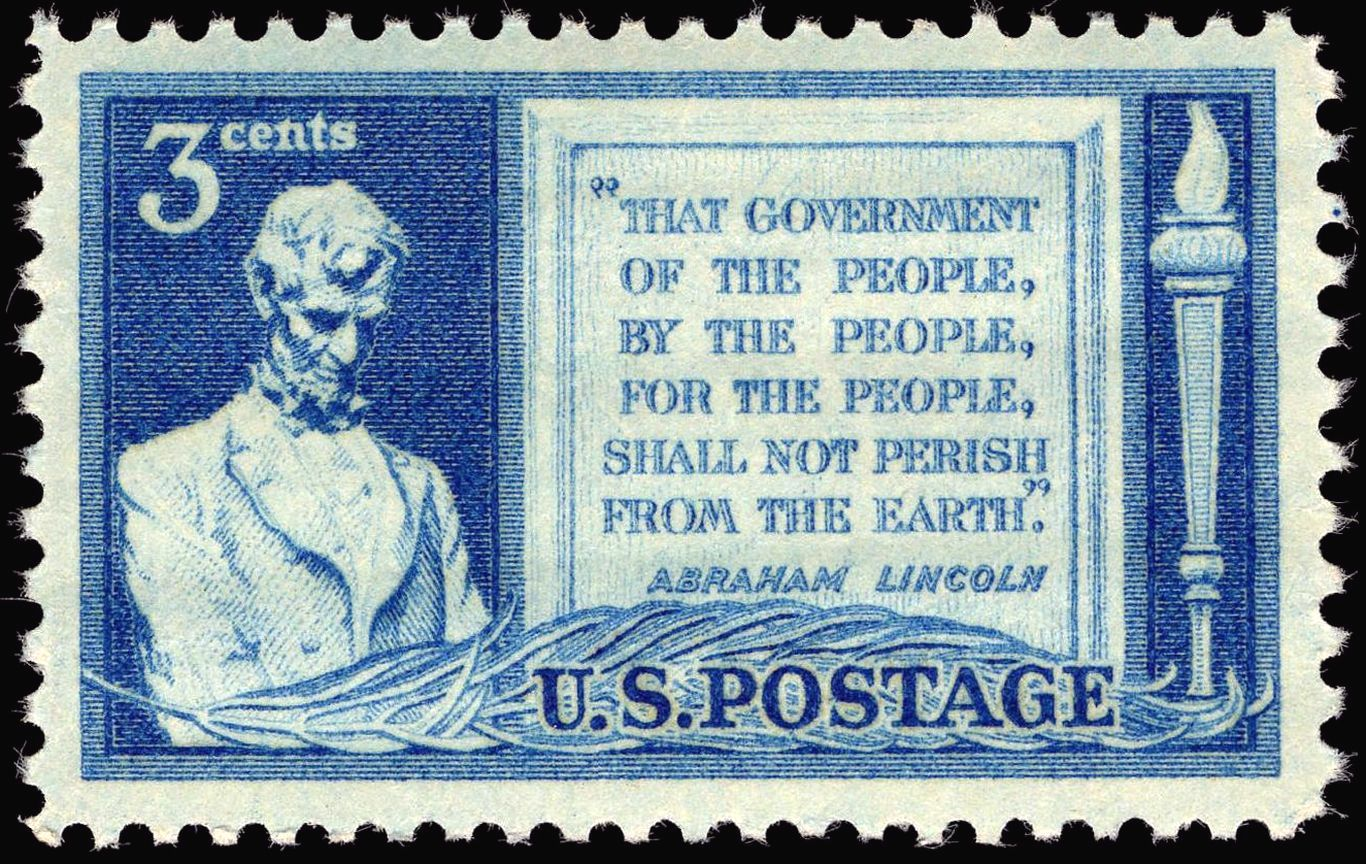
Gettysburg Address issue of 1948

Designed by Charles Chickering the First Day ceremony for this issue occurred on November 19, 1948, eighty-five years to the day after President Abraham Lincoln delivered his most famous speech at the Gettysburg National Cemetery.

Charles Ransom Chickering (October 7, 1891 – April 29, 1970) was best known as the freelance artist who designed some 77 postage stamps for the U.S. Post Office while working at the Bureau of Engraving and Printing in Washington, DC. His career as a professional artist began while working as an illustrator for the U.S. Army recording and drawing medical illustrations of the wounded and dead during the First World War. (Note: Cameras at this time were big and bulky and often not available on the battle front.) He continued the practice in civilian life and became a noted artist-illustrator who worked for a number of prominent magazines, including The Saturday Evening Post, which were very popular during the pre-television era of the 1920s to 1940s. After the Second World War Chickering began working for the U.S. Post office designing U.S. Postage stamps, some of which became famous. Later in life he became a designer and illustrator for first day cover cachets that were also popular among stamp and postal history collectors.

== Early life ==
Charles Ransom Chickering (aka "Chick") was born on October 7, 1891, in the Smithville section of Eastampton Township, New Jersey, on the Atlantic coast, not far from Philadelphia. His ability and talent to illustrate ideas and subjects came to him at an early age. While in high school he was first drawn to engineering but when a scholarship was offered to him to attend the Philadelphia Museum School of Industrial Art he accepted it which began his career as an illustrator. He graduated from this school in 1913 and soon sold his first illustrations to Collier's Magazine where his career as a freelance book and magazine illustrator was assured.

Chickering's career was temporarily put on hold when World War I broke out. His son David maintained that Charles enlisted in the US Army before they got around to drafting him, and was originally assigned to the infantry where he was soon transferred to a cavalry unit. As he often drew various illustrations of various objects in his spare time it wasn't long before the Army recognized his talent for illustration and was consequently assigned to more unusual duties. Stationed in France during the war his talents were put to use when he was assigned to duty in Dijon making medical illustrations of body-part wounds of soldiers who died in battle and were brought in for autopsy. Many of these drawings exist today as a part of a Smithsonian collection in Washington, DC. In 1919 he was discharged from the Army. According to 1920 census records he once again continued his career as a free-lance illustrator after the war.

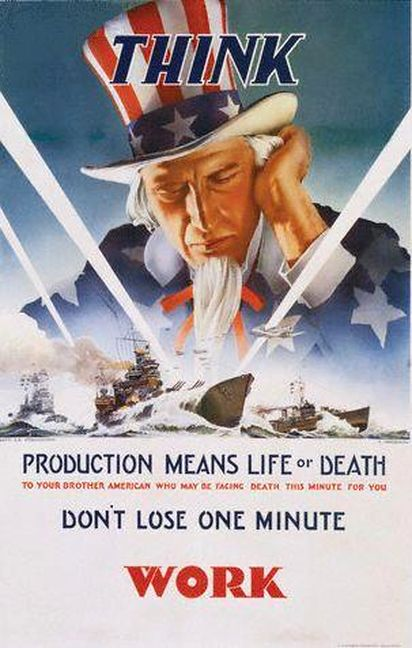
Navy recruitment poster, 1942 illustrated by Charles Chickering

== Career as artist ==
Between World Wars I and II the magazine industry flourished in the United States, with many different types of magazines emerging on the scene. During this time Chickering found plenty of opportunities producing illustrations for a number of these magazines which became popular during this time, including Collier's, Good Housekeeping, The Country Gentleman, Everybody's Magazine, Blue Book, Redbook, Cosmopolitan, Liberty, and the Saturday Evening Post which was considered to be among the most prestigious of illustrated magazines. It is believed that his illustration on the cover of the Saturday Evening Post issue of May 9, 1936, was the peak of his career as a magazine illustrator, earning him recognition in the world of art and production. However, the publication that came to have the most important relationship for Chickering, was The Blue Book Magazine whose editor and art director were both a friend and admirer of Chickering and his art work and consequently made use of his illustrations in most of the issues throughout the 1930s and into the 1950s. Some of his drawings were used in Blue Book stories like “Lady on the Warpath, The Blackout Murder, A Matter of a Pinion, and Be Sure Your Sin Will Run You In.

When World War II broke out Chickering put his talents to use contributing to the war effort. Recognized for his illustrating ability working for the Army during the first world war he was commissioned by the government and designed recruitment posters for the Navy Department. Among his most famous posters was the Uncle Sam poster of 1942. He also designing posters that promoted awareness and the need for successful civilian war production.

=== Designing U.S. postage stamps ===
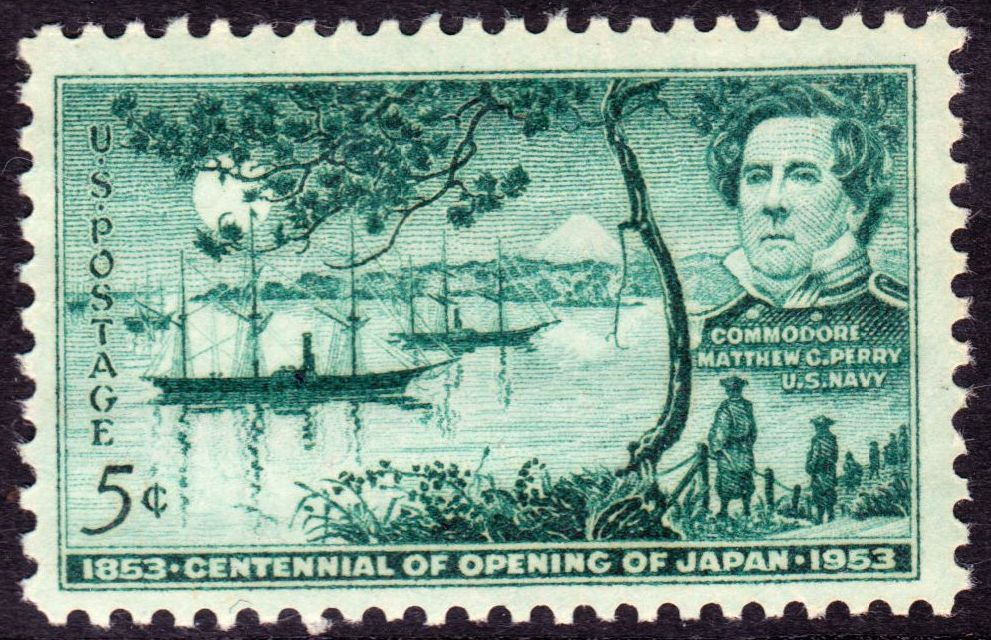
Opening of Japan commemorative stamp, first unaltered stamp design by Chickering, issued 1953

After the war Chickering embarked on a career designing U.S. postage stamps when he began working for the Bureau of Engraving and Printing (BEP), starting his career there on February 12, 1947. During Chickering's 15-year career at the BEP he was credited for designing 66 stamp designs that were produced unaltered, into the final stamp design, such as the one used in the Opening of Japan commemorative issue of 1953, while 11 other designs were modified somewhat and incorporated into a stamp format. In addition to the 77 stamps he designed Chickering is also credited as modeler for 41 U.S. issues designed by other artists and jointly as modeler for eight more.

While designing postage stamps with their frequent historical themes Chickering often spent much time researching and studying historical documents, letters, paintings, statues and photographs before creating the design for a postage stamp. When he designed the Gettysburg Address issue he studied a statue created by Daniel Chester French to create the image of Lincoln on the stamp, while the credo inscribed on the stamp is taken from Lincoln's Gettysburg Address itself.

=== Notable stamp designs ===
Chickering designed dozens of stamp issues most of which employed historic themes for their subjects.

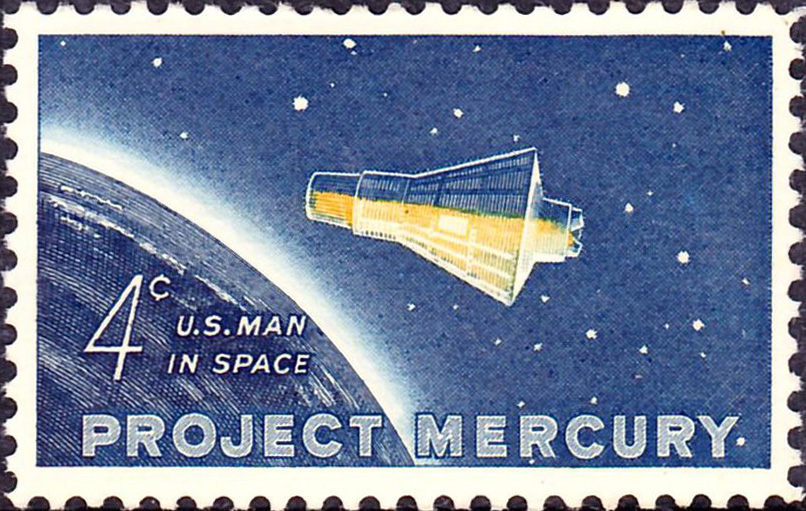
Project Mercury 1962 issue

- Project Mercury The Project Mercury stamp, issued on February 20, 1962, proved to be the most famous of Chickering's stamps designs. It was initially produced in quantities of 100 million stamps but because it proved to be so popular the U.S. Post Office ordered the printing of an additional 100 million. Before the stamp was released to the public however the success of the space mission was still not a given and so the production of this commemorative stamp was done in secrecy. To assure that the production of this stamp remained confidential Chickering did most of his design work at his own residence, while his fellow workers at the BEP were informed that he was on a vacation. The finished stamps were sent to Post offices across the country and were labeled 'Top Secret' where they finally were released to the public on February 20, 1962 at the exact hour Colonel John Glenn's flight returned to Earth.
- Among his earlier productions is the Fort Bliss commemorative issue of 1948, issued to honor the 100th anniversary of Fort Bliss in El Paso, Texas. Chickering's design was intended to portray the old and the new historical aspects of the fort's 100-year history, a difficult task for the small amount of space. Chickering designed the stamp, C.A. Brooks engraved the vignette, and A.W. Christensen engraved the border design, the lettering and the numerals.
- Overland mail In early 1957, the U.S. Post Office Department was under considerable political pressure to mark the anniversary of the Butterfield's overland mail lines with a commemorative stamp "honoring the centennial of the overland mail." Chickering was chosen to design the stamp.
- Credo issues of 1960 Examples of co-designed stamps, these issues depict quotes made by various famous Americans such as Washington, Jefferson and Lincoln. They were designed by Frank P. Conley and illustrated (modeled) by Charles Chickering.

== Personal life ==
Chickering developed heart problems which ultimately claimed his life while living in Island Heights, New Jersey, on April 29, 1970. During the months leading up to his death Chickering was still designing and producing first day covers some of which were consequently released after his death. The theme for the design of his final cachet was the South Carolina Settlement stamp issued in September 12, 1970.

== Gallery ==
This is a selection of stamps designed by Chickering.

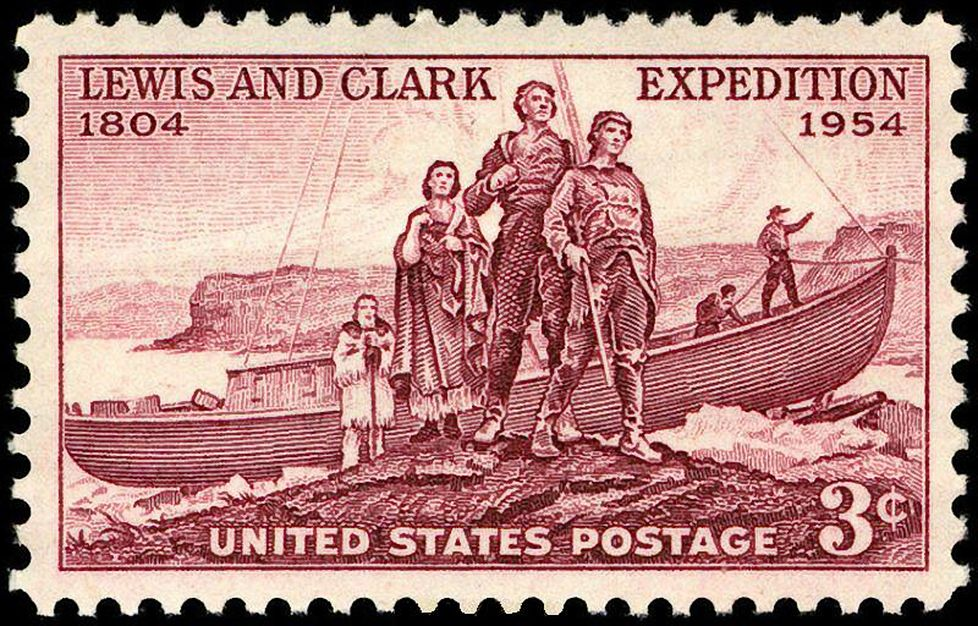
Lewis and Clark Expedition
issue of 1954

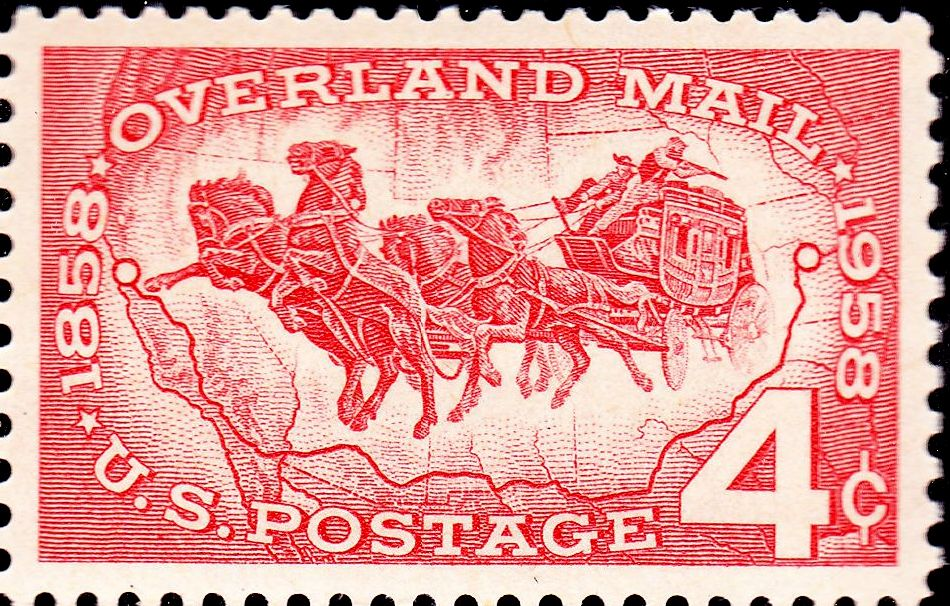
Overland Mail
issue of 1958

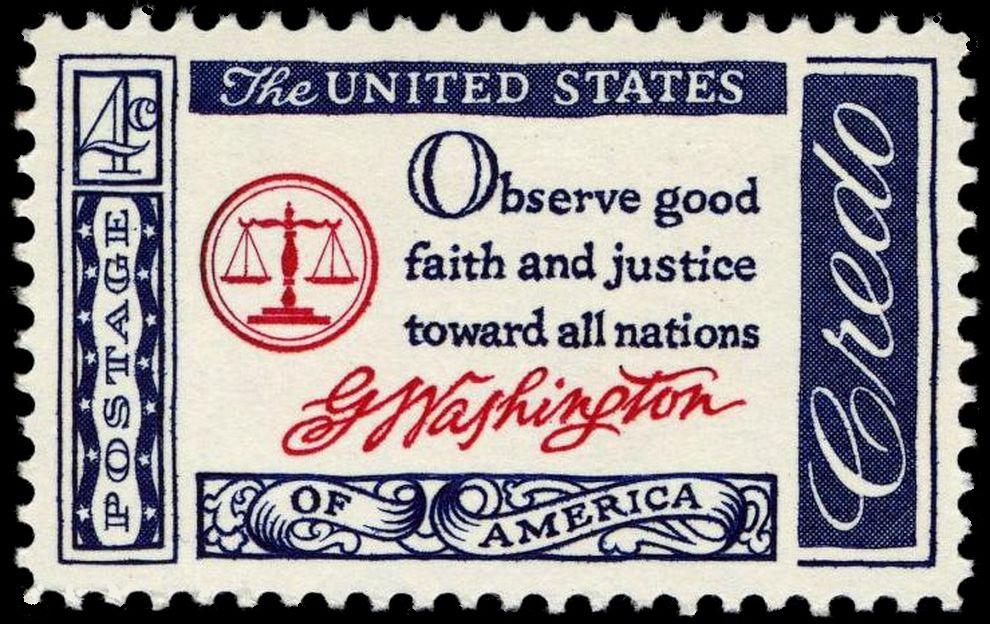
Credo Issue
issue of 1960

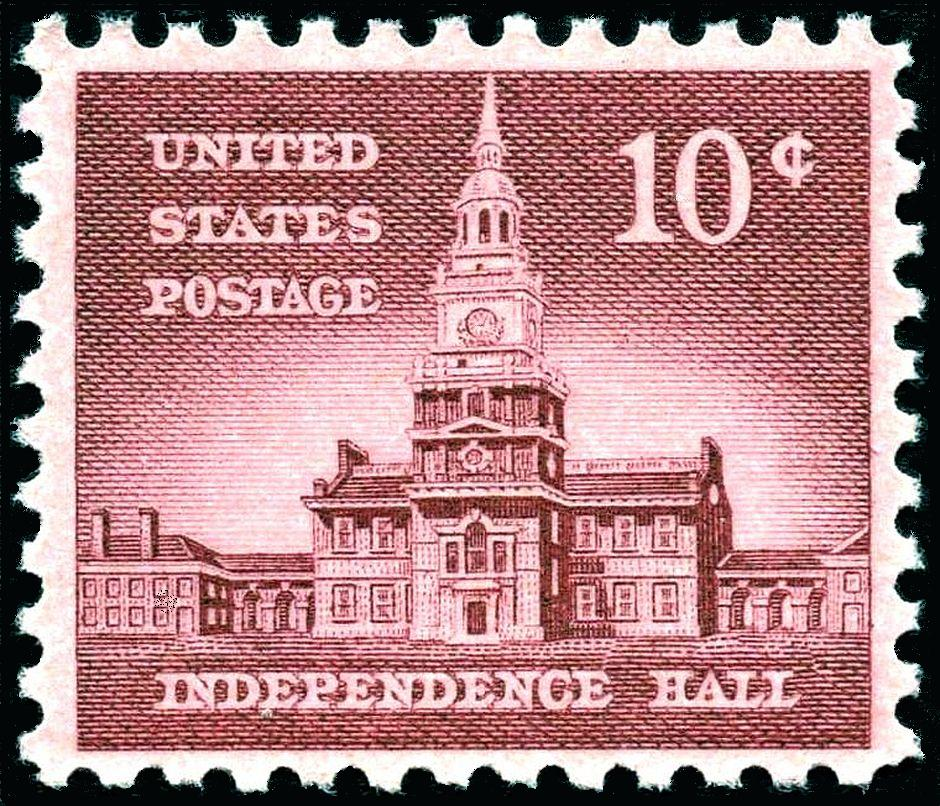
Independence Hall
Issue of 1956

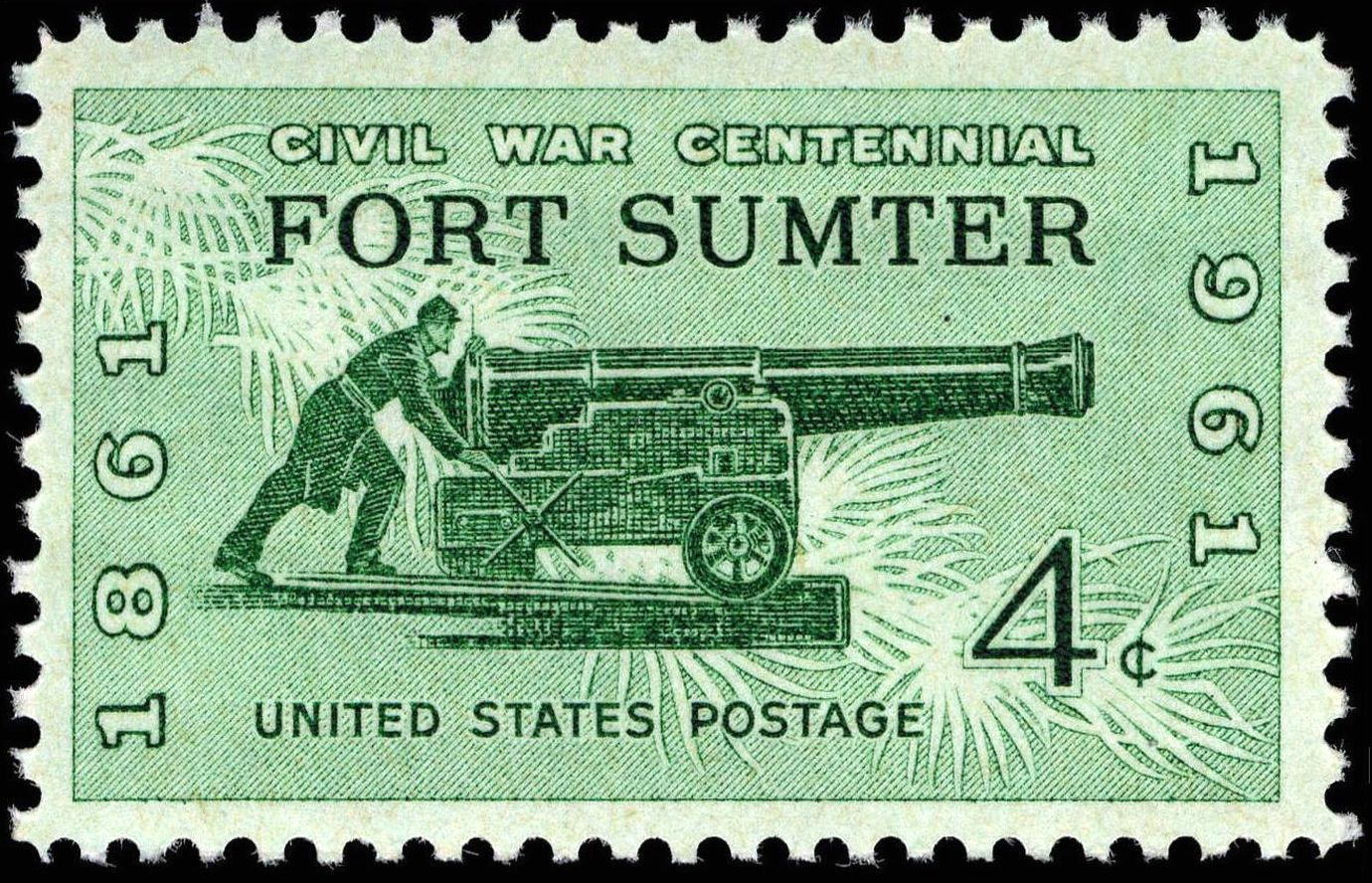
Fort Sumter
Issue of 1961

See also: Extended gallery of stamps designed by Charles Chickering

== See also ==
- Presidents of the United States on U.S. postage stamps (contains a number of Chickering's stamp designs)
- Bureau of Engraving and Printing
- Clair Aubrey Huston (Postage stamp designer for the Bureau of Engraving and Printing)
- Postage stamps and postal history of the United States
- U.S. postage stamp locator

== Bibliography ==
- Lerner, Mark (2010). Charles R. Chickering: Cachetmaker – Part I. American First Day Cover Society. pp. 10–20., Book
- Postal Bulletin (March 1, 1962). "Project Mercury Issue". Smithsonian National Postal Museum.
- Stephen J, Rod (2009). "Fort Bliss Centennial Issue". Smithsonian National Postal Museum.
- Lantos, James (2009). Thomas Jefferson. Applewood Books. p. 56., Book
- Kloetzel, James E.; Jones, William A., eds. (2010). Scott Specialized Catalogue of United States Stamps and Covers. Scott Publishing Company. ISBN 978-0-89487-446-8.
- "Fort Bliss Centennial Issue". Smithsonian National Postal Museum.
- "Fort Bliss Centennial Issue design file". Smithsonian National Postal Museum.
- Beverly; Cassie Mancer, eds. (2009). "Seven score and six years ago…". The National Postal Museum Library.
- Steven J. Rod; Thomas Lera, eds. (2009). "Gettysburg Address issue". Smithsonian National Postal Museum.
- "Overland Mail Issue". Smithsonian National Postal Museum.
- Rod Juell, ed. (2008). "4-cent Washington Quotation". Smithsonian National Stamp Museum.
