= West New York (disambiguation) =

West New York is a town in New Jersey.

It may also refer to:

- Western New York
- Staten Island, westernmost Borough in New York City
