= Christine Elizabeth Abrahamsen =

American nurse, professor, and author (1916–1995)

- Born: September 6, 1916; Oak Hill
- Died: February 7, 1995 (aged 78); Charleston
- Occupation: Writer, nurse

Christine Elizabeth Abrahamsen (September 6, 1916 – February 7, 1995) was an American nurse and professor of nursing at West Virginia University Institute of Technology. She wrote science fiction and gothic novels under the pseudonyms Christabel and Kathleen Westcott, respectively.

== Early life and nursing career ==
Christine Elizabeth Abrahamsen was born on September 6, 1916, in Oak Hill, West Virginia, the daughter of Charles Earl Campbell, an auto mechanic, and Macie Boothe. She was raised and attended school in West New York, New Jersey. She earned a nursing diploma from New York's Somerset Hospital in 1938, a bachelor's degree in nursing education from Hunter College in 1954, and a master's degree in nursing from Columbia University in 1959. After working as a nurse in various hospitals in New Jersey and New York since 1938, she became a professor of nursing at West Virginia University Institute of Technology in 1971.

== Writing ==
Abrahamsen began writing "in earnest" in 1968, describing the appeal of science fiction by commenting that "after many years of graduate study and research it was a pleasure to write something which needed absolutely no documentation". She said she took the pen name Christabel from "a fortune telling book ... it means 'good luck' and success." Her first two works were the Veltakin series of planetary romances, Manalacor of Veltakin and The Cruachan and the Killane. The Encyclopedia of Science Fiction describes her work as "written in a style that crosses the romance genre with boys' fiction". Psychic phenomena play a significant role in her work, based on her interest in the topic and her study with the Rosicrucians.

== Bibliography ==
=== As Christabel ===
- Manalacor of Veltakin (New York: Curtis Books, 1970)
- The Cruachan and the Killane (New York: Curtis Books, 1970)
- The Mortal Immortals (New York: Walker, 1971)
- The Golden Olive (New York: Curtis Books, 1972)

=== As Kathleen Westcott ===
- Bride of Kilkerran (New York: Pocket Books, 1972)

== Death ==
Abrahamsen died on February 7, 1995, in Charleston, West Virginia.
