= Cubanito 20.02 =

Cuban reggaeton/cubaton band

Cubanito
- Origin: Havana, Cuba
- Genres: Hip hop, reggaeton, cubaton
- Years active: 2003–present

Cubanito, also known by the former name Cubanito 20.02, is a Cuban reggaeton/cubaton band. The band is credited, along with the band Máxima Alerta, with popularizing cubaton, though Cubanito is influenced more by Jamaican music, whereas Máxima Alerta is influenced more by traditional Cuban music.

== History ==
Cubanito 20.02, formed in 2002, as their name suggests, and released their first album, Soy Cubanito, in 2003.

The origins of the group are in hip hop. In the mid-1990s, the three members, Haniel Gonzalez Martinez, Javier Duran Webb, and José Angel Sastre Perez, were listening to rap sounds coming from the U.S. They shortened their names to Flipper, El Doctor, and White, and they got themselves some bandanas, baseball caps and extra-baggy jeans. Their first group was called Primera Base and they scored a direct hit with their performance at the Havana Rap Festival in 1995.

The formation of Cubanito 20.02, formed by ex-members of Primera Base, was one of the first major significations of the switch from hip hop to reggaeton in Havana. Despite the lyrics from the first album's title track ("I'm a rapper first and foremost, whether you like it or not..."), their first big radio hit in Havana, "Matame", features a reggaeton sound.

The switch from “underground” hip hop with Primera Base to the sensual beats of reggaeton with Cubanito 20.02 was controversial because reggae was seen by many "pure" hip hop artists as having a "retarding effect" while "eroding traditional genres". The hip hop group Los Aldeanos released a parody of "Matame" as a criticism of the burgeoning popularity of reggaeton over hip hop.

With the new reggaeton sounds influenced by Jamaican ragga, Cubanito 20.02 became more financially successful by appealing to the youth culture. Through Cuban communist government funding, Cubanito 20.02 was able to produce multiple hit albums and even go on tour in some European countries. On the other hand, government regulations can be seen in their lyrics, which do not contain the typical reggaeton blatant sexuality and emphasis on the female body and intercourse nor does the music evoke a certain politically, socially, and culturally liberating or freeing quality that is more prevalent with reggaeton from Cuba that is not sponsored by the government. For example, their song "Pideme" contains the lyrics "soy sincero cuando digo que te quiero" (I am sincere when I tell you that I love you) and "eres la flor en mi jardin" (You are the flower in my garden). Cubanito 20.02 do not claim to tackle issues of race or violence, but rather they attempt to evoke love, happiness, and dance to their listeners.

"We wanted to do something New-York-style, something danceable, but also something Cuban," recalls Flipper. "We are a group from the barrio, from the streets. We were all friends, and we still are. We used to rap together when we were taking the bus."

Their second album, Tócame, was released in 2006.

After a tour in Europe, MC Flipper decided to settle down in Europe while El Doctor and MC White went back to Cuba where they continued their collaboration.

After several months working in-between Havana and Boston with producer Mark G (Mark Gonçalves), CUBANITO releases a new album entitled My World.

== Members ==
- Haniel Gonzalez Martinez aka Dj Flipper
- Javier Duran Webb aka El Doctor

Former member

- Jose Angel Sastre MC White

== Discography ==
- 2003 - Soy Cubanito
- 2006 – |Tócame
- 2008 - Los Jibaros
- 2012 - My World

== See also ==
- List of Cubans
