= Máxima Alerta =

Music band that popularized Cubaton

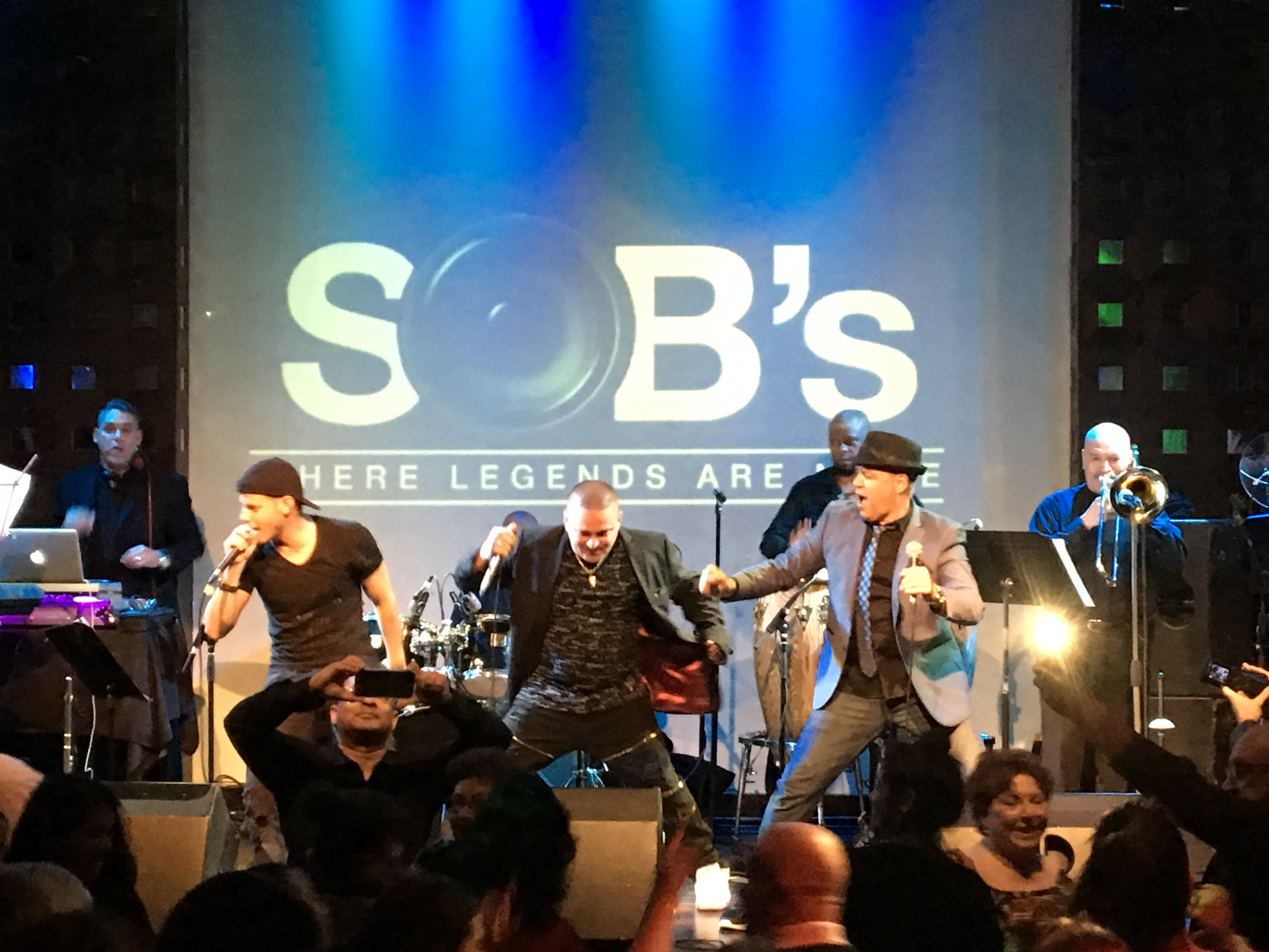
- The band performing at SOB's in New York City in 2017

Background information
- Origin: Santa Clara, Cuba
- Genres: Cuban music; reggaeton; son Cubano; conga; cumbia; merengue; salsa; Cuban rumba; rap; ballads
- Years active: 1999–present
- Label: Lusafrica
- Members: Ray Machado; Francisco Pantaleón; Yoslin Aleman; Marcos Daniel Prado
- Website: Official website

Máxima Alerta is a Cuban-American fusion music band known for its merging of Cuban reggaeton, or Cubaton, with traditional Cuban music and other Latin musical genres.

The band, founded in 1999 by Ray Machado in Santa Clara, Cuba, is credited, along with the band Cubanito 20.02, for popularizing Cubaton. Stylistically, it is known for its incorporating son Cubano, conga, cumbia, salsa, merengue, and Cuban rumba, as well as styles and forms such as rap and ballads. After the band was banned from performing in Cuba, Machado emigrated to Hudson County, New Jersey in the United States, where it resumed performing in 2011, playing in local venues such as the Park Performing Arts Center and Maxwell's, and at New York City locations such as The Bitter End.

== History ==
=== 1999 — 2011 ===
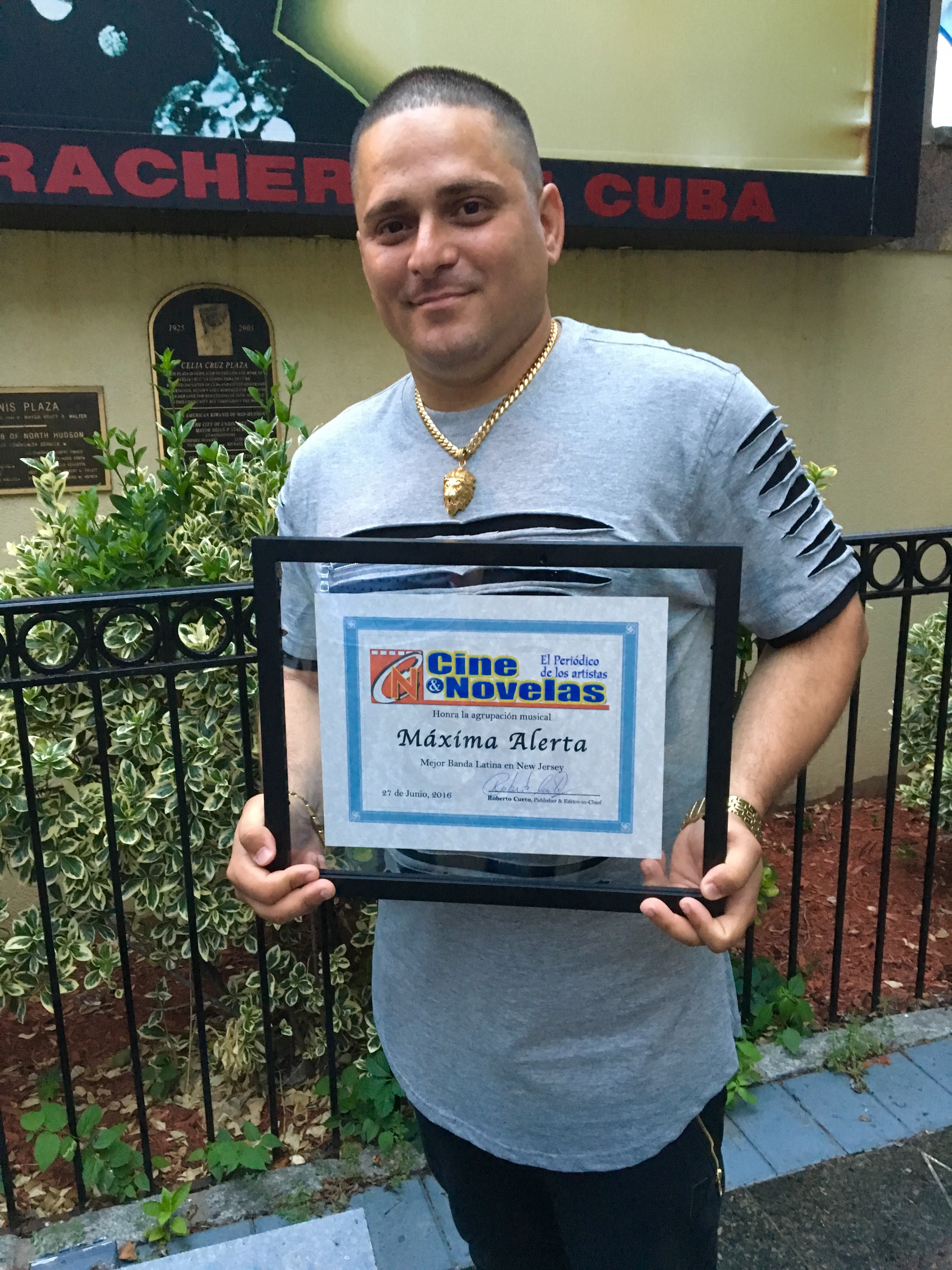
Band founder and lead singer Ray Machado receiving the Cine & Novelas Award for Best Latin Band in New Jersey at Celia Cruz Park in Union City, New Jersey, June 27, 2016

Ray Machado, the founder and lead singer of Máxima Alerta, was born in Santa Clara, Cuba, a busy city in the center of Cuba where reggaeton music gained popularity among the young, often marginalized and vilified youth culture (and where it is sometimes spelt "regueton" or "reggae town"), and merged with local influences to be called Cubaton. Machado graduated in 1997 as an audio engineer from the Instituto Cubano de Radio y Television in Havana. He worked as a concert sound engineer for acts including Cándido Fabre, Paulo FG, and El Chispa y sus Cómplices. He founded the Cubaton fusion band Máxima Alerta on June 20, 1999 in Santa Clara, serving as lead singer, musical director, and composer of most of the songs for the group. For four years Machado (a.k.a. "El Italiano") and his bandmates, Francisco Pantaleón (a.k.a. "El Panta") and Yoslin Aleman (a.k.a. "Mister Show") practiced together, working to develop their unique sound and build a following. Marcos Daniel Prado, a singer trained at the Fagot school, joined them in 2002. In 2003 Máxima Alerta debuted on national radio and television stations with two songs, "Echar pa' lante" and "Adegüello 1895", both of which attained national popularity.

According to Machado, hip hop began to gain popularity in Cuba in the 1980s, though rap was forbidden by the Cuban government because it was feared that it could be used for counter-revolutionary activities. Fidel Castro changed his mind when hip hop became popular among the Cuban youth, especially among black Cubans. In time, the Castro government came to see rap music artists as potential new revolutionaries, provided that they produced lyrics that cast the Cuban Revolution in a positive light. While still in Cuba, Machado touched upon this by saying, "We don't rap about the political situation. Rap is a special way to talk about the situation in the country. On Cuba there are about 300 hip hop groups; and they all take a different line. We like more commercial raps. We want our raps to also be heard outside of Cuba. Cuban hip hop and reggaeton is strong enough to get success outside of Cuba just like what happens today with son and salsa."

During a concert in Cumanayagua, the band met Flipper, a member of the reggaeton band Cubanito 20.02, who told them that the Cubanito label was looking for other groups. At a later anniversary concert for the Radio Taino program Cuba tonight, the band was noticed by the artistic director of the French record label Lusafrica, and arranged for the band's first CD, Llegaron los Alertas to be recorded at Silvio Rodríguez's Abdala Studios. It was released in April 2005. The album features such singles as "Echar pa'lante" ("Go Forward"), which mixes an old revolutionary ballad by Carlos Puebla about Che Guevara with hip hop and son Cubano; and "Machete", a crossover of Cuban rumba and salsa trumpets with a hip hop beat that centers on an old farmer cutting sugar cane with a machete. The album was nominated for Best Album Rap, Dance and Hip Hop at the Cubadisco awards festival. In 2009, the band's song "La Figura" ("Ay Lola"), which Maxima Alerta recorded with the Cuban reggaeton group Gente de Zona, rose to the top of the charts.

In 2011, Máxima Alerta released the CD Alertas para Todos, recorded and produced by Nando Pro in Havana. Six of the fourteen tracks on the album featured special guests Yulien Oviedo and Dante; Alexander Delgado y Randy Marcos; Sisto Llorente "El Indio". The CD also features a song dedicated Cuban baseball player and Olympic gold medalist Victor Mesa.

Around this same time, at the height of the band's popularity, Cuban government informed the band that a lyric in one of its songs, which mentioned "Cuban girls wanting American men," was incompatible with communist philosophy. Machado refused to modify the song, and the group was banned from performing for eight months. Machado, then 39, emigrated to the United States, where he applied for political asylum in 2011.

=== 2011 — present ===
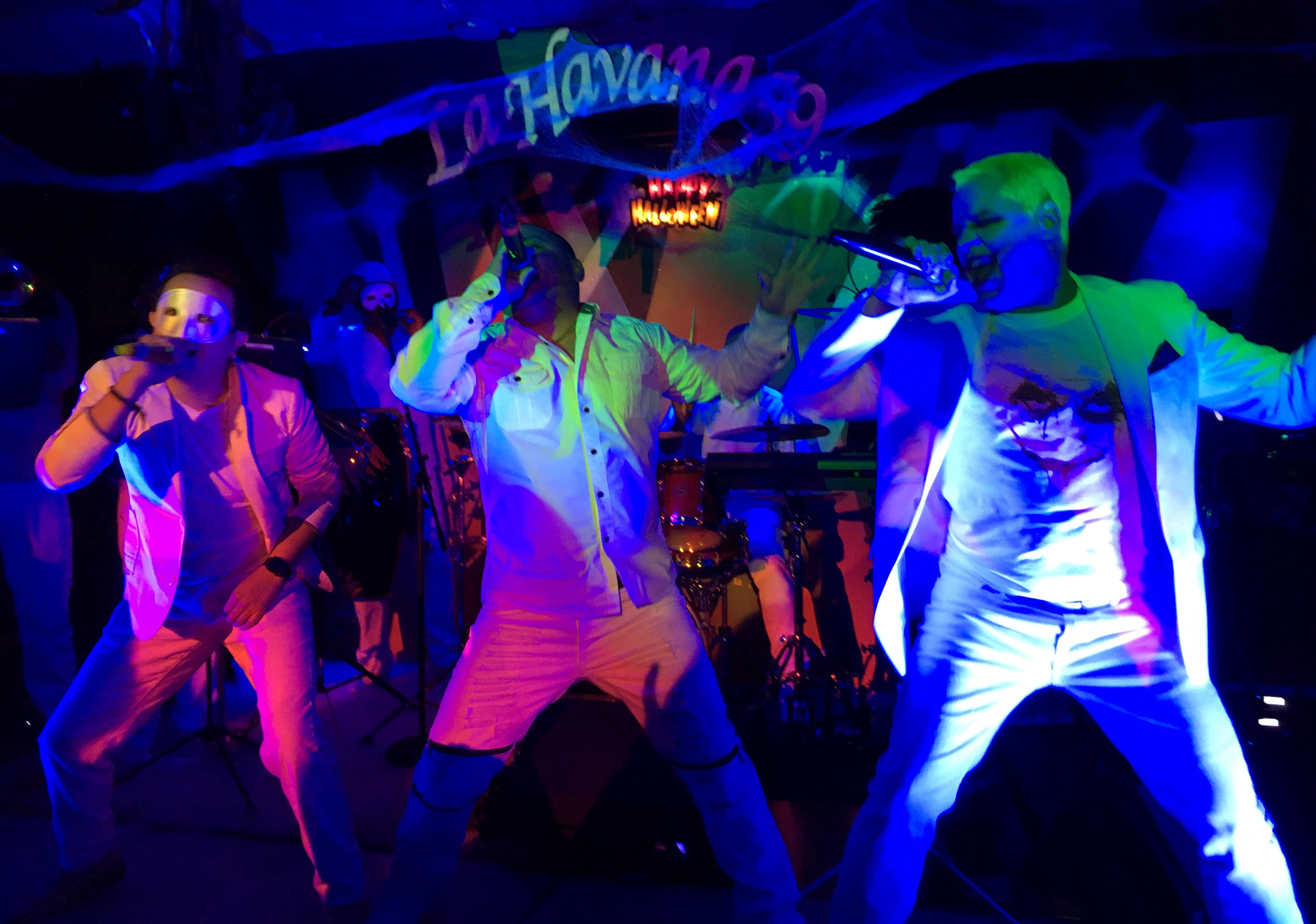
The band performing at La Havana 59 in Moonachie, New Jersey in 2017. From left to right: Claudio Lozano, band founder and lead singer Ray Machado, and Lucio Fernandez.

In the United States, Machado moved into a basement apartment with his father in Jersey City, New Jersey, serving as the building superintendent while also working in a factory. In late 2015 he moved to nearby West New York, and found work as a day laborer, and then as a sanitation truck driver for the Union City Department of Public Works, in order to support his wife and two daughters. Machado has commented on life in his adopted country by saying, "People say that I am the happiest garbage man they've ever see. And some ask me how I can do that kind of work. I tell them, I am proud and grateful to have a job by which I can support my family. How can I not be happy? I'm blessed. Listen, I live in the greatest country in the world. I have two beautiful daughters, and a loving wife. I love what I do. What else can I ask for?" Nonetheless, in regards to his music, he stated, "After four years of not performing, I thought my dream was gone."

After Machado's father died, he decided to reform Máxima Alerta. In October 2015, the band performed in two sold-out concerts in New York City with merengue singer Fernandito Villalona. In 2016, the band released the song "Vive la Vida", its first song recorded in the United States. In subsequent months, the group sold out concerts at Maxwell's in Hoboken, and another concert with Latin bachata singer Anthony Santos at Union City's Park Performing Arts Center. That same year, it played at the New York City venues Drom and The Bitter End, performed during the Cuban Parade of New Jersey, and made television appearances on stations including Telemundo and Univision. That same year, "Vive la Vida" was included in the first round of voting for the Latin Grammy Award for Best Urban Fusion.

In 2016, the band released the single "Que Viva USA", a tribute to its adopted home country. The video for the single, released in October that year, was directed by Brandon Medina, and produced by Melu Films, the production company of actor/singer/filmmaker Lucio Fernandez, the Commissioner of Public Affairs in Union City, who also serves as the band's manager and one of its vocalists. Fernandez's wife, Megan, a dancer and instructor who appeared on America's Got Talent, appears as one of the dancers in it.

== Influences and style ==
The band is credited, along with the band Cubanito 20.02, of popularizing the Cuban form of reggaeton, or Cubaton, and is known for its incorporation of musical genres that include son Cubano, conga, cumbia, salsa, and merengue. It also incorporates musical styles and forms such as rap and ballads. Machado described Máxima Alerta's fusion of genres by saying, "We mix American hip hop with son, salsa, merengue, cumbia and reggae. Today, we call our music reggaeton." Compared to Cubanito 20.02, Máxima Alerta is influenced more by traditional Cuban music than by Jamaican music. The band's music pays homage to Elio Revé, the singer of the changüí, which, like son Cubano, originated from the Oriente Province, the eastern part of Cuba.

Machado comments however, on the necessity of judiciousness when merging styles so that they complement one another, saying, "It's not easy to mix hip hop with Cuban music. You have to listen carefully to see if it stays in the same line with the Cuban clave, the basis of our traditional music. You cannot copy gratuitously another style. There are rappers who try to imitate American gangsta style. That's ridiculous because there are no gangs here. Others' raps deal with living in the ghetto and working in the sugar industry as well as about going to the beach, parties, beautiful women and the beauty of Cuba."

== Discography ==
=== Albums ===
- Llegaron Los Alertas
- Alerta Para Todos (2011)
- Vive La Vida (2015)

==== Guest appearances ====
- Cuban Reggaeton CD (2009)
- Oro: Lo Nuevo y lo Mejor CDs (2012)

=== Singles ===
- "Llegaron Los Alertas"

== Awards and achievements ==
- Named Latin Group of the Year by Communitarian Media Network
- Premio ARTE 2017 award for Best Latin Band
- Named New Jersey's Best Latin Group by Cine & Novelas
- Union City Artist Award
- Final entry at the 2016 Latin Grammy Award for Best Urban Fusion
