= Park Performing Arts Center =

Park PAC
- Park Theatre
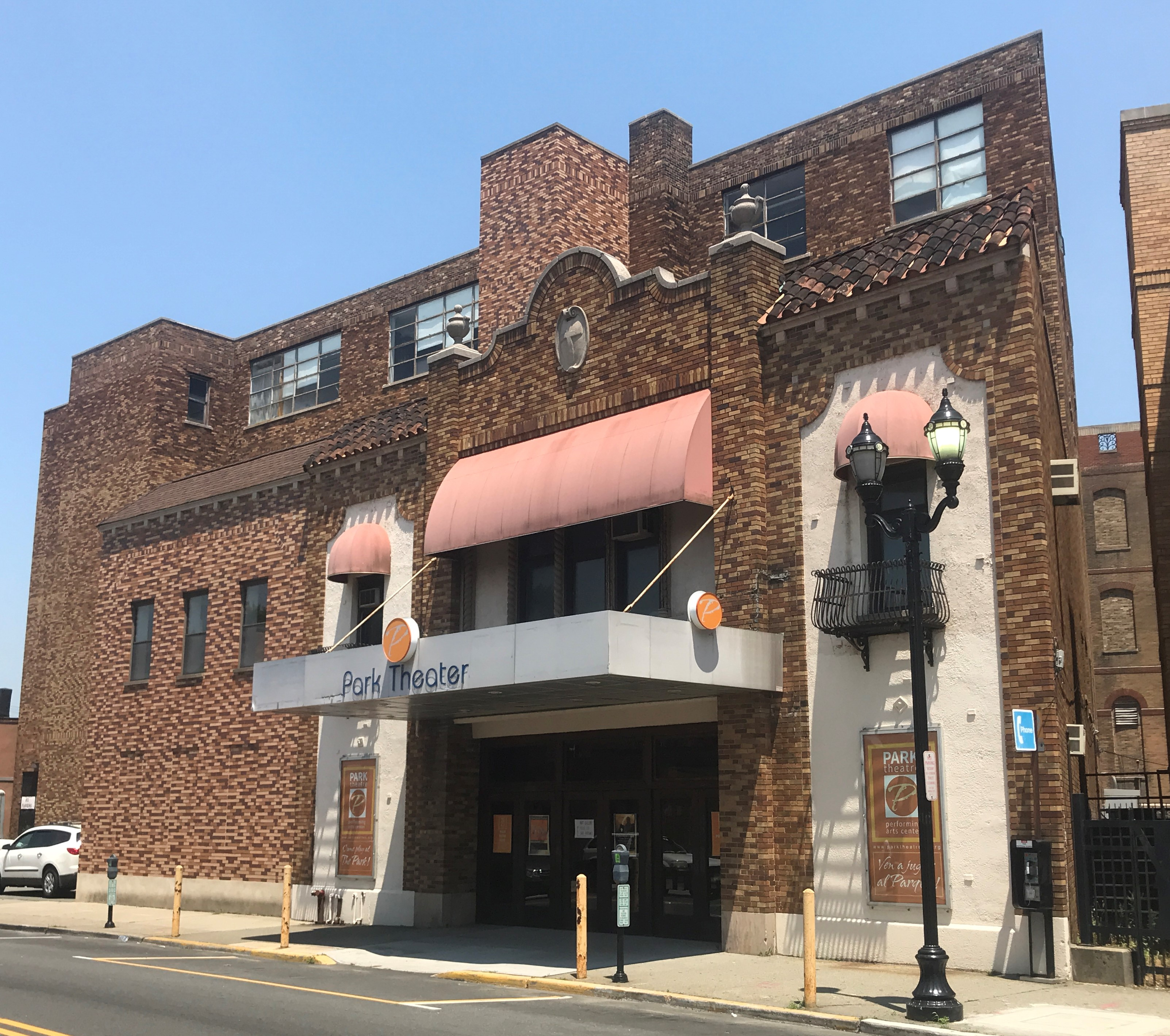
- Interactive map of Park PAC
- Address: 560 32nd Street; Union City, NJ; US
- Coordinates: 40.77389°N 74.03042°W
- Owner: Archdiocese of Newark
- Capacity: 1400 (est)

Construction
- Opened: 1931

The Park Performing Arts Center is a cultural center located at 32nd Street and Central Avenue in Union City, New Jersey, United States. Originally built by a church parish, it became a non-profit organization in 1983, and hosts appearances of local, national, and international artists as well as community events The center also houses a small museum dedicated to the craft of embroidery, gallery spaces, and supports programs offering classes in the performing and visual arts. The nation's longest running passion play production is performed annually at the center's main stage. The programming is often reflective of the cultural ties and influences of North Hudson County's Hispanic population.

== History ==
The Park Theater was built 1931 as an extension of the Holy Family Church complex by the Roman Catholic Archdiocese of Newark, under the guidance of Msgr. Joseph Grieff, reputed to have a taste for theater. Under his watch the German Catholic parish had originally built the church in 1887, which at the time was the only stone parish church between Jersey City and Fort Lee along the crest of the Hudson Palisades. The neo-Gothic building houses ornate stained glass pieces which were attributed to Innsbruck Art Glass Studio of Austria and were completely restored in 2008. The year after its completion the cornerstone was laid for the parish's new school, which housed a public hall, auditorium and dressing rooms.

The Park is one of few remaining of the early big theaters that once dotted the North Jersey theater landscape still in operation, as are Newark Symphony Hall and Loew's Jersey Theater. The centerpiece is its vaulted 1,400-seat proscenium theater, built in the atmospheric style. The three-manual, twenty-rank orchestral Möller organ includes two pipe chambers containing 1,390 pipes plus a 25-note chime and a 61-note Deagan Harp. After years of disuse, it was restored in 1991 and is now well-maintained. The complex also contains a small black box theater, exhibition spaces, classrooms and rehearsal auditorium. To the dismay of some, the marquee was replaced in 2010, citing irreparable damage, though portions have been incorporated into its replacement.

The Performing Arts Center was established in 1983 with the creation of a non-profit organization. While the building is still owned by the archdiocese, there is a long-term lease with the non-profit. The arts center was originally run by the initiator of the project, Kevin Ashe, pastor of Holy Family at the time, who felt the resource in the community was being underused. In 1991, it began operating as a full-time arts organization. When later there was a controversy with funding denial by the New Jersey State Council on the Arts, some claimed that there was a conflict with concept of separation between church and state. Nonetheless, the organization does receive some council funding for education and staff. Art for the Park is an annual fundraiser that includes exhibitions and performances.

While the church and rectory are listed on the New Jersey Register of Historic Places, the theater and other buildings are not. In 2019, the theater in its annual list of the 10 most endangered historic places in the state, due to the rapid deterioration of the building, which aside from a few tenants who live on the upper floor where converted classrooms were located, is mostly unused. The Archdiocese of Newark, which owns the property, expressed the possibility of selling it, provided it be to an organization willing to restore building and convert it into a viable entertainment venue similar to Loew's Jersey Theatre in Jersey City.

By the late 2010s, the Theatre had fallen into disuse and required restoration. A refurbishment project headed by John Lant was completed in 2020, with the intention of the renewing the center's status as an active venue for the arts. On March 6–8 of that year, a grand re-opening of the Park Art Gallery, an open house featuring live musical performances and tours of the theatre, a sneak preview of the refurbishment initiative, and a ribbon cutting ceremony held on March 7. A few days later, however, the theater was temporarily closed as a result of the COVID-19 pandemic. It reopened in October.

== Performances and exhibits ==
=== "America's Oberammergau" ===
A passion play is a theatrical production presented during Lent depicting of the last days of Jesus Christ. The traditional Oberammergau Passion Play in Bavaria has taken place since 1634. At the turn of the 20th century, much of North Hudson, New Jersey was populated by German-speaking immigrants who had established Catholic parishes, and by the mid-1910s two of the churches had begun annual presentations of a passion play, which sometimes led to friendly rivalry. Similar to the German version, the production were made possible by volunteers of the extended community.

One production was sponsored by St Joseph's Church on Central Avenue in what was then West Hoboken (now the southern half of Union City). It was called "Veronica's Veil", in reference to the Veil of Veronica, and one of the Stations of the Cross. Opening in 1915, this production was billed as America's Passion Play, and ran until 1999.

The other production was created under the auspices of Holy Family in what was then Union Hill (the northern half of town) and has been presented annually since 1915, making it the longest-running passion play in the United States. The show has been presented at the Park since it was completed, leading to the nickname America's Oberammergau.

While some consider passion plays to have been historically anti-semitic, the Park's production has adapted to modern times. The 1997 show caused a stir when a black actor, Desi Arnaz Giles, was cast to play the part of Jesus Christ, sharing the role with a production veteran. This led to derogatory phone calls to the theater, a death threat left on an answering machine, and subsequently, cancellations by five tour groups. The theater also received hundreds of calls and faxes from around the world expressing support, ticket sales improved by 20%, his performance garnered a standing ovation, and Giles played the role the following season.

=== The Cultural Thread/El Hilo ===
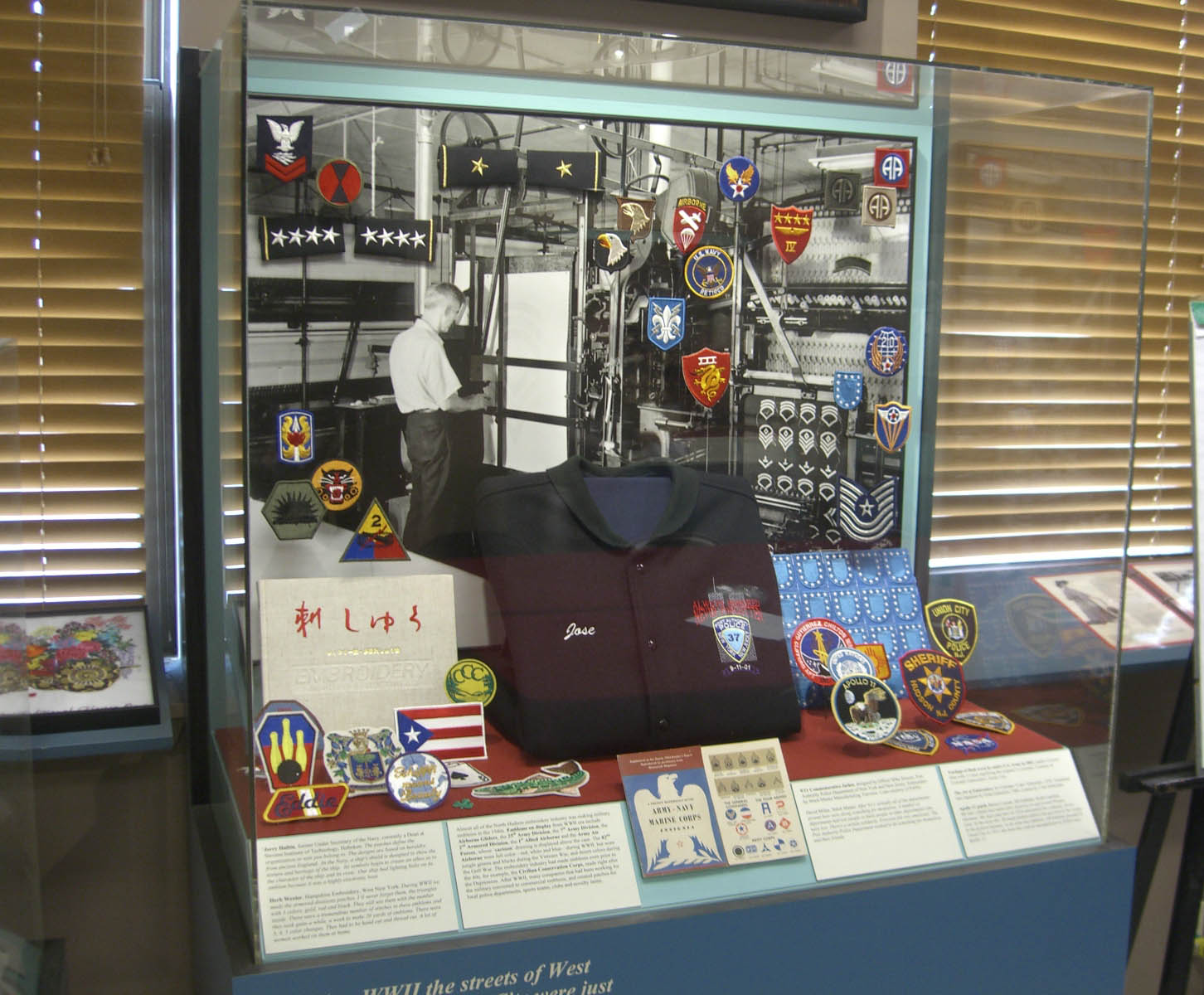
Vitrine display of work produced in the Embroidery Capital of the United States

The Cultural Thread/El Hilo is an exhibition about the craft of embroidery and lace-making. The towns in North Hudson and nearby communities such as Fairview have, since the turn of the 20th century, been the center of the industry, the Embroidery Capital of the United States, producing more than 70% of US output. Originally introduced by German and Swiss immigrants who imported the craft from their homelands, the industry expanded after the introduction of the Schiffli machine by Reiner and Sons in Weehawken in 1902. The manufacture of embroidery in the region steadily provided employment to the various waves of immigrants, the last from Central and South America until the embroidery industry declined in the area in the 1990s.

=== Stage ===
Since its inception the center has presented a variety of performances, ranging from Broadway shows, music concerts, Off-Broadway productions, recitals, film screenings, variety shows, talent showcases, and community celebrations. The resident theater company Hudson Exploited has used the 32nd Street Playhouse, the black box theater of the center, since 1992. Three Kings Day is celebrated annually. Hudson Theater Works, a company dedicated to plays geared toward "the working people" of Hudson County, became the new resident company of the center in February 2011, it first presentation a reading of Of Mice and Men.

Among the many musicians who have performed at the Park are Johnny Cash, Paquito D'Rivera, The Clancy Brothers, Maynard Ferguson, and El Gran Combo de Puerto Rico. Dance groups have included José Greco, Nai-Ni Chen Dance Company, Ballet Folklórico de México, Maria Benitez Spanish Dance Company, Hispanic Flamenco Ballet of Miami, and the Cuban-American band Máxima Alerta.

The theater has also been used for film and video shoots and screenings. In 1986 the bands Aerosmith and Run-D.M.C. filmed the groundbreaking video for their single "Walk This Way" at the theater, In the same year performance artist Laurie Anderson filmed Home of the Brave. Comedian George Carlin recorded his album What Am I Doing in New Jersey? and performance for the HBO special in 1988. The New Jersey City University–based Black Maria Film Festival has screened films at the venue.

=== Visual arts ===
Along with the passion play, another long-running event at the Park was the Multi-Arts Festival, which first took place in 1981. It was initiated by Agnes Dauerman, a Union Hill High School art teacher, who also organized the festival until her retirement in 2005. The festival is a forum for students and others in the community to celebrate artistic and cultural diversity, and includes workshops, exhibitions, and performances. It was held at the PPAC until 2010, when it moved to the Union City Performing Arts Center.

In addition to the embroidery museum, the Multi-Arts Festival, and Art for the Park, the center also hosts other exhibitions, presenting work of local artists, some of national or international renown. Since 2004, a group show called NoHu Vision has presented work by those living in NoHu, or North Hudson.

On September 30, 2020, a new art gallery called The Gallery at the Park opened at the newly renovated theater. On display at the time was a re-opened exhibit of paintings by New Jersey artist Cara London, which had previously opened in March, before the COVID-19 pandemic forced the theater's closure.

== See also ==
- Monastery and Church of Saint Michael the Archangel
- Schuezten Park
- Stanley Theater
