= Lucio Fernandez =

Cuban-American politician and entertainer

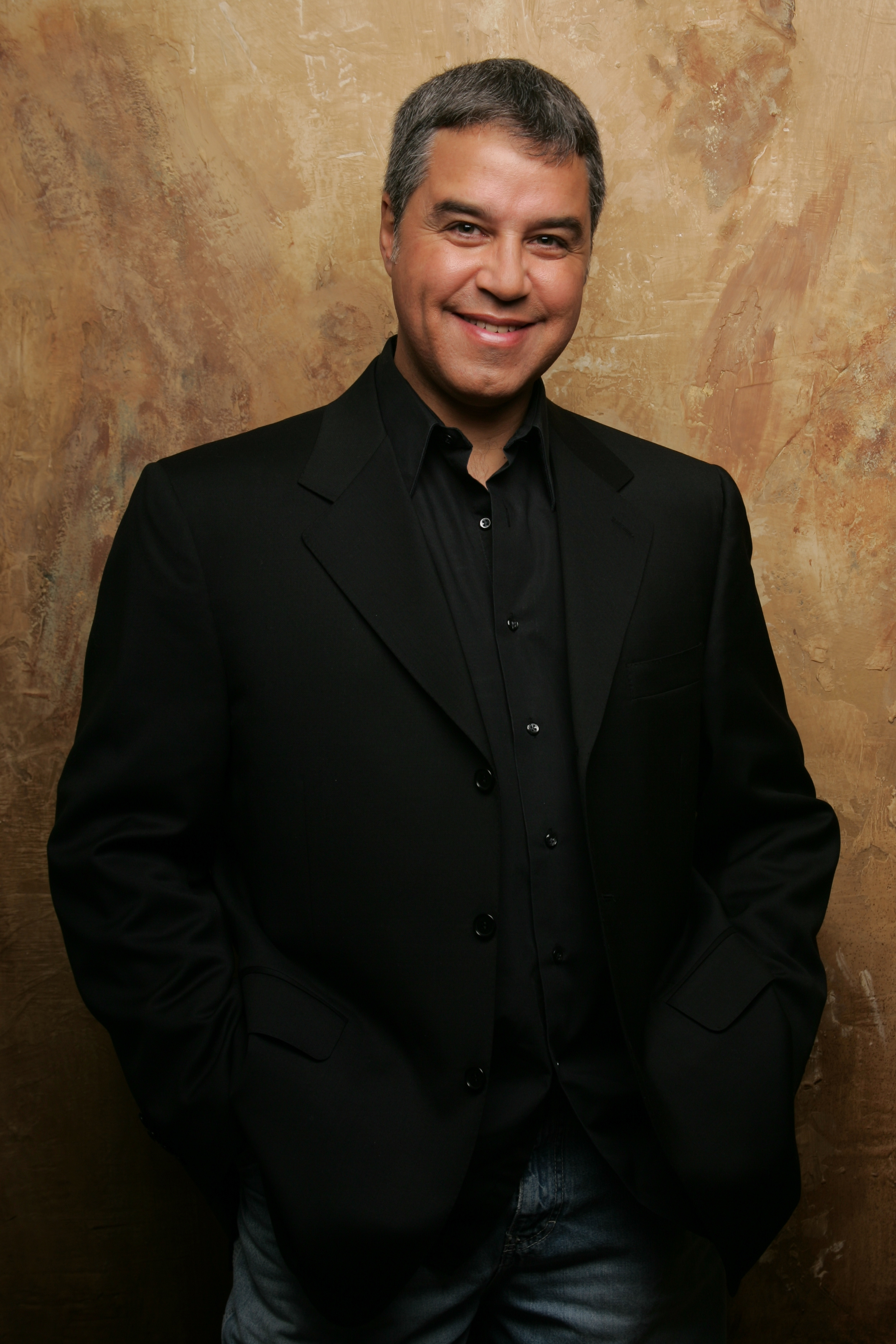

Commissioner of Public Affairs in Union City, New Jersey
- Incumbent
- Assumed office 2006

Personal details
- Born: Havana, Cuba
- Party: Democratic
- Occupation: Singer, actor, dancer, playwright, screenwriter, producer, film director

Lucio P. Fernandez is a Cuban-American politician and entertainer, who serves as the Commissioner of Public Affairs in Union City, New Jersey, where he serves under Mayor Brian P. Stack. He is also an artist, author, singer, actor, dancer, playwright, screenwriter, producer and film director who has been credited with being instrumental in reviving the arts in Union City.

== Early life ==
Lucio Fernandez was born in Havana, Cuba, to Lucio Pablo Gallardo and Herminia Fernandez, a seamstress. He has a brother Frank and two sisters, Anna and Pabla. Lucio and his family lived in poverty, a situation made worse by the fact that Lucio Pablo was a political prisoner. Years later, as a resident of Union City, New Jersey, where Cuban émigrés are common, Fernandez commented on these roots thus:

I'm as Cuban as a cheeseburger. But I know the history. My father and stepfather were both political prisoners. My father had his hair and nails pulled out. For many people in Union City, there are such stories in their families.

When Herminia was forced to leave the country for political reasons, the family lived in Spain for one year before emigrating to the United States in the 1970s, when Fernandez was a child. They lived first in North Bergen, New Jersey, and then in Union City, New Jersey, where he grew up. After attending Union Hill High School, he studied at Rutgers University/Newark Campus, initially double majoring in engineering and business. According to Fernandez, he was strolling through the campus with a friend one day when they stopped at the Theater Department. After seeing the black box theater, Fernandez explains, "I knew right away that's where I wanted to be." Fernandez switched majors, and graduated with a bachelor's degree in Theater Arts. He later graduated from the Bobby Lewis Theatre Workshop in Manhattan.

== Career ==
=== Entertainment ===
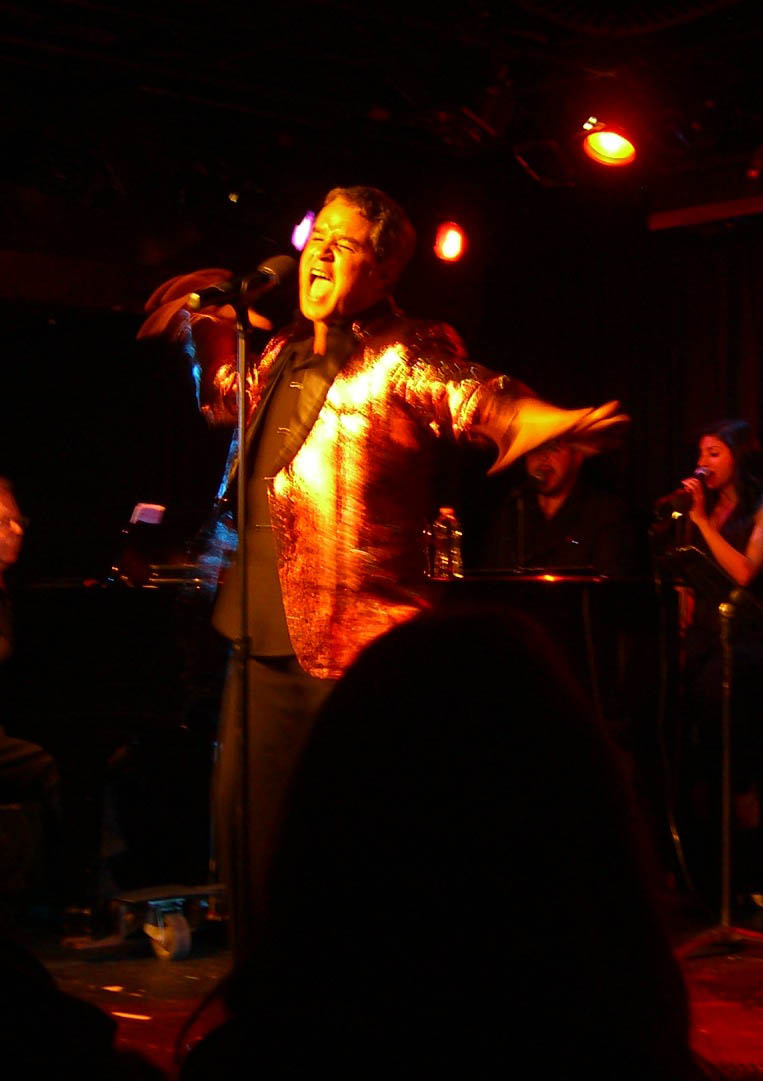
Fernandez performing in his autobiographical show, Lucio ... Less Cuban Than Ever

After graduating Fernandez began auditioning, sending out hundreds of photos and résumés every week, while simultaneously taking classes for singing, acting and dancing. He eventually began to get responses, and joined the Screen Actors Guild, Actors' Equity Association and the American Federation of Television and Radio Artists, with whom he did television and radio acting, including TV commercials and small roles in movies and soap operas. From 1985 to 1997, he toured nationally and internationally with productions of shows such as West Side Story, Jesus Christ Superstar, A Chorus Line and Guys and Dolls, working alongside performers such as Marc Anthony, Shirley MacLaine and Gene Kelly, and with directors and choreographers such as Jerome Robbins, Jerry Zaks, Michael Peters. In the course of his touring he traveled as far as Ecuador and Mexico City.

In September 2000 Fernandez and his wife, Megan, founded the non-profit Grace Theatre Workshop, which provides free lessons in various fields of the arts to children. It was named after its first home, Union City's Grace Episcopal Church's auditorium, where it began with seven students, but as of 2007 it is run out of Jose Marti Freshman Academy, where it serves approximately 120 children. In 2004 they founded their own film production company, MeLu Films.

In 2001 Fernandez began hosting the local access show Ensalada (Salad), a bilingual "man-on-the-street" show in which he asks people on the streets of Union City "hard-hitting social questions about life in the city".

Fernandez leads a Latin jazz band called CuJazz, which Fernandez, who enjoys producing free form poetry, says provides him a way to set his poems to music. In 2003 CuJazz released the independent album, Volver A Ti, which features eight tracks of covers and originals, including "Besame Mucho" and "Nuestro Olvido", for which Fernandez's vocals were praised by The Hudson Reporter.

In 2008 Fernandez produced an autobiographical stand-up comedy concert, The Cuban Kid, which focuses on his experiences as a native of Cuba growing up in New Jersey and dividing his time as a performer and an elected official. The show was written by Fernandez and his collaborator, Union City Historian Gerard Karabin, featured musical arrangements by Mark Goodman, and was directed by Fernandez's wife Megan. The show garnered Fernandez a nomination for a 2008 MAC Award and won him the 2009 ITRA Award for Best Performance Theatrical (Male).

In 2009, Fernandez and MeLu Films began production on Vampire in Union City, a surrealist, 48-minute-long independent art film, and the first theatrically released film set in and shot almost entirely in Union City. Written by Karabin, and produced, directed by and starring Fernandez, the film follows the quest of a demented man obsessed with death and the living dead as he roams Union City, and is based on the theme that big cities are more conducive to loneliness than small towns. It stars local artists, and uses Union City landmarks almost exclusively as shooting locations, such as St. John's Episcopal Church, and Hackensack Reservoir No. 2. (Only one location outside of the city, a property in North Bergen, was used for a cemetery scene in order to avoid disturbing a real cemetery.) Fernandez and Karabin hoped the film might inspire other filmmakers to consider Union City as a shooting location. The world premiere was held on September 3, 2010, at the Summit Quadplex on Summit Avenue, the first world premiere of a film in Union City. The film was later screened for general audiences at the Union City Performing Arts Center as part of Union City's Celebrate Art Month, an event Fernandez helped bring about. It was later screened at Mexico's Alberto Andrade Gallery Expo and Sweden's Hellsen Gallery, and aired by Cablevision during September 2010. It was made available for purchase at www.FilmBaby.com and at www.MeLuFilms.com.

In October 2011, Fernandez premiered his autobiographical stage show, Lucio ... Less Cuban Than Ever, at the Laurie Beechman Theater in Manhattan. Like his previous show, The Cuban Kid, Less Cuban Than Ever focuses on Fernandez's life as a Cuban-American, and the experience of being raised in the United States while maintaining roots in another country, but consists of Fernandez's signature comedy antics, interaction with audience members and singing show tunes rather than standup comedy. It was co-written by Fernandez and Karabin, directed by noted cabaret director Lenny Watts, and includes dancers and an eight-piece band of Broadway veterans led by Mark Goodman, a Broadway veteran who met Fernandez in 1996 during their run in West Side Story. The show sold out its original four engagements, and required a fifth show to be added.

In 2013 Fernandez starred in the play Till Death, a dark comedy that he began writing in 1985 while a student at Rutgers. The story was inspired by the "Latin Lover" philanderers he knew growing up, and asks the question, "What if you met the perfect woman, the woman of your dreams, the woman who had everything you ever wanted but couldn't find, and all she is interested in is seeing you suffer?" Fernandez plays Tony, a desperately delusional and suicidal man, tormented by nightmares and memories of women from his past. His co-star, Ruth Kavanagh, played a multi-faceted, ghost-like "perfect woman" who volunteers to help him kill himself, despite his persistent failed attempts to do so. The world premiere was held at The Producers' Club Theatre in Manhattan on November 20, 2013.

Fernandez produces his own TV show on Cablevision and Comcast, Live on Stage, which promotes local artists in the North Hudson County area, and also produces an entertainment newspaper called Sunlight News.

In 2016 Fernandez's production company Melu Films produced the video for "Que Viva USA", a single by Ray Machado's Cuban-American fusion band Máxima Alerta, on which Fernandez serves as one of the vocalists, as well as its manager. The video, directed by Brandon Medina, features his wife Megan as one of the dancers.

In 2017, Fernandez appeared in a supporting role in actor/director Pablo Yotich's Argentine action film Almas de Furia, which was screened at the Union City Performing Arts Center as part of the NoHu International Film Festival.

On May 19, 2018, Fernandez was one of three media figures inducted into Union City's Celia Cruz Park Walk of Fame, along with actor Eduardo Antonio, and Latin Grammy winner Amaury Gutierrez.

=== Politics ===
In the 1990s, while Fernandez was offering free performance classes for neighborhood children, he became friends with local civic leader Brian P. Stack. Though politics was not a lifelong vocation for Fernandez, and he had not previously supported any particular politician, he came to admire Stack's commitment to the betterment of the city and his interest in Fernandez's initiatives, as Stack was the only one who Fernandez says would return his phone calls.

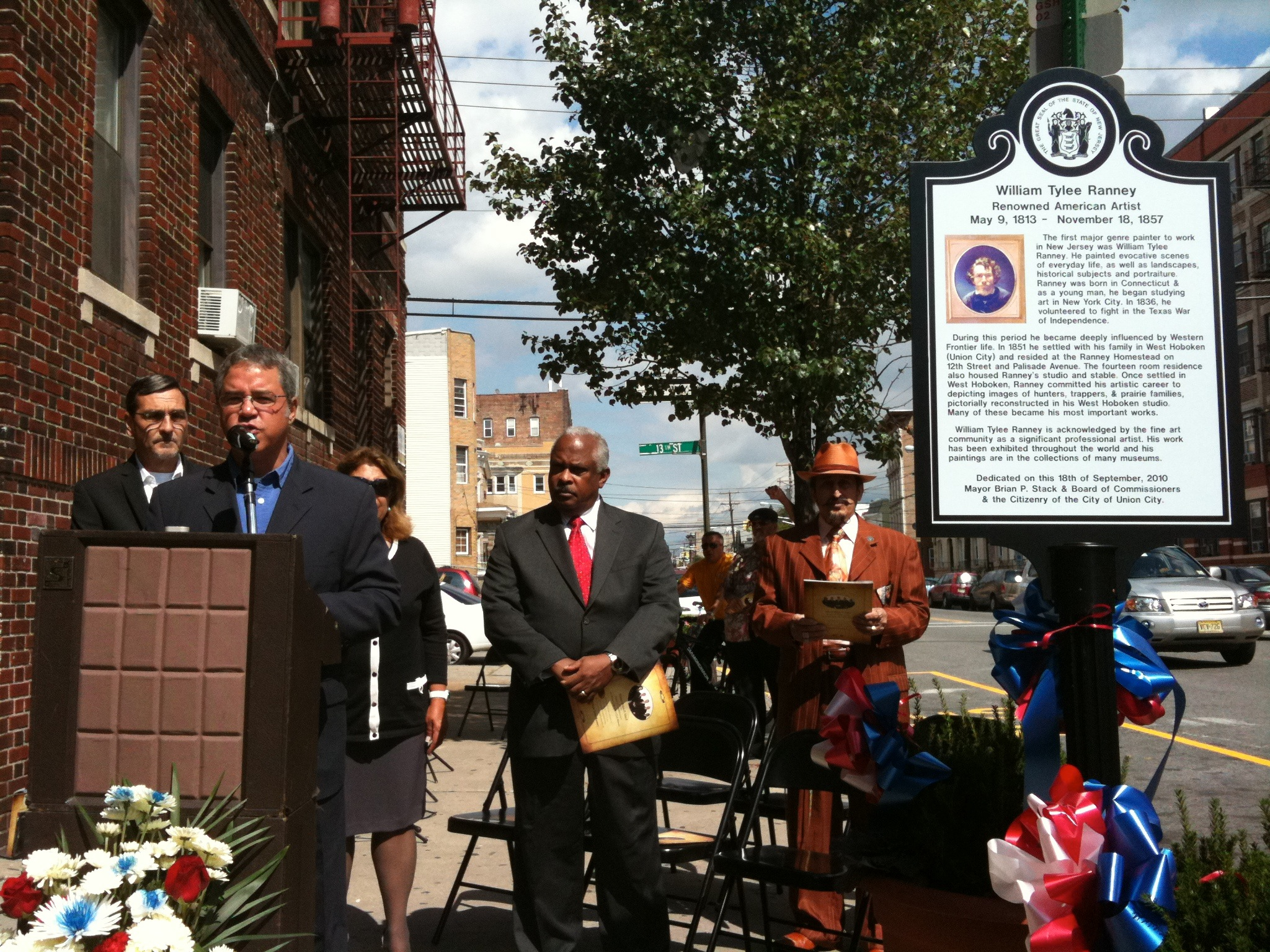
Fernandez (at podium) at the dedication ceremony of a historical marker for William Ranney at the location in Union City where Ranney's home once stood, one of many such markers that Fernandez has been instrumental in creating. Over Fernandez's right shoulder is his frequent collaborator, City Historian Gerard Karabin.

In the early 2000s, Fernandez was appointed a trustee of the board of education of the Union City School District and he was a past president of the Union City Day Care Center Board of Trustees. He also served on the Union City Redevelopment Board, and the Union City Public Library Friends. In 2003, Fernandez was made deputy director of Union City's Department of Public Affairs, his first formal position in assisting assist Stack with cultural and artistic endeavors in the city.

In late January 2004, Fernandez was named a commissioner of the Union City Housing Authority, a job he says he took because it would allow him to liaise with seniors and veterans, and address their needs. When asked about questions raised about why a performer by trade would accept a political position, Fernandez responded, "Everything to me is interconnected. Culture drives everything, and I know the culture." In 2006, he was elected Commissioner of Public Affairs.

The Hudson Reporter has credited him with being instrumental in reviving the arts in Union City during his time as Commissioner. In June 2010, to tie into Union City's 85th anniversary, Fernandez and Karabin published Union City in Pictures, a photo book documenting their home town's various locations. That same year Fernandez was involved in the creation of the Union City Plaza of the Arts on Bergenline Avenue between 30th and 31st Streets, which opened in December 2010 as a venue for artists to congregate and showcase their work. The location, which sees copious traffic to and from Midtown Manhattan, was chosen in order to showcase the city in a positive light to commuters, and so that the plaza could represent fine arts alongside the adjacent Pietro Di Donato Plaza and Celia Cruz Plaza, which represent literature and music, respectively.

Fernandez oversaw the construction and curating of the William V. Musto Cultural Center, which opened in 2011, and with Karabin, spearheaded a program that has dedicated several historic markers around the city, which Fernandez hopes could eventually be used as a tour guide.

In 2012, Fernandez, wanting to increase the city's honoring of local artists, produced the first-ever Union City Artist Awards, an annual red carpet event that honors multiple artists in the visual and the performing arts, and others who contribute to the city's culture.

On April 20, 2018, Union City's Performing Arts Center hosted the official premiere of Union City, U.S.A., a documentary on the city's history and culture. It was written, directed, and produced by Fernandez, who began research for the film in 2008. Fernandez and city historian Gerard Karabin conducted interviews with numerous past and current residents of the city for the film.

== Personal life ==
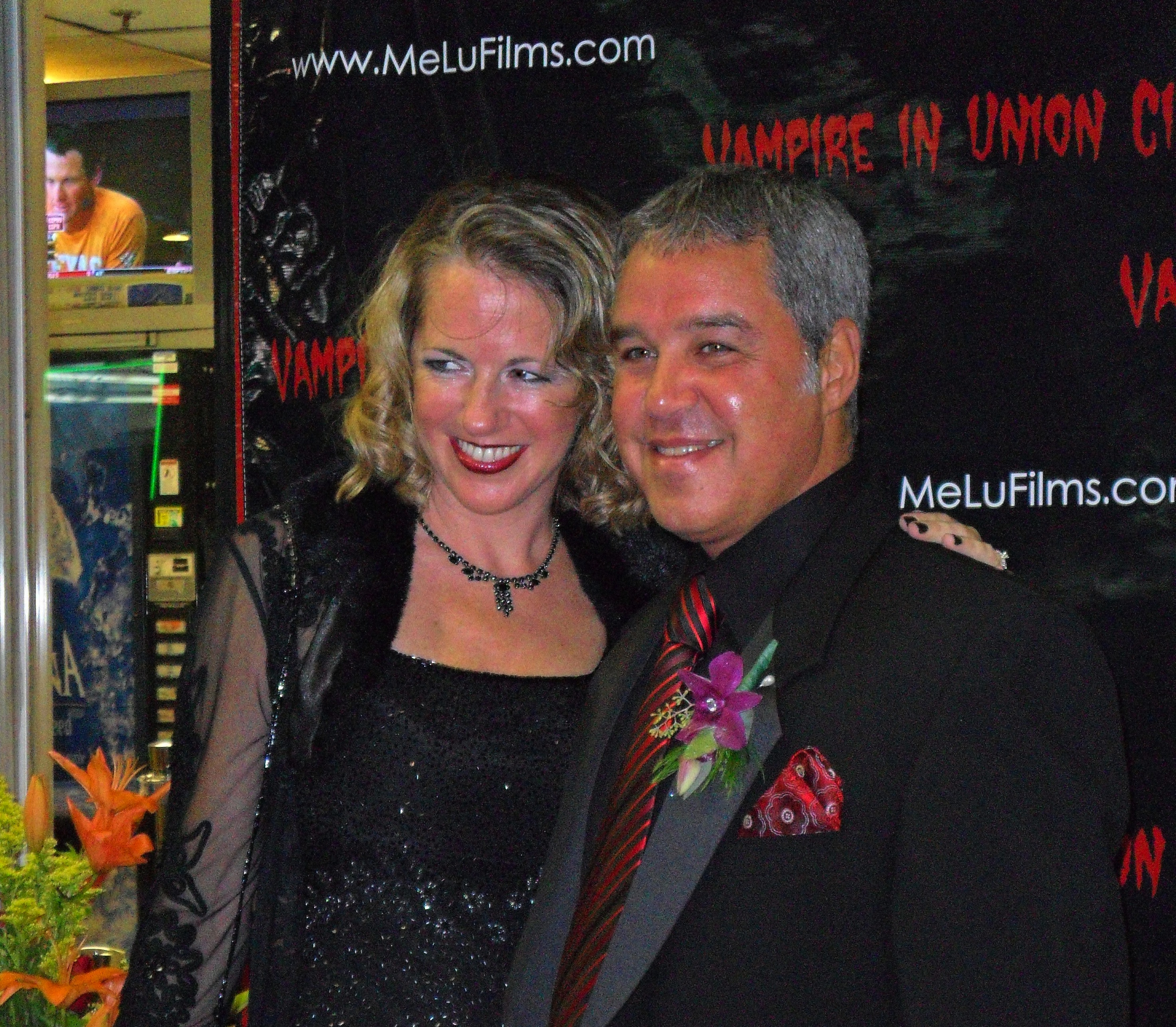
Fernandez with his wife, Megan, at the 2010 premiere of his film, Vampire in Union City

Fernandez's mother Herminia died in 1995, and as of 2009, his father and siblings reside in Florida.

Fernandez met his future wife, Megan, one night in 1997 while riding a bus back from Manhattan. Fernandez recounts, "I was about to go back on tour with West Side Story but I decided not to", and he ended up staying in Union City. They married in 2005, and have a son, Ryan, born January 29, 2013. Megan is an actress/singer/dancer/choreographer who has appeared with her troupe, Tap Ole Dance Company, on the reality television program America's Got Talent. The two have also performed dance routines in public.

In addition to his aforementioned artistic activities, Fernandez also enjoys painting and photography, snorkeling, horseback riding, and hiking. He enjoys modern jazz and the music of Frank Sinatra and Dean Martin. He has studied karate and is a fan of the New York Yankees.

== Awards and nominations ==
=== Awards ===
- 2009 ITRA Award for Best Performance Theatrical (Male) (for The Cuban Kid)
- 2013 Premio ARTE Award for Outstanding Actor (for Busco Amigo)
- 2013 ATI Award for Best Actor (for Cuba: Punto X)
- 2014 ATI Award for Best Actor (for Till Death)
- 2014 ACE Award for Outstanding Career in Theatre
- 2018 Induction into Union City's Celia Cruz Park Walk of Fame

=== Nominations ===
- 2008 MAC Award nomination (for The Cuban Kid)

== Discography ==
- Volver A Ti (2003)
- Lucio Fernandez: Poetry (2006)
- Enamorado (2010)
- American Mambo (2013)
