= Excelsior Engine Co. No. 2 Firehouse =

Building in West New York, New Jersey

- Excelsior Engine Co. No. 2 Firehouse – Exempt Firemen Association Headquarters
- U.S. National Register of Historic Places
- New Jersey Register of Historic Places
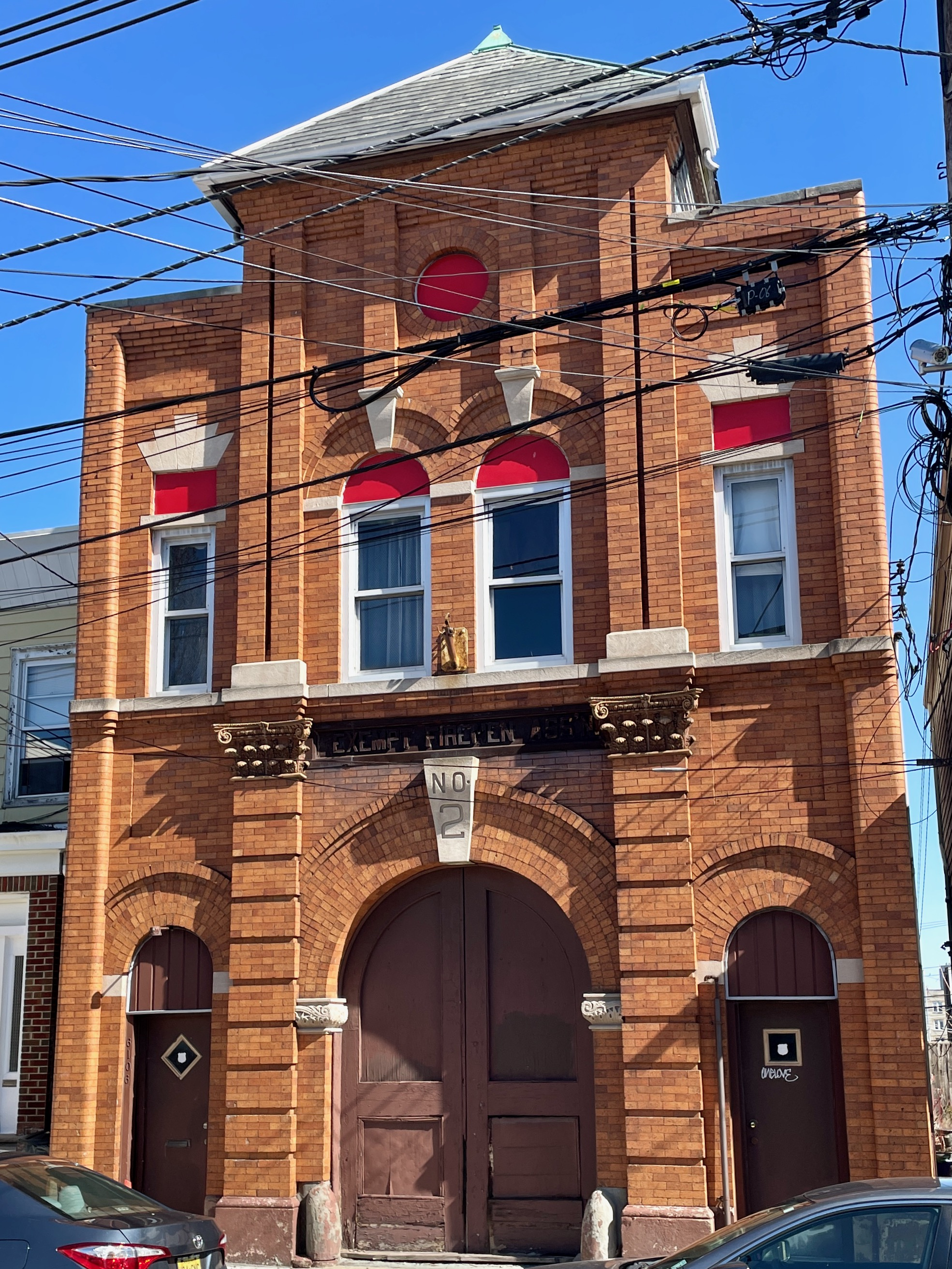

- Location within Hudson County, New Jersey Location within New Jersey Location within the United States
- Location: 6106 Polk Street, West New York, New Jersey
- Coordinates: 40°47′27.7″N 74°1′2.3″W
- Built: 1897
- Architect: Robert C. Dixon Jr., William Mayer Jr.
- Architectural style: Romanesque Revival
- NRHP reference No.: 100007991
- NJRHP No.: 5380

Significant dates
- Added to NRHP: August 12, 2022
- Designated NJRHP: June 27, 2022

The Excelsior Engine Co. No. 2 Firehouse is a historic former fire station built in 1897 and located at 6106 Polk Street in the town of West New York in Hudson County, New Jersey, United States. It was later known as the Exempt Firemen Association Headquarters. The building was added to the National Register of Historic Places on August 12, 2022, for its significance in architecture and social history. It was listed in 2017 as one of the state's 10 most endangered historic places by Preservation New Jersey.

== History and description ==
The two-story brick fire station was built in 1897, designed by architect Robert C. Dixon Jr. with Romanesque Revival architecture, for the Excelsior Engine Company No. 2 volunteer fire company of West New York. The design included Corinthian capitals made with terra cotta. The completion of the building was celebrated with a parade and banquet on October 23, 1897. In 1915, the town disbanded volunteer fire companies and created paid companies. The fire station was considered obsolete for motorized fire engines. By 1916, the Association of Exempt Firemen of West New York had acquired the building for use as their headquarters. In 1923, they hired architect William Mayer Jr. to renovate and expand the building.

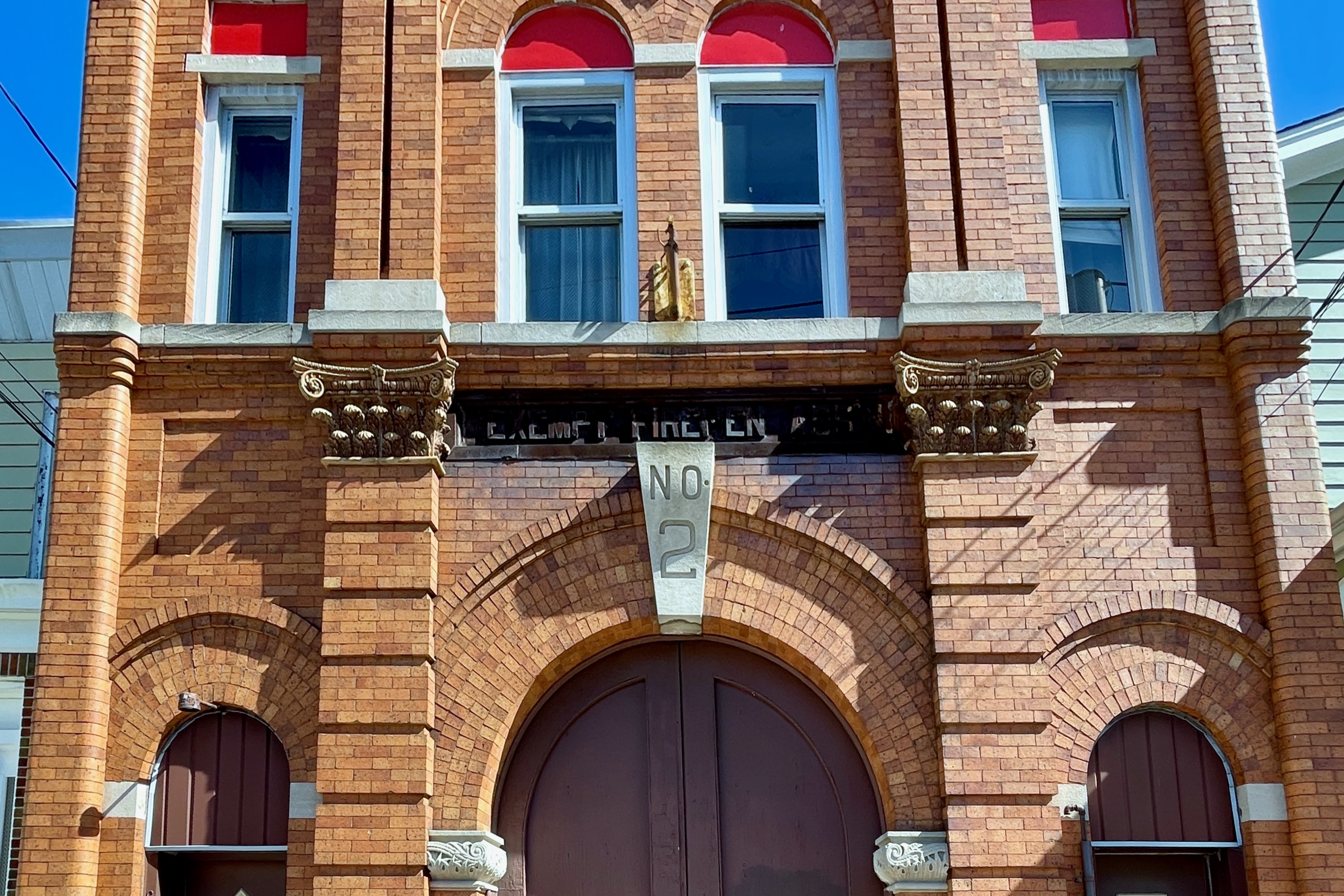
Detail view of the facade

== See also ==
- National Register of Historic Places listings in Hudson County, New Jersey
