= West New York, New Jersey =

Town in Hudson County, New Jersey, US

West New York
- Town
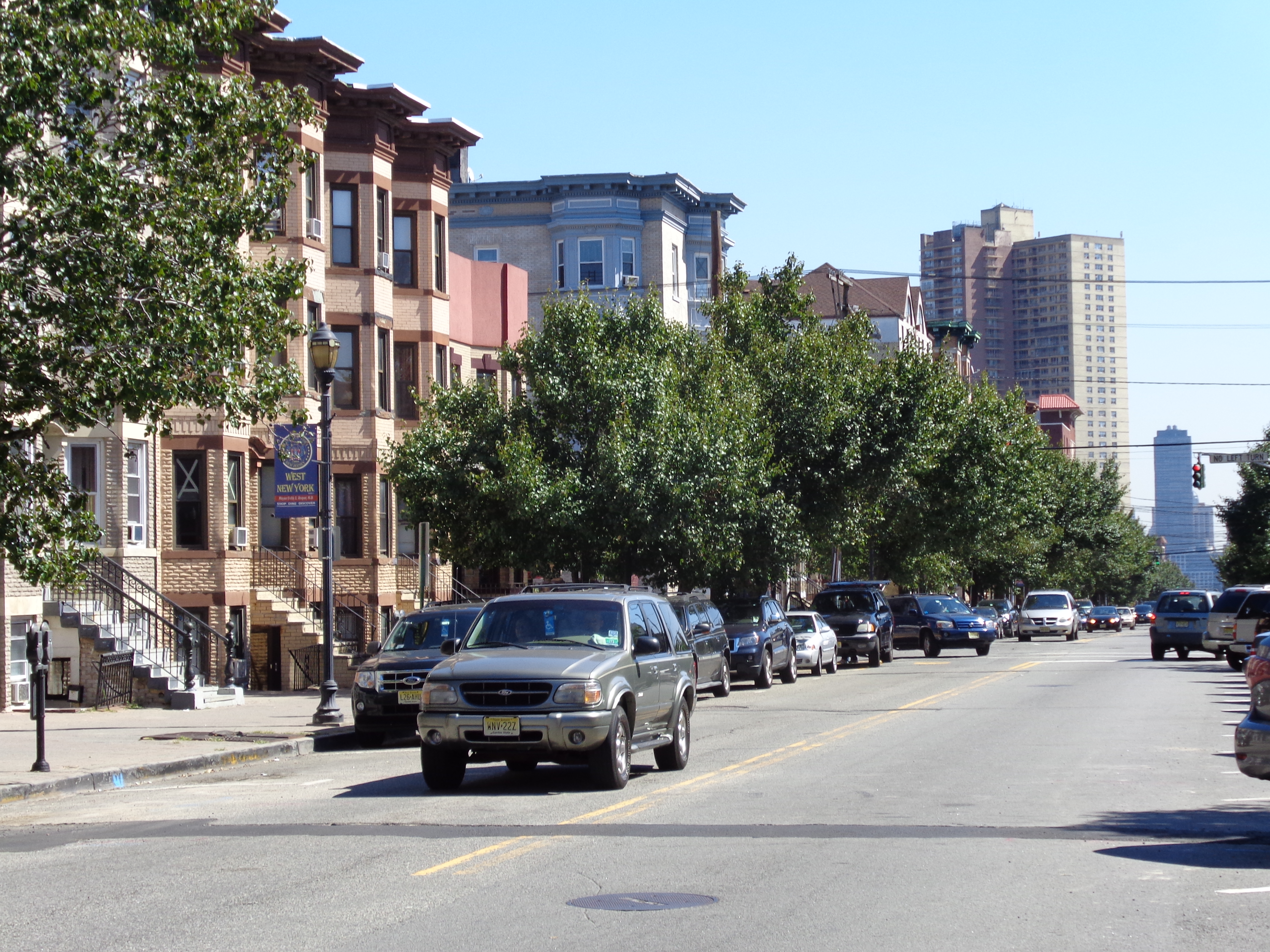
- 60th Street in West New York

- Seal
- Interactive map of West New York
- Location in Hudson County Location in New Jersey Location in the United States
- Coordinates: 40.786032°N 74.009507°W
- Country: United States
- State: New Jersey
- County: Hudson
- Incorporated: July 8, 1898

Government
  - Type: Walsh Act
  - Body: Board of Commissioners
  - Mayor: Albio Sires (term ends May 15, 2027)
  - Administrator: Luis Baez
  - Municipal clerk: Adelinny Plaza

Area
  - Total: 1.32 sq mi (3.42 km^{2})
  - Land: 1.00 sq mi (2.58 km^{2})
  - Water: 0.33 sq mi (0.85 km^{2}) 25.11%
  - Rank: 466th of 565 in state 8th of 12 in county
- Elevation: 151 ft (46 m)

Population (2020)
  - Total: 52,912
  - Estimate (2023): 50,754
  - Rank: 770th in country (as of 2022); 37th of 565 in state 6th of 12 in county
  - Density: 53,231.4/sq mi (20,552.8/km^{2})
  - Rank: 3rd of 565 in state 3rd of 12 in county
- Time zone: UTC−05:00 (Eastern (EST))
  - Summer (DST): UTC−04:00 (Eastern (EDT))
- ZIP Code: 07093
- Area code: 201
- FIPS code: 3401779610
- GNIS feature ID: 0885438
- Website: www.westnewyorknj.org

West New York is a town in the northern part of Hudson County, in the U.S. state of New Jersey, situated upon the New Jersey Palisades. As of the 2020 United States census, the town's population was 52,912, an increase of 3,204 (+6.4%) from the 2010 census count of 49,708, which in turn reflected an increase of 3,940 (+8.6%) from the 45,768 counted in the 2000 census. The Census Bureau's Population Estimates Program calculated that the city's population was 51,981 in 2022.

With more than 52,800 inhabitants per square mile (20,400/km^{2}) of land according to the 2010 census, West New York was the second-most densely populated municipality in the United States, among places with a population above 50,000, behind neighboring Union City.

== History ==
West New York was incorporated as a town by an act of the New Jersey Legislature on July 8, 1898, replacing Union Township, based on the results of a referendum held three days earlier. West New York underwent a massive growth at the beginning of the 20th century, driven by development of textile industries that made North Hudson the "Embroidery Capital of the United States".

The town was populated mainly with Italian Americans and German Americans. Throughout the 1960s, West New York had an influx of Cuban émigrés to the area, leading it to once being called Havana on the Hudson; the city has a majority Hispanic population.

High-rise apartments, some of which place among the tallest buildings in North Hudson, were built along Boulevard East, adding to the population of the town and giving it one of the highest population densities in the country.

Since the 1980s, the Hudson Waterfront, which the Weehawken Terminal had been a part of, has been redeveloped from an industrial to a residential and recreational area, for instance, with the creation of the Hudson River Waterfront Walkway.

== Geography ==
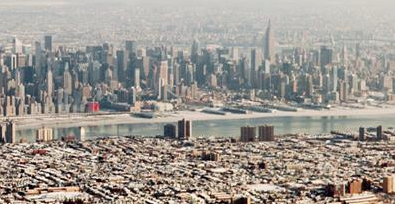
The Hudson River and Manhattan skyline seen from the west

According to the United States Census Bureau, the town had a total area of 1.33 square miles (3.44 km^{2}), including 0.99 square miles (2.58 km^{2}) of land and 0.33 square miles (0.86 km^{2}) of water (25.11%).

The ZIP Code for West New York is 07093. West New York is part of the New York metropolitan area and is at the heart of the North Hudson, New Jersey, region. West New York is bordered on the north by Guttenberg, on the east by the Hudson River, on the south by Union City and Weehawken, and on the west by North Bergen.

West New York is one of North Hudson's communities atop The Palisades above the Hudson River, and home to the highest point in the county. Its Hudson Waterfront has been known as Bulls Ferry since before the American Revolutionary War. Bergenline Avenue is its main commercial thoroughfare, while the wide two-way 60th Street is a major cross-town thoroughfare, and site of Town Hall. More than half of U.S. Presidents have streets bearing their name in the town.

The town borders the municipalities of Guttenberg, North Bergen, Union City and Weehawken in Hudson County; and the New York City borough of Manhattan across the Hudson River.

== Demographics ==
Historical population
| Census | Pop. | Note | %± |
|---|---|---|---|
| 1900 | 5,267 | | — |
| 1910 | 13,560 | | 157.5% |
| 1920 | 29,916 | | 120.6% |
| 1930 | 37,107 | | 24.0% |
| 1940 | 39,439 | | 6.3% |
| 1950 | 37,683 | | −4.5% |
| 1960 | 35,547 | | −5.7% |
| 1970 | 40,627 | | 14.3% |
| 1980 | 39,194 | | −3.5% |
| 1990 | 38,125 | | −2.7% |
| 2000 | 45,768 | | 20.0% |
| 2010 | 49,708 | | 8.6% |
| 2020 | 52,912 | | 6.4% |
| 2023 (est.) | 50,754 | ▼ | −4.1% |
Population sources: 1800–1920; 1900–1910 1910–1930; 1940–2000 2000; 2010 2020

One of 41 municipalities statewide where a majority of residents do not speak English as their primary language, Spanish is spoken at home by more than half of the residents of West New York, according to data from the United States Census Bureau's 2012-2016 American Community Survey data. The town had 83.6% of residents not speaking English as their dominant language, the second highest in the state.

=== Racial and ethnic composition ===
West New York town, New Jersey – Racial and ethnic composition Note: the US Census treats Hispanic/Latino as an ethnic category. This table excludes Latinos from the racial categories and assigns them to a separate category. Hispanics/Latinos may be of any race.
| Race / Ethnicity (NH = Non-Hispanic) | Pop 2000 | Pop 2010 | Pop 2020 | % 2000 | % 2010 | % 2020 |
|---|---|---|---|---|---|---|
| White alone (NH) | 7,088 | 6,571 | 6,649 | 15.49% | 13.22% | 12.57% |
| Black or African American alone (NH) | 658 | 873 | 1,234 | 1.44% | 1.76% | 2.33% |
| Native American or Alaska Native alone (NH) | 43 | 39 | 51 | 0.09% | 0.08% | 0.10% |
| Asian alone (NH) | 1,292 | 2,904 | 3,745 | 2.82% | 5.84% | 7.08% |
| Native Hawaiian or Pacific Islander alone (NH) | 6 | 3 | 8 | 0.01% | 0.01% | 0.02% |
| Other race alone (NH) | 100 | 127 | 447 | 0.22% | 0.26% | 0.84% |
| Mixed race or Multiracial (NH) | 543 | 379 | 664 | 1.19% | 0.76% | 1.25% |
| Hispanic or Latino (any race) | 36,038 | 38,812 | 40,114 | 78.74% | 78.08% | 75.81% |
| Total | 45,768 | 49,708 | 52,912 | 100.00% | 100.00% | 100.00% |

=== 2020 census ===
As of the 2020 census, West New York had a population of 52,912. The median age was 36.6 years. 20.5% of residents were under the age of 18 and 12.9% of residents were 65 years of age or older. For every 100 females there were 97.9 males, and for every 100 females age 18 and over there were 94.9 males age 18 and over.

100.0% of residents lived in urban areas, while 0.0% lived in rural areas.

There were 20,544 households in West New York, of which 31.1% had children under the age of 18 living in them. Of all households, 36.5% were married-couple households, 21.8% were households with a male householder and no spouse or partner present, and 33.5% were households with a female householder and no spouse or partner present. About 29.5% of all households were made up of individuals and 10.9% had someone living alone who was 65 years of age or older.

There were 21,798 housing units, of which 5.8% were vacant. The homeowner vacancy rate was 2.1% and the rental vacancy rate was 4.0%.

=== 2010 census ===
The 2010 United States census counted 49,708 people, 18,852 households, and 11,783 families in the town. The population density was 49,341.7 per square mile (19,050.9/km^{2}). There were 20,018 housing units at an average density of 19,870.5 per square mile (7,672.0/km^{2}). The racial makeup was 62.04% (30,839) White, 4.60% (2,289) Black or African American, 1.50% (744) Native American, 6.01% (2,986) Asian, 0.05% (24) Pacific Islander, 20.19% (10,038) from other races, and 5.61% (2,788) from two or more races. Hispanic or Latino of any race were 78.08% (38,812) of the population.

Of the 18,852 households, 28.6% had children under the age of 18; 37.6% were married couples living together; 16.8% had a female householder with no husband present and 37.5% were non-families. Of all households, 29.5% were made up of individuals and 10.5% had someone living alone who was 65 years of age or older. The average household size was 2.64 and the average family size was 3.23.

21.0% of the population were under the age of 18, 9.7% from 18 to 24, 35.4% from 25 to 44, 21.9% from 45 to 64, and 11.9% who were 65 years of age or older. The median age was 34.8 years. For every 100 females, the population had 98.4 males. For every 100 females ages 18 and older there were 96.8 males.

As of the 2010 United States census, West New York had the third-highest percentage of Hispanics in the state, at 78.1%, accounting for 2.5% of the state's Hispanic population. Though Native Americans comprise less than 1% of the city's population, they doubled in the 2000s, and combined with Union City's Native Americans comprise 38% of the county's Native American population.

The Census Bureau's 2006–2010 American Community Survey showed that (in 2010 inflation-adjusted dollars) median household income was $44,657 (with a margin of error of ± $2,850) and the median family income was $42,534 (± $3,689). Males had a median income of $36,768 (± $2,414) versus $30,688 (± $1,952) for females. The per capita income for the borough was $24,419 (± $1,215). About 15.8% of families and 18.1% of the population were below the poverty line, including 23.6% of those under age 18 and 25.6% of those age 65 or over.

=== 2000 census ===
As of the 2000 United States census, there were 45,768 people, 16,719 households, and 11,034 families residing in the town. The population density was 44,995.1/mi^{2} (17,324.6/km^{2}). There were 17,360 housing units at an average density of 17,066.8/mi^{2} (6,571.3 km^{2}). The racial makeup of the town was 60.09% White, 3.55% African American, 0.67% Native American, 2.93% Asian, 0.03% Pacific Islander, 25.16% from other races, and 7.57% from two or more races. 78.74% of the population were Hispanic or Latino of any race.

There were 16,719 households, out of which 31.1% had children under the age of 18 living with them, 41.9% were married couples living together, 16.9% had a woman whose husband did not live with her, and 34.0% were non-families. 27.5% of all households were made up of individuals, and 11.3% had someone living alone who was 65 years of age or older. The average household size was 2.74 and the average family size was 3.30.

In the town, the age distribution of the population showed 22.3% under the age of 18, 10.9% from 18 to 24, 34.1% from 25 to 44, 19.9% from 45 to 64, and 12.7% who were 65 years of age or older. The median age was 34 years. For every 100 females, there were 96.4 males. For every 100 females age 18 and over, there were 94.5 males.

The median income for a household in the town was $31,980, and the median income for a family was $34,083. Males had a median income of $26,703 versus $22,326 for females. The per capita income for the town was $16,719. 18.9% of the population and 16.1% of families were below the poverty line. Out of the total people living in poverty, 25.4% were under the age of 18 and 22.3% were 65 or older.

As of the 2000 Census, West New York was ranked as #52 on a list of cities with the highest percentage of renters. 80.1% of West New York residents lived in renter-occupied housing units, vs. 33.8% nationwide.

== Economy ==
Bergenline Avenue is the main shopping district of North Hudson. West New York's Urban Enterprise Zone, one of seven established by legislation in 1996, covers portions of Bergenline Avenue from 49th to 67th Streets.

Portions of town are part of an Urban Enterprise Zone, including portions of Bergenline Avenue from 49th to 67th Streets. West New York was selected in 1996 as one of a group of seven zones added to participate in the program. In addition to other benefits to encourage employment and investment within the UEZ, shoppers can take advantage of a reduced 3.3125% sales tax rate (half of the 6 5/8% rate charged statewide) at eligible merchants. Established in May 1996, the town's Urban Enterprise Zone status expires in May 2027.

Until the 1880s, the primary commercial area of West New York was Palisade Avenue. An influential citizen named Henry Kohlmeier who lived there objected to the noise created by horse-drawn public coaches, which led to the route being transferred one block west to what is now Bergenline Avenue (formerly Lewis Street), which runs parallel to Palisade Avenue, and which remains the city's main commercial thoroughfare. Currently the longest commercial avenue in the state, boasting over 300 retail stores and restaurants, Bergenline runs through not only the entire length of West New York from north to south, but also through Union City, Guttenberg and North Bergen, making it the main commercial strip for North Hudson. Also known as the "Miracle Mile", Bergenline's largest concentration of retail and chain stores begins at the intersection of 32nd Street in Union City, and continues north until 92nd Street in North Bergen. Bergenline Avenue is also used as the route for local parades, such as the annual Memorial Day Parade Cuban Day Parade and Dominican-American Parade.

== Points of interest ==
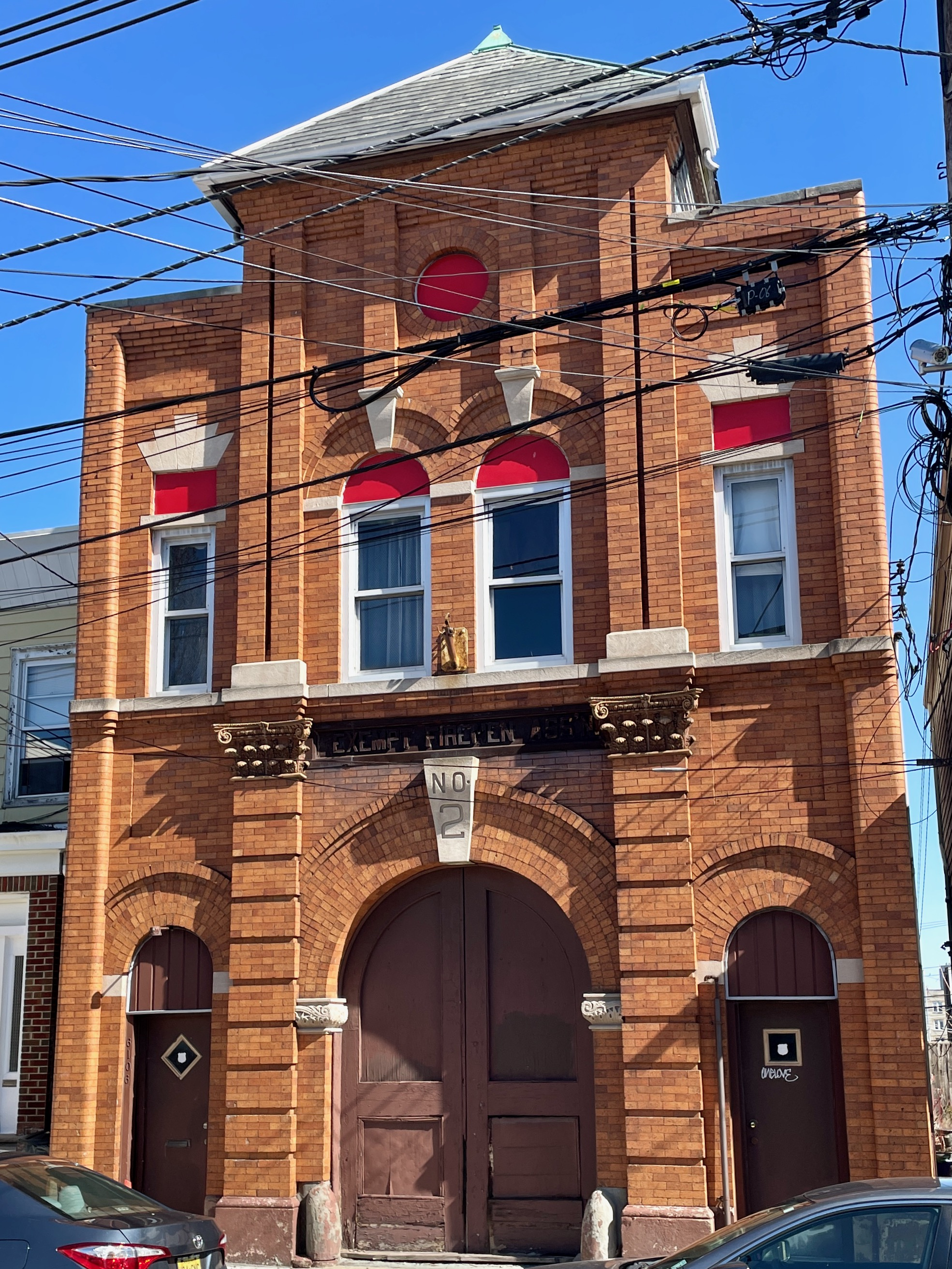
Excelsior Engine Co. No. 2 Firehouse

- Excelsior Engine Co. No. 2 Firehouse on Polk Street, listed on the National Register of Historic Places in 2022.

== Sports ==
In 1898, the Brooklyn Bridegrooms played two games at the West New York Field Club Grounds. The New York Giants played one game at the field in 1898 and four in 1899.

In 2011, Formula One announced plans to host a street race on a 3.2-mile (5.1 km) in West New York and Weehawken called Grand Prix of America, which would begin in June 2013.

== Government ==
=== Local government ===
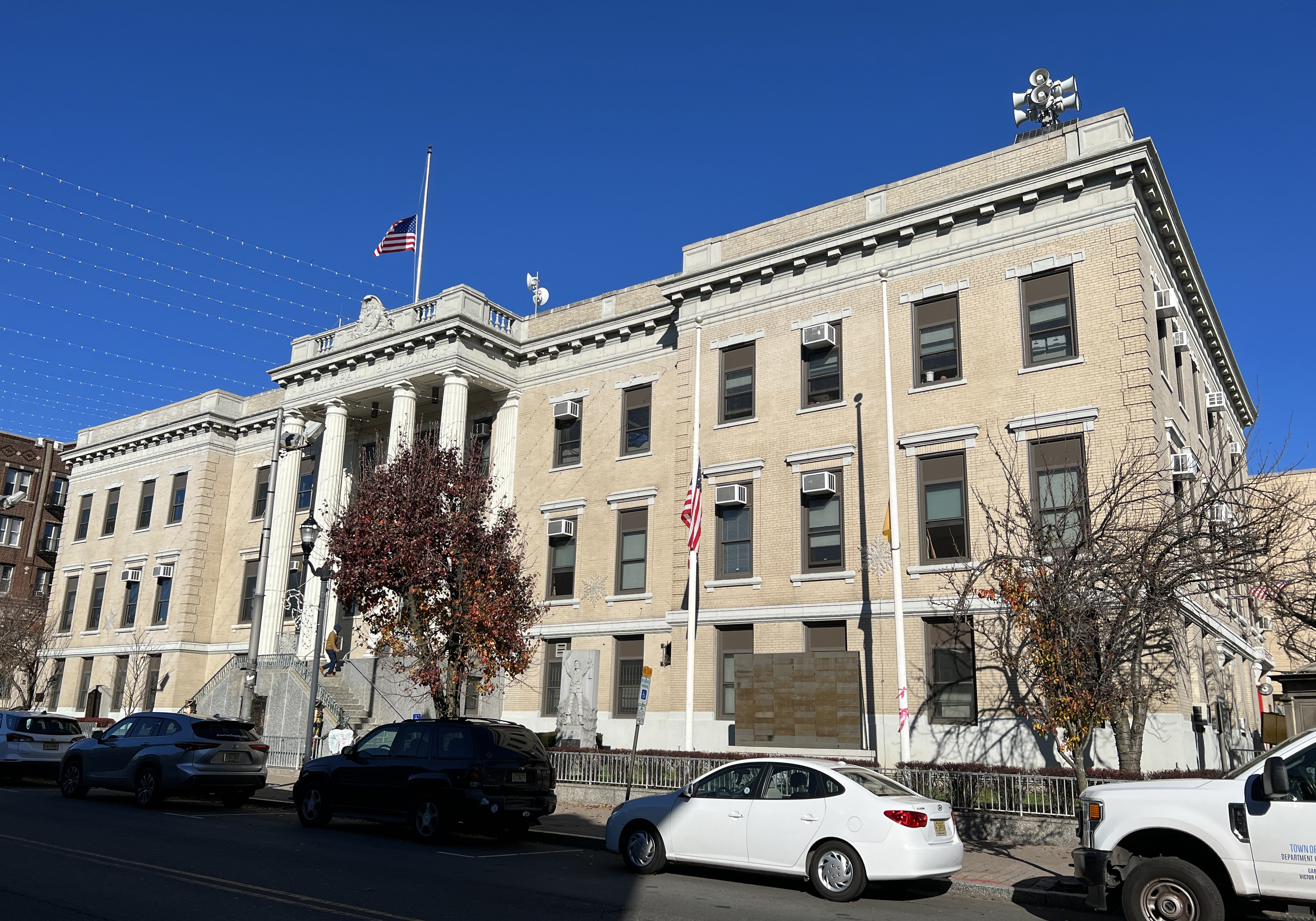
West New York City Hall

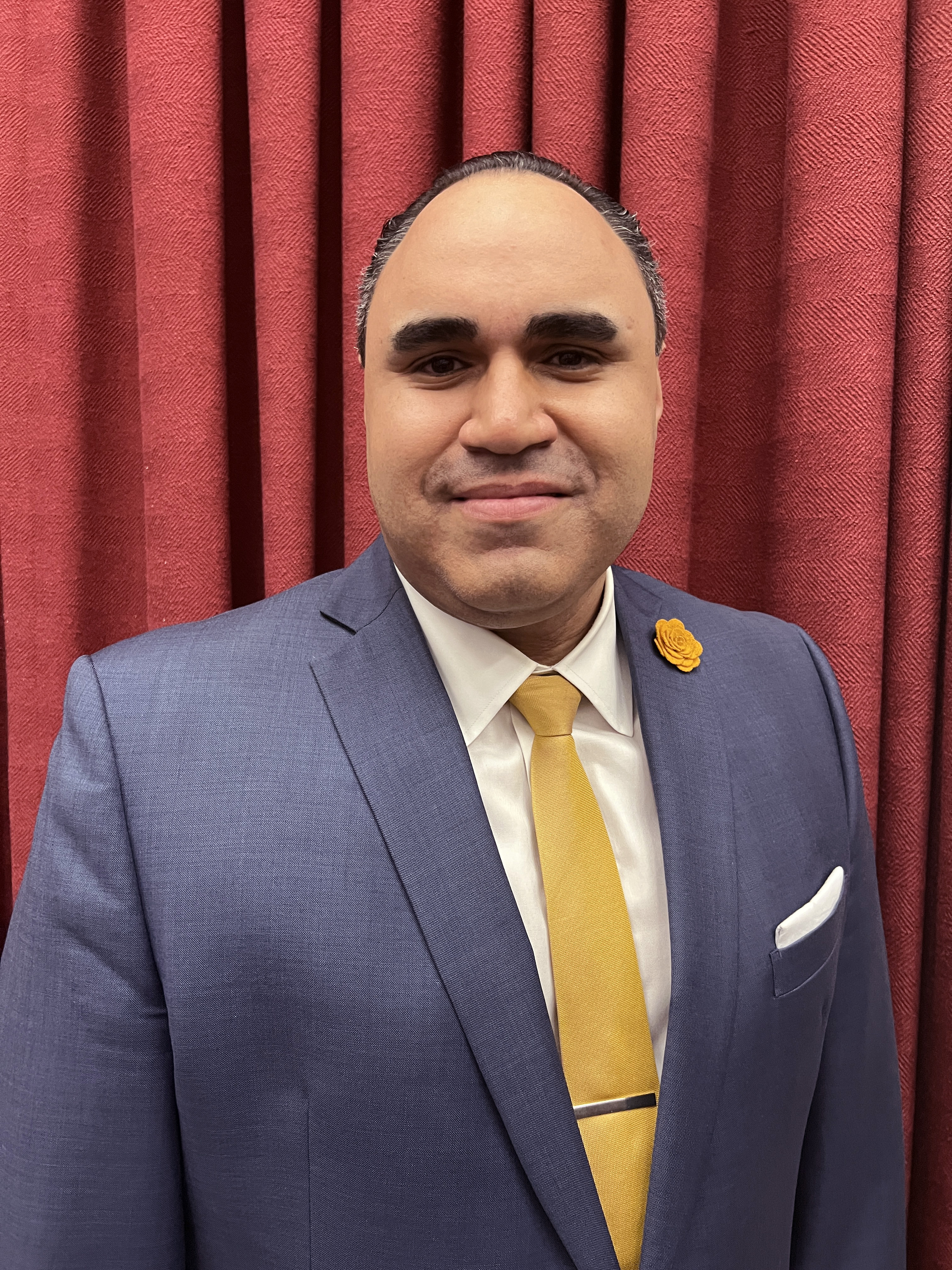
Former mayor Gabriel Rodriguez

Since 1931, West New York has been governed under the Walsh Act form of New Jersey municipal government. The town is one of 30 municipalities (of the 564) statewide that use the commission form of government. The governing body is comprised of a five-member commission, whose members are elected at-large in non-partisan elections to serve four-year terms of office on a concurrent basis as part of the May municipal election. Each Commissioner is assigned to head one of five departments. The Commission selects one of its members to serve as mayor.

As of May 2023, the five members of the West New York Board of Commissioners are Mayor Albio Sires, Marcos Arroyo, Victor Barrera, Marielka Diaz and Adam Parkinson, all serving concurrent terms of office ending May 15, 2027.

In the May 2011 municipal election, the "Together We Can" slate of five candidates led by Roque took all five seats on the Town Council, knocking off the slate of incumbents led by then-mayor Silverio Vega. At the town council's reorganization meeting, the five commissioners unanimously voted to appoint Roque to a four-year term as Mayor of West New York.

In February 2015, Cosmo Cirillo was selected to fill the vacant seat of Rubin Vargas, making Cirillo the youngest commissioner on town history at the age of 27.

=== Federal, state and county representation ===
West New York is located in the 8th Congressional District and is part of New Jersey's 33rd state legislative district.

For the 119th United States Congress, New Jersey's 8th congressional district is represented by Rob Menendez (D, Jersey City). New Jersey is represented in the United States Senate by Democrats Cory Booker (Newark, term ends 2027) and Andy Kim (Moorestown, term ends 2031).

For the 2026–2027 session, the 33rd legislative district of the New Jersey Legislature is represented in the State Senate by Brian P. Stack (D, Union City) and in the General Assembly by Gabe Rodriguez (D, West New York) and Larry Wainstein (D, North Bergen).

Hudson County is governed by the directly elected Hudson County Executive and by a Board of County Commissioners, which serves as the county's legislative body. As of 2025, Hudson County's Hudson County Executive is Craig Guy (D, Jersey City), whose term of office expires December 31, 2027. Hudson County's Commissioners are Kenneth Kopacz (D, District 1 - Bayonne and parts of Jersey City; 2026, Bayonne), William O'Dea (D, District 2 - Western Jersey City; 2026, Jersey City), Vice Chair Jerry Walker (D, District 3 - South Eastern Jersey City Yraida Aponte-Lipski (D, District 4 - North Eastern Jersey City; 2026, Jersey City), Chair Anthony L. Romano Jr. (D, District 5 - Hoboken and parts of Jersey City; 2026, Hoboken), Fanny J. Cedeño (D, District 6 - Union City; 2026, Union City), Caridad Rodriguez (D, District 7 - Weehawken, West New York, and Gutenberg; 2026, West New York), Robert Bascelice (D, District 8 - West New York, North Bergen, Secaucus; 2026, North Bergen) and Albert J. Cifelli (D, District 9 - Secaucus, Kearny, East Newark, Harrison; 2026, Harrison)

Hudson County's constitutional officers are County Clerk E. Junior Maldonado (D, Jersey City, 2027), Register Jeffrey Dublin (D, Jersey City, 2026) Sheriff Frank X. Schillari (R, Jersey City, 2025) and Surrogate Tilo E. Rivas (D, Jersey City, 2029)

=== Politics ===
As of March 2011, there were a total of 19,438 registered voters in West New York, of which 10,510 (54.1%) were registered as Democrats, 2,460 (12.7%) were registered as Republicans and 6,456 (33.2%) were registered as Unaffiliated. There were 12 voters registered to other parties.

Gubernatorial election results for West New York
| Year | Republican | | Democratic | | Third party(ies) | |
| Year | No. | % | No. | % | No. | % |
|---|---|---|---|---|---|---|
| 2025 | 2,097 | 21.19% | 7,722 | 78.02% | 78 | 0.79% |
| 2021 | 1,537 | 25.14% | 4,540 | 74.27% | 36 | 0.59% |
| 2017 | 869 | 15.39% | 4,684 | 82.98% | 92 | 1.63% |
| 2013 | 2,416 | 42.40% | 3,188 | 55.95% | 94 | 1.65% |
| 2009 | 1,907 | 25.77% | 5,328 | 72.01% | 164 | 2.22% |
| 2005 | 1,839 | 23.77% | 5,767 | 74.53% | 132 | 1.71% |

In the 2012 presidential election, Democrat Barack Obama received 77.5% of the vote (9,682 cast), ahead of Republican Mitt Romney with 21.8% (2,725 votes), and other candidates with 0.7% (85 votes), among the 12,605 ballots cast by the town's 21,268 registered voters (113 ballots were spoiled), for a turnout of 59.3%. In the 2008 presidential election, Democrat Barack Obama received 69.6% of the vote (9,071 cast), ahead of Republican John McCain with 29.0% (3,773 votes) and other candidates with 0.6% (78 votes), among the 13,026 ballots cast by the town's 21,023 registered voters, for a turnout of 62.0%. In the 2004 presidential election, Democrat John Kerry received 60.8% of the vote (7,229 ballots cast), outpolling Republican George W. Bush with 36.4% (4,329 votes) and other candidates with 0.3% (54 votes), among the 11,883 ballots cast by the town's 18,058 registered voters, for a turnout percentage of 65.8.

Presidential Elections Results
| Year | Republican | Democratic | Third Parties |
|---|---|---|---|
| 2024 | 42.1% 5,820 | 55.4% 7,652 | 2.5% 338 |
| 2020 | 29.7% 4,611 | 67.7% 10,516 | 2.6% 115 |
| 2016 | 22.4% 2,776 | 75.0% 9,312 | 2.3% 289 |
| 2012 | 21.8% 2,725 | 77.5% 9,682 | 0.7% 85 |
| 2008 | 29.0% 3,773 | 69.6% 9,071 | 0.6% 78 |
| 2004 | 36.4% 4,329 | 60.8% 7,229 | 0.3% 54 |

In the 2013 gubernatorial election, Democrat Barbara Buono received 55.9% of the vote (3,188 cast), ahead of Republican Chris Christie with 42.4% (2,416 votes), and other candidates with 1.6% (94 votes), among the 5,978 ballots cast by the town's 22,092 registered voters (280 ballots were spoiled), for a turnout of 27.1%. In the 2009 gubernatorial election, Democrat Jon Corzine received 71.2% of the vote (5,328 ballots cast), ahead of Republican Chris Christie with 25.5% (1,907 votes), Independent Chris Daggett with 1.3% (97 votes) and other candidates with 0.9% (67 votes), among the 7,481 ballots cast by the town's 19,045 registered voters, yielding a 39.3% turnout.

United States Senate election results for West New York1
| Year | Republican | | Democratic | | Third party(ies) | |
| Year | No. | % | No. | % | No. | % |
|---|---|---|---|---|---|---|
| 2024 | 4,581 | 37.76% | 7,120 | 58.69% | 430 | 3.54% |
| 2018 | 2,016 | 20.26% | 7,658 | 76.95% | 278 | 2.79% |
| 2012 | 2,139 | 18.68% | 9,166 | 80.05% | 145 | 1.27% |
| 2006 | 1,809 | 21.95% | 6,377 | 77.36% | 57 | 0.69% |

United States Senate election results for West New York2
| Year | Republican | | Democratic | | Third party(ies) | |
| Year | No. | % | No. | % | No. | % |
|---|---|---|---|---|---|---|
| 2020 | 3,798 | 26.27% | 10,322 | 71.41% | 335 | 2.32% |
| 2014 | 1,171 | 22.00% | 4,017 | 75.46% | 135 | 2.54% |
| 2013 | 694 | 21.40% | 2,498 | 77.03% | 51 | 1.57% |
| 2008 | 2,902 | 27.04% | 7,645 | 71.24% | 185 | 1.72% |

== Education ==
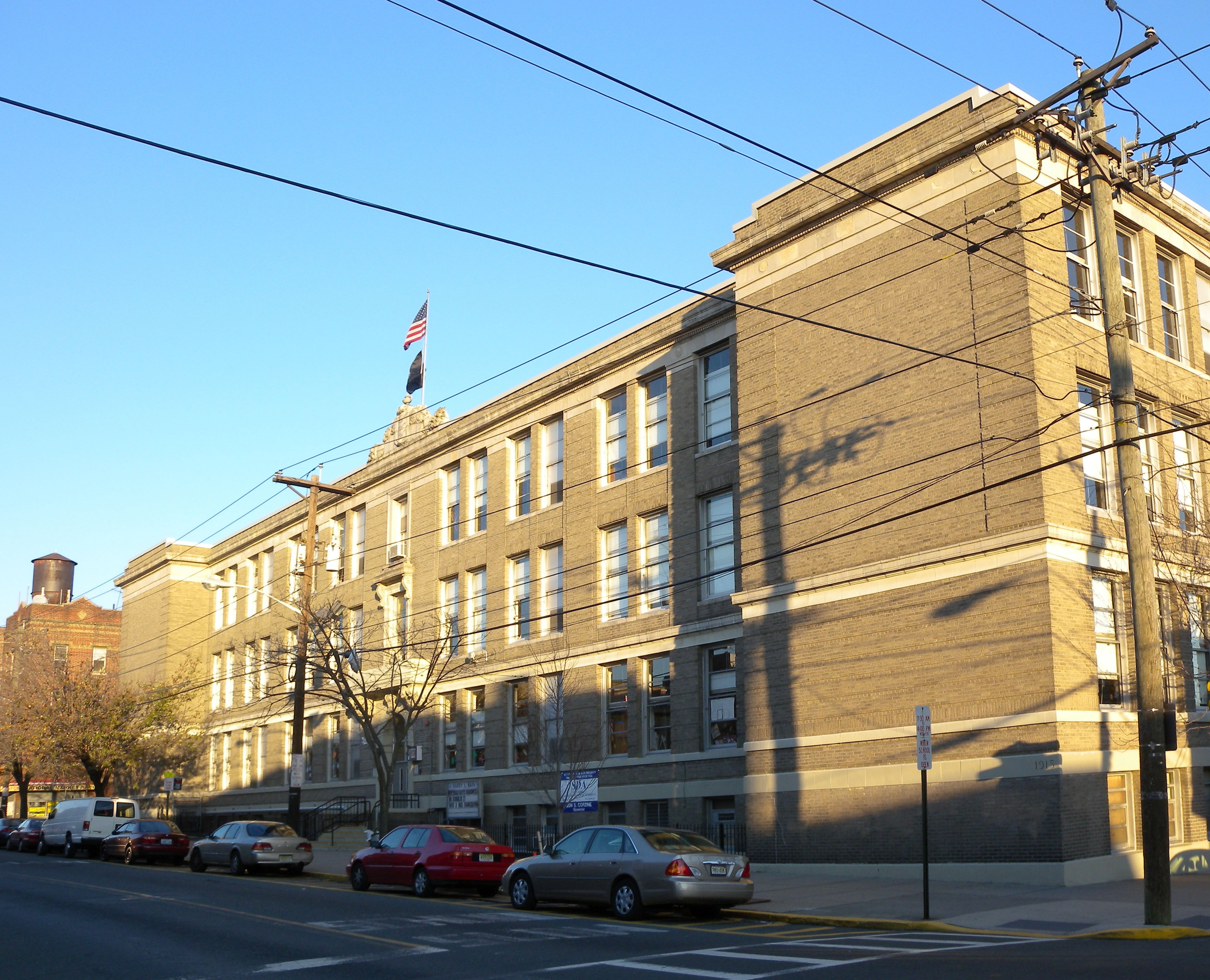
Harry L Bain School

West New York is served by the West New York School District for pre-kindergarten through twelfth grade. The district is one of 31 former Abbott districts statewide that were established pursuant to the decision by the New Jersey Supreme Court in Abbott v. Burke which are now referred to as "SDA Districts" based on the requirement for the state to cover all costs for school building and renovation projects in these districts under the supervision of the New Jersey Schools Development Authority.

As of the 2019–20 school year, the district, comprised of nine schools, had an enrollment of 8,545 students and 593.0 classroom teachers (on an FTE basis), for a student–teacher ratio of 14.3:1. Schools in the district (with 2019–20 enrollment data from the National Center for Education Statistics) are Early Childhood School with 502 students in Pre-K, Public School #1 with 860 students in grades K–6, Public School #2 with 716 students in grades K–6, Public School #3, with 574 students in grades K–6, Albio Sires Elementary School (School #4) with 678 students in grades K–6, Public School #5 with 673 students in grades K–6, Harry L. Bain Elementary School (School #6) with 675 students in grades K–6, West New York Middle School with 1,125 students in grades 7–8. and Memorial High School with 2,079 students in grades 9–12.

Private schools in West New York include Academy of St. Joseph of the Palisades, a K-8 Catholic school, which is overseen by the Roman Catholic Archdiocese of Newark. In the wake of declining enrollment and lingering financial issues, Mother Seton Interparochial School (which had been formed in 2006 from the merger of St. Michael's and St. Anthony of Padua) and St. Augustine's School, both of which had been located in Union City, were closed by the Newark Archdiocese after the 2019–20 school year and merged into Academy of St. Joseph of the Palisades.

American Training School for Medical Professionals is a bilingual medical school founded in 1998 by Professor Dante Joa.

== Emergency services ==
West New York does not have its own fire department, but is one of five municipalities served by the North Hudson Regional Fire and Rescue.

The West New York Emergency Medical Squad consists of 26 people (as of May 2011) who are based at the EMS house on 62nd Street, which houses four trucks, to which each is assigned two workers. The Squad's second, larger facility, at 66th Street, opened May 11, 2011.

West New York's Emergency Medical Services was among the many Hudson County agencies that responded to the January 2009 crash of US Airways Flight 1549, for which they received accolades from the survivors.

== Transportation ==
=== Roads and highways ===
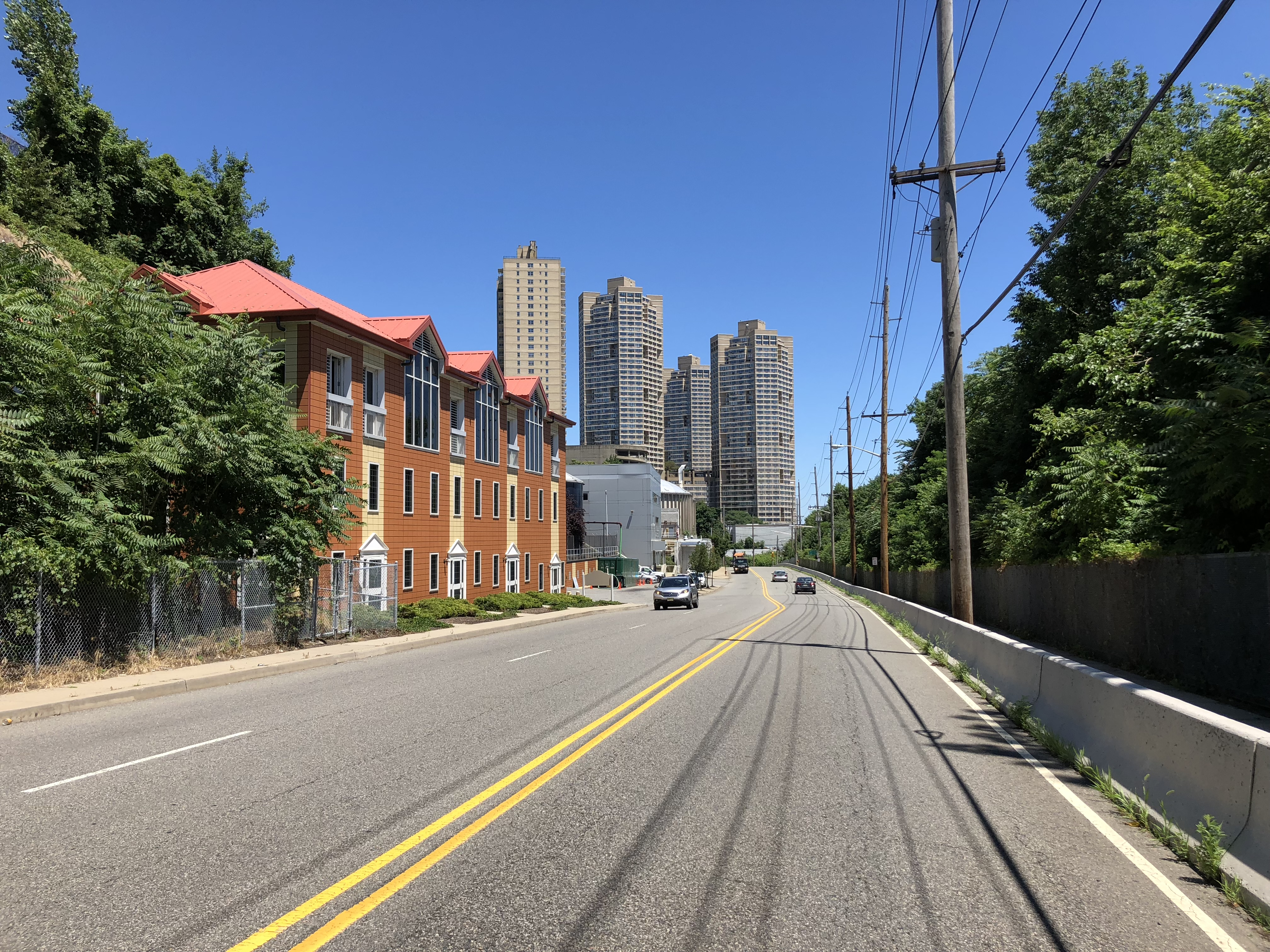
County Route 505, also known as Anthony Defino Way, in West New York

As of May 2010, the town had a total of 24.11 miles (38.80 km) of roadways, of which 21.92 miles (35.28 km) were maintained by the municipality, 2.19 miles (3.52 km) by Hudson County.

The only significant roads directly serving West New York are county highways. County Route 501 follows Kennedy Boulevard along the town's western border. County Route 505 follows Boulevard East and Anthony Defino Way on the east side of town. Both roads are oriented north–south. Interstate 95 (the New Jersey Turnpike), U.S. Route 1/9 and New Jersey Route 495 are major highways located in adjacent municipalities.

=== Public transportation ===
NJ Transit bus service is available to the Port Authority Bus Terminal in Midtown Manhattan on the 128, 154, 156, 158, 159, 165, 166 and 168 routes. The 181 and 188 routes offer service to the George Washington Bridge Bus Terminal. Travel to other New Jersey communities, including Jersey City, is offered on the 22, 23, 84, 86, 88 and 89.

The Bergenline Avenue station of Hudson-Bergen Light Rail is located at the city line with Union City, while the Weehawken Port Imperial station is located on the Weehawken waterfront at the foot of Pershing Road near the NY Waterway ferry terminal. Regular ferry crossings of the Hudson River run daily.

Jitney commuter buses operate along Bergenline Avenue, providing service to the Port Authority Bus Terminal, the George Washington Bridge Bus Station, the Newport Centre and other local destinations. The county's most frequent route for dollar buses, jitneys operate along Bergenline Avenue as frequently as one bus every minute.

The closest airport in New Jersey with scheduled passenger service is Newark Liberty International Airport, located 13.6 miles (21.9 km) away in Newark and Elizabeth. New York City's LaGuardia Airport is 13.5 miles (21.7 km) away in Queens via the Lincoln Tunnel.

== Media and culture ==
West New York is located within the New York media market, with most of its daily papers available for sale or delivery. The Jersey Journal is a local daily paper based in Jersey City. Local weeklies include the free bilingual paper, Hudson Dispatch Weekly, a former daily, The West New York Reporter, which is part of the Hudson Reporter group of local weeklies, and the Spanish language El Especialito. River View Observer is a monthly newspaper that covers the Hudson County waterfront market.

In the late 2000s, West New York, Weehawken, Union City and North Bergen came to be dubbed collectively as "NoHu", a North Hudson haven for local performing and fine artists, many of whom are immigrants from Latin America and other countries, in part due to lower housing costs compared to those in nearby art havens such as Hoboken, Jersey City and Manhattan.

== Notable people ==
People who were born in, residents of, or otherwise closely associated with West New York include:

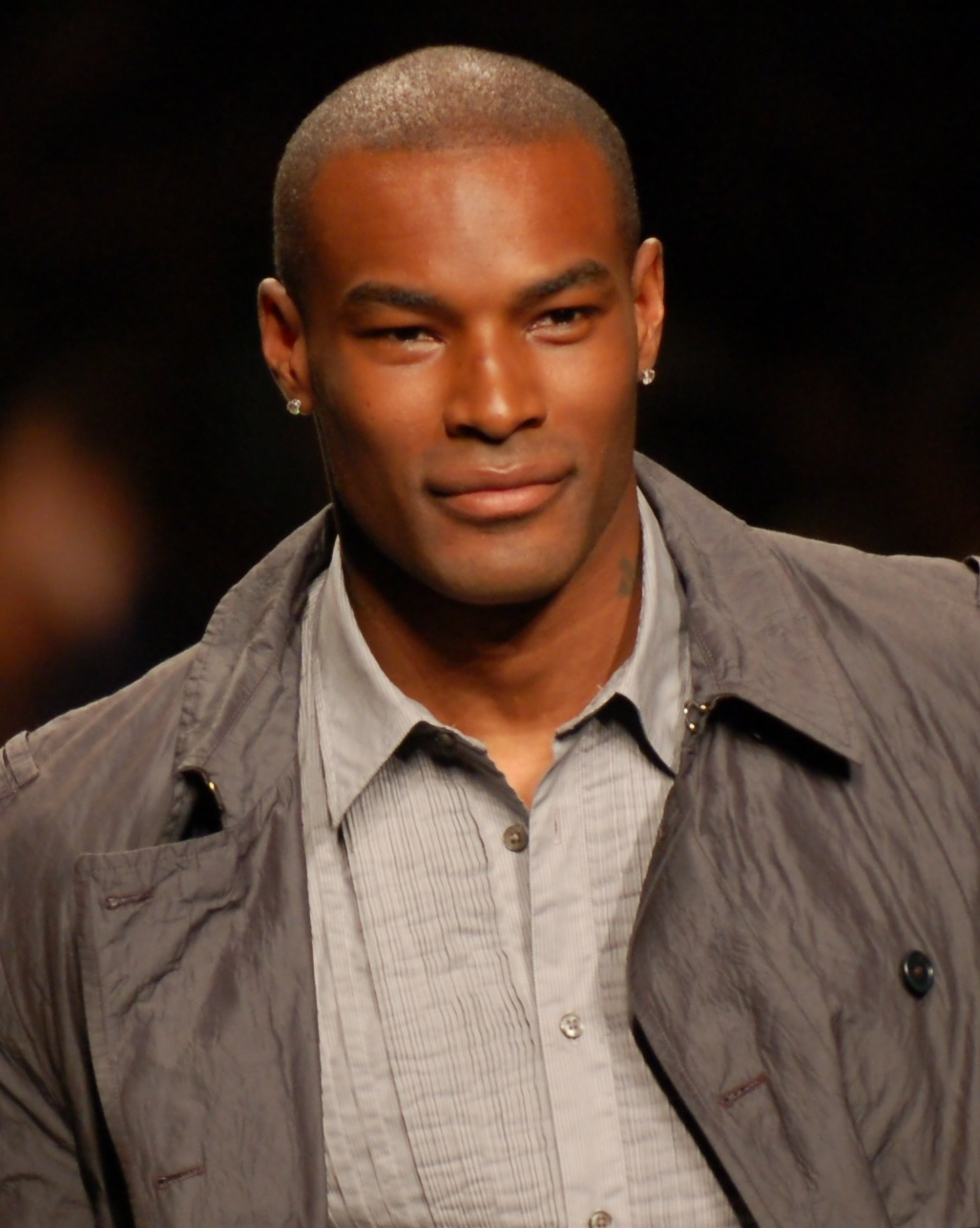
Tyson Beckford

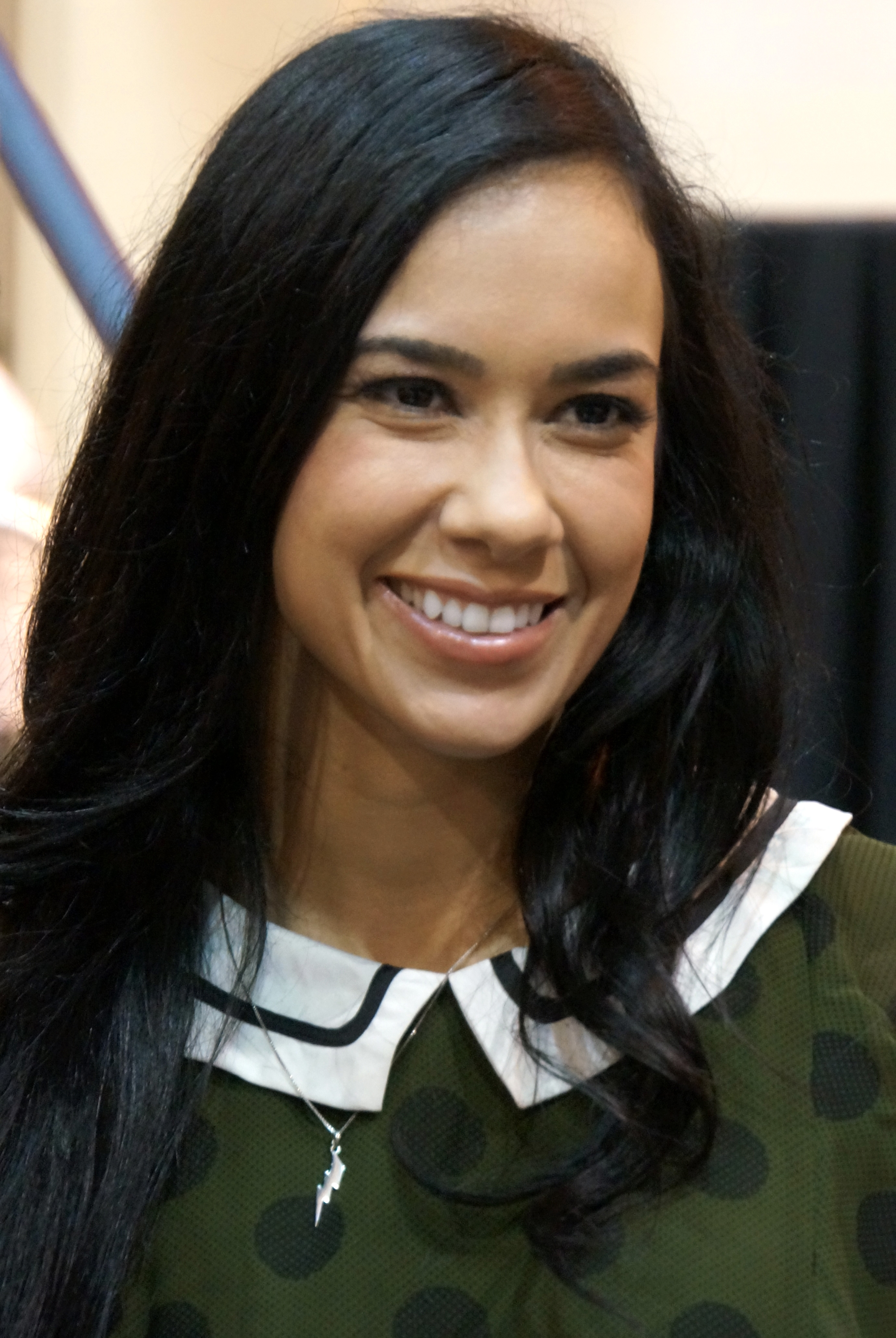
AJ Lee

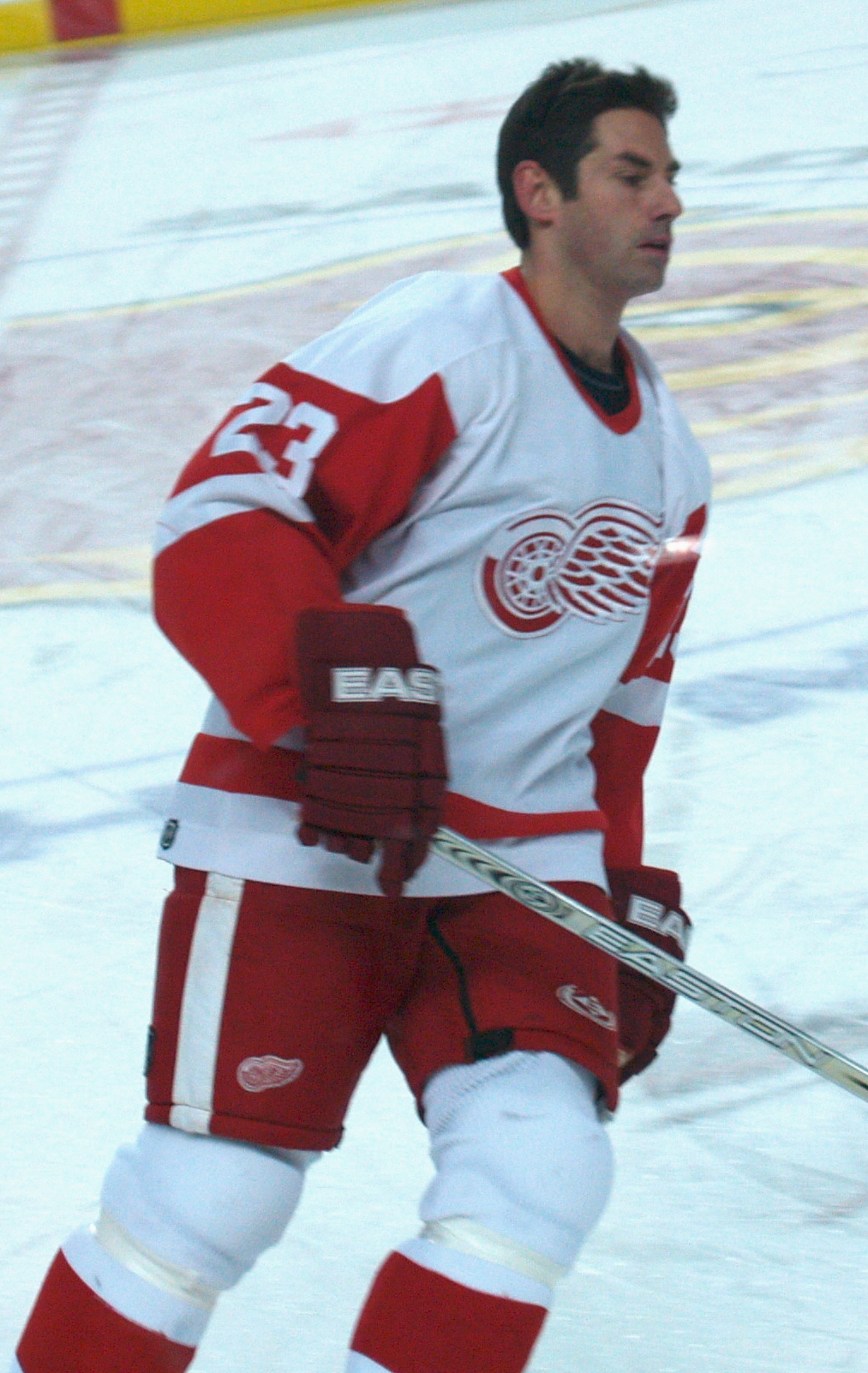
Mathieu Schneider

- Christine Elizabeth Abrahamsen (1916–1995), author of science fiction and gothic novels
- Nick Acocella (1943–2020), political journalist and author
- Ronald Alexander (1917–1995), playwright best known for writing Broadway comedic plays
- George Alvarez, actor known for the soap operas General Hospital, Port Charles and Guiding Light
- Jose Arango (born 1937), politician who represented the 33rd Legislative District in the New Jersey General Assembly from 1984 to 1986
- Manuela Arbeláez (born 1988), model and actress who has appeared on The Price Is Right
- Oscar L. Auf der Heide (1874–1945), politician who represented the New Jersey's 11th congressional district from 1925 to 1933 and the 14th congressional district from 1933 to 1935
- Tyson Beckford (born 1970), male supermodel
- Warren Boroson (born 1935), financial journalist, author and playwright
- James J. Braddock (1905–1974), heavyweight boxing champion
- Rob Byrnes (born 1958), author and blogger
- Sebastian Capozucchi (born 1995), professional footballer who plays as a defender for USL League One club Chattanooga Red Wolves
- Frank Cumiskey (1912–2004), Olympic silver medal-winning gymnast
- Vincent J. Dellay (1907–1999), Congressman who represented New Jersey's 14th congressional district
- Emil Draitser (born 1937), author of 12 books and 135 short stories, professor of Russian at Hunter College
- Ruth Brewer Eisenberg (1902–1996), pianist who was "Ivory" of the inter-racial piano duo Ebony and Ivory
- Amber Lee Ettinger (born 1982), actress and internet celebrity who rose to fame in 2007 as "Obama Girl"
- Zulima Farber (born 1946), former New Jersey Attorney General
- Ada Ferrer (born 1962), historian, writer and professor
- Noli Francisco (1941–2017), professional poker player
- Morton Freedgood (1913–2006), author of the novel The Taking of Pelham One Two Three
- Alan Gewirth (1912–2004), philosopher, a professor of philosophy at the University of Chicago and author of Reason and Morality
- Don Guardian (born 1953), politician who has represented the 2nd Legislative District in the New Jersey General Assembly since 2022
- Walter Hendl (1917–2007), conductor, composer and pianist
- Arthur Imperatore Sr. (1925–2020), businessman who founded the NY Waterway service
- Christopher Jackman (1916–1991), politician who served in both houses of the New Jersey Legislature, and was Speaker of the New Jersey General Assembly from 1978 until 1982
- Angelica M. Jimenez (born 1965), politician who has served in the New Jersey General Assembly since 2012, where she represents the 32nd Legislative District
- King Kamali (born 1972), IFBB professional bodybuilder
- AJ Lee (born 1987), actress and retired professional wrestler, best known for her time in WWE
- Herb Maack (1917–2007), former Brooklyn Dodgers (AAFC) player and college football head coach
- Ray Machado, Cuban-American musician and founder of the Cuban fusion band Máxima Alerta
- John Mahnken (born 1922), former professional basketball player
- Harold Martin (1918–2010), member of the New Jersey General Assembly
- Maytee Martinez (born 1991), Cuban American model, designer and television personality
- Edward James Olmos (born 1947), actor who lived in West New York from 1979 to 1987, while he built his stage career following his emigration from East Los Angeles
- Harry Otis (1886–1976), pitcher who played in five games for the Cleveland Naps in 1909
- Nelson J. Perez (born 1961), prelate of the Roman Catholic Church who serves as the 10th archbishop of the Archdiocese of Philadelphia
- Artie Pitt (1913–2002) gymnast who competed in eight events at the 1936 Summer Olympics
- Gene Prebola (born 1938), tight end who played in the NFL for the Oakland Raiders, Denver Broncos and New York Jets
- Caridad Rodriguez (born 1947), former member of the New Jersey General Assembly
- Jeff Roehl (born 1980), offensive lineman who played for the New York Giants
- Louis Romano (1930–2000), member of the New Jersey General Assembly
- Felix Roque, Former mayor of West New York
- Frank Ruddle (1929–2013) cell and developmental biologist, born in West New York
- Mathieu Schneider (born 1969), former professional ice hockey defenseman who played 1,289 games in the National Hockey League with ten different teams
- Dick Seay (1904–1981), Negro league baseball all-star second baseman
- Jeremy Shockey (born 1980), NFL football player who has played for the New York Giants, New Orleans Saints and Carolina Panthers
- Ozzie Silna (1932–2016), businessmen best known as being co-owner of the American Basketball Association's Spirits of St. Louis and the lucrative deal cut to fold that team during the ABA-NBA merger
- John Skevin (1927–1993), politician who served in both houses of the New Jersey Legislature
- Albio Sires (born 1951), former mayor of West New York who serves in Congress representing New Jersey's 8th congressional district
- Isabel Toledo (1960–2019), fashion designer
- Vito Valentinetti (1928–2021), professional pitcher who played for five MLB seasons
- Silverio Vega (born 1956), former mayor of West New York who served in the New Jersey General Assembly
- Armando Vilaseca, Commissioner of the Vermont Department of Education
- Jessica Vosk (born 1983), Broadway actress who has starred as Elphaba in the Second National Tour of Wicked
- Gerard Way (born 1977), musician, frontman of the alternative rock band My Chemical Romance
- Jacqueline Walker (born 1941), politician who served in the New Jersey General Assembly from 1984 to 1986
- Warren Wolf (1927–2019), high school football head coach and politician who served as an Ocean County freeholder and a New Jersey State Assemblyman
