= Miftaahul Uloom Academy =

Private school in Hudson County, New Jersey, United States

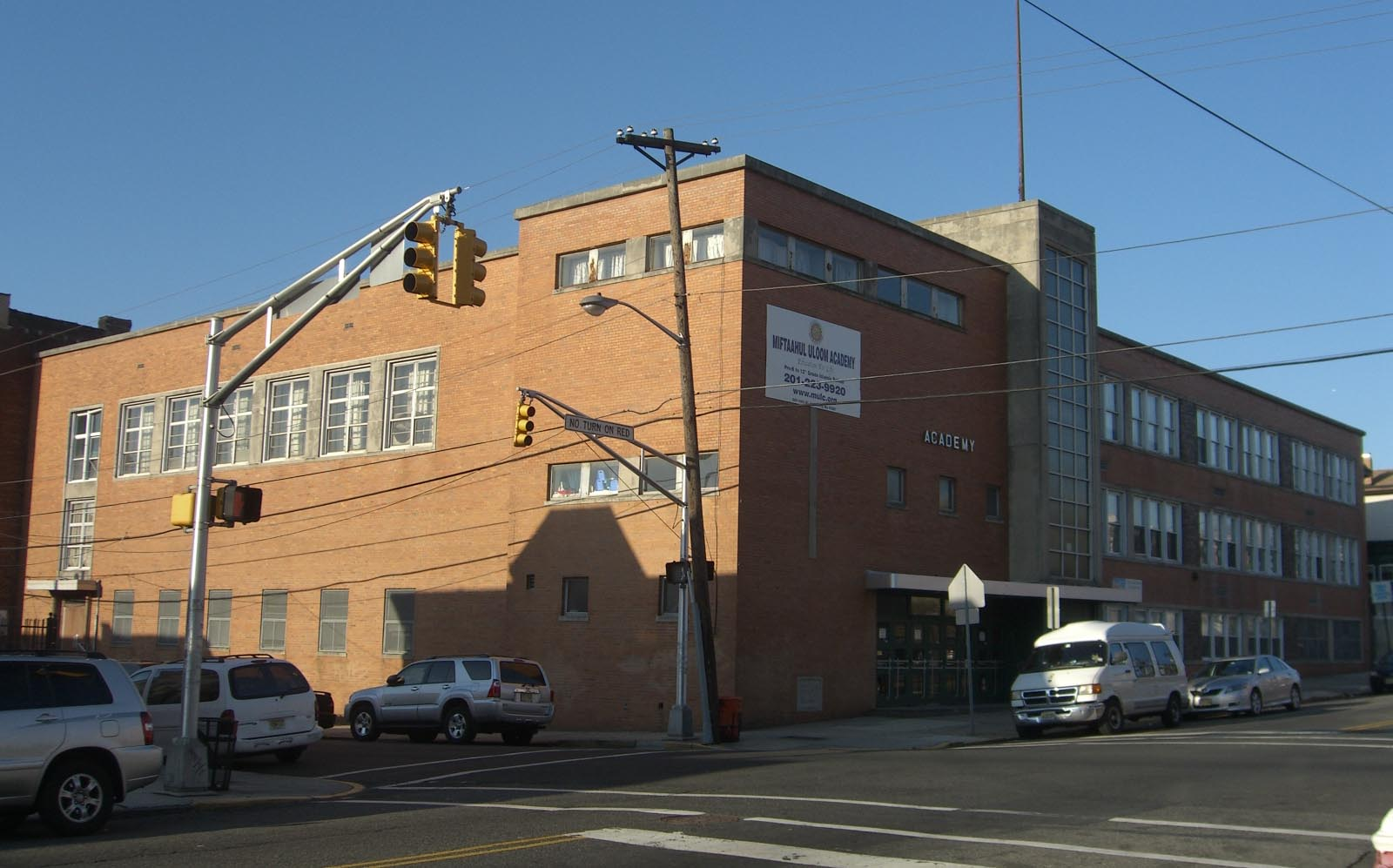

Location
- 501 15th Street; Union City, Hudson County, New Jersey 07087; United States
- 40.757870°N 74.045367°W

Information
- Type: Private
- Established: 1996
- NCES School ID: A0302098
- Principal: Yusuf Jaaber
- Faculty: 22.9 FTEs
- Grades: Preschool to 12th grade
- Enrollment: 152 (plus 34 in PreK, as of 2017–18)
- Student to teacher ratio: 6.6:1
- Colors: Orange, Blue, White
- Nickname: MUA
- Accreditation: AdvancEd
- Website: Official website

Miftaahul Uloom Academy (translated: "The Key to Knowledge") is a private Islamic school in Union City, New Jersey. The schools serves students in pre-school to 12th grade. The school has been accredited by AdvancEd since 2017.

As of the 2017–18 school year, the school had an enrollment of 152 students (plus 34 in PreK) and 22.9 classroom teachers (on an FTE basis), for a student–teacher ratio of 6.6:1. The school's student body was 42.8% (65) Asian, 27.6% (42) White, 15.8% (24) Black, 13.2% (20) two or more races and 0.7% (1) Hispanic.

== History ==
The school was started in 1992 as a cooperative home-schooling center at a residential building in Guttenberg, New Jersey. In 1996, it received 501 (c) 3 status as a registered non-profit organization. In 2001 it moved to Union City, and in 2007 relocated to its current location at the corner of 15th Street and Bergenline Avenue.

== Extracurricular activities ==
In February 2011, a team of 11 students from Miftaahul Uloom Academy, under the supervision of coach Candice Elam, a social studies and religion teacher at the school, and coach Puya Nili, an attorney, took part in a competitive mock civil trial against students from three other Hudson County schools at the Justice William J. Brennan Jr. Courthouse. The academy made it to the semi-finals (having only made it to the quarter finals the previous year), and had faced Jersey City's McNair Academic High School earlier in the day, then faced off against Bayonne High School. Initially, the jury had granted them the win, but the Miftaahul Uloom team placed second, after the judge made the final decision in favor of Bayonne.
