= Union City, New Jersey =

City in Hudson County, New Jersey, US

- City
- City of Union City
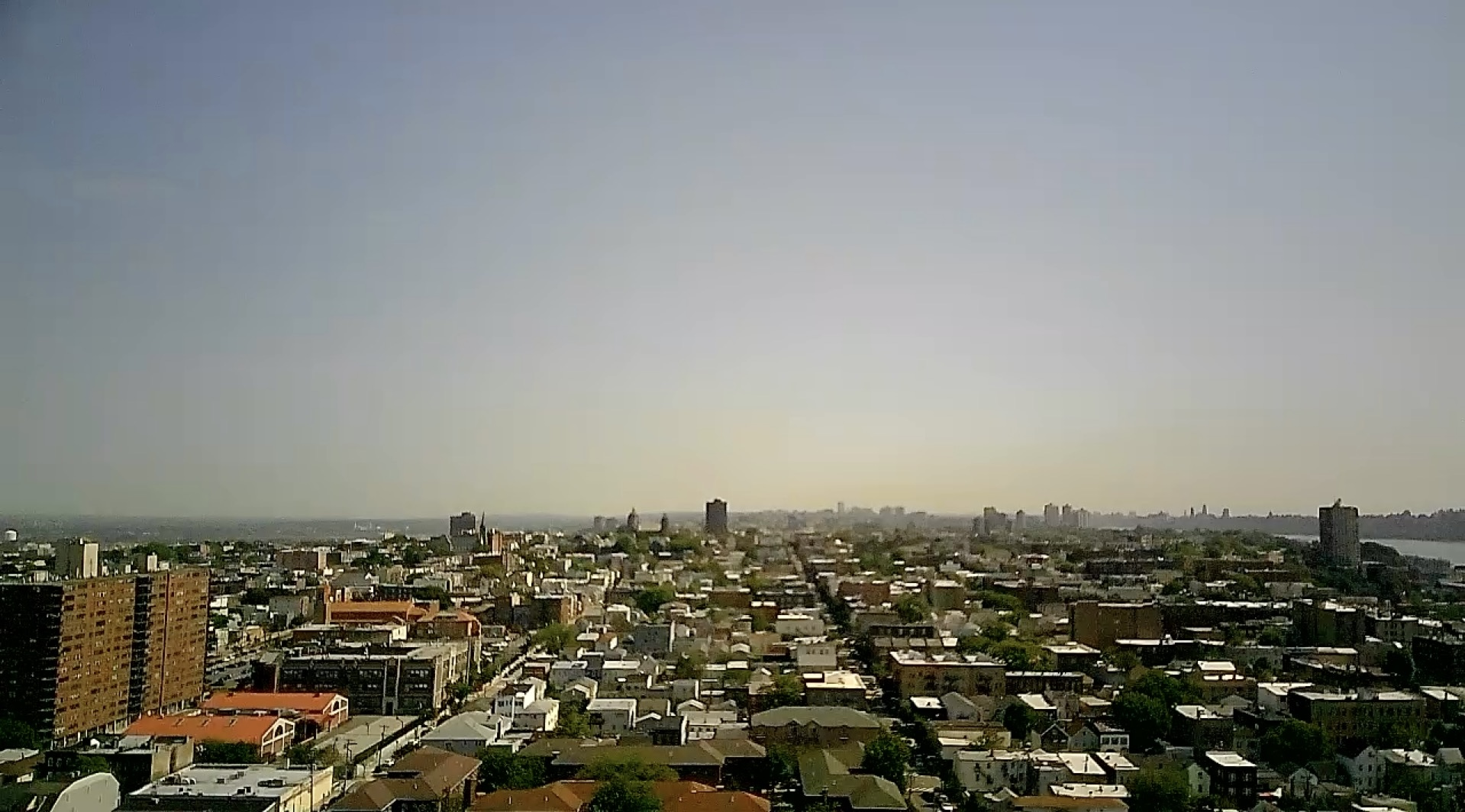
- Aerial shot of the city facing north, taken from its southern border at Washington Park

- Seal
- Nicknames: "Embroidery Capital of the United States" "Havana on the Hudson" "Little Havana on the Hudson"
- Interactive map of Union City, New Jersey
- Location in Hudson County Location in New Jersey Location in the United States
- Coordinates: 40.767425°N 74.032279°W
- Country: United States
- State: New Jersey
- County: Hudson
- Incorporated: June 1, 1925

Government
  - Type: Walsh Act
  - Body: Board of Commissioners
  - Mayor: Brian P. Stack (term ends May 18, 2026)
  - Municipal clerk: Hilda I. Rosario

Area
  - Total: 1.29 sq mi (3.33 km^{2})
  - Land: 1.29 sq mi (3.33 km^{2})
  - Water: 0 sq mi (0.00 km^{2}) 0.00%
  - Rank: 472nd of 565 in state 10th of 12 in county
- Elevation: 190 ft (58 m)

Population (2020)
  - Total: 68,589
  - Estimate (2023): 64,462
  - Rank: 590th in country (as of 2022); 18th of 565 in state 3rd of 12 in county
  - Density: 53,293.7/sq mi (20,576.8/km^{2})
  - Rank: 2nd of 565 in state 2nd of 12 in county
- Time zone: UTC−05:00 (EST)
  - Summer (DST): UTC−04:00 (Eastern (EDT))
- ZIP Code: 07087
- Area code: 201/551
- FIPS code: 3401774630
- GNIS feature ID: 0885424
- Website: ucnj.com

Union City is a city in the northern part of Hudson County, in the U.S. state of New Jersey. As of the 2020 United States census, the city was the state's 18th-most-populous municipality, with a population of 68,589, an increase of 2,134 (+3.2%) from the 2010 census count of 66,455, which in turn had reflected a decline of 633 (−0.9%) from the 67,088 counted in the 2000 census. As of the 2010 Census, among cities with a population of more than 50,000, it was the most densely populated city in the United States, with a density of 54,138 per square mile of land. The Census Bureau's Population Estimates Program calculated that the city's population was 65,366 in 2022, ranking the city the 590th-most-populous in the country.

Union City was incorporated as a city by an act of the New Jersey Legislature on June 1, 1925, with the merger of Union Hill and West Hoboken Township.

Two major waves of immigration, first of German speakers and then of Spanish speakers, greatly influenced the development and character of Union City. Its two nicknames, "Embroidery Capital of the United States" and "Havana on the Hudson", reflect important aspects of that history. Thousands visit Union City each year to see the nation's longest-running passion play.

Union City is where Mallomars were first sold and the site of the first lunch wagon, built by Jerry and Daniel O'Mahoney and John Hanf, which helped spark New Jersey's golden age of diner manufacturing, for which the state is colloquially referred to by author Richard J.S. Gutman as the "diner capital of the world".

== History ==
=== Early history and civic boundaries ===
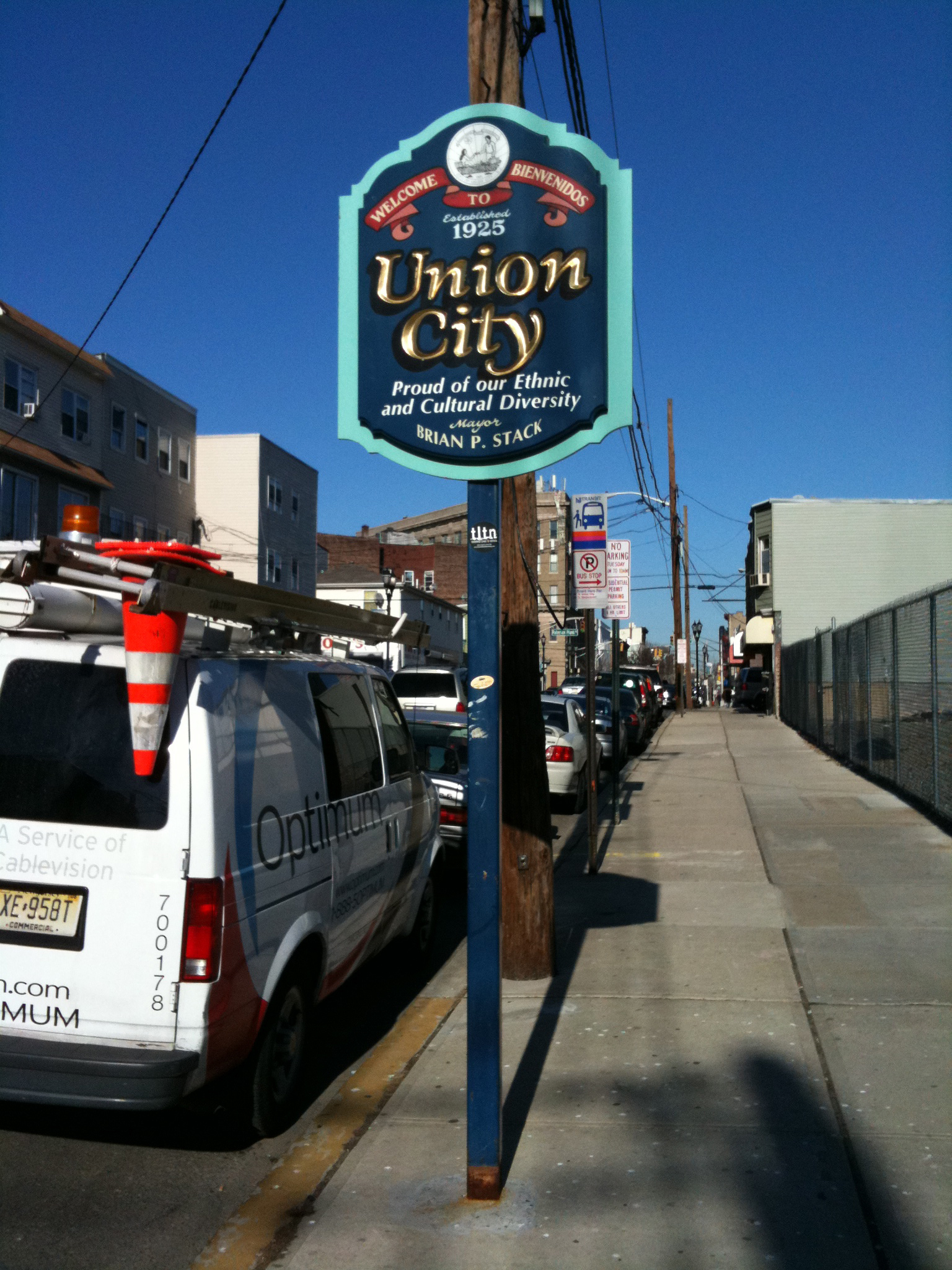
Sign marking Union City's southern border with Jersey City

The area of what is today Union City was originally inhabited by the Munsee-speaking branch of Lenape Native Americans, who wandered into the vast woodland area encountered by Henry Hudson during the voyages he conducted from 1609 to 1610 for the Dutch, who later claimed the area (which included the future New York City) and named it New Netherland. The portion of that land that included the future Hudson County was purchased from members of the Hackensack tribe of the Lenni-Lenape and became part of Pavonia, New Netherland.

The relationship between the early Dutch settlers and Native Americans was marked by frequent armed conflict over land claims. In 1658 by New Netherland colony Director-General Peter Stuyvesant re-purchased the territory. The boundaries of the purchase are described in the deed preserved in the New York State Archives, as well as the medium of exchange: "80 fathoms of wampum, 20 fathoms of cloth, 12 brass kettles, 6 guns, one double brass kettle, 2 blankets, and one half barrel of strong beer." In 1660, he ordered the building of a fortified village at Bergen to protect the area. It was the first permanent European settlement in New Jersey, located in what is now the Journal Square area of Jersey City near Academy Street. In 1664, the British captured New Netherland from the Dutch, at which point the boundaries of Bergen Township encompassed what is now known as Hudson County. North of this was the unpopulated Bergen Woods, which would later be claimed by settlers, after whom a number of Union City streets today are named, including Sipp Street, Brown Street, Golden Lane, Tournade Street and Kerrigan Avenue, which is named after J. Kerrigan, the owner of Kerrigan Farm, who donated the land for Saint Michael's Monastery.

The area that would one day be Union City, however, remained sparsely populated until the early 19th century. The British granted Bergen a new town charter in 1668. In 1682 they created Bergen County, which was named to honor their Dutch predecessors. That county included all of present-day Hudson, Bergen and Passaic counties. Sparsely inhabited during the 17th and 18th centuries, the southeast section of Bergen County had grown by the early 19th century to the point where it was deemed necessary to designate it a separate county. The New Jersey legislature created Hudson County in 1840, and in 1843, it was divided into two townships: Old Bergen Township (which eventually became Jersey City) and North Bergen Township, which was gradually separated into Hudson County's present day municipalities: Hoboken in 1849, Weehawken and Guttenberg in 1859, and West Hoboken and Union Township. West Hoboken was incorporated as a township by an act of the New Jersey Legislature on February 28, 1861, from portions of North Bergen Township. The township was reincorporated on April 6, 1871, and again on March 27, 1874. Portions of the township were ceded to Weehawken in 1879. On June 28, 1884, West Hoboken was reincorporated as a town, based on an ordinance passed nine days earlier. The town was reincorporated on April 24, 1888, based on the results of a referendum passed 12 days earlier. Union Township, or simply Union, was formed in 1864 through the merger of a number of villages, such as Dalleytown, Buck's Corners and Cox's Corners. The largest of these villages, Union Hill, became the colloquial name for the merged town of Union itself. The northern section of Union Township was later incorporated as West New York in 1898. Union City was incorporated on June 1, 1925, by merging the two towns of West Hoboken and Union Hill. The name of one of the city's schools, Union Hill Middle School, recalls the former town.

=== Immigration and industry ===
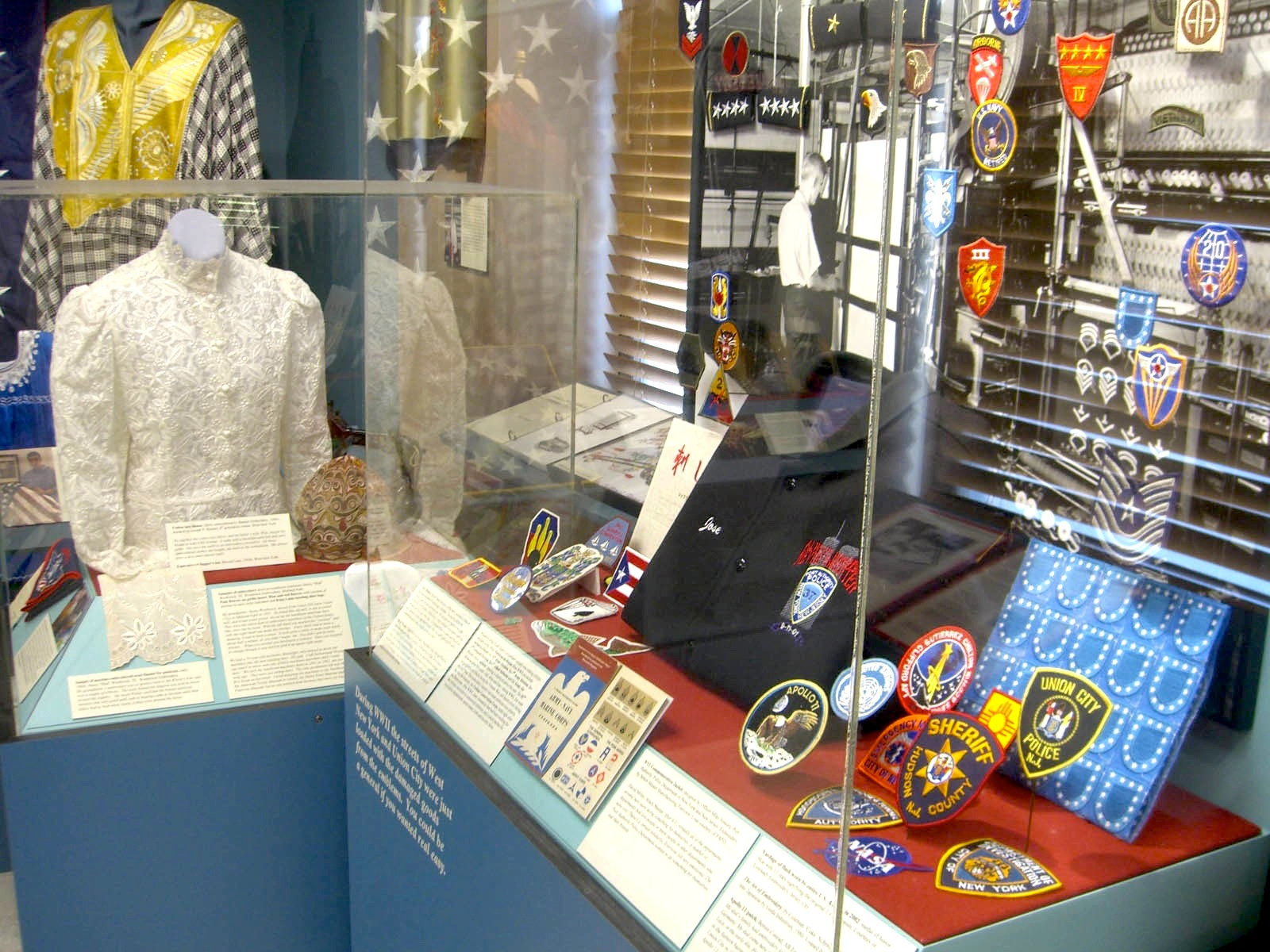
Embroidery and lace exhibit at Union City's Park Performing Arts Center

In the 18th century, Dutch and English merchants first settled the area. Later, German immigrants immigrated from Manhattan. Irish, Polish, Armenians, Syrians, Eastern European Jews and Italians followed. In 1851, Germans moved across the Hudson River from New York City in search of affordable land and open space. During the American Civil War a military installation, Camp Yates, covered an area now bounded by Bergenline and Palisade Avenues from 22nd to 32nd Street. Germans began to settle what would become Union Hill in 1851, and some descendants of the immigrants of this period live in the city today. Although the area's diversity was represented by the more than 19 nationalities that made their home in the Dardanelles (a five-block area of Central Avenue from 23rd Street to 27th Street) from the mid-19th century to the early 20th century, German Americans and Dutch dominated the area. Along with Swiss and Austrian immigrants, they founded the European-style lace making industries for which they were famous. The introduction of Schiffli lace machines in Hudson County made Union City the "embroidery capital of the United States". The trademark of that industry is on the Union City Seal, though foreign competition and austere prevailing fashions led to the decline of embroidery and other industries in the area by the late 1990s. In May 2014 the city dedicated "Embroidery Square" at New York Avenue to commemorate that history.

As immigration to the area progressed throughout the 19th and 20th centuries, Belgians, Armenians, Greeks, Chinese, Jews and Russians found a home in the area, though its domination by Germans by the turn of the 20th century was reflected in the fact that the minutes of town meetings were recorded in German. By this time, the area was witnessing a period of urbanization, as an extensive trolley system was developed by the North Hudson County Railway, spurred by both electrification in 1890 and the arrival of Irish and Italian immigrants, which dominated the city until the late 1960s. Successive waves of immigrants from Eastern Europe, the Near East and Latin America contributed to the embroidery industry in subsequent years. "The Cultural Thread"/"El Hilo", an exhibit highlighting this industry, is on display at Union City's Park Performing Arts Center.

The town was famous for being the home of the rowdy Hudson Burlesque. Theaters in Union City featured vaudeville and burlesque and acts including Fred Astaire and Harry Houdini. It was at a vaudeville theater in Union City that comedian George Burns would meet his longtime partner and wife, Gracie Allen. Union City was also for a time the home to the headquarters of sports publisher Joe Weider. Weider's empire included a Weider Barbell store in Union City, whose patrons included body builder Dave Draper.

The first Cubans immigrated to Union City from New York City in the late 1940s, having been attracted to the city in search of work after hearing of its famed embroidery factories. A majority of these Cubans hailed from small towns or cities, particularly Villa Clara Province in central Cuba. After World War II, veterans relocated to Bergen County, causing a short-lived decline in the population. By the 1960s the city was predominantly an old-line Italian enclave. This began to change when large numbers of Cubans emigrated to the city after Fidel Castro took power in 1962. This made Union City for many years the city with the largest Cuban population in the U.S. after Miami, hence its nickname, "Little Havana on the Hudson." Following the Mariel boatlift in 1980, 10,000 Cubans settled in New Jersey, leading to a second wave of Cubans to Union City, which totaled 15,000 by 1994. The city, as well as neighboring towns such as West New York, experienced a profound cultural impact as a result of this, as seen in such aspects of local culture as its cuisine, fashion, music, entertainment and cigar-making.

Amid a redevelopment boom in the early 1960s, The Troy Towers, a 22-story twin tower luxury apartment complex, was completed in 1966 on the edge of the Palisades cliffs on Mountain Road at 19th Street, at the former site of the Abbey Inn, just north of where a motorized vehicle elevator and a staircase called the Lossburg Steps were located. The former was an angled ramp originally built for horse-drawn carriages, which along with the steps, connected to Hackensack Plank Road beneath the cliffs, in the Shades section of Weehawken. According to the Hudson County Multiple Listing service, between 2016 and 2018 the median list price of residential properties on the market in Union City fluctuated between $345,000 and $509,000. The most expensive home on the market in May 2018 was a four-family building on sale for $1.6 million, while the lowest was a studio apartment in Troy Towers for $148,000. A typical residential property was a six-bedroom, three-family house in need of updating, listed at $568,000.

=== Development in the 21st century ===
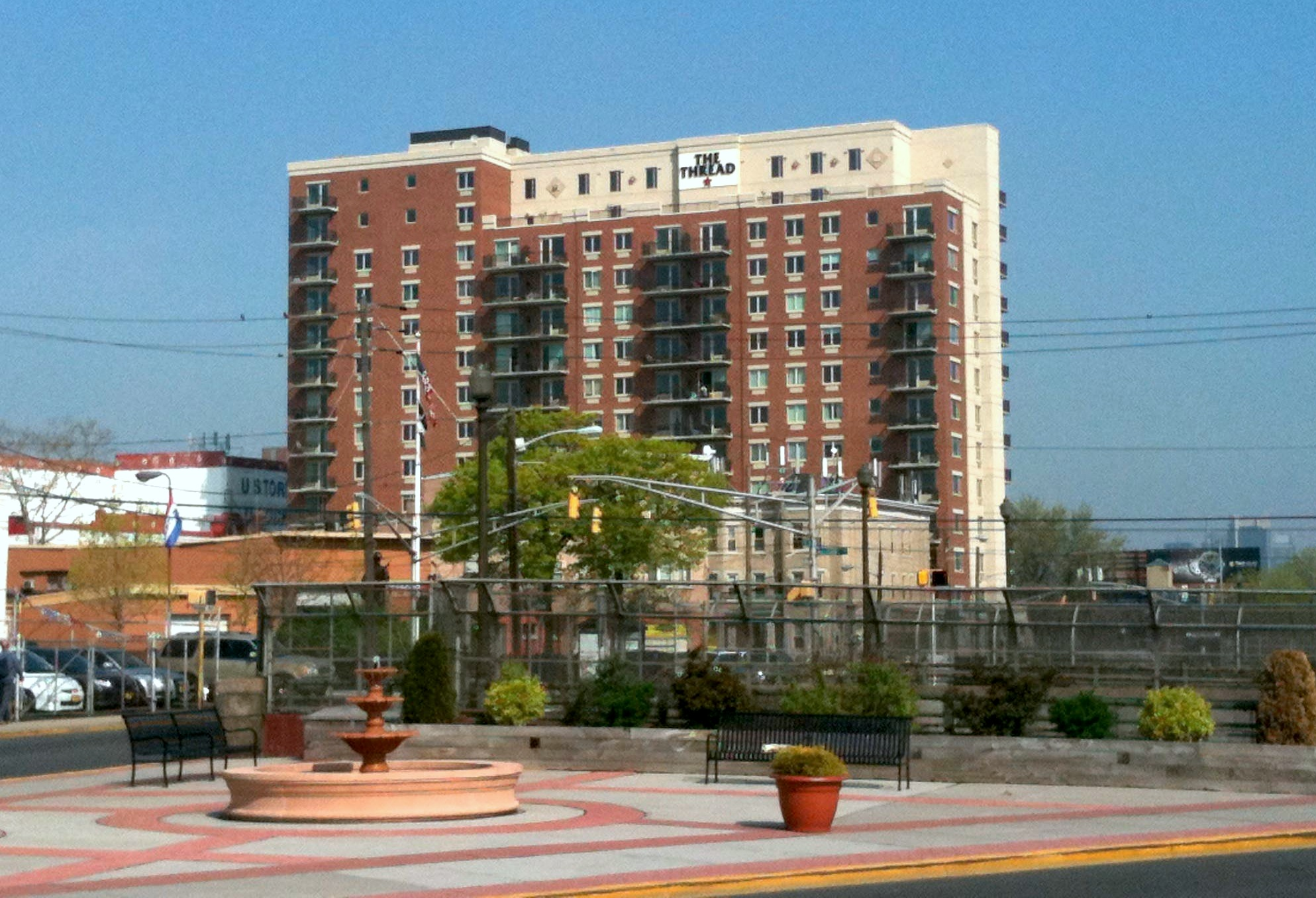
The name of the city's first high-rise condominium tower, the Thread, invokes its historical association with the embroidery industry.

Since its inception in 2000, the Cuban Day Parade of New Jersey became a major annual event in North Hudson, beginning in North Bergen and traveling south to its end in Union City. Union City has historically been a family-oriented city predominantly made up of brownstones, two-family homes and locally owned businesses. Another wave of modestly sized residences began development approximately in 2003, spurred by similar development in neighboring Hoboken, and the city's attempt to attract developers to what had historically been a town unfriendly to them, according to Mayor Brian P. Stack. Through approval of varied construction projects to address the needs of residents of different incomes, improved rent control laws and community input on such issues, this "Hobokenization" resulted in positive comparisons with the redeveloped Hoboken of the mid-to-late 1990s, with new restaurants, bars, and art galleries cited as evidence of renewal. The city recorded $192 million in new construction in 2007, and 600 certificates of occupancy, with 500–700 projected for 2008–2009, compared with previous years, in which 50 certificates was considered a high amount. This development continued for several years, reaching a milestone in 2008 with the completion of Union City's first high-rise condominium tower, The Thread, whose name evokes the city's historical association with the embroidery industry. Other such buildings followed, such as the Altessa, Park City Grand, and Hoboken Heights.

== Geography ==
According to the United States Census Bureau, the city had a total area of 1.29 square miles (3.33 km^{2}), all of which was land. Part of the New York metropolitan area, it is one of the municipalities which comprise North Hudson. Located atop the ridge of the lower Hudson Palisades (just south of the highest point in the county), many of its streets offer glimpses and views of the surrounding municipalities, the New York City skyline, and the New Jersey Meadowlands.

The city is bisected by New Jersey Route 495, a vehicular cut built in conjunction with the Lincoln Tunnel. Soon after its construction, many street names were abandoned in favor of numbering in most of North Hudson starting at 2nd Street, just north of Paterson Plank Road, which runs through the city's only major park and creates its border with Jersey City. 49th Street is the northern boundary with West New York. Apart from a small section between Bergen Turnpike and Weehawken Cemetery, Kennedy Boulevard, a major north–south thoroughfare, creates the western border with North Bergen. A former colonial road and previous border between the merged municipalities takes three names as it diagonally crosses the city's urban grid: Hackensack Plank Road, 32nd Street, and Bergen Turnpike. Most of the city north of the street, formerly Union Hill, shares its eastern border along Park Avenue with Weehawken. The southern section of the city, formerly West Hoboken, is indeed west of Hoboken, which it overlooks and is connected by the road which creates their shared border, the Wing Viaduct.

The city borders the Hudson County municipalities of Hoboken, Jersey City, North Bergen, Weehawken and West New York. It is the only municipality in Hudson County to be entirely surrounded by other county municipalities.

== Demographics ==
Historical population
Census	Pop.	Note	%±
1870	4,640		—
1880	5,849		26.1%
1890	10,643		82.0%
1900	15,187		42.7%
1910	21,023		38.4%
1920	20,651		−1.8%
1930	58,659		184.0%
1940	56,173		−4.2%
1950	55,537		−1.1%
1960	52,180		−6.0%
1970	57,305		9.8%
1980	55,593		−3.0%
1990	58,012		4.4%
2000	67,088		15.6%
2010	66,455		−0.9%
2020	68,589		3.2%
2023 (est.)	64,462		−6.0%
Population sources: 1870–1920 1870 1880–1890; 1890–1910 1870–1930; 1940–2000 2000; 2010 2020

=== Racial and ethnic composition ===
Union City city, New Jersey – Racial and ethnic composition Note: the US Census treats Hispanic/Latino as an ethnic category. This table excludes Latinos from the racial categories and assigns them to a separate category. Hispanics/Latinos may be of any race.
Race / Ethnicity (NH = Non-Hispanic)	Pop 2000	Pop 2010	Pop 2020	% 2000	% 2010	% 2020
White alone (NH)	8,890	7,040	6,855	13.25%	10.59%	9.99%
Black or African American alone (NH)	875	1,070	1,355	1.30%	1.61%	1.98%
Native American or Alaska Native alone (NH)	81	48	99	0.12%	0.07%	0.14%
Asian alone (NH)	1,333	1,447	2,394	1.99%	2.18%	3.49%
Native Hawaiian or Pacific Islander alone (NH)	6	9	7	0.01%	0.01%	0.01%
Other race alone (NH)	158	211	600	0.24%	0.32%	0.87%
Mixed race or Multiracial (NH)	519	339	770	0.77%	0.51%	1.12%
Hispanic or Latino (any race)	55,226	56,291	56,509	82.32%	84.71%	82.39%
Total	67,088	66,455	68,589	100.00%	100.00%	100.00%

=== 20th century ===
According to the 1910 United States census, the population of West Hoboken and Union Hill, the two towns that would later merge to form Union City was 37,000 and 23,000, respectively.

By the late 20th century, Union City emerged as a working class community. One of Hudson County's three homeless shelters, Palisades Emergency Residence Corp. (PERC), is located in Union City. The PERC facility, which includes a soup kitchen, food pantry and 40-bed shelter on 37th Street, lost $100,000 in federal funding in 2011, and in January and August 2012, aided a record-breaking number of guests.

=== 2020 census ===
As of the 2020 census, Union City had a population of 68,589. The median age was 35.9 years. 22.6% of residents were under the age of 18 and 11.8% of residents were 65 years of age or older. For every 100 females there were 96.9 males, and for every 100 females age 18 and over there were 94.8 males age 18 and over.

100.0% of residents lived in urban areas, while 0.0% lived in rural areas.

There were 24,511 households in Union City, of which 35.9% had children under the age of 18 living in them. Of all households, 34.3% were married-couple households, 22.1% were households with a male householder and no spouse or partner present, and 34.3% were households with a female householder and no spouse or partner present. About 25.2% of all households were made up of individuals and 8.4% had someone living alone who was 65 years of age or older.

There were 26,455 housing units, of which 7.3% were vacant. The homeowner vacancy rate was 1.9% and the rental vacancy rate was 3.8%.

Racial composition as of the 2020 census
Race	Number	Percent
White	14,189	20.7%
Black or African American	2,340	3.4%
American Indian and Alaska Native	1,647	2.4%
Asian	2,508	3.7%
Native Hawaiian and Other Pacific Islander	28	0.0%
Some other race	31,944	46.6%
Two or more races	15,933	23.2%
Hispanic or Latino (of any race)	56,509	82.4%

=== 2010 census ===
Union City's 2010 population of 66,455 made it the state's 17th largest municipality, having seen a decline of 633 residents (-0.9%) from its population of 67,088 in the 2000 census, when it was the state's 16th most populous municipality. As of 2010, it was still the country's second-most densely populated incorporated municipality (after the nearby Town of Guttenberg) and the most densely populated U.S. city.

The 2010 United States census counted 66,455 people, 22,814 households, and 15,514 families in the city. The population density was 51,810.1 per square mile (20,004.0/km^{2}). There were 24,931 housing units at an average density of 19,436.9 per square mile (7,504.6/km^{2}). The racial makeup was 58.01% (38,549) White, 5.25% (3,487) Black or African American, 1.23% (819) Native American, 2.39% (1,587) Asian, 0.05% (33) Pacific Islander, 27.43% (18,231) from other races, and 5.64% (3,749) from two or more races. Hispanic or Latino of any race were 84.71% (56,291) of the population. As of 2010, the city had the highest percentage of Hispanic residents in any municipality in New Jersey.

Of the 22,814 households, 34.2% had children under the age of 18; 36.7% were married couples living together; 21.8% had a female householder with no husband present and 32.0% were non-families. Of all households, 23.8% were made up of individuals and 7.5% had someone living alone who was 65 years of age or older. The average household size was 2.88 and the average family size was 3.39.

23.7% of the population were under the age of 18, 10.6% from 18 to 24, 32.4% from 25 to 44, 22.8% from 45 to 64, and 10.5% who were 65 years of age or older. The median age was 33.9 years. For every 100 females, the population had 100.4 males. For every 100 females ages 18 and older there were 98.3 males.

Of Union City's 24,931 housing units in 2010 (up 1,190 from the 2000 Census), 2,117 of them, or 8%, were vacant, twice the vacancy rate of the 2000 Census.

The Census Bureau's 2006–2010 American Community Survey showed that (in 2010 inflation-adjusted dollars) median household income was $40,173 (with a margin of error of +/− $1,946) and the median family income was $43,101 (+/− $2,185). Males had a median income of $31,987 (+/− $1,696) versus $25,010 (+/− $1,517) for females. The per capita income for the city was $18,506 (+/− $719). About 17.0% of families and 20.0% of the population were below the poverty line, including 29.4% of those under age 18 and 20.8% of those age 65 or over.

Hispanics remained the dominant ethnic group in the city, and their percentage of the population increased from 82.3% in the 2000 Census to 84.7% in the 2010 Census. Non-Hispanic whites made up 15.3% of the city's population in 2010; up from 13.3% in the 2000 Census. Blacks made up 5.2% of the city's population in 2010; up from 3.3% in the 2000 Census. The rest of the racial makeup of the city was 0.70% Native American, 2.15% Asian, 0.08% Pacific Islander, 28.19% from other races, and 6.87% from two or more races. Though Native Americans comprise less than 1% of the city's population, they doubled between the 2000 and 2010 Census, and combined with West New York's Native Americans, comprise 38% of the county's Native American population. Spanish was spoken at home by more than half of the residents of Union City, according to U.S. Census Bureau data released in 2017.

=== 2000 Census ===
According to the 2000 United States census, Union City had a population of 67,088, making it the second-most populous municipality in the county after Jersey City.

The population density was 52,977.8 inhabitants per square mile (20,454.8/km^{2}) in 2000, approximately twice as high as New York City as a whole, but less than Manhattan alone. Union City is the most densely populated city in the United States, though neighboring Guttenberg (legally incorporated as a town) was more densely populated. In 2000, the median age was 32 years. For every 100 females, there were 100.6 males. For every 100 females age 18 and over, there were 98.8 males.

As of the 2000 Census, 58.7% of the population was foreign born and 21.6% of residents were naturalized citizens, while 13.9% only speak English at home, whereas 80.7% reported that they spoke Spanish at home. As of the 2000 Census, 17% of the city's employed residents worked in New York City.

=== Recent estimates ===
As of July 2019, Union City's employment breakdown was: 7.8% Construction; 9.6% Manufacturing; 4.4% Wholesale trade; 12.3% Retail; 9.4% Transportation and warehousing; 0.4% Utilities; 1.8% Information; 3.7% Finance and insurance; 2.1% Real estate, rental, leasing; 4.1% Professional, scientific, technical services; 8.2% Administrative, support, waste management; 5.2% Educational services; 10.1% Health care and social assistance; 2.1% Arts, entertainment, recreation; 11.0% Accommodation, food services; 5.7% Other services; and 2.1% Public administration.

As of July 2019, 71.5% of residents age 25 or older had completed high school or a higher level of education, and 21.6% had a bachelor's degree or higher degree of education.

As of May 2017, the average income of a Union City resident was $19,834 a year, and the compared to a national average of $28,555 a year. The median household income of a Union City resident is $40,939 a year, compared to the national median of is $53,482. By July 2019, the median household income was $48,992.

In the 2000s, the Brookings Institution studies ranked Union City among the 92 most economically depressed localities in the United States, with 18.1% of the population and 27.5% of the children falling below the poverty line. In 1997, the New Jersey Municipal Distress Index, which is based on social, economic, fiscal and physical indicators, ranked Union City as the third most distressed community in the state. By July 2019, 19.6% of residents lived in poverty.

=== The Latino and Hispanic community ===
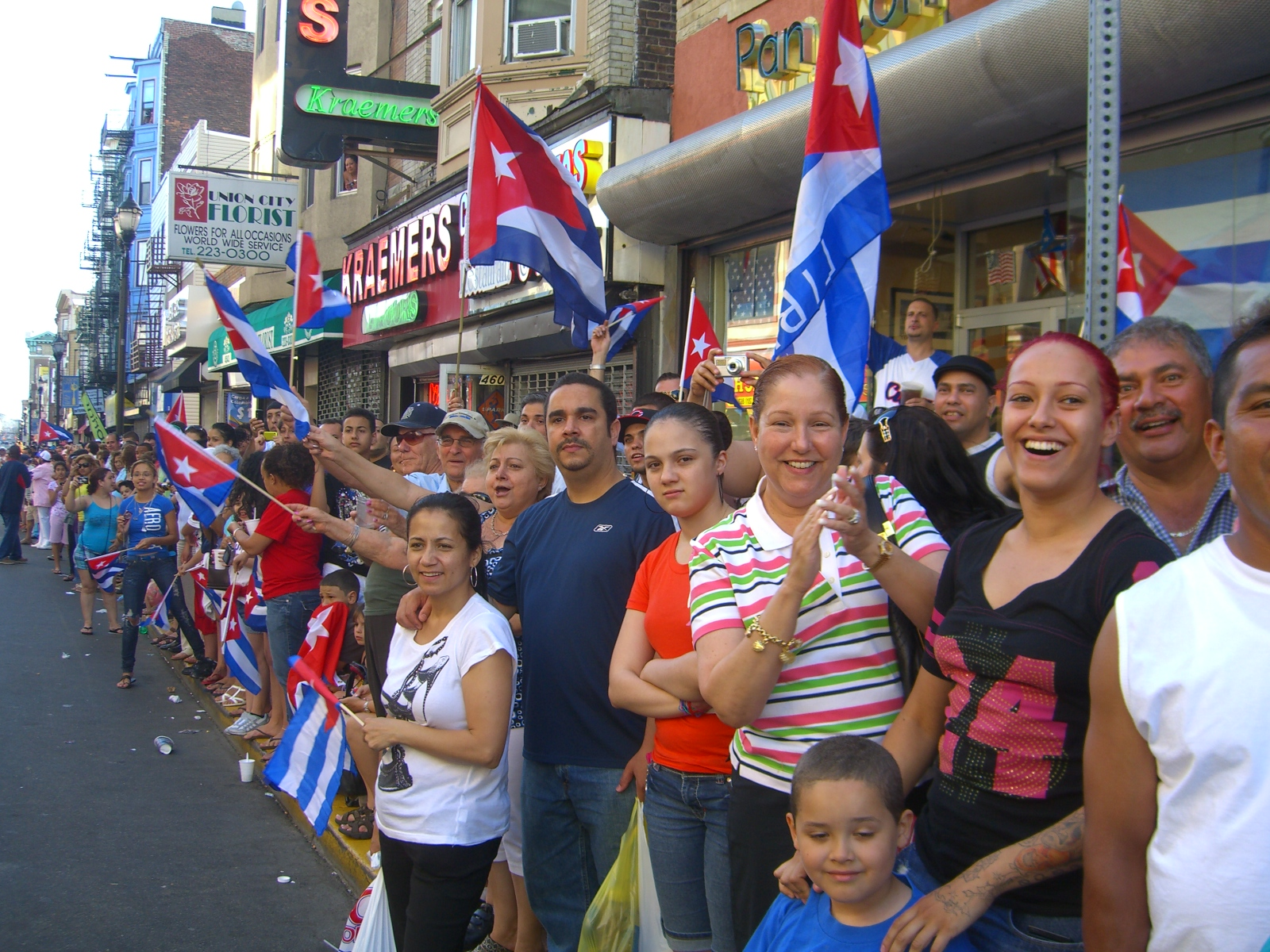
Revelers during the 2010 Cuban Day Parade on Bergenline Avenue

Immigration from Cuba to Union City began slowly in the late 1940s and early 1950s, when jobs in the local embroidery and textile factories were abundant. By 1955, the city's Cuban population was large enough that Fidel Castro visited Union City to raise money for his revolt against Cuban dictator Fulgencio Batista, though a speech he gave one night at a bar on 26th Street, Le Molino Rojo ("The Red Mill") led to a brawl that resulted in Castro's arrest.

Following the Cuban Revolution of 1959, large numbers of Cubans in professional occupations emigrated to Union City, resulting in Union City's status as the nation's second-largest Cuban population, behind Miami, Florida, leading to the nickname "Little Havana on the Hudson". Aspects of the enclave are explored in the 2009 publication The Cubans of Union City: Immigrants and Exiles in a New Jersey Community.

In the ensuing decades, Cuban residents spread out to other communities of North Hudson County. West New York, at 19.64%, now has the highest percentage of Cubans in New Jersey, with Union City in second place, with 15.35%. These two municipalities have the highest Cuban population percentage in the United States outside of Florida. Moreover, Union City still boasts the largest Hispanic population percentage in New Jersey, at 84.7% by the 2010 Census.

By the early 2000s Union City had become a mix of the Latin and Asian diasporas, with Dominicans cited as the fastest-growing ethnic group, and other groups including Colombians, Ecuadoreans and Salvadorans. Despite the decline in the size of the Cuban population, the major New York City television news outlets will often journey to Union City to interview citizens when developments in Cuba–United States relations occur.

As of the 2000 Census, 5.94% of Union City's residents identified themselves as being of Ecuadorian ancestry, which was the third highest of any municipality in New Jersey and the seventh highest percentage of Ecuadorian people in any place in the United States with 1,000 or more residents identifying their ancestry. That number increased to 12.6%, according to December 2017 Census figures.

== Parks and recreation ==
Washington Park, which covers 22 acres (8.9 ha) straddling the border of the city and The Heights neighborhood in Jersey City, is part of the Hudson County Park System. Previously a flat expanse of dirt, it had been used to host visiting carnivals, circuses, and Wild West shows, including Buffalo Bill's Wild West show, performed there in 1908, when the plot was called the North Street Grounds. A movement to develop it into a park began in 1909, though this would not come into fruition until 1917, and the park took its current shape in the 1930s, partially as a result of the input of the Works Progress Administration. Among its features is Wave, a 14 feet (4.3 m) high, 35 feet (11 m) wide brushed stainless steel sculpture by Chakaia Booker that was installed in 2008.

Reservoir Park, located around Hackensack Reservoir on Palisade Avenue between 20th and 22nd Streets, opened on September 25, 2015. The passive park, at the city border in Weehawken, was created on the 14.4-acre (5.8 ha) site of a reservoir that had been owned by United Water but had not been used since 1996.

== Commerce and economy ==
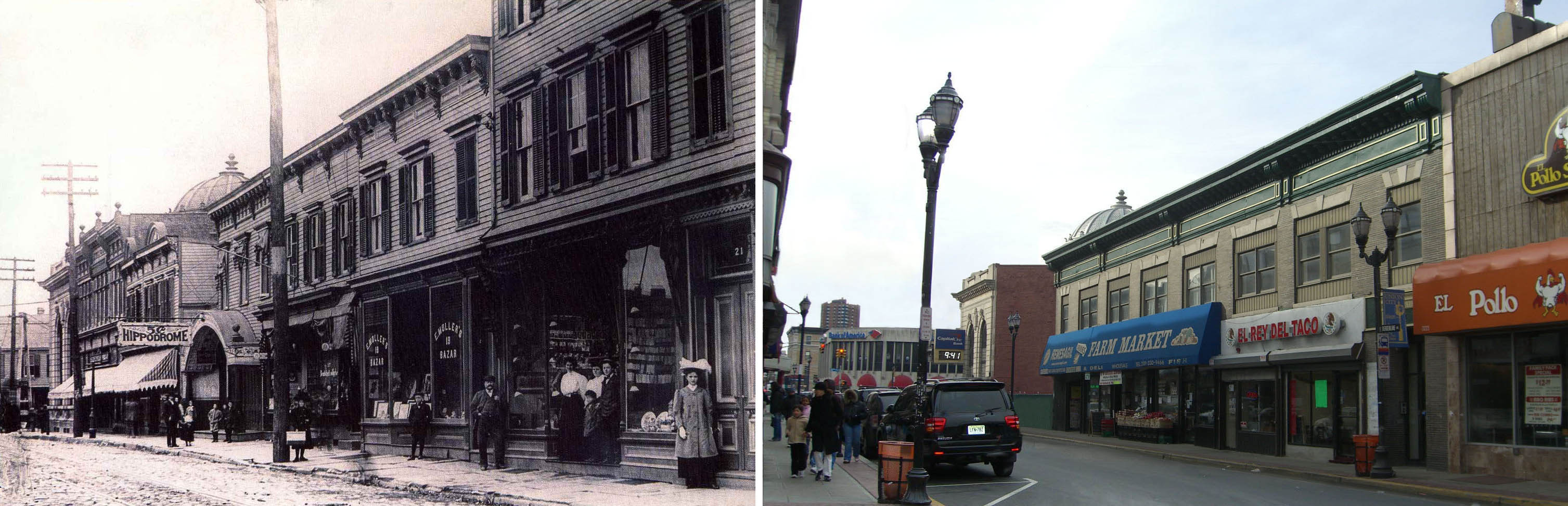
Bergenline Avenue then and now: Facing south toward 32nd Street, c. 1900 (left), and in 2010 (right)

Originally, Bergenline Avenue was the width of a cowpath, and was not regarded as a business center. Street car tracks were expected to be laid on Palisade Avenue where the Town Hall was located. However, an influential citizen named Henry Kohlmeier, who had just built his residence on Palisade Avenue, did not wish to be disturbed by the noise of the passing cars, and proposed that the tracks be laid on Bergenline Avenue, two blocks to the west, and before those who would have objected to this became aware of this change, the motion was approved.

The continuous line of retail stores that appeared on Bergenline Avenue by the time the town of Union Hill was incorporated made it not only the city's main commercial thoroughfare, but a major shopping thoroughfare for North Hudson County, one of the leading shopping centers and commercial strips in Northern New Jersey, and the longest commercial avenue in the state. Among the Cuban Americans in the area, it has earned the nickname La Avenida.

Bergenline runs through not only the entire length of Union City from north to south, but also through West New York, Guttenberg and North Bergen. Also known as the "Miracle Mile", Bergenline's largest concentration of retail and chain stores begins at the intersection of 32nd Street and continues north until 92nd Street in North Bergen, and while it is a narrow one-way, southbound street throughout most of Union City, it becomes a four lane, two-way street at 48th Street, one block south of the town's northern boundary. Bergenline Avenue is also used as the route for local parades, such as the annual Memorial Day Parade.

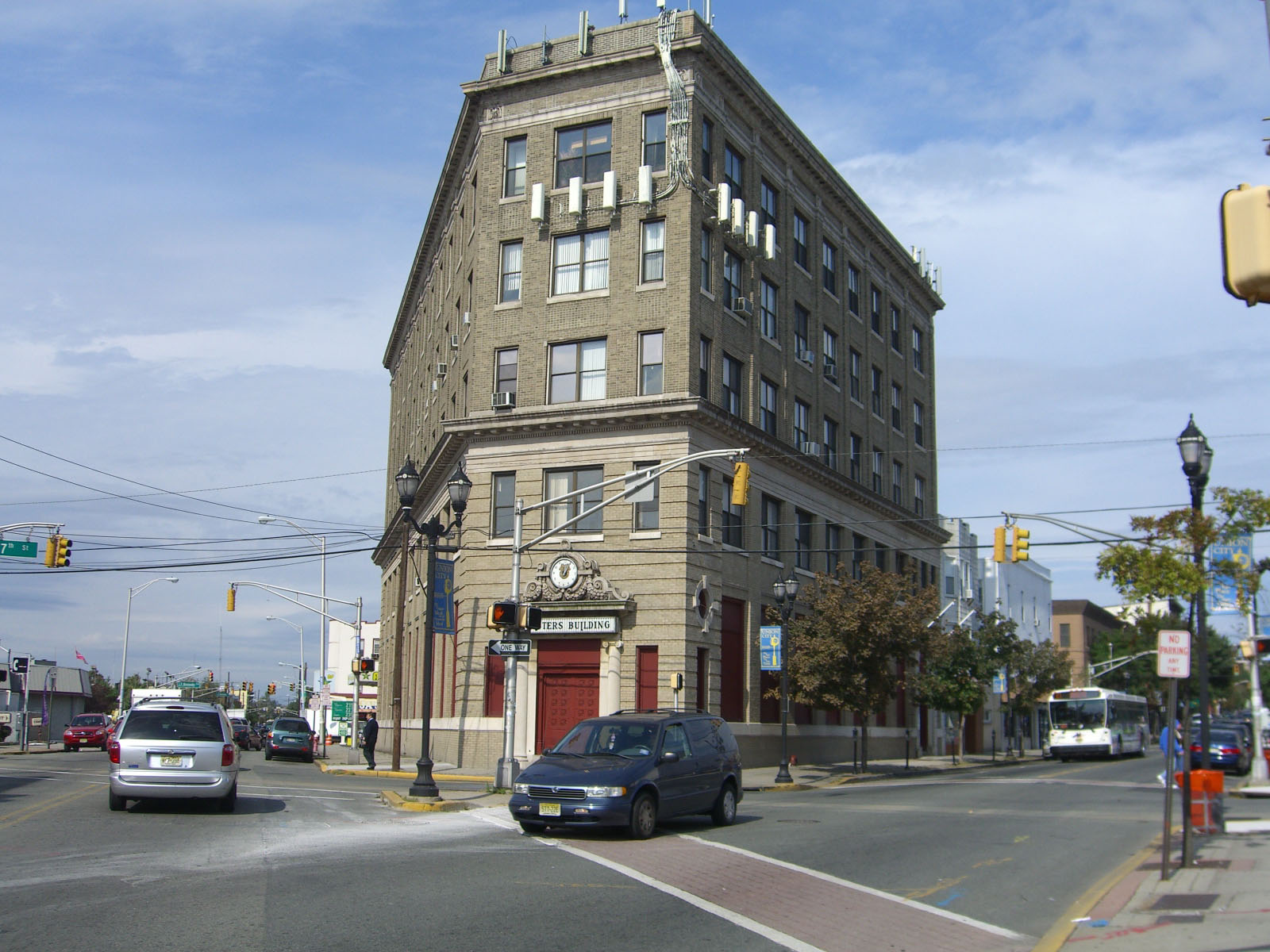
Transfer Station was once an interchange for trolleys and buses. The trapezoidal building at 707 Summit Avenue was home to a bank, and later the headquarters of Teamsters Local 560 when it was led by mobster Anthony "Tony Pro" Provenzano, before being purchased in by the city in 2023 to convert into affordable housing.

At Union City's southern end, Bergenline is primarily a residential street, with the shopping district concentrated at Summit Avenue and Transfer Station, so called because it was a transfer point for buses and three trolley lines. A prominent landmark of Transfer Station is its five-corner intersection of Summit Avenue, Paterson Plank Road, and 7th Street, on which sits a five-story, trapezoid-shaped brick building at 707 Summit Avenue, originated in 1910 as the National Bank of North Hudson. It later became the First National Bank of Union City. By the 1960s, it had become the headquarters of Teamsters Local 560, which was controlled by mobster Anthony "Tony Pro" Provenzano, a reported caporegime in the Genovese crime family, and a top associate of Jimmy Hoffa. On July 30, 1975, Hoffa intended to meet Provenzano in Bloomfield Township, a suburb of Detroit, but Hoffa famously disappeared that afternoon. According to Time, Provenzano was seen fraternizing with local union members in Hoboken, although Provenzano, according to the Associated Press, told investigators that "he was playing cards with Stephen Andretta in Union City, New Jersey the day Hoffa disappeared", and denied having arranged any meeting with Hoffa. In 2023, when the building went on sale, the city planned to purchase it for $3.1 million, and convert it into 24 affordable housing units.

Transfer Station was also the site, in 1912, of the first lunch wagon built by Jerry and Daniel O'Mahoney and John Hanf, which was bought for $800 and operated by restaurant entrepreneur Michael Griffin, who chose the location for its copious foot traffic. The wagon helped spark New Jersey's so-called "golden age of diner manufacturing", which in turn made the state the informal "diner capital of the world". In the decades that followed, nearly all major U.S. diner manufacturers, including Jerry O'Mahoney Inc., started in New Jersey. During World War II, the area was a 24-hour hotspot for U.S. servicemen, who patronized the dozens of nightclubs located there. In later decades, Summit Avenue was not as busy a shopping area as upper Bergenline, so the city implemented a series of improvements in 2009 to improve business there, such as improved sidewalks, landscaping and street lights from Seventh Street to 13th Street.

In terms of business, Union City is notable for being the location where Mallomars were first sold. Nabisco sold them to a grocer in the southern half of the town, when it was West Hoboken.

Union City is one of several cities in Hudson County that contains a state-established Urban Enterprise Zone (UEZ), under a program that was implemented in 1983 by the New Jersey Department of Commerce and Economic Development assist businesses and revitalize economically distressed communities in New Jersey. One of 32 zones covering 37 municipalities statewide, Union City was selected in 1994 as one of a group of 10 zones added to participate in the program and one of four of those chosen based on a competition. In addition to other benefits to encourage employment and investment within the UEZ, shoppers can take advantage of a reduced 3.3125% sales tax rate (half of the 6 5/8% rate charged statewide) at eligible merchants. Established in April 1995, the city's Urban Enterprise Zone status expires in April 2026. There are approximately 180 UEZ-certified businesses in the city, which includes Bergenline Avenue from 49th to 15th Streets, 32nd Street from Bergenline Avenue to Kennedy Boulevard, Summit Avenue from 18th to Fifth Street, and Paterson Plank Road from Fifth to Seventh Streets. In addition to providing an incentive for shoppers and for business owners to invest in the area without raising taxes, up to $30,000 in annual UEZ revenue is also used for area upkeep and safety projects, marketing campaigns, and holiday decorations.

According to the U.S. Bureau of Labor Statistics, Union City's unemployment rate as of September 2009 was 15%, the highest in the state, compared with the lowest, Hoboken, at 6.3%, and a statewide rate of 9.8%. By 2018, the city's unemployment rate was 4.5%, compared to a rate of 3.9% in Hudson County.

== Government ==
=== Local government ===
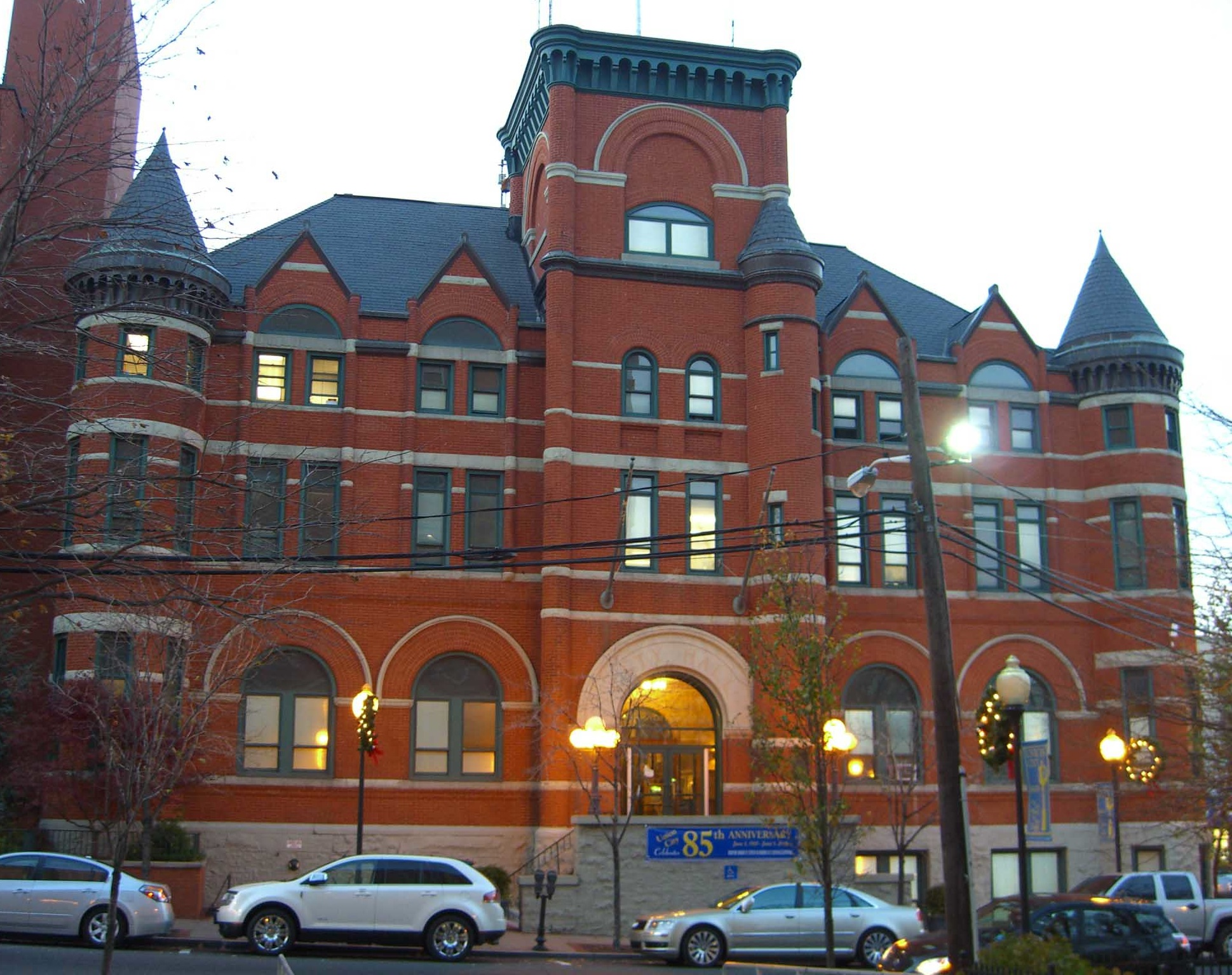
City Hall

Union City's City Hall is located at 3715 Palisade Avenue. The oldest municipal building in North Hudson, it was built in the 1890s as the town hall for Union Hill. Prior to the 1914 opening of Union Hill High School, classes were also held in the building. After the 1925 consolidation of West Hoboken and Union Hill into Union City, the town hall for the former was converted into the new fire headquarters for the city. It also served as the second police precinct for many years.

The governing body is comprised of a five-member Board of Commissioners, as per the city's Walsh Act form of government, which has been in place since 1930. The members of the commission are elected at-large on a non-partisan basis in the May municipal election. At a reorganization meeting held after the election, each commissioner is assigned a department to oversee. The mayor of Union City also serves as a commissioner. The city is one of 30 municipalities (of the 564) statewide that use this form.

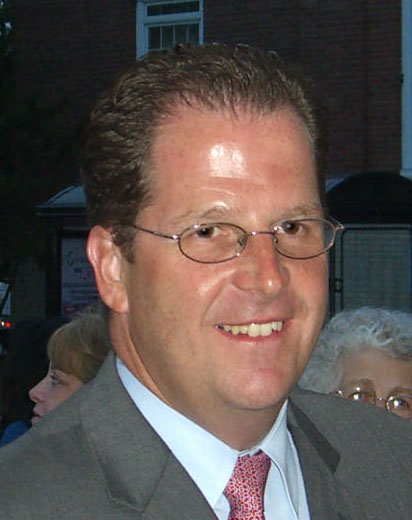
Mayor Brian P. Stack also serves as state senator.

As of 2026, the mayor of Union City is Brian P. Stack, who became mayor in 2000 after a recall election forced the resignation of then-mayor Raúl "Rudy" Garcia. The five members of the Union City Board of Commissioners serve in both administrative and legislative capacities, with each commissioner acting as the director of one of the five major departments of the city, administering the daily operations of a designated department. The five commissioners and their departmental assignments are Mayor Brian P. Stack (Commissioner of Public Safety), Lucio P. Fernandez (Commissioner of Public Affairs), Wendy A. Grullon (Commissioner of Public Works), Maryury A. Martinetti (Commissioner of Revenue and Finance) and Celin J. Valdivia (Commissioner of Parks and Public Property), all serving concurrent terms ending on May 15, 2030. The 2026 municipal election had no challengers on the ballot, but nearly a third of registered voters showed up to support the slate.

The budget adopted by the city in 2021 was $151 million, which remained balanced during the COVID-19 pandemic.

=== Public safety ===
The Union City Police Department consists of over 200 officers. Union City's Chief of Police is Nichelle Luster, the city's first female Police Chief, who replaced former Chief Richard Molinari. Luster had been a captain since 2013, when she became the first female to attain that position.

Until 1999, the Union City Fire Department consisted of 100 firefighters, and four fire stations. In January 1999 Union City and four other cities in North Hudson merged their fire departments into North Hudson Regional Fire and Rescue. The other municipalities include Guttenberg, North Bergen, Weehawken and West New York. Three of the NHRFR's fire stations are located in Union City:

- Battalion 1 / Squad 2 / Ladder 1 – 1600 New York Avenue
- Deputy 1 / Engine 4 – 541–29th Street
- Battalion 2 / Rescue 1 / Squad 1 – 4300 Kennedy Boulevard

=== Federal, state, and county representation ===
==== New Jersey Legislature ====
Union City is located in New Jersey's 33rd legislative district. It is represented by two assembly members and one senator in the New Jersey Legislature.

New Jersey Senate
District	Name	Assumed office	Party affiliation
33	Brian P. Stack	2008	Democratic

New Jersey General Assembly
District	Name	Assumed office	Party affiliation
33	Gabe Rodriguez	2024	Democratic
33	Larry Wainstein	2026	Democratic

==== Hudson County ====
Union City is located in Hudson County. The county is governed by the directly elected Hudson County Executive, Democrat Craig Guy, and by a Board of County Commissioners, which serves as the county's legislative body.

==== United States Congress ====
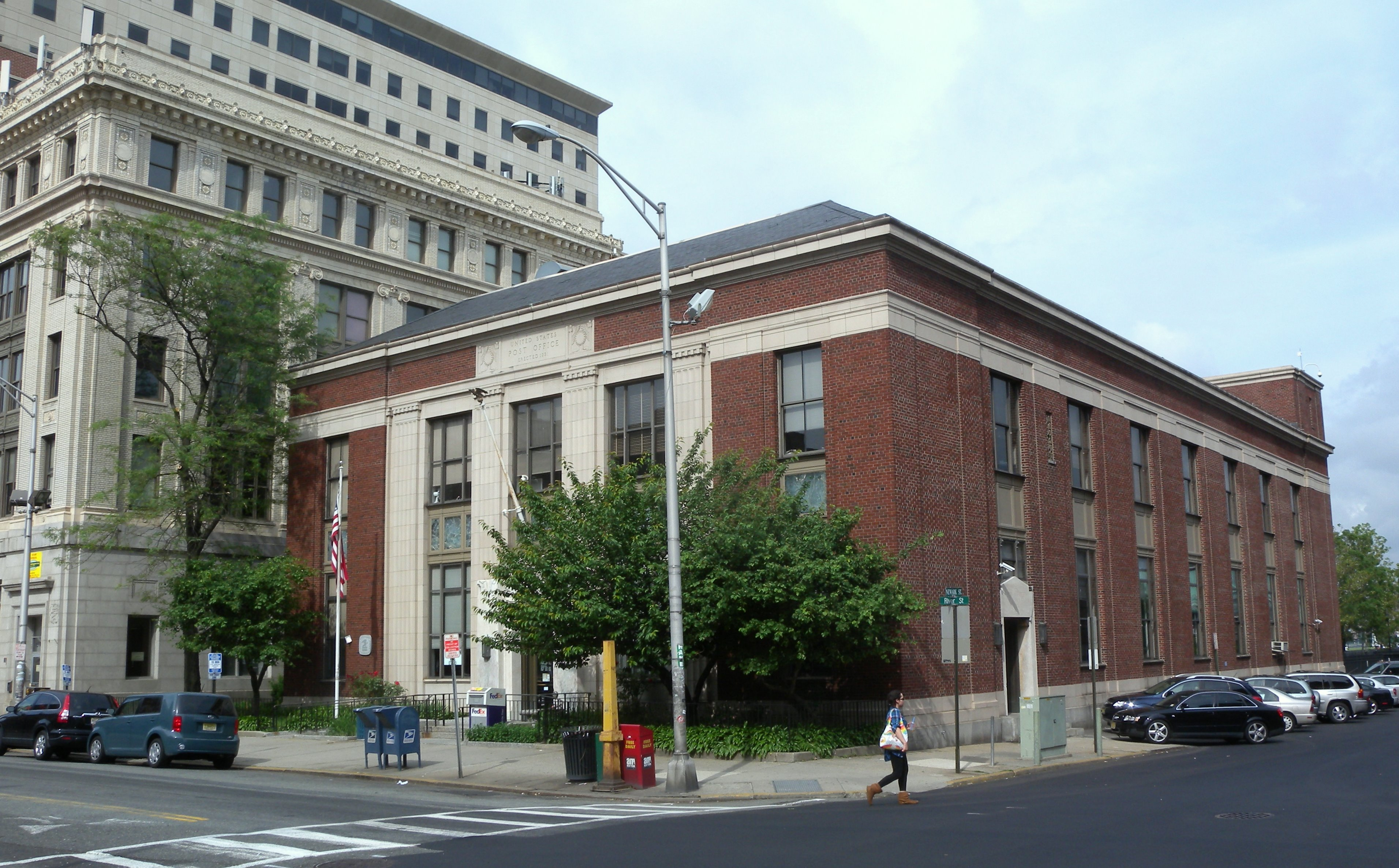
Hoboken Post Office

Union City lies within New Jersey's 8th congressional district and is represented by Democrat Rob Menendez in the United States House of Representatives. It is represented by Democrats Cory Booker and Andy Kim in the United States Senate.

=== Politics ===
As of March 2011, there were a total of 28,503 registered voters in Union City, of which 18,589 (65.2%) were registered as Democrats, 1,839 (6.5%) were registered as Republicans and 8,062 (28.3%) were registered as Unaffiliated. There were 13 voters registered to other parties.

Gubernatorial election results for Union City
Year	Republican		Democratic		Third party(ies)	
Year	No.	%	No.	%	No.	%
2025	2,431	15.08%	13,616	84.44%	78	0.48%
2021	1,913	14.57%	11,151	84.91%	68	0.52%
2017	1,058	8.83%	10,808	90.22%	114	0.95%
2013	6,653	58.09%	4,651	40.61%	148	1.29%
2009	2,265	20.37%	8,611	77.46%	241	2.17%
2005	2,459	20.12%	9,385	76.79%	378	3.09%

In the 2012 presidential election, Democrat Barack Obama received 82.1% of the vote (14,569 cast), ahead of Republican Mitt Romney with 17.2% (3,050 votes), and other candidates with 0.8% (134 votes), among the 17,893 ballots cast by the city's 30,841 registered voters (140 ballots were spoiled), for a turnout of 58.0%. In the 2008 presidential election, Democrat Barack Obama received 74.6% of the vote (13,657 cast), ahead of Republican John McCain with 23.9% (4,366 votes) and other candidates with 0.8% (150 votes), among the 18,305 ballots cast by the city's 32,030 registered voters, for a turnout of 57.1%. In the 2004 presidential election, Democrat John Kerry received 64.8% of the vote here (10,894 ballots cast), outpolling Republican George W. Bush with 32.0% (5,375 votes) and other candidates with 0.3% (90 votes), among the 16,811 ballots cast by the city's 27,727 registered voters, for a turnout percentage of 60.6.

Presidential elections results
Year	Republican	Democratic	Third Parties
2024	40.3% 7,881	57.3% 11,202	2.7% 417
2020	27.5% 5,556	71.6% 14,474	0.9% 172
2016	18.5% 3,322	78.5% 14,127	2.6% 463
2012	17.2% 3,050	82.1% 14,569	0.8% 134
2008	23.9% 4,366	74.6% 13,657	0.8% 150
2004	32.0% 5,375	64.8% 10,894	0.3% 90

In the 2013 gubernatorial election, Republican Chris Christie received 58.1% of the vote (6,653 cast), ahead of Democrat Barbara Buono with 40.6% (4,651 votes), and other candidates with 1.3% (148 votes), among the 12,583 ballots cast by the city's 31,515 registered voters (1,131 ballots were spoiled), for a turnout of 39.9%. In the 2009 gubernatorial election, Democrat Jon Corzine received 76.8% of the vote here (8,611 ballots cast), ahead of Republican Chris Christie with 20.2% (2,265 votes), Independent Chris Daggett with 1.4% (152 votes) and other candidates with 0.8% (89 votes), among the 11,218 ballots cast by the city's 27,373 registered voters, yielding a 41.0% turnout.

United States Senate election results for Union City1
Year	Republican		Democratic		Third party(ies)	
Year	No.	%	No.	%	No.	%
2024	5,958	34.60%	10,735	62.34%	528	3.07%
2018	2,443	15.59%	12,914	82.40%	315	2.01%
2012	2,169	13.18%	14,094	85.65%	192	1.17%
2006	2,267	17.82%	10,348	81.33%	108	0.85%

United States Senate election results for Union City2
Year	Republican		Democratic		Third party(ies)	
Year	No.	%	No.	%	No.	%
2020	4,438	22.98%	14,410	74.61%	466	2.41%
2014	1,363	13.50%	8,633	85.48%	103	1.02%
2013	844	15.54%	4,480	82.49%	107	1.97%
2008	3,319	21.88%	11,585	76.36%	268	1.77%

== Transportation ==
=== Roads and highways ===
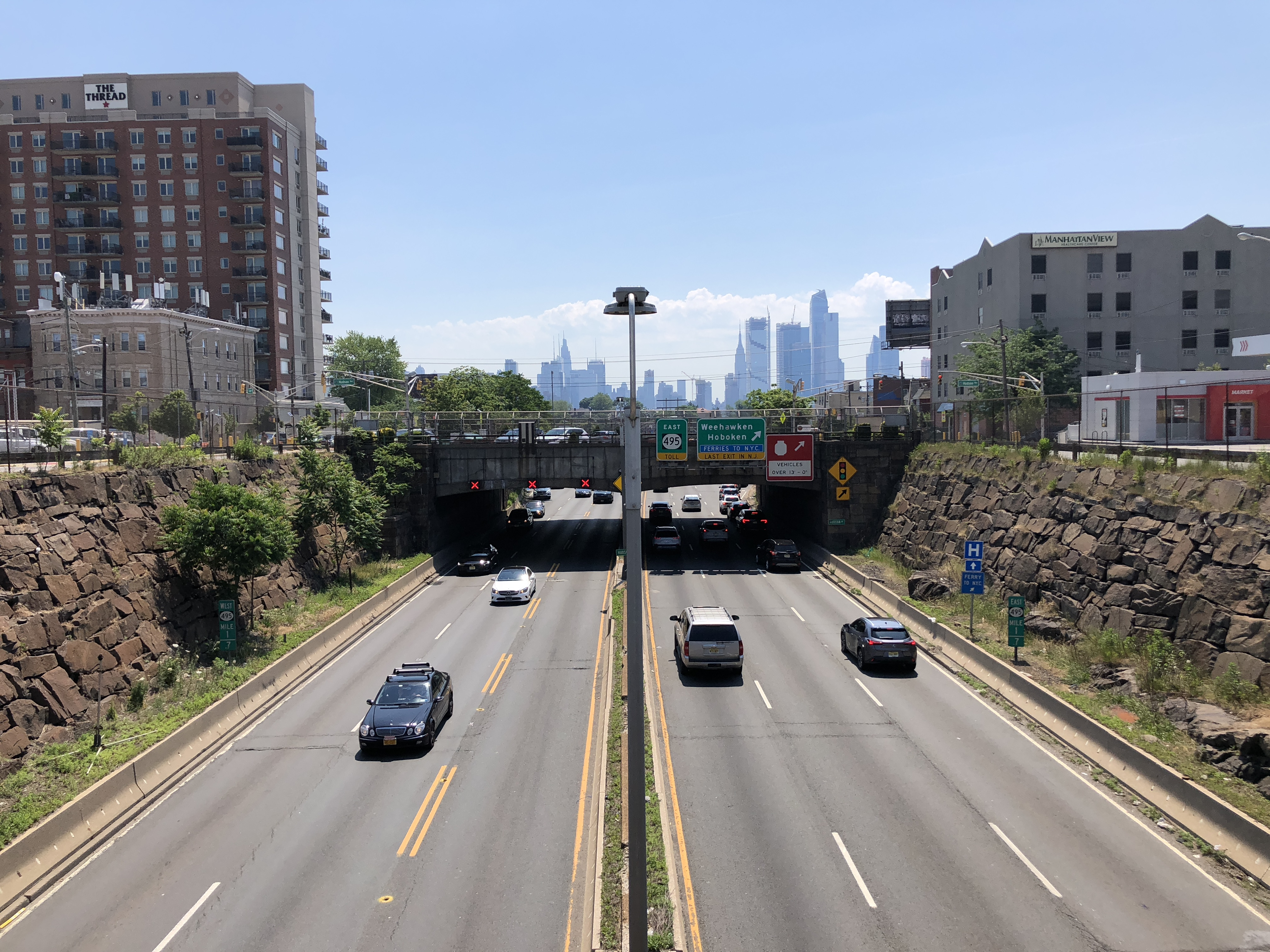
View east along Route 495 in Union City

As of 2010, the city had a total of 41.67 miles (67.06 km) of roadways, of which 37.46 miles (60.29 km) were maintained by the municipality, 3.42 miles (5.50 km) by Hudson County and 0.64 miles (1.03 km) by the New Jersey Department of Transportation and 0.15 miles (0.24 km) by the New Jersey Turnpike Authority.

Several major roadways traverse Union City. New Jersey Route 495 is the most significant highway passing through, connecting directly to the Lincoln Tunnel into New York City. To the west, it connects with, Interstate 95 (the New Jersey Turnpike), U.S. Route 1/9 and New Jersey Route 3. County Route 505 also passes through the city. Within the city, Bergenline Avenue and the marginal highway of Route 495 are major public transportation corridors.

=== Public transportation ===
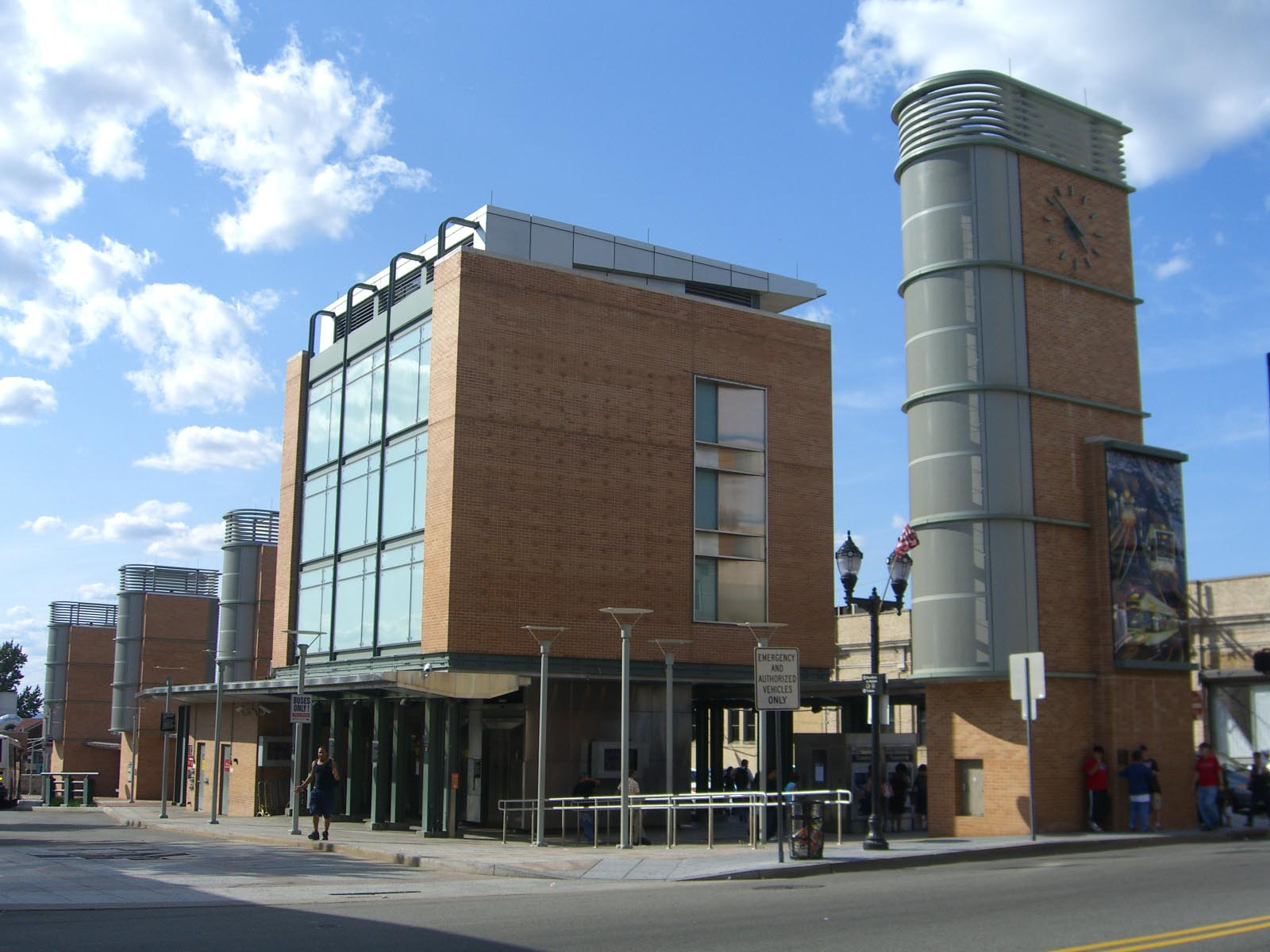
The Hudson-Bergen Light Rail station on Bergenline Avenue at 48th Street

The Bergenline Avenue station of the Hudson-Bergen Light Rail is located at 49th Street near the city line with West New York and North Bergen.

New Jersey Transit bus service transportation is available to points in Hudson, Bergen, and Passaic counties and to the Port Authority Bus Terminal in Midtown Manhattan. Routes which stop in the city are the 111, 121, 123, 124, 125, 127, 129, 154, 156, 159, 144, 190 (and the 107, 108, 160, 161, 163, 167, 191, 192 by passenger request for travel to the Port Authority Bus Terminal only), and the 195 (Saturdays only). The George Washington Bridge Bus Terminal is served by the 181. Jersey City can be reached on the 22, 82, 83, 84, 85, 86, 88 and 89 routes.

OurBus routes link Union City to Washington, D.C. Uptown Vans has routes to the Poconos (Stroudsburg - Scranton - Wilkes-Barre corridor) and Lehigh Valley (Easton - Allentown - Reading corridor).

Additional public transportation service is augmented by privately operated dollar vans that link Union City to various points throughout the New York metropolitan area, such as the Hudson County Courthouse, Newport Mall, 42nd Street in Manhattan, and Paterson, New Jersey. The minibuses, locally known by their Spanish language name guagua, have come subject to greater scrutiny due to alleged safety issues.

In 2021, Union City was among the municipalities in Hudson County that formally codified regulations governing the use of electric bicycles and e-scooters.

Newark Liberty International Airport is located 12.5 miles (20.1 km) south in Newark/Elizabeth. LaGuardia Airport in Queens, New York, is 12.3 miles (19.8 km) away. John F. Kennedy Airport is also in Queens. The Colombian airline Avianca operates a private bus service from to Union City and Elizabeth for passengers on Avianca flights departing from and arriving to JFK.

== Education ==
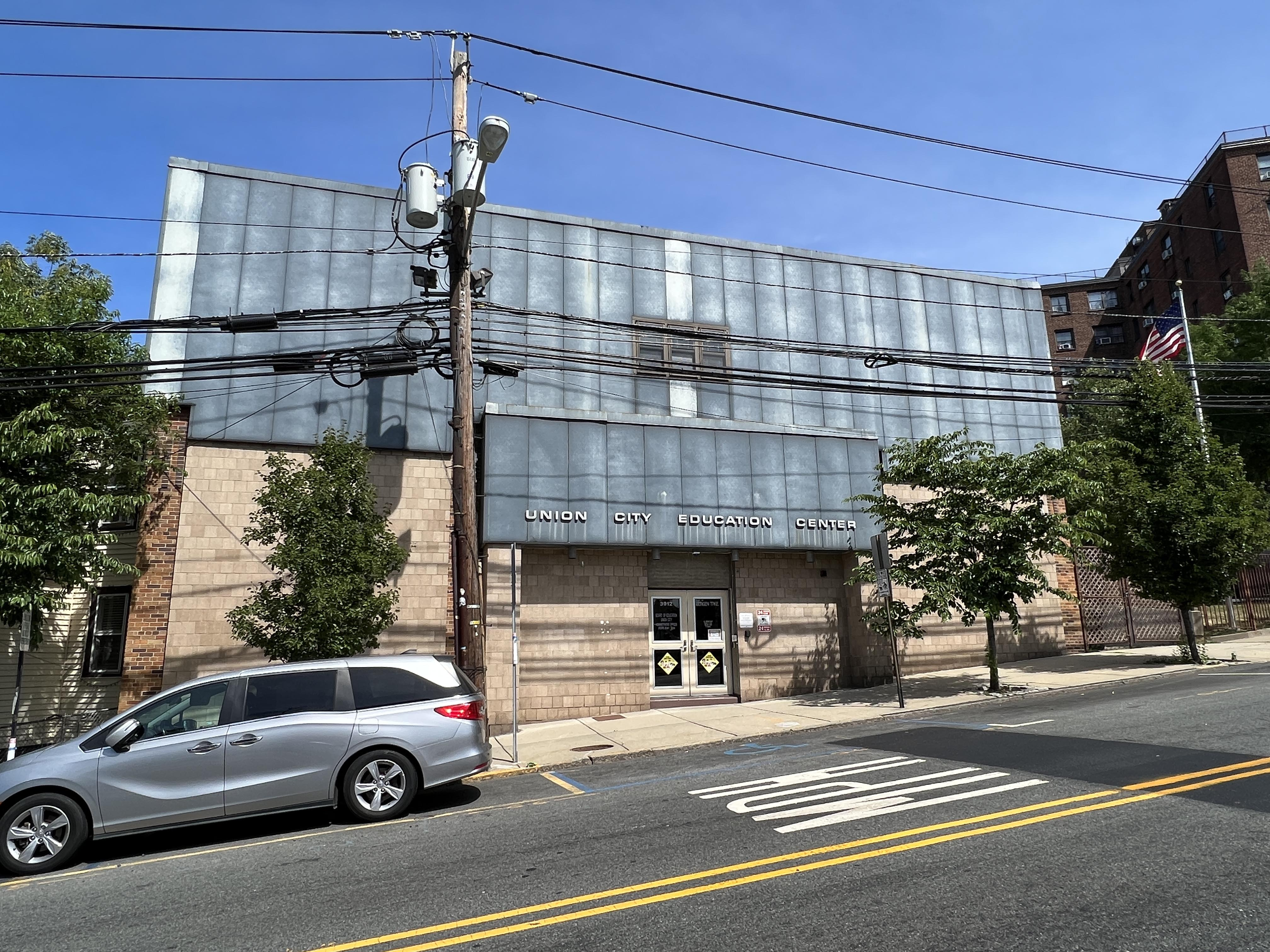
The city's Board of Education building

The student population was 9,730 as of November 2009. In 2021, its 14 public schools served 11,893 students.

Historically, Union City schools have ranked among the highest in Hudson County in reported incidents of violence compared to the size of the student population more than once, most recently in a November 2009 report by the New Jersey Department of Education, which annually records incidents of violence, vandalism, weapons and substance abuse or possession. According to the report, such incidents declined statewide between the 2006–2007 and the 2007–2008 school years, but rose slightly in Hudson County, with Union City schools having the second-highest number of reported incidents behind the Jersey City Public Schools.

University of California, Berkeley Professor David L. Kirp, in his 2011 book, Kids First, and his 2013 book, Improbable Scholars, praised Union City's education system for bringing poor, mostly immigrant kids (three quarters of whom live in homes where only Spanish is spoken and a quarter of which are thought to be undocumented and fearful of deportation) into the educational mainstream. Kirp, who spent a year in Union City examining its schools, notes that while in the late 1970s, Union City schools faced the threat of state takeover, they now boast achievement scores that approximate the statewide average. Kirp also observes that in 2011, Union City boasted a high school graduation rate of 89.5 percent—roughly 10 percentage points higher than the national average, and that in 2012, 75 percent of Union City graduates enrolled in college, with top students winning scholarships to the Ivy League. Kirp singles out the city's practice of enrolling almost every 3- and 4-year-old in kindergarten, and the leadership of Union City High School principal John Bennetti for the positive educational atmosphere in that school.

=== Public schools ===
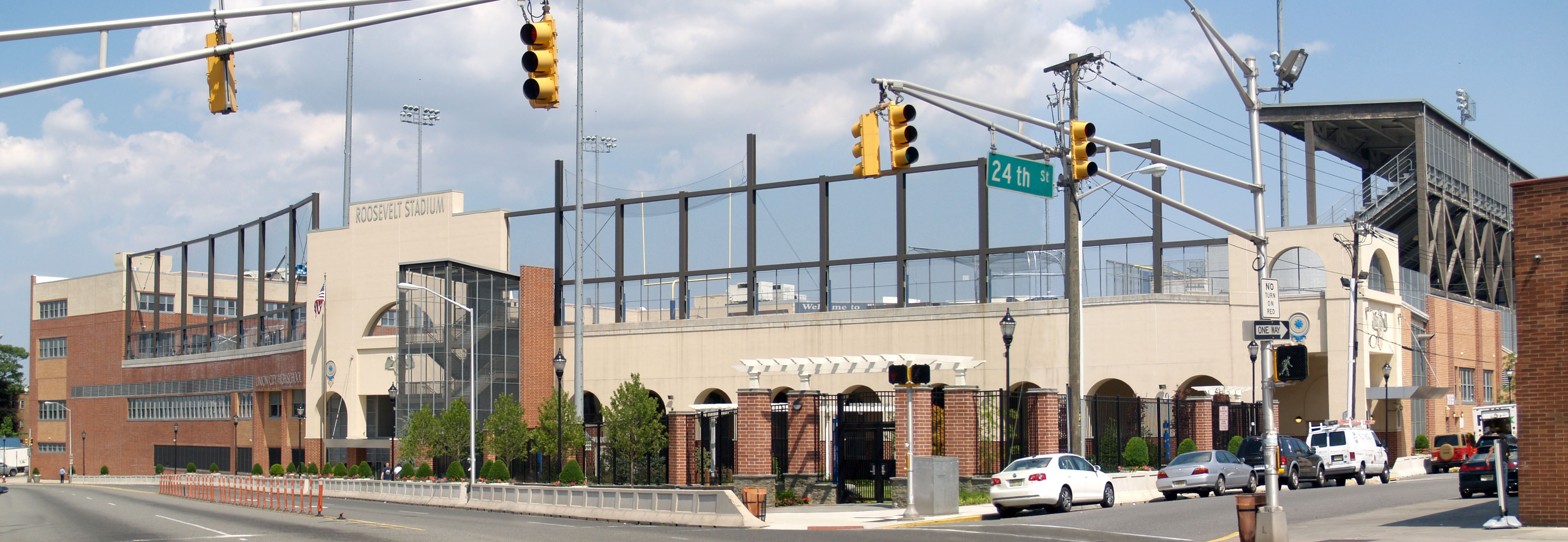
Union City High School

The Union City School District operates public schools in Union City, serving students in pre-kindergarten through twelfth grade. The district is one of 31 former Abbott districts statewide that were established pursuant to the decision by the New Jersey Supreme Court in Abbott v. Burke, which are now referred to as "SDA Districts" based on the requirement for the state to cover all costs for school building and renovation projects in these districts under the supervision of the New Jersey Schools Development Authority.

As of the 2022–23 school year, the district, comprised of 14 schools, had an enrollment of 12,848 students and 858.0 classroom teachers (on an FTE basis), for a student–teacher ratio of 15.0:1. Schools in the district (with 2022–23 enrollment data from the National Center for Education Statistics) are Eugenio Maria de Hostos Center for Early Childhood Education (279; grades PreK-K), Thomas A. Edison Elementary School (839; PreK–6), Sara Gilmore Academy School (390; 1–8), Henry Hudson Elementary School (295; PreK–3), Jefferson Elementary School (302; PreK–4), Colin Powell Elementary School (721; K–5), Theodore Roosevelt School (919; K–6), Veteran's Memorial Elementary School (551; PreK–5), George Washington Elementary School (779; PreK–6), Robert Waters Elementary School (976; PreK–6), Emerson Middle School (1,001; 6–8), Union Hill Middle School (849; 7–8), José Martí STEM Academy (664; 9–12) Union City High School (3,025; 9–12). and Esther Salas Academy.

The city's single public high school, Union City High School, opened September 3, 2009, and was built on the site of the former Roosevelt Stadium. The $178 million school, whose signature feature is an athletic field on its second floor roof, replaced the former Emerson High School and Union Hill High School, which converted to middle schools.

Hudson County Community College's $28.1 million North Hudson Higher Education Center opened in September 2011. The seven-story, 92,250-square-foot (8,570 m^{2}) Center is located on Kennedy Boulevard, adjacent to the Bergenline Avenue Light Rail station. It incorporates green technology, such as photovoltaic electrical systems, rainwater harvesting tanks, daylight and occupancy sensors, low-flow fixtures, and high-efficiency mechanical equipment. The NHHEC also houses offices for the Hudson County Career Development Center and the County Clerk.

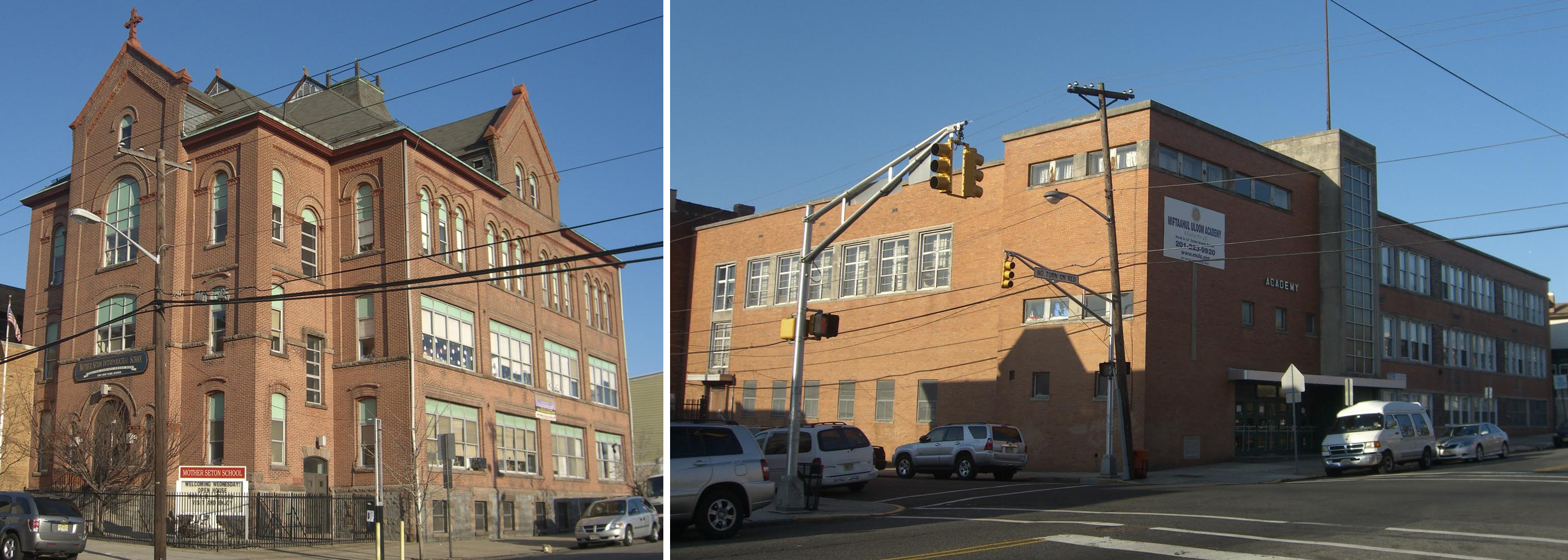
Mother Seton Interparochial School (left) and Miftaahul Uloom Academy, a Pre-K to 12th grade Islamic school (right), are both located on 15th Street.

Colin Powell Elementary School opened in September 2012 and was dedicated on February 7, 2013. It is the seventh educational facility created over the course of a decade, and the 14th school in the city. For the 2013–2014 school year students from Gilmore and Hudson Schools were relocated to Colin Powell, so that the former schools, both of which are over 100 years old, could undergo renovations. The K-5 school, which is located on New York Avenue and 15th Street, was visited by its namesake, former Secretary of State Colin Powell, in June 2013.

Woodrow Wilson School was awarded the Blue Ribbon School Award of Excellence by the United States Department of Education, the highest award an American school can receive, during the 2004–2005 school year. The Blue Ribbon School Award of Excellence was awarded again to Woodrow Wilson for the 2014–2015 school year.

Sarah M. Gilmore Elementary School, which is located on Kerrigan Avenue, between 16th and 17th Streets, opened in September 2017. The school, which cost $29 million, opened with 350 students.

The city's newest school is Esther Salas Academy, which was initially named Union City Middle School, and began construction in September 2023. The 15th school in the city, the six-story, $93.7 million project, which is located at 518 36th Street between Kennedy Boulevard and Bergenline Avenue, was conceived to ease overcrowding in the city's classrooms. It houses students that otherwise would have attended Emerson and Union Hill Middle Schools, as well as some ninth graders that would have otherwise attended Union City High School, and enable the city to move all sixth graders into its elementary schools. Although it is able to host 936 students, the city will limit it to 827. Its specialized classrooms include a robotics lab, a hydroponics lab, and a dance studio. Esther Salas herself cut the ribbon on the school in a ceremony held on September 15, 2025.

=== Private schools ===
St. Francis Academy is a K-8 Catholic school operated under the auspices of the Roman Catholic Archdiocese of Newark. In September 2013, St. Francis Academy was one of 15 schools in New Jersey to be recognized by the United States Department of Education as part of the National Blue Ribbon Schools Program, an award called the "most prestigious honor in the United States' education system" and which Education Secretary Arne Duncan described as honoring schools that "represent examples of educational excellence". In the wake of declining enrollment and lingering financial issues, Mother Seton Interparochial School (which had been formed in 2006 from the merger of St. Michael's and St. Anthony of Padua) and St. Augustine's School were closed by the Newark Archdiocese after the 2019–20, school year and merged into Academy of St. Joseph of the Palisades in West New York, New Jersey.

Other schools in Union City include two Islamic schools, Miftaahul Uloom Academy and Rising Star Academy, a Jewish school, Mesivta Sanz, and Union City Daycare Program School.

== Notable landmarks ==
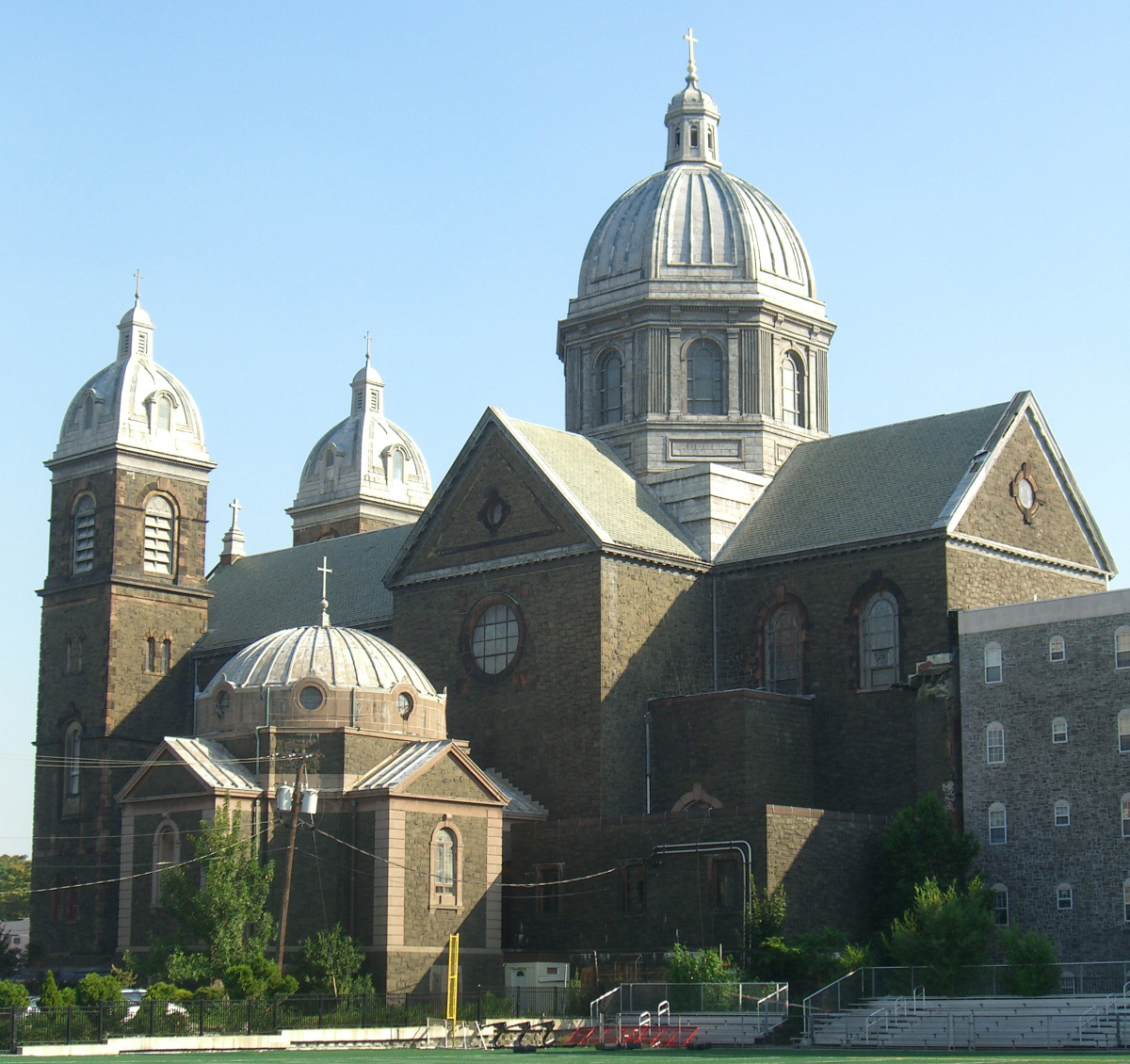
Hudson Presbyterian Church

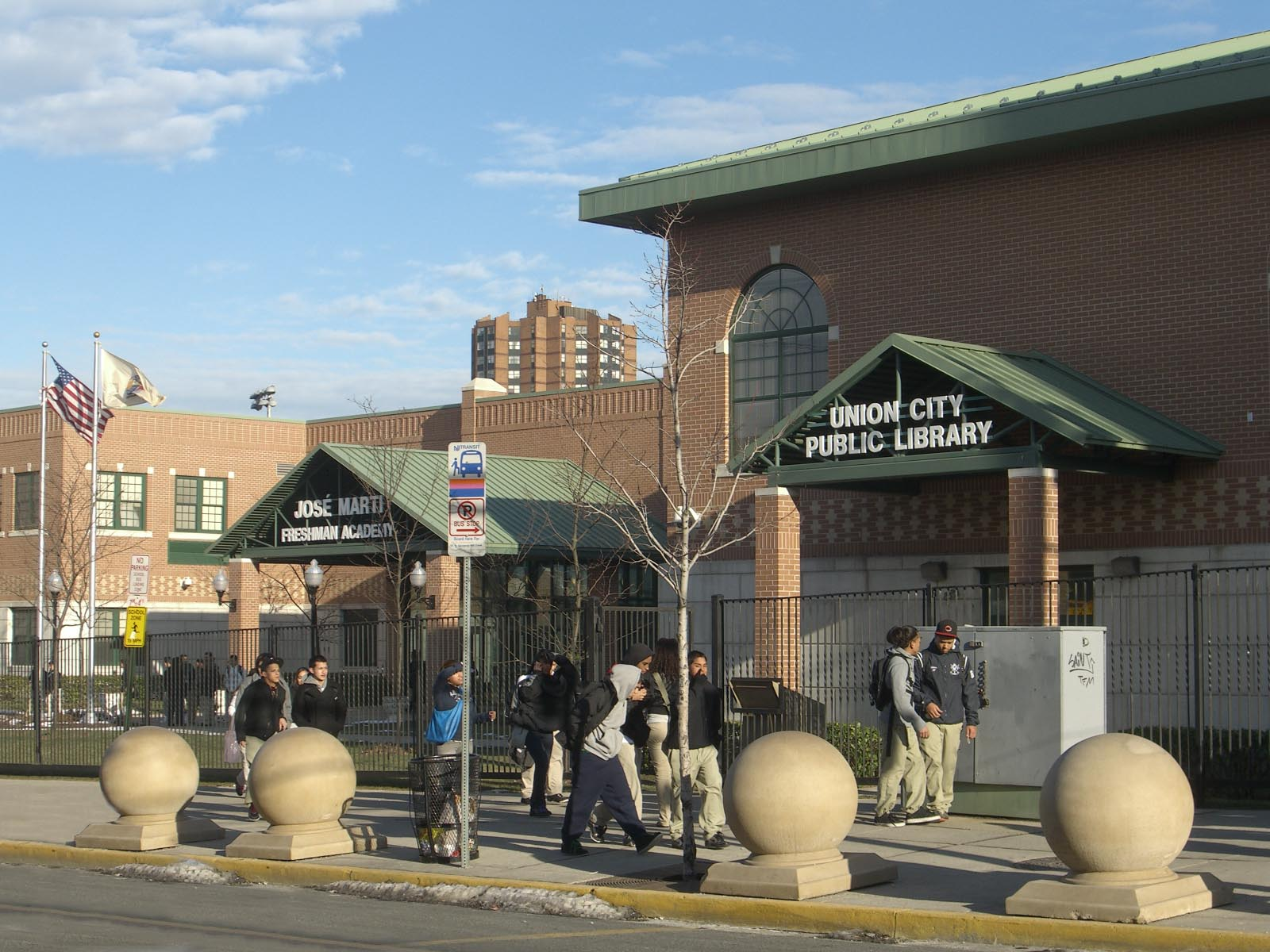
José Martí STEM Academy and Union City Public Library

The former Monastery and Church of Saint Michael the Archangel on West Street, once the largest Roman Catholic church in Hudson County, is the one landmark on the National Register of Historic Places in Union City, and one of several locations which have been designated by New Jersey Register of Historic Places. It is now known as the Hudson Presbyterian Church. In 2002 José Martí Middle School and the southern branch of the Union City Public Library were built on the southern side of the Monastery grounds, on 18th Street. They opened in 2004. When Union City High School opened in September 2009, the middle school converted to José Martí Freshman Academy to house most of town's ninth graders. In 2019 that building was repurposed as José Martí STEM Academy, in order to expand access to instruction in Science, technology, engineering, and mathematics.

The Park Performing Arts Center was originally built in 1931 by the German congregation the Catholic parish of Holy Family Church (and still owned by the Roman Catholic Archdiocese of Newark) to house their cultural and educational programs Its outstanding feature is the Park Theater which seats 1,400. Incorporated in 1983 the non-profit arts center presents works of local, national, and international artists, as well as permanent and rotating exhibitions.

Union City High School and Athletic Complex opened in September 2009 on the site of the former Roosevelt Stadium, demolished in 2005 to make way for it. The sports field is located on the second floor roof of the building, which also houses the Union City Performing Arts Center and a community health center.

Emerson Middle School, was opened in April 1915 as West Hoboken High School, and was home to the Bulldogs. It was renamed Emerson High School for the writer Ralph Waldo Emerson, when the two towns merged. Located on New York Avenue at 18th Street, the original building is connected with the gym building, built in the 1980s, by a second story enclosed bridge that runs over New York Avenue. The school became the South campus of Union City High School in September 2008, before converting to a middle school in September 2009, with the opening of the new Union City High School proper. The mascot of Union City was also changed to the Soaring Eagles. Alumni of the school include DJ and music producer Erick Morillo and former Green Bay Packers center Frank Winters.

Union City is home to two Carnegie Libraries funded by the donations of steel magnate Andrew Carnegie. Both are considered historically and architecturally significant by the city. The first was built in 1903 by the Cranwell family builders, who were active in the construction of many of the city's buildings, with a $25,000 donation by Carnegie in what was once West Hoboken on 15th Street between Bergenline Avenue and New York Avenue. The second was built in 1905 at the corner of 43rd Street and New York Avenue in what was once Union Hill, and is the main branch. The 15th Street library retains its original stained glass, but was closed in 2004 upon the completion of a new library on the corner of Summit Avenue and 18th Street, housed in the same building as José Martí Middle School. It was converted into the William V. Musto Cultural Center, which opened in June 2011. It houses the Union City Museum of Art, the Union City Police Museum, the Union City Art Gallery & Concert Hall, the Union City Museum of History, and a senior citizen center.

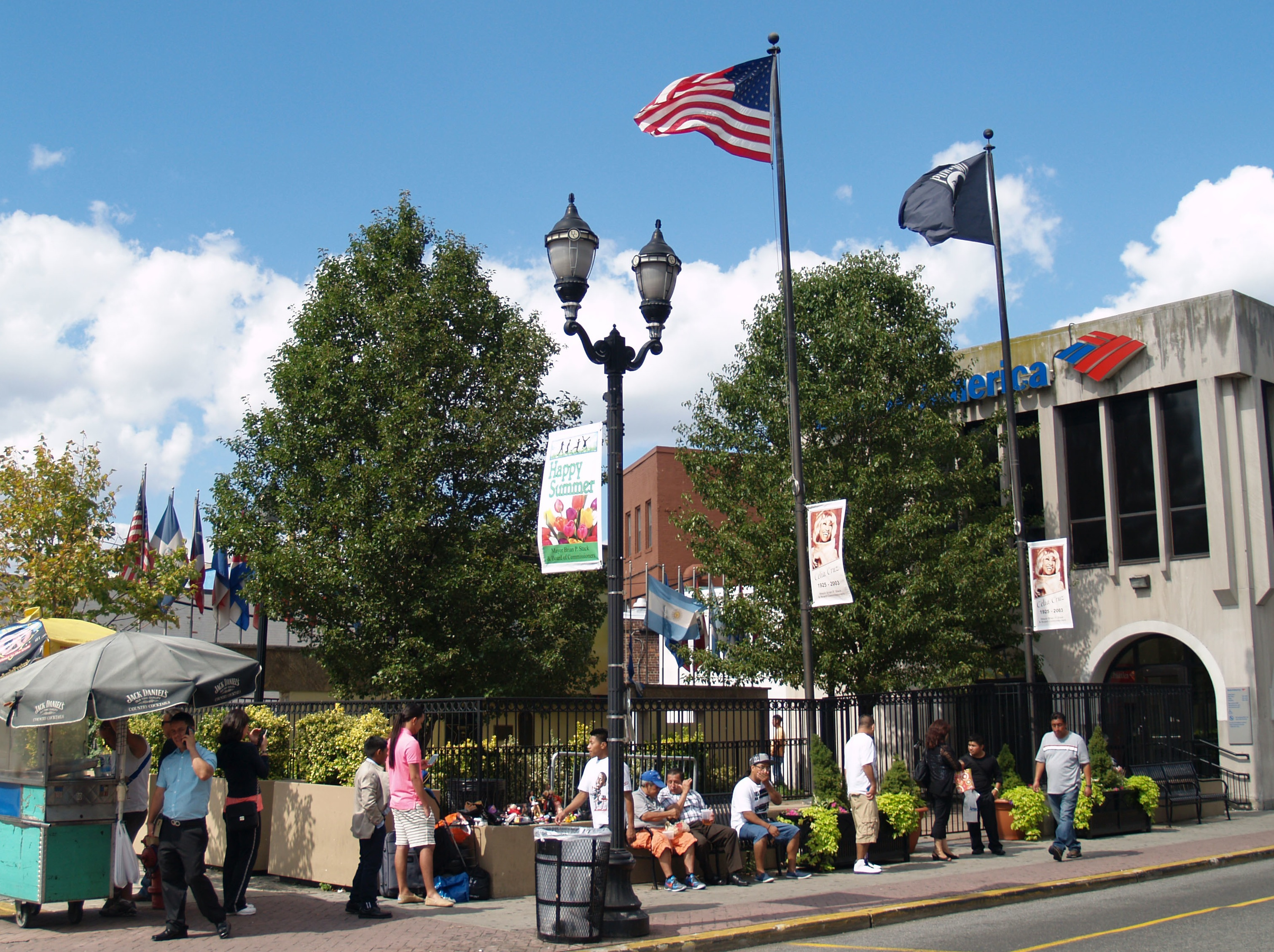
Celia Cruz Park was constructed in tribute to Cuban-American salsa singer Celia Cruz and other Latin stars.

Celia Cruz Park On June 4, 2004, nearly a year after the death of Cuban-American salsa singer Celia Cruz (who lived in nearby Fort Lee), Union City heralded its annual Cuban Day Parade by dedicating a park to Cruz, which is also known as Celia Cruz Plaza, at 31st Street and Bergenline Avenue, with Cruz's widower, Pedro Knight, present. The park featured a sidewalk star in Cruz's honor, and an 8' × 10' mural by Union City's Edgardo Davila, a collage of Cruz's career throughout the decades. There are four other similar dedications to Cruz around the world. The Latin American Kiwanis Club refurbished the park in early June 2006, replacing the mural with a backlit photograph of Cruz. Cruz's star has expanded into Union City's "Walk of Fame", as new marble stars are added each spring to honor Latin entertainment and media personalities. People so honored at the park include merengue singer Joseíto Mateo, salsa singer La India, Cuban musician Israel "Cachao" Lopez, Cuban tenor Beny Moré, Tito Puente, Spanish language television news anchor Rafael Pineda, salsa pioneer Johnny Pacheco, singer/bandleader Gilberto Santa Rosa and music promoter Ralph Mercado.

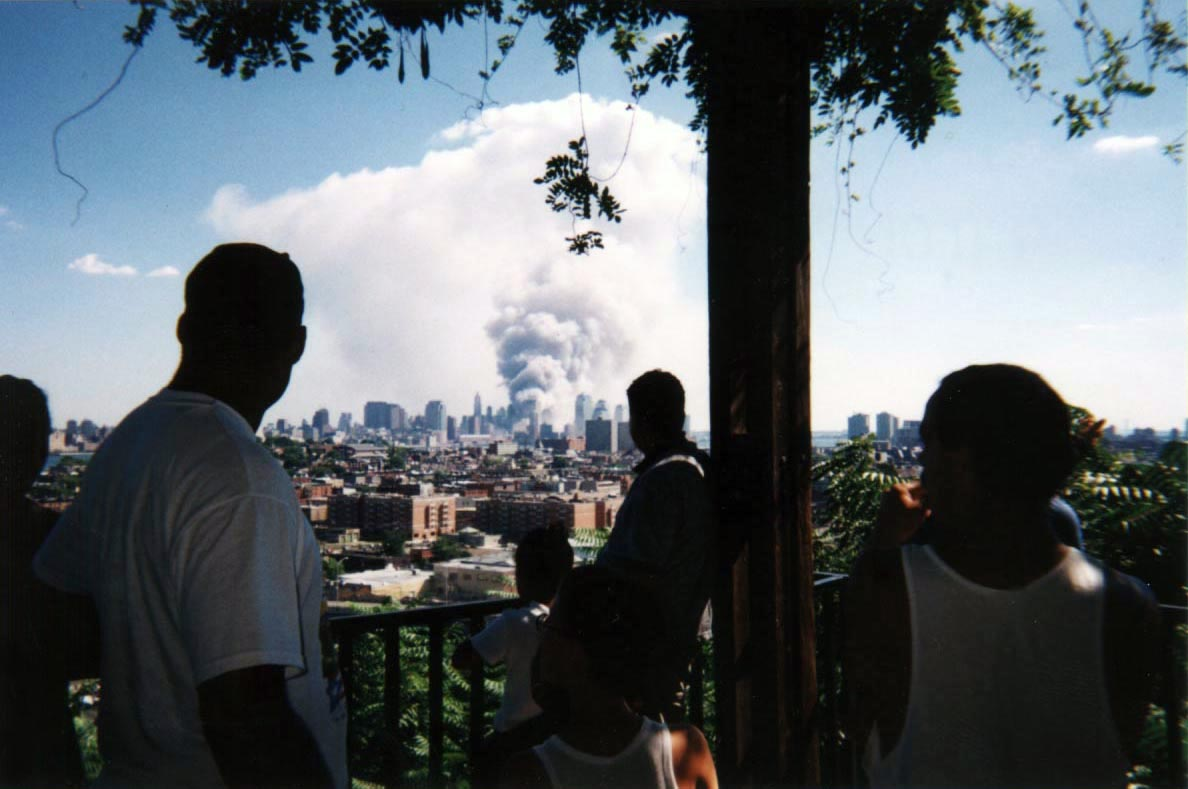
Spectators viewing the aftermath of the September 11, 2001, terrorist attacks from Doric Park. The park was later turned into Firefighter's Memorial Park.

9/11 Memorials The city's first memorial to honor the five Union City citizens who died in the September 11, 2001, terrorist attacks was a sculpture placed in Doric Park, in whose courtyard citizens gathered on September 11, 2001, to view the attacks' aftermath. On September 11, 2007, the city dedicated its Liberty Plaza to commemorate the event. The Plaza, which serves as a transit hub through which commuters pass on their way to and from Manhattan, includes two memorial markers. Doric Park was later rebuilt as Firefighters Memorial Park, which opened in August 2009. The park includes a public swimming pool, and a new memorial to local fallen firefighters that stands at the entrance. Its popularity has attracted visitors from Manhattan and Staten Island.

The Monastery of the Perpetual Rosary, known as The Blue Chapel, was constructed between 1912 and 1914. In 2010, the chapel was included on Preservation New Jersey's annual 10 Most Endangered Historic Sites list, which is intended to draw attention to historical sites in need of preservation. The site's caretakers have previously indicated that it will likely be abandoned or sold, but the city Board of Commissioners passed a November 3, 2010 resolution designating it as a historic site as part of efforts to protect it.

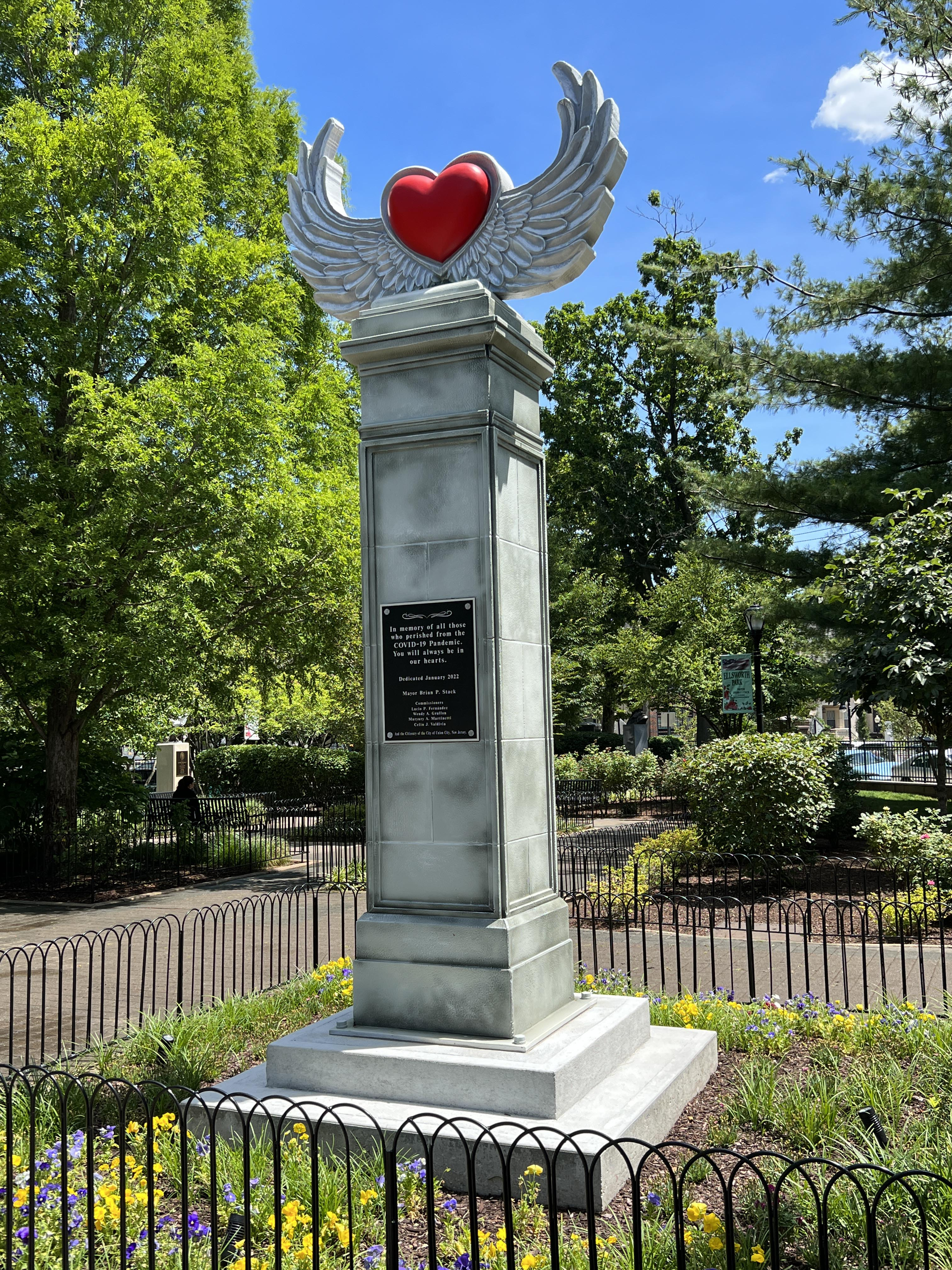
The city's COVID-19 pandemic memorial

Historical markers In 2009, Union City began installing a series of historical markers to commemorate the lives of its noteworthy natives. The first marker was dedicated to the memory of boxer Joe Jeanette on April 17, 2009, and placed at the corner of Summit Avenue and 27th Street on April 17, 2009, where Jeanette's former residence and gym once stood. The marker lies two blocks from a street, located between Summit Avenue and Kennedy Boulevard, that was named Jeanette Street in his honor. Present at the dedication ceremony was Jeanette's grandniece, Sabrina Jennette. Another historical marker was dedicated September 26, 2009 to Peter George Urban, a 10th degree karate grandmaster, writer and teacher who founded an American karate system, American Goju Do. Present at the dedication ceremony was Urban's daughter, Julia Urban-Kimmerly. On May 22, 2010, the city dedicated a marker to novelist and screenwriter Pietro di Donato, and placed at Bergenline Avenue and 31st Street, where di Donato once lived. That area was named Pietro di Donato Plaza in his honor. Present at the dedication ceremony was di Donato's son, Richard. The fourth marker was dedicated to painter William Tylee Ranney on September 18, 2010. In addition to those honoring people, subsequent markers were erected to honor particular sites. As of December 2012, the city had eight historic markers.

COVID-19 Victims Memorial On March 25, 2022, the city dedicated a memorial in Ellsworth Park, in tribute to the citizens who died and suffered as a result of the COVID-19 pandemic. A plaque on the forward side of the pedestal reads, "In memory of all those who perished from the COVID-19 Pandemic. You will always be in our hearts."

== Media and culture ==
Union City is located within the New York media market, but all of its traditional newspapers serving northern New Jersey have folded. Until its closing in 1991, the Hudson Dispatch, a morning daily newspaper that once had a circulation of 39,132, was based in Union City for 117 years. The Union City Reporter was part of the Hudson Reporter group of local weeklies until that chain closed in January 2023. Local, county, and regional news was covered by the daily Jersey Journal before it also closed in February 1, 2025. Other publications that cover local news include the River View Observer, The Weehawken Gazette, and the Spanish-language El Especialito, which is as of 2016, is headquartered in Union City.

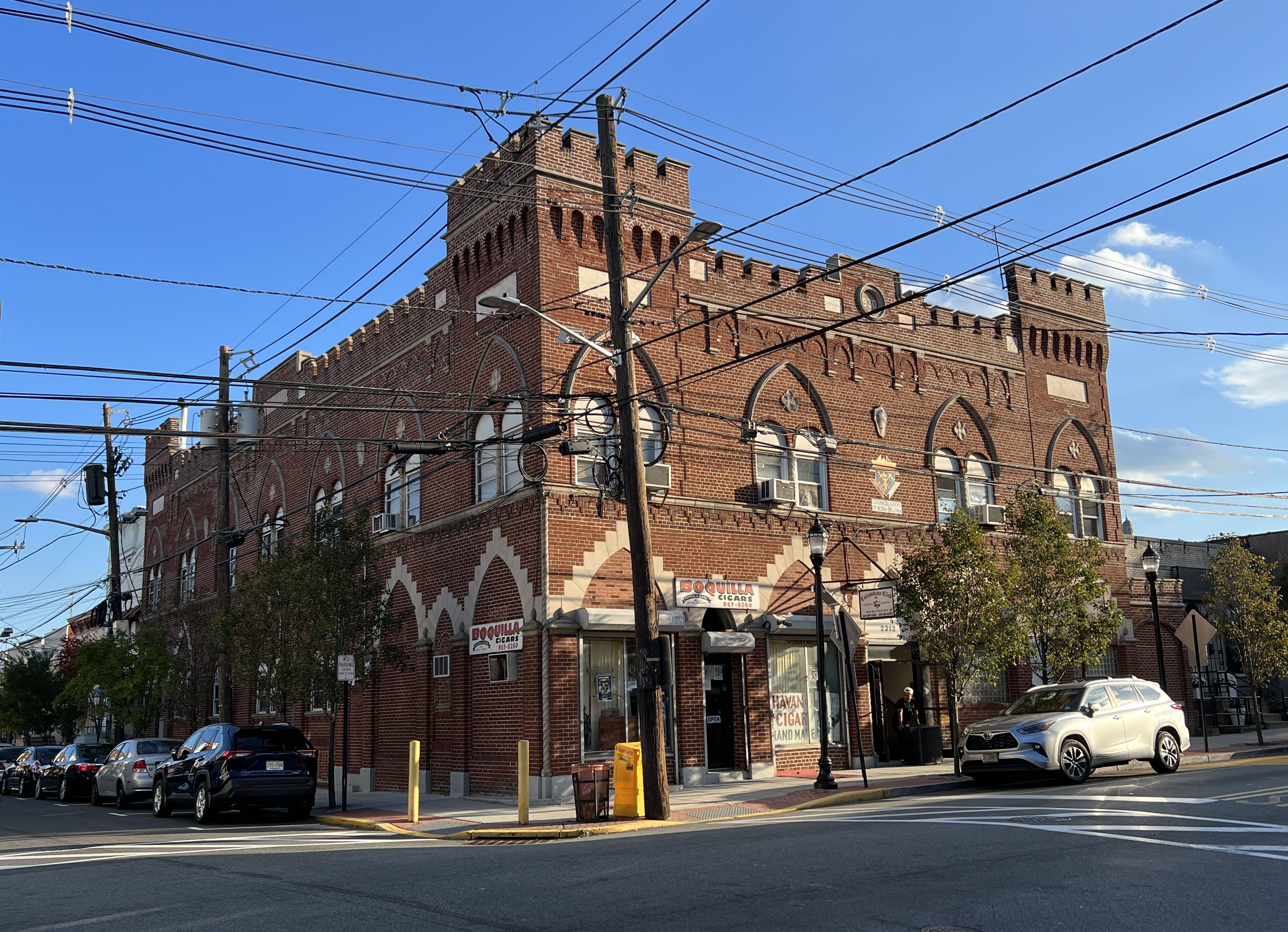
The building at 2312 Summit Avenue has served as a venue for performers including Frank Sinatra, Tito Nieves, and Bacilos, and was a key filming location for the 1989 film Bloodhounds of Broadway, starring Madonna, who lived in an apartment in the building during filming.

Among the films set or shot in the city are Union City (1980) (which was released in conjunction with the Blondie song "Union City Blue"), Out of the Darkness (1985), and Far from Heaven (2002). The low-budget film directed by former Guttenberg mayor Peter Lavilla, Oak Hill, features local institutions including Union City's Palisades Emergency Residence Corporation homeless shelter and a synagogue in North Bergen.

The mixed-use, two-story building at 2312 Summit Avenue, at the corner of 24th street, which features two ballrooms, has hosted performers including Frank Sinatra, Tito Nieves, La Sonora, Bacilos, Guayacan, and Nelson N. The 1989 film Bloodhounds of Broadway, which starred Madonna, Matt Dillon, and Jennifer Grey, was also partially filmed at the building. Specifically, one of the two ballrooms in the building was used as a major setting for much of the film, which is set on New Year's Eve in 1928. During shooting at that location, the property was rented for six months, and Madonna lived in an apartment in the building. It was put up for sale in October 2023 for $2.5 million. Not far away, Madonna also recorded her self-titled debut album at the former Quantum Sound Studios near Washington Park at 512 Paterson Plank Road, across the street from the Union City side of that road.

In the late 2000s, Union City, West New York, Weehawken and North Bergen came to be dubbed collectively as "NoHu", a North Hudson haven for local performing and fine artists, many of whom are immigrants from Latin America and other countries, in part due to lower housing costs compared to those in nearby art havens such as Hoboken, Jersey City and Manhattan. The Union City area is a major training ground for actors in the county. In September 2008, Union City held its first annual month-long Art Month, which originated with the September 2006 "Celebrate Art" show at St. John's Episcopal Church. Art Month includes events such as the Union City Arts and Crafts Festival, held the second week of every September. Group shows are also arranged by organizations such as La Ola, a group formed to help unite local artists, and Federación Mercantil, which provides support to artists in the form of bank loan assistance and help avoiding foreclosure, and puts on an annual show of work by Spanish-American painters. Another is the Union City Artists Collective, founded in 2007 by a group of artists and public officials that includes painter/sculptor Amado Mora, who was named Union City's first Art Curator, responsible for the Union City Art Gallery at City Hall. Locations in which artists reside or have put on tours or shows include the Yardley Building, a former Yardley of London soap factory on Palisade Avenue that overlooks Hoboken, and the old R.H. Simon Silk Mill on 39th Street, which has been dubbed the "Union Hill Arts Building". The Park Performing Arts Center is also a popular arts venue in the city, as it houses Hudson Theatre Works, a theatre company founded in 2011. It was also the first venue for the Park Players, an acting troupe founded in the early 1980s by local teacher Joseph Conklin, and formerly hosted the NoHu Visions show, and the annual two-day Multi-Arts Festival until 2010, when the latter moved to Union City High School, which houses the Union City Performing Arts Center.

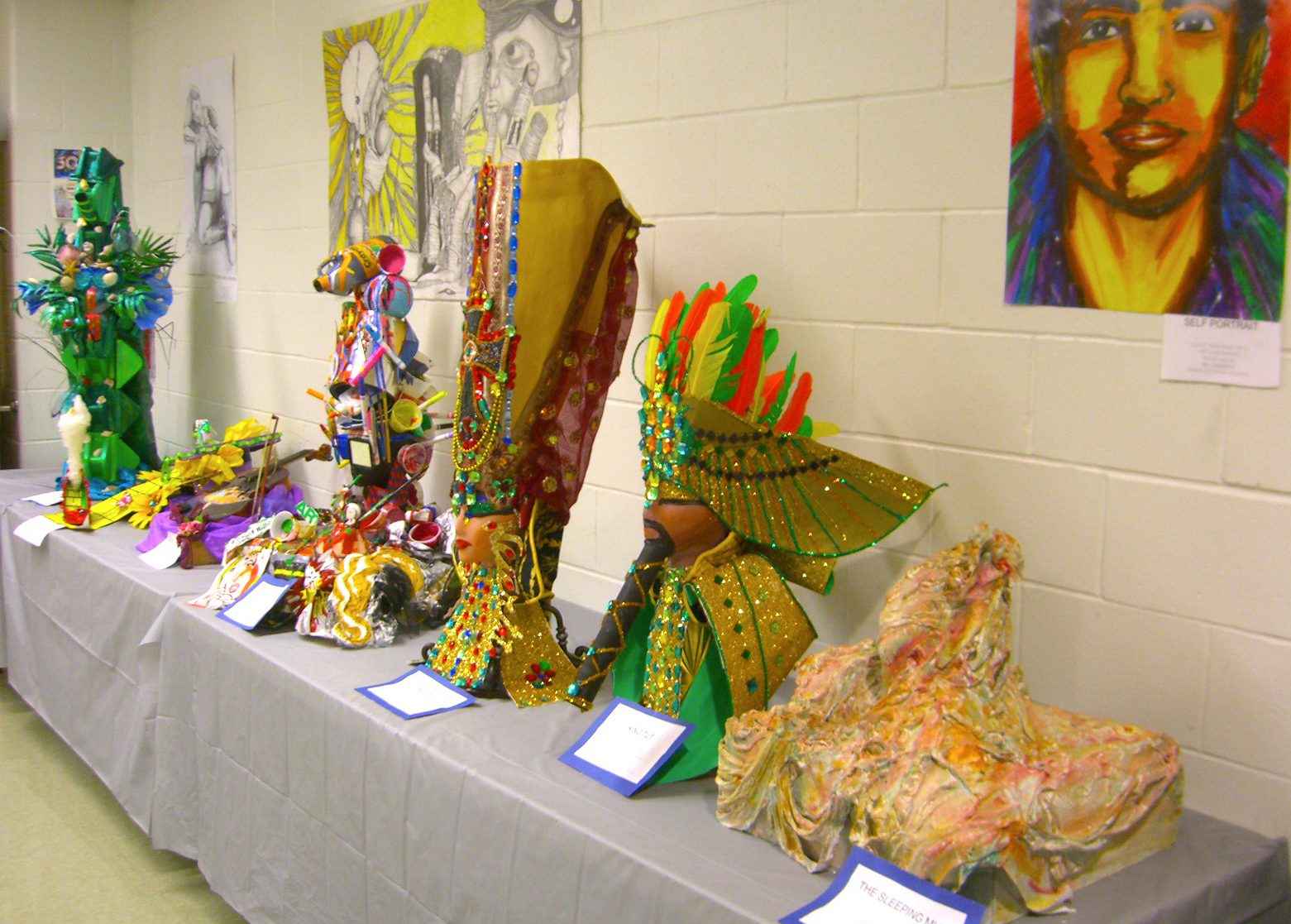
Artwork at the Union City Multi-Arts Festival

In 2009 poet/musician Graciela Barreto was named Union City's first poet laureate. By April 2010 she was succeeded by Ben Figueroa. During the late 2000s the city also named a City Historian and organized a Historical Committee.

The 2010 independent gothic horror art film, Vampire in Union City, was filmed entirely in Union City, and was directed by entertainer and Union City Commissioner Lucio Fernandez. Produced by MeLu Films, it premiered on September 3, 2010, at the Summit Theater, marking the city's first movie premiere, and the 2010 Celebrate Art Month, which included art exhibits, jazz, dance and opera performances, a film festival, and the public release of Francisco Rivadeneira's book, Los Amos del Planeta, Tomo II.

On April 20, 2018, Union City's Performing Arts Center hosted the official premiere of Union City, U.S.A., a documentary on the city's history and culture. It was written, directed, and produced by Fernandez, who began research for the film in 2008 with city historian Gerard Karabin, conducting interviews with numerous past and current residents of the city. The film was edited by director of photography Mauro De Trizio, and narrated by Tom Colavito.

The Multi-Arts Festival is an exhibition of artwork, musical performances and workshops held every May since 1981. Students and alumni of the various schools of Union City display their artwork, put on musical performances, and put on free demonstrations of sculpture, portraiture and caricature for attendees. It was created by Agnes Dauerman, a Union Hill High School art teacher, who coordinated the program for 25 years before she retired in 2005. The Union City Museum of Art, the Union City Police Museum, the Union City Art Gallery and Concert Hall and the Union City Museum of History are housed in the William V. Musto Cultural Center, formerly the 15th Street library. The Musto Center hosts a number of events, including various concerts and theatrical performances. Specific events it has hosted include the Union City Artist Awards, the NoHu International Film Festival, and Artists Assemble!, a comics convention first held in February 2013.

The first annual Union City International Film Festival began in December 2010, with the short film X, which was written and directed by Josh Brolin, as the opening film. Later that month Union City unveiled the Union City Plaza of the Arts on Bergenline Avenue between 30th and 31st Streets, as a venue for artists to congregate and showcase their work. The location, which sees copious traffic to and from Midtown Manhattan, was chosen in order to showcase the city in a positive light to commuters, and so that the plaza could represent fine arts alongside the adjacent Pietro Di Donato Plaza and Celia Cruz Plaza, which represent literature and music, respectively.

On June 11, 2014, the city's Board of Commissioners passed a resolution adopting "Union City" as the city's official song. The song was composed by Union City native Phil Gallo and Weehawken native Mike Boldt, and performed by the group Dez Manku, which features Boldt and Gallo. An accompanying music video was produced and edited by Mauro DeTrizio for Action Productions, and released on YouTube and iTunes. The guitar-driven rock song's lyrics make references to local streets such as Bergenline Avenue and Monastery Place, and landmarks such as the Roosevelt Theater, the Hudson Burlesque, and the former high schools, Emerson and Union Hill.

== Notes ==
a: Nearby Guttenberg, New Jersey is more densely populated, but is incorporated as a town (not as a city).
