= George Otlowski =

American politician (1912–2009)

Member of the New Jersey General Assembly from the 19th district
- In office January 8, 1974 – January 14, 1992 Serving with Alan Karcher and Jim McGreevey
- Preceded by: District created
- Succeeded by: Stephen A. Mikulak; Ernest L. Oros

Mayor of Perth Amboy, New Jersey
- In office 1976–1990
- Preceded by: Alexander Jankowski
- Succeeded by: Joseph Vas

Personal details
- Born: January 3, 1912 Perth Amboy, New Jersey
- Died: March 16, 2009 (aged 97) Perth Amboy, New Jersey
- Party: Democratic

George John Otlowski (January 3, 1912 – March 16, 2009) was an American publisher turned Democratic Party politician who served on the Board of Chosen Freeholders for Middlesex County, New Jersey for eight years. He served in the New Jersey General Assembly for 18 years, and was Mayor of Perth Amboy, New Jersey for 14 years.

== Biography ==
He was born on January 3, 1912. His first job was at an asphalt company working as a water boy, having lied about his age and claiming he was 16. Otlowski's initial career was as in publishing, as president of a company that printed Polish language newspapers for the large Polish community in the area. He became active in the city's Democratic political machine, which was led by former New Jersey Attorney General David T. Wilentz. In 1944, he took a position as assistant to Perth Amboy's mayor, John Delaney.

Otlowski first sought elective office in 1955, winning the first of two terms on the Middlesex County Board of Chosen Freeholders. In the 1962 primary for the newly formed New Jersey's 15th congressional district, Otlowski lost to Edward J. Patten, a former mayor of Perth Amboy. He won his first General Assembly race in 1973, representing the 19th Legislative District and served there until 1992. In the Assembly, he supported legislation to aid the mentally ill and those living in nursing homes, and helped create Middlesex County College. In the 1991 primary elections, Otlowski lost a three-way race for the two Assembly seats in the district.

Perth Amboy elected him as its mayor in 1976, serving what The Star-Ledger described as a "stormy tenure". In the years following his election, the city saw a major demographic change with a substantial increase in the Hispanic population and gradually The Star-Ledger described how the people "were turning against him". Two Hispanic candidates ran against Otlowski in the 1988 mayoral race, with Joseph Vas coming in second by 325 votes. In 1989, the candidates Otlowski had supported for city council lost in the local elections and he was unable to work with the slate that won election. By 1990, he was facing a recall election petition led by Vas and he decided to step down two years into his term of office, saying "I had a lot of fun being mayor. There were tremendous challenges. It was like fighting some kind of dragon."

Otlowski lived on Kennedy Street in Perth Amboy, just blocks from where he was born. He died at age 97 on March 16, 2009, at Raritan Bay Medical Center in Perth Amboy. He wrote an obituary for himself in his later years that said "He loved the city as strongly and deeply as he loved his family".
