= Wilda Diaz =

American politician (born 1964)

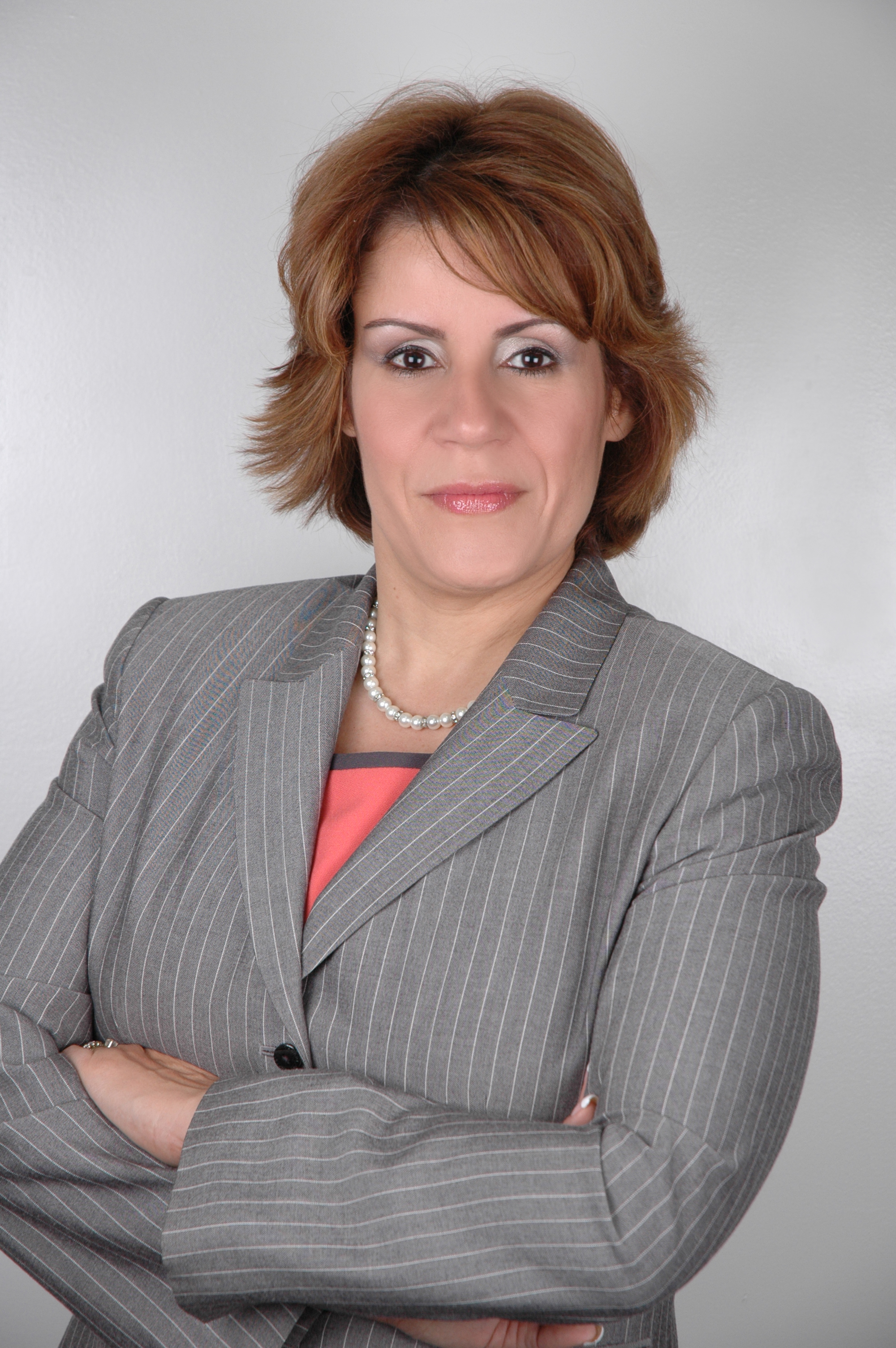

Mayor of Perth Amboy
- In office July 1, 2008 – December 31, 2020
- Preceded by: Joseph Vas
- Succeeded by: Helmin Caba

Personal details
- Born: September 14, 1964 (age 61) Perth Amboy, New Jersey, U.S.
- Party: Democratic
- Spouse: Greg Diaz
- Education: Perth Amboy High School
- Profession: Banker

Wilda Diaz (born Wilda Soto; September 14, 1964) is an American former politician and Mayor of Perth Amboy, New Jersey. She was elected in May 2008, defeating incumbent Joseph Vas by a 58% to 42% margin. She was Perth Amboy's first female mayor and New Jersey's first Latina mayor. She served for 12 years from 2008 until 2020.

On November 6, 2012, Diaz was re-elected with 37 percent of the ballots cast in Perth Amboy, receiving 4,404 votes, surpassing top challenger Billy Delgado and second-tier candidates Frank Salado, Miguel Morales, Robert McCoy, and Sharon Hubberman, who had a combined 7,147-vote total. Delgado received 3,339 votes, Salado collected 1,678, Morales scored 1,277, McCoy got 618, and Hubberman earned 235. In 2020, she was defeated by Helmin Caba in the December 15th Mayoral Runoff election after serving for 12 years as mayor.

== Personal life ==
Diaz is one of six daughters of Mercedes and Antonio Soto, laborers who moved to New Jersey from their native San Sebastian, Puerto Rico. A lifelong resident of Perth Amboy, Diaz graduated from Perth Amboy High School in 1983. After graduation, she began a twenty-year career in banking, starting as a teller in a local bank and working her way up to becoming an assistant vice president at Banco Popular in the Elizabeth branch office. She resigned from the bank after she was elected mayor in 2008.

She and her husband, Greg Diaz, have two children.

== Politics ==
On March 14, 2009, the local Republican Club honored Diaz at an event attended by Chris Christie, a former United States Attorney for the District of New Jersey who was actively seeking the Republican Party nomination for governor for the November 2009 general election against incumbent governor Jon Corzine. Diaz cooperated in an investigation being conducted by federal and state law enforcement agencies relating to activities connected to former Mayor Vas's administration. Despite her affiliation with the Democratic Party, Diaz hired several Republicans to serve in her administration. In May 2010, she supported three Republican candidates for city council, including former city committee chairman Kenneth Gonzalez, and appointed another former city GOP leader, Maria Garcia, to the municipal planning board.

On June 13, 2012, accompanied by State Senator Joseph Vitale, a three-time running mate of former assemblyman and mayor Joseph Vas, Diaz announced that she would seek a second term as mayor. Six challengers filed petitions to run against Diaz by the September 4 deadline, but 2004 mayoral candidate Billy Delgado appears to be her top rival.

While running for re-election, Diaz disclosed the contents of a private e-mail from her former campaign consultant in which the political operative indelicately challenged her "lack of gravitas and intelligence". That message was exploited by the campaign, in a press conference that morphed the confidential suggestion that she not seek a second term into an "unacceptable level of misogynistic rhetoric" and daily newspapers purveyed the distortion. Newark Star-Ledger columnist Mark Di Ionno remarked, "She called a press conference, trying to spin the private e-mails to her political advantage, while effectively calling attention to the fact that her former campaign consultant, a one-time trusted ally, thinks she's (stupid)".

Throughout her re-election effort, Diaz repeatedly claimed that she reduced the city's $250 million debt by $54 million but official records show that is not true. Annual debt statements filed by the city show that five months before Wilda Diaz was elected, the city owed a total of $181 million, and the latest filings reflect that Perth Amboy now owes close to $230 million.

As the 2014 elections approached, two slates for city council and two teams competing for school board e lined up with on one side Diaz allies who were close political associates of Joe Vas and on the other side, former allies who helped her win the job in 2008.

"The upcoming election in Perth Amboy could be a referendum on Mayor Wilda Diaz... Council President Joel Pabon Sr., a Customer Service supervisor for the US Postal Service who was on the school board, ran for council with former Mayor Joe Vas in 2008. Today he is being supported for re-election by Diaz. Dianne Roman served as city administrator under former Mayor Joe Vas but she is also being supported for re-election to the school board by Diaz, who kept her on the municipal payroll. Pabon is actually calling his slate ‘the Mayor Diaz Team,’ which includes Councilman William Petrick and newcomer Sergio Diaz. Roman is running under the ‘Restoring Educational Priorities’ banner with Thomas Thor and Republican Junior Iglesia."

== Record in office ==
After being elected on a platform to serve as a reformer, Diaz was sworn into office in a ceremony attended by U.S. Attorney Chris Christie. Diaz sought and won council approval of a 10% tax hike almost immediately after she took office. She agreed to support South Amboy Mayor John O'Leary to replace Vas in the Assembly, but he withdrew from the race after allegations of corruption were publicized and the state Attorney General initiated an investigation of his business affairs. Diaz then supported Perth Amboy resident Mathias "Eddie" Rodriguez, who retired as a state superior court judge, for the Assembly seat, but he was defeated by Craig Coughlin, who had the support of Woodbridge Mayor John McCormac.

In July 2009, Diaz eliminated the city's emergency medical services and transferred responsibility for ambulances to Raritan Bay Medical Center to reduce city expanses without reducing the levels of service.

Diaz was one of several mayors who testified before a legislative committee on June 20, 2011, in support of A-4133, legislation designed to reduce municipal expenses by increasing public employee contributions to the cost of health and pension benefits and temporarily eliminating health benefits as a subject of collective bargaining. The legislation was strongly opposed by public employee unions across the state.

In 2011, the Diaz administration and Chevron Corporation settled a $12 million tax appeal lawsuit the company had filed against the city seeking repayment of taxes paid from 2007 to 2010. The suit was based on an increase in the company's property assessment that occurred during the Vas administration. The settlement, negotiated prior to the beginning of a trial, provided for a refund of $7.9 million and a reduction of the property assessment for future years.

Diaz urged voters to defeat the school budget in 2009, and voters heeded the advice and rejected the budget by nearly two-to-one. In collaboration with the Perth Amboy Business Improvement District (BID), Diaz launched a June 2011 effort to stop littering.

Christie appointed Diaz to the state's Housing Opportunity Task Force on February 17, 2010. As a member of the task force, Diaz endorsed Republican efforts to abolish the state's affordable housing program, which was criticized by advocates for the poor. Diaz was one of only two Democrats who joined a roster of 56 Republican mayors from Middlesex, Monmouth, Burlington, Ocean, Hunterdon and Mercer Counties in support of Governor Christie's constitutional amendment proposal of capping real estate taxes at 2.5% (known locally as the "Cap 2.5 Amendment"). She also has received criticism for breaking her campaign promise to end the practice of granting residency waivers, which have allowed at least four high-paid municipal employees to work without having to establish residency in the city.

A 2010 attempt by a former city employee to recall the mayor on charges of gross mismanagement, failure to stabilize taxes and lack of redevelopment in the city failed to move forward after the deadline to collect 5,546 signatures required for a recall election was not met.

In August 2011, representatives from the Kushner Companies made a presentation to the Perth Amboy Redevelopment Agency proposing a scaled-back design concept for the Landings at Harborside, a residential development set to be built along the city's waterfront, and allowing rental housing instead of owner-occupied units as originally planned. Diaz endorsed the plan the following month, saying "This is an opportunity to have a redesign Perth Amboy is proud of, that reflects the city's historical significance."

In October 2010, the city council voted to hold city elections in November instead of May, beginning in 2012. A bill enacted by the state legislature in January allowed cities with non-partisan municipal elections to make such changes in an effort to save money and increase voter turnout by having local elections coincide with the general November election; savings for Perth Amboy are estimated at $50,000. As a result of the change, terms of the mayor and city council members which would have expired June 30, 2012, will be extended to December 31, 2012. Diaz had supported the move.

Diaz said the city agreed in federal court to pay fines of $250,000 and make $5.4 million in sewer improvements over 15 years to end the release of millions of gallons of sewage into the Raritan River and Arthur Kill each year in violation of the Clean Water Act. Statistics provided by the Environmental Protection Agency and the New Jersey Department of Environmental Protection indicate that the city discharges about 370 million gallons of sewage from homes and industrial wastewater flow into the Raritan River and Arthur Kill each year.
