= Senator Corman =

Senator Corman may refer to:

- Doyle Corman (1932–2019), Pennsylvania State Senate
- Jake Corman (born 1964), Pennsylvania State Senate
- Randy Corman (born 1960s), New Jersey State Senate
