= John J. Fay Jr. =

American politician (1927–2003)

John James Fay Jr. (June 8, 1927 – October 28, 2003) was an American schoolteacher turned Democratic Party politician who served on the Middlesex County Board of Chosen Freeholders and represented the 19th Legislative District in the New Jersey General Assembly from 1968 to 1974 and the New Jersey Senate from 1974 to 1978. As State Senator he was an advocate for the elderly in nursing homes and boarding houses, creating the post of Office of the Ombudsman for the Institutionalized Elderly within the New Jersey Department of the Public Advocate and serving as the first ombudsman in the post after losing a re-election bid in 1977.

Fay was born on June 8, 1927, in Elizabeth, where he graduated from St. Patrick High School. He enlisted in the United States Navy where he served as part of an Underwater Demolition Team. After completing his military service, Fay attended Seton Hall University where he majored in political history and science, and earned both a bachelor's and a master's. He taught history and economics at Linden High School for 20 years, starting in 1958.

His first elected office was on the Woodbridge Township council, where he served from 1964 to 1966. He was elected in 1966 to serve on the Middlesex County Board of Chosen Freeholders. Fay was elected to the New Jersey General Assembly in 1968 and became a member of the New Jersey Senate in 1974.

Fay drafted legislation that created the Office of the Ombudsman for the Institutionalized Elderly within the New Jersey Department of the Public Advocate, which is responsible for investing claims of abuse of those over age 60 in long-term care facilities. In the 1977 Democratic primaries, Laurence S. Weiss defeated Fay, and went on to win election. After Fay left office Governor Brendan Byrne named him in 1978 as the office's first ombudsman, a position he held until 1984. Other legislation Fay sponsored included campaign finance reform and farmland preservation. The New York Times posted its regrets at his departure from the Senate, calling him "a man of sardonic wit and considerable erudition". After a fire in a home for the elderly in Bradley Beach killed 23 on July 26, 1980, advocated on behalf of new legislation to protect the residents of boarding and rooming houses.

Fay served as a mentor to Jim McGreevey, who would later serve in the Assembly and State Senate before becoming Governor of New Jersey. After Fay's death, McGreevey recalled him as "a tremendous friend, a role model, a mentor, a statesman... a person of uncommon decency, integrity and courage."

Fay died at age 76 on October 28, 2003, of pancreatic cancer. He was survived by his wife, Carol Brown.

Woodbridge Township awards the John J. Fay Jr. Civic Award for dedicated public service on an annual basis, an award named in his memory, to residents who have served in elected or appointed office and served the community as a volunteer.
