= Benedictine Academy =

Defunct Catholic school in Union County, New Jersey, United States

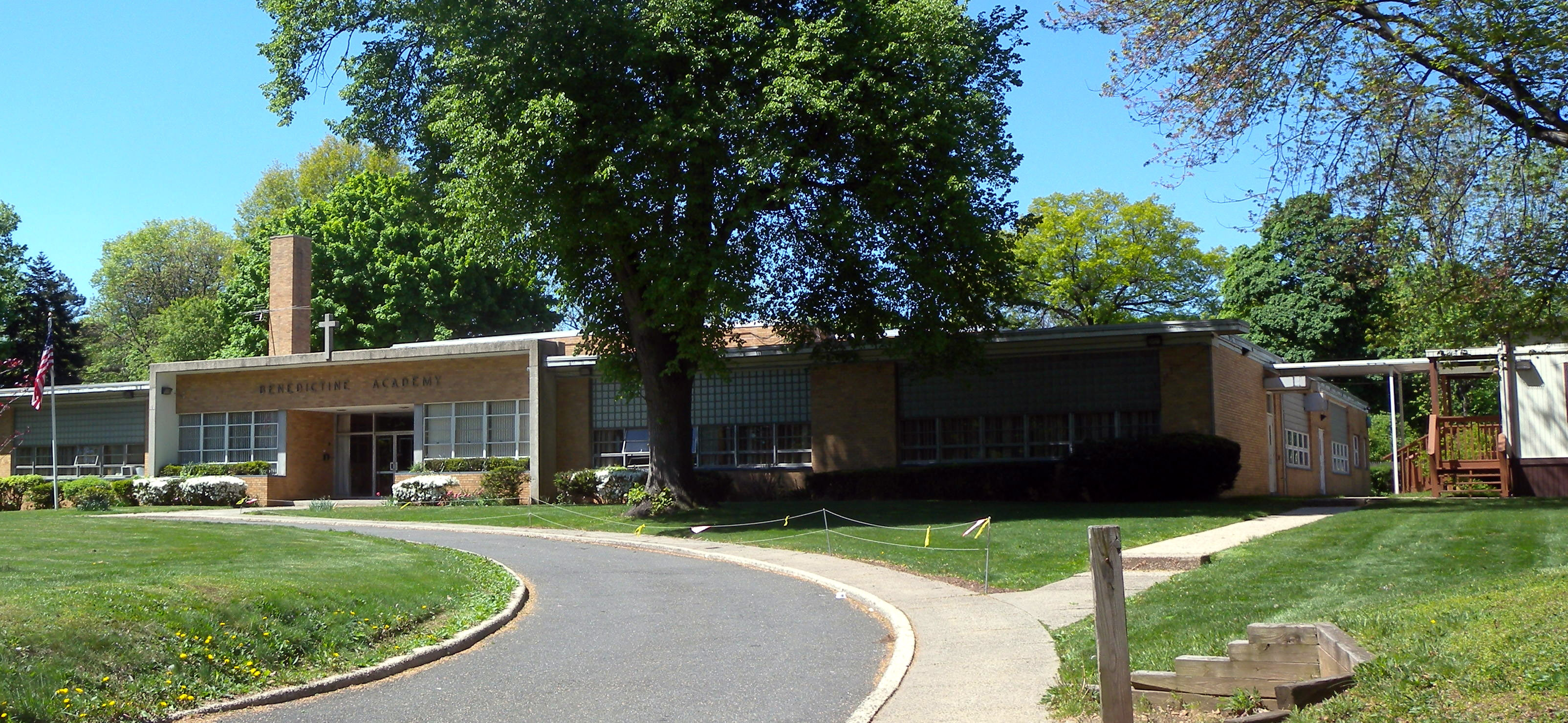

Location
- 840 North Broad Street; Elizabeth, (Union County), New Jersey 07208; United States
- 40°41′2″N 74°12′54″W

Information
- Type: Private, All-Girls
- Motto: Listen, Learn, Love and Lead... this is the Benedictine Way! (Whatever hurts my sister, hurts me. Whatever helps my sister, helps me.)
- Religious affiliation: Roman Catholic
- Established: 1915
- Closed: 2020
- School board: 310310
- NCES School ID: 00861514
- President: Sharon McHugh
- Administrator: Ashley Powell
- Faculty: 15.6 FTEs
- Grades: 9–12
- Student to teacher ratio: 8.1:1
- Colors: Green and white
- Athletics conference: Union County Interscholastic Athletic Conference
- Mascot: The Green Bee
- Team name: Green Bees
- Accreditation: Middle States Association of Colleges and Schools
- Yearbook: The Benedictine
- School fees: approx. $600.00
- Tuition: $7,950 (2016-17)
- Affiliation: Benedictine Sisters of Elizabeth
- Website: www.benedictineacad.org

Benedictine Academy was a Catholic parochial, college preparatory high school that served young women in ninth through twelfth grades in Elizabeth, in Union County, in the U.S. state of New Jersey. The school was opened in 1915 by the Benedictine Sisters of Elizabeth, Saint Walburga Monastery, and operated under the auspices of the Roman Catholic Archdiocese of Newark.

In the wake of declining enrollment, the school announced that it would close at the end of the 2019–20 school year. Compared to an enrollment in 2014-15 of 174 students, the school estimated that 2020-21 enrollment would be 115.

The school had been accredited by the Middle States Association of Colleges and Schools Commission on Elementary and Secondary Schools since 1996.

As of the 2019–20 school year, the school had an enrollment of 127 students and 15.6 classroom teachers (on an FTE basis), for a student–teacher ratio of 8.1:1. The school's student body was 42.5% (54) White, 26.8% (34) Black, 28.3% (36) Hispanic, 1.6% (2) two or more races and 0.8% (1) Asian. Benedictine Academy welcomed students of any race, color, national and ethnic origins. The school faculty comprised Benedictine Sisters, members of other religious communities and lay teachers, 70% of whom had advanced degrees.

== History ==
The school opened in 1915. In the 2014–15 school year its student body was 174. It had 122 students, 35 in the 12th grade, in spring 2020, and it was projected for 2020–21 that its student body would be 155, including 20 in the 9th grade. The school closed in spring 2020.

The school site was purchased for $5.5 million in 2022 by the Elizabeth Public Schools.

== Awards and recognition ==
In June 2011, Benedictine Academy was recognized as the Jefferson Awards for Public Service "Best New School" in recognition of programs developed at the school to combat bullying and human trafficking.

== Athletics ==
The Benedictine Academy Green Bees compete in the Union County Interscholastic Athletic Conference, which comprises public and private high schools in Union County and established following a 2010 reorganization of sports leagues in Northern New Jersey by the New Jersey State Interscholastic Athletic Association. With 200 students in grades 10-12, the school was classified by the NJSIAA for the 2019–20 school year as Non-Public B for most athletic competition purposes, which included schools with an enrollment of 37 to 366 students in that grade range (equivalent to Group I for public schools).

The girls spring track team was the Non-Public B state champion in 2010.

== Graduation requirements ==
Graduation requirements included: 4 years of English, Math, Religious Studies, and Physical Education/Health & Safety; 3 years of Science, Social Studies, and World Language; 2 years of American History, 1 year of World Culture, and 1 year of Art. Advanced Placement and Honors Courses are offered in Biology, Pre-Calculus, English Literature, U.S. History, French and Spanish. Elective courses are offered in Economics, Computer Technology, Psychology, Law, Media, and the Arts.

== Technology ==
The school has a computer lab, SMART boards in every classroom, a new interactive science lab, high-speed wireless Internet access for students, and an integrated laptop program.

== Notable alumni ==
- Lauren H. Carson (born 1954), member of the Rhode Island House of Representatives, representing the 75th District since 2015.
- Arline M. Friscia, politician who represented the 19th Legislative District in the New Jersey General Assembly from 1996 to 2002.
- Virginia Long (born 1942, class of 1959), former justice on the New Jersey Supreme Court

== Benedictine Sisters of Elizabeth, NJ ==
In September 1864, three Benedictine sisters arrived from Newark, New Jersey, at the request of Peter Henry Lemke, pastor of St. Michael's, who was in need of German-speaking sisters to teach at the parish school. In 1868, they became an independent congregation and moved to the newly built St. Walburga's Convent. The sisters taught at St. Henry's parish school, and also at an academy for girls established at St. Walburga's.

In 1903, they opened Our Lady of Victory sanitarium with a training school for nurses at Kingston, New York. The following year, services expanded to Benedictine Hospital on Mary's Avenue. The hospital was later taken over by HealthAlliance of the Hudson Valley.

In 1906, a convent and private school were established at Brooklands, DC. In 1923, the St. Walburga's Monastery re-located to North Broad Street. The sisters taught at elementary schools in the dioceses of Newark, Cleveland and Manchester. Benedictine Preschool opened in the fall of 1996. Due to declining enrollment with the availability of tuition-free programs in public schools, the preschool closed in 2019.
