= Randy Corman =

American politician (born 1960)

Member of the New Jersey Senate from the 19th district
- In office January 14, 1992 – January 11, 1994
- Preceded by: Laurence S. Weiss
- Succeeded by: Jim McGreevey

Personal details
- Born: September 25, 1960 (age 66) El Paso, Texas
- Party: Republican
- Education: Sayreville War Memorial High School
- Alma mater: Rutgers University

J. Randall "Randy" Corman (born September 25, 1960) is an American Republican Party politician who served a single term in the New Jersey Senate, from 1992 to 1994, where he represented the 19th Legislative District, which covers portions of Middlesex County.

== Biography ==
Corman was born in El Paso, Texas and raised in Sayreville, New Jersey, where he graduated from Sayreville War Memorial High School in 1978. He was inducted into the school's hall of fame in 2006. He graduated from Rutgers University in 1982.

He continues to reside in Sayreville with his wife and 4 children.

== Elective office and government service ==
Together with Emery Z. Toth, Corman ran for Assembly in the 19th District in 1989, losing to incumbent Democrat George Otlowski and Jim McGreevey. As a councilmember in Sayreville, Corman had opposed the construction of an incinerator project in Sayreville based on environmental concerns that did not justify the development on the former NL Industries site.

In 1991, Corman ran for the Senate in what had traditionally been a solidly Democratic district, as part of a campaign that targeted the Democrats statewide as being responsible for higher taxes. As part of the Republican landslide that year in the New Jersey Legislature in the wake of Governor of New Jersey Jim Florio's $2.8 billion tax increase package, Corman was elected to the Senate together with running mates Stephen A. Mikulak and Ernest L. Oros in the New Jersey General Assembly, defeating Laurence S. Weiss in the Senate and incumbent Democrat Thomas J. Deverin and his running mate Jay Ziznewski in the Assembly. After one term in office, Corman lost his seat in the Senate to Democrat Jim McGreevey, one of three Senate seats that the Democrats picked up in that year's election cycle.

Corman sponsored one of a set of bills proposed in October 1992 that would increase penalties for motor vehicle theft, arguing that it deserves more than "a slap on the wrist". He cited an incident in which a juvenile sought to be arrested so that he could join his friends in a juvenile detention center, with Corman insisting that juvenile car thieves "should not look at incarceration like summer camp".

In December 1992, Corman introduced legislation in the Senate that would subject "anyone conducting unauthorized surveillance of customers in a retail business in New Jersey" to arrest on disorderly conduct charges; New York City had been sending investigators to shopping malls in New Jersey to record the license plate numbers of vehicle from New York State as part of an effort to determine if shoppers from New York were liable for use tax on purchases made in the Garden State.

Corman was named as director of law for the New Jersey Turnpike Authority in April 1997, a position paying an annual salary of $95,000, as part of what The Record described as "a parade of former Middlesex County officials who have landed lucrative jobs at the toll-road agency".

Corman is a judge with the Middlesex County Worker's Compensation Court, having been nominated by then-Governor Chris Christie in 2013.

New Jersey Senate
Preceded by Laurence S. Weiss	Member of the New Jersey Senate from the 19th district January 14, 1992–January 11, 1994	Succeeded by Jim McGreevey
