= Arline Friscia =

American politician (1934–2019)

Member of the New Jersey General Assembly from the 19th district
- In office January 9, 1996 – January 13, 2004
- Preceded by: Stephen A. Mikulak; Ernest L. Oros
- Succeeded by: Joseph Vas

Personal details
- Born: November 13, 1934 Newark, U.S.
- Died: October 16, 2019 (aged 84) Edison, U.S.
- Party: Democratic
- Other political affiliations: Republican (2003)
- Education: Caldwell University (BA); Seton Hall University (MA)

Arline M. Friscia (November 13, 1934 – October 16, 2019) was an American politician who served in the New Jersey General Assembly from 1996 to 2004, where she represented the 19th Legislative District. Originally elected as a Democrat, Friscia switched to the Republican Party in 2003 after losing organization support for her re-election bid from the Democratic Party in that year's primary.

== Early life and education ==
Friscia was born in Newark, and attended public schools in Newark and high school at Benedictine Academy. She earned her undergraduate degree in music from Caldwell University and an M.A. from Seton Hall University in Administration and Supervision.

== Career ==
Prior to becoming a politician, Friscia worked as a school teacher and a field representative for the New Jersey Education Association. Before taking office in the Assembly, Friscia served on the Woodbridge Township Council from 1988 to 1991.

Democrats statewide saw a net gain of three seats in the Assembly in the 1995 elections, with two of the pickups coming in the 19th District where Friscia and John S. Wisniewski knocked off the Republican incumbents Stephen A. Mikulak and Ernest L. Oros. She was re-elected with Wisniewski in 1997, 1999 and 2001. While in the Assembly, Friscia served as Associate Minority Leader starting in 1998 and was a member of the Labor Committee and the Senior Issues and Community Services Committee. In the Assembly, Friscia sponsored a bill that would expand the state's family leave law by allowing those on leave to collect unemployment for 12 weeks and would make New Jersey the first state in the nation to adopt a provision requiring all business with 50 or more employees to hire back an employee at the same or comparable position after they return from their leave.

In the 2003 Democratic primary, Friscia lost the official endorsement of the Middlesex County Democratic Organization, which went instead to Perth Amboy mayor Joseph Vas. Friscia objected to being knocked off the party line, stating that "a history of women being knocked off tickets in Middlesex County" exists as "part of a long sad history of the Democratic Party disenfranchising qualified women". Following her defeat in the primary and after briefly considering an independent run for the Assembly, the Middlesex County Republican offered her a position to run on their ticket in the general election. Friscia was defeated by the two Democratic candidates, incumbent Wisniewski and Vas, in the general election that November.

Friscia reregisted as a Democrat after her departure from the Assembly.

== Death ==
She died at the JFK Medical Center in Edison on October 16, 2019, at the age of 84.
