= Golan Cipel =

Israeli consultant (born 1968)

Personal details
- Born: 1968 (age 57–58) Tel Aviv, Israel
- Education: New York Institute of Technology (BA, MA)
- Known for: Role in a scandal surrounding Jim McGreevey

Military service
- Allegiance: Israel
- Branch/service: Israeli Navy
- Rank: Lieutenant

Golan Cipel (Hebrew: גולן ציפל; born 1968) is an Israeli consultant most known for his role in a scandal surrounding American politician Jim McGreevey.

== Biography ==
Cipel was born in Tel Aviv in 1968 and grew up in the city of Rishon LeZion.

Cipel served in the Israel Defense Forces (IDF) for five years as a naval officer, eventually rising to the rank of lieutenant. Following his service in the Israeli Navy, Cipel held several positions in government. He began his career in 1992 as parliamentary aide in the Israeli Parliament, the Knesset, where he was responsible for policy formation, as well as the drafting of legislation. In 1994, he joined the Israeli Ministry of Foreign Affairs as chief information officer at the Consulate General of Israel in New York, where he was responsible for presenting the Israeli government perspective to the American media and public. In 1999, Cipel was appointed the spokesperson for the municipality of Rishon LeZion, Israel.

Cipel holds a bachelor's degree and a master's degree in communications arts from the New York Institute of Technology.

=== Jim McGreevey ===
Cipel met American politician Jim McGreevey in Israel in 2000. Cipel relocated to the United States to work for McGreevey's 2001 campaign for governor of New Jersey as a liaison to the Jewish community.

In 2002, following his election as governor of New Jersey, McGreevey appointed Cipel as homeland security adviser at a salary of $110,000. Members of the New Jersey Legislature questioned the appointment, and the appointment was criticized because Cipel appeared unqualified for the position. In addition, Cipel could not obtain a security approval from the federal government, as he was Israeli and not a U.S. citizen; therefore, the FBI and the Secret Service would not provide him with intelligence. (In a 2004 interview, Cipel stated that his situation had been intentionally misrepresented by the governor's office and asserted that he had never actually been responsible for internal security under the governor.)

McGreevey assisted Cipel in obtaining a townhouse near McGreevey's home. Cipel reportedly stated that he needed to live near the governor because his job involved being on call on a 24-hour basis. "According to the Star-Ledger newspaper, McGreevey even accompanied Cipel on a final walk-through of the townhouse, which the real estate agent said she found odd".

In March 2002, Cipel stepped down from his Homeland Security position and was reassigned to an advisor position regarding government operations. In August 2002, Cipel resigned from the McGreevey administration.

On the afternoon of August 12, 2004, faced with threats from Cipel's lawyer, Allen Lowy, that Cipel would file a sexual harassment lawsuit against him in Mercer County Court, McGreevey held a press conference announcing that he had "engaged in an adult consensual affair with another man" (whom his aides immediately named as Cipel) and that he would resign effective November 15, 2004. New Jersey political circles had speculated about McGreevey's sexual orientation and questions about his relationship with Cipel had been alluded to in the media. For his part, Cipel later asserted that he was heterosexual and denied having had an affair with McGreevey; Cipel has contended that McGreevey subjected him to sexual harassment and sexual assault and then fired him when his advances were rejected. In his own words, Cipel claims he was one of many victims of McGreevey's sexual harassment, that he had "no romantic affair" with the governor, but rather was taken advantage of.
