= Alan Karcher =

American politician

Member of the New Jersey General Assembly from the 19th district
- In office January 8, 1974 – January 9, 1990 Serving with George Otlowski
- Preceded by: District created
- Succeeded by: Jim McGreevey

Speaker of the New Jersey General Assembly
- In office January 12, 1982 – January 14, 1986
- Preceded by: Christopher Jackman
- Succeeded by: Chuck Hardwick

Personal details
- Born: May 19, 1943 New Brunswick, New Jersey, U.S.
- Died: July 26, 1999 (aged 56) Neptune Township, New Jersey, U.S.
- Party: Democratic

Alan J. Karcher (May 19, 1943 – July 26, 1999) was an American Democratic Party politician whose highest office was Speaker of the New Jersey General Assembly. He was a member of the Assembly from 1974 to 1990 and was a one-time candidate for the Democratic nomination for Governor of New Jersey.

== Biography ==
Politics, and service in the state Assembly, was a family tradition for Alan Karcher. His father, Joseph T. Karcher, served in the Assembly from 1930 to 1933 and his great uncle, John J. Quaid, served from 1898 to 1900.

Karcher was born in New Brunswick in 1943. He graduated from Rutgers University in 1964 and from Rutgers School of Law–Newark in 1967. He was admitted to the bar associations in New Jersey and Washington D.C. in the same year. He was later admitted to the Florida bar. In addition to his law degree, Mr. Karcher earned a master's degree in liberal studies from the New School for Social Research in New York City.

Between 1967 and 1969, he served Governor Richard J. Hughes as assistant counsel and secretary to the governor. After leaving Gov. Hughes' staff, Mr. Karcher went into private legal practice, which continued during his political career.

Karcher represented the 19th Legislative District, based in Middlesex County, for 17 years. He succeeded Christopher Jackman as speaker of the Assembly, serving from 1982 to 1985 during an activist Legislature. He played a key role in the adoption of the state's first Uniform Penal code, which provided guidelines for priority sentences. He also fought battles for senior citizens, tax reform, workers' rights, environmental cleanup, job creation and additional support for education and the arts. In 1982, he argued against the restoration of the death penalty and in favor of using the resources that would go into enforcing the death penalty for law-enforcement measures.

Karcher was a delegate to the Democratic National Convention in both 1984 and 1988. After leaving elected office in 1990, Karcher continued in his law practice and remained active in partisan politics, mainly as Democratic chair of Mercer County, and became a political mentor to many budding politicians at the local, county and state levels.

In 1998, Karcher published his book, New Jersey's Multiple Municipal Madness, in which he advocated that many of the state's 566 municipalities be eliminated, or at least combined. Karcher was a resident of Princeton Borough at the time of his death on July 26, 1999.

Alan Karcher's daughter, Ellen Karcher, was elected in 2003 to represent a Monmouth County district in the New Jersey Senate, making her the fourth generation of Karcher's family to serve in the New Jersey Legislature.

Political offices
Preceded by Christopher Jackman	Speaker of the New Jersey General Assembly; 1982 – 1985	Succeeded by Chuck Hardwick
