= Laurence S. Weiss =

American politician (1919–2003)

Member of the New Jersey Senate from the 19th Legislative District
- In office January 10, 1978 – January 14, 1992
- Preceded by: John J. Fay Jr.
- Succeeded by: Randy Corman

Personal details
- Born: May 6, 1919 Hungary
- Died: December 27, 2003 (aged 84) Hollywood, Florida
- Party: Democratic

Laurence S. Weiss (May 6, 1919 – December 27, 2003) was a Hungarian-born American politician who served in the New Jersey Senate from 1978 to 1992, where he represented the 19th Legislative District, which covers portions of Middlesex County.

== Life ==
Weiss settled in Jersey City, New Jersey and then Carteret after his family emigrated from Hungary to the United States when he was three years old, joining grandparents who had moved there earlier. He attended the Carteret public schools, graduating from Carteret High School, and spent a year at Middlesex County College. He briefly operated a gas station in Newark, before enlisting in the United States Army during World War II, attending Officer Candidate School at Fort Benning, Georgia where he earned a commission as a second lieutenant.

In 1943, Weiss was part of the 94th Infantry Division and was assigned to the Pacific Theater of Operations, serving in New Caledonia and New Guinea. There he was named as a platoon leader for the 24th Infantry Division, and was ultimately promoted to captain and company commander. He saw action in the New Guinea campaign, in the Philippine Islands and in the earliest landings in Japan following V-J Day. He was recalled to active duty during the Korean War, serving until 1952 as a major with the Army's Inspector General. During his service he was awarded the Silver Star, Bronze Star Medal and the Purple Heart, in addition to other citations.

After completing his military service he returned to the American Petroleum Corporation of Perth Amboy, becoming the company's president in 1960. Weiss served on the Middlesex County Planning Board and was active with the Woodbridge Township Public Library and was involved there in major construction projects.

In the 1977 Democratic primaries, Weiss defeated incumbent Democrat John J. Fay Jr., and went on to win election. During his 14 years in office Weiss served on the Agriculture Committee, State Government Committee, Education Committee, Oversight Committee and the Joint Legislative Commission, as well as 11 years as chair of the State Finance, Revenue and Appropriation Committee and six years leading the Joint Appropriations Committee. Weiss was one of the initial authors and key supporters of Governor of New Jersey Jim Florio's $2.8 billion tax increase package in 1991, and then pushed on behalf of its repeal after he was defeated in his re-election bid. Republicans statewide and Randy Corman in the 19th District used the tax increase as a major campaign issue, with Weiss noting his role as chairman of the committee that drafted and approved the budget and saying "I'm not the target, I'm the bull's eye".

Weiss died at age 84 on December 27, 2003, at Hollywood Medical Center in Hollywood, Florida. He was survived by his wife, the former Edith Gelber, whom he married in 1941, as well as by a daughter, a son and four grandchildren.
