= Stephen A. Mikulak =

American politician

Member of the New Jersey General Assembly from the 19th district
- In office January 14, 1992 – January 9, 1996 Serving with Ernest L. Oros
- Preceded by: Jim McGreevey; George Otlowski
- Succeeded by: Arline Friscia; John Wisniewski

Personal details
- Born: October 15, 1948 East Orange, New Jersey
- Died: June 16, 2014 (aged 65) Edison, New Jersey
- Party: Republican

Stephen A. Mikulak (October 15, 1948 – June 16, 2014) was an American Republican Party politician who served two terms in the New Jersey General Assembly, from 1992 to 1996, where he represented the 19th Legislative District, which covers portions of Middlesex County.

== Early life and education ==
Born in East Orange, New Jersey, and raised in Newark, New Jersey, Mikulak graduated from Vailsburg High School in 1966. He earned undergraduate and graduate degrees from Rutgers University. Mikulak was of Ukrainian heritage.

== Political career ==
Mikulak, of Woodbridge Township, New Jersey, ran for the General Assembly in what had traditionally been a solidly Democratic district, as part of a campaign that targeted the Democrats statewide as being responsible for higher taxes. As part of the Republican landslide that year in the New Jersey Legislature in the wake of Governor of New Jersey Jim Florio's $2.8 billion tax increase package, Mikulak was elected to the Assembly together with running mate Ernest L. Oros and Randy Corman in the Senate, defeating incumbent Democrat Thomas J. Deverin and his running mate Jay Ziznewski. Mikulak was re-elected to the Assembly in 1993, together with Oros, though Corman lost his seat in the Senate to Democrat Jim McGreevey.

A bill proposed by Mikulak in June 1992 would ban the use of photo radar to ticket drivers caught speeding on the state's roadways, arguing that "bureaucracy has found ways of making things happen in the past that they said they weren't going to do" and that the practice of dispensing such tickets had to be prevented before any police agencies attempted to use a photo radar system. In June 1992, Mikulak sponsored legislation in the Assembly that would increase the speed limit on 400 miles (640 km) of state highways to 65 miles per hour (105 km/h) from the previous 55 miles per hour (89 km/h) limit, arguing that drivers were not respecting the lower speed limit and the fact that the highways had been constructed to accommodate the faster traffic.

On July 28, 1993, Governor of New Jersey Jim Florio signed a bill sponsored by Mikulak that passed with bipartisan support in both houses of the legislature which would impose the death penalty on terrorists convicted of killing anyone in New Jersey. Mikulak proposed the bill in March 1993 after visiting a room where four people had been killed in the 1993 World Trade Center bombing.

In the 1995 elections, Oros and Mikulak were unseated by Arline Friscia and John S. Wisniewski, two of the five seats that the Democrats picked up in that cycle. Mikulak ran for the New Jersey Senate in 1997, losing to Democrat Joseph Vitale by a 60.2%-39.8% margin for the open seat vacated by Jim McGreevey.

== Death ==
He died on June 16, 2014, in Edison, New Jersey at age 65.
