= John Wisniewski =

American politician (born 1962)

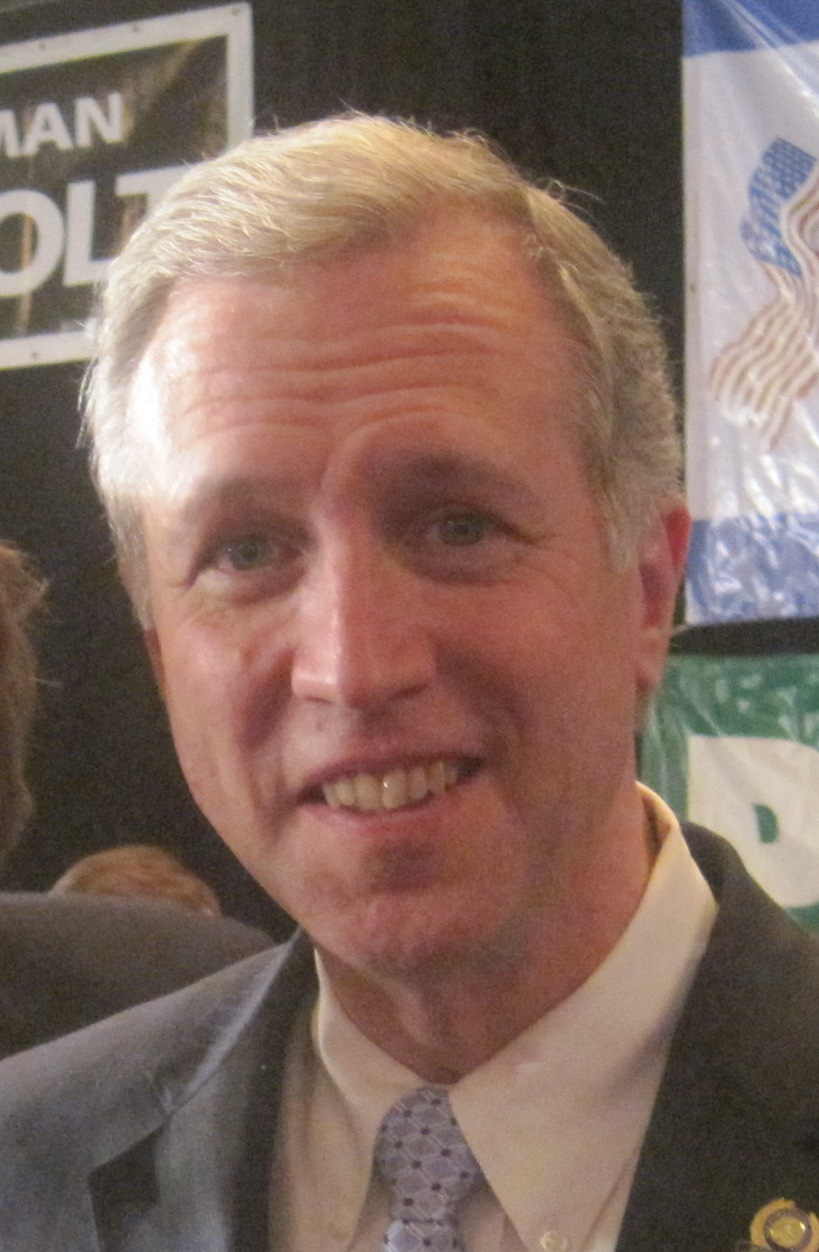

Member of the New Jersey General Assembly from the 19th district
- In office January 9, 1996 – January 9, 2018
- Preceded by: Stephen A. Mikulak; Ernest L. Oros
- Succeeded by: Yvonne Lopez

Chair of the New Jersey Democratic State Committee
- In office 2011–2013
- Preceded by: Joseph Cryan
- Succeeded by: John Currie

Personal details
- Born: June 28, 1962 (age 64) Perth Amboy, New Jersey, U.S.
- Party: Democratic
- Spouse: Deborah McLaughlin (1990–present)
- Children: 3
- Education: Rutgers University, New Brunswick (BA); Seton Hall University (JD)
- Website: Campaign website

John Scott Wisniewski (/wɪsˈnɛski/ wiss-NES-kee; born June 28, 1962) is an American attorney and politician. A Democratic, he served in the New Jersey General Assembly from 1996 to 2018, representing the 19th Legislative District.

Wisniewki served as chairman of Bernie Sanders' 2016 presidential campaign in New Jersey. He was an unsuccessful candidate for Governor of New Jersey in the 2017 election, losing the Democratic primary to Phil Murphy. In 2024, he became a commissioner of the New Jersey Turnpike Authority.

== Early life, education, and law career ==
Wisniewski was born on June 28, 1962, in Perth Amboy, New Jersey. He is of Polish descent, and the son of a factory worker. He attended Sacred Heart Elementary School in South Amboy and Sayreville War Memorial High School in nearby Sayreville, New Jersey.

In 1984, he received a B.A. from Rutgers University in English / Economics and was awarded a J.D. from the Seton Hall University School of Law in 1987, where he was a classmate of New Jersey Governor Chris Christie.

Wisniewski is an adjunct professor at Monmouth University.

He also owns and runs a general practice law firm, Wisniewski and Associates, L.L.C., based out of Sayreville.

== Political career ==
Before joining the General Assembly, Wisniewski served on the Sayreville Cable Television Advisory Board, the Middlesex County Senior Citizen Housing Task Force, and the Middlesex County Planning Board. He has also served on the Sayreville Board of Education's Building Utilization Committee. Wisniewski currently serves on the board of trustees for the United Way of Central New Jersey and is an Executive Board Member of the Middlesex County Arts and Education Council.

=== Legislative career ===
Democrats statewide saw a net gain of three seats in the Assembly in the 1995 elections, with two of the pickups coming in the 19th District where Arline Friscia and Wisniewski knocked off the Republican incumbents Stephen A. Mikulak and Ernest L. Oros.

In the Assembly, Wisniewski introduced legislation that includes the Work First New Jersey Act, which required individuals to work at jobs or in community services as a condition of their benefits, the Dormitory Safety Act which required the installation of sprinklers in all dormitories, the School Bus Enhanced Safety Inspection Act which created new ways and standards by which a school bus was inspected, and the Athletic Training Licensure Act which required athletic trainers to be licensed. Assemblyman Wisniewski also sponsored the bill that was signed into law which increased the property tax reduction for Veterans and seniors, legislation designed to strengthen Megan's Law by keeping sexual predators away from areas where children go to school and play, legislation which required newly constructed elevators in residential buildings to accommodate stretchers, legislation which required the implementation of a fire command structure in mutual aid fires, legislation which required that cell phone use be noted in traffic accidents, legislation that established a penalty for the theft of someone's personal identification information, and legislation which established a scholarship program for the families of the victims of the September 11 terrorist attacks.

On January 27, 2010, Wisniewski was selected to succeed Joseph Cryan as the Chairman of the New Jersey Democratic State Committee. He was succeeded by John Currie in 2013.

In 2011, Wisniewski was the Democratic Co-chair of the 2011 New Jersey Apportionment Commission, the group charged with redrawing the lines for the legislative districts following the 2010 census. Along with State Senator Loretta Weinberg, Wisniewski played a major role in uncovering the Fort Lee lane closure scandal. He was a co-chair of the New Jersey Legislative Select Committee on Investigation tasked with investigating the scandal.

In 2013, Wisniewski joined the overwhelming majority of his fellow Democratic Party members in Middlesex County in endorsing Frank Pallone, in a special election for U.S. Senate after the death of longtime New Jersey Senator Frank Lautenberg. He later endorsed the Democratic Party's ultimate nominee, Cory Booker.

Each of the forty districts in the New Jersey Legislature has one representative in the New Jersey Senate and two members in the New Jersey General Assembly. The other representatives from the 19th District from the 2012-2013 Legislative Session were:

- Senator Joseph Vitale
- Assemblyman Craig Coughlin

In August 2015, Wisniewski voted in favor of funding Planned Parenthood in New Jersey, joining prominent New Jersey Democrats, including Sheila Oliver and Patrick Diegnan. Wisniewski previously voted five times to outlaw or restrict access to abortion in New Jersey.

He has also expressed that he would vote in favor of a gas tax hike only if Governor Christie was going to sign it into law.

Wisniewski was reelected in 2015 by a wide margin. He received the endorsement of numerous local newspapers, including the Home News Tribune, who also endorsed his running mate Craig Coughlin and fellow Central Jersey Nancy Pinkin and Diegnan.

==== Transportation Committee ====
In the Assembly he has served as the Deputy Speaker since 2004, was the Assistant Majority Leader from 2002 to 2003 and was the Deputy Minority Conference Leader 1998–2001. Wisniewski serves in the Assembly on the Transportation, Public Works and Independent Authorities Committee (as chair) and the Environment and Solid Waste Committee. Since 2000, he has chaired the state Fire Safety Commission.

In his role as Chairman of the Assembly Transportation Committee, Assemblyman Wisniewski led a fact finding probe into the state's E-ZPass system. Assemblyman Wisniewski is a prime sponsor of the Motor Vehicle Security and Customer Service Act which was signed into law on January 28, 2003. He was a prime sponsor of A-3392 which would consolidate two of the state's toll road agencies.

==== "Bridgegate" Fort Lee lane closure scandal investigation ====
He led the investigation into the Fort Lee lane closure scandal. He expressed grave skepticism about Christie's claim that he did not know his aides had ordered lanes closed on the George Washington Bridge, and believes that the closures were illegal. He has also said that if Christie is involved, it would be an impeachable offense.

=== New Jersey Chairman for Bernie Sanders ===
U.S. Senator Bernie Sanders announced on January 4, 2016, that Wisniewski would lead his New Jersey operation in his campaign for the democratic nomination in the 2016 United States presidential election. Wisniewski cited Sanders' efforts to reduce income inequality and take money out of politics as the main reasons for his endorsement. Being the only elected politician in New Jersey to endorse Sanders, Wisniewski was at the forefront of the Senator's campaign in New Jersey, attending mock debates and hosting fundraisers. Clinton won the New Jersey Democratic primary by a two-to-one margin.

=== 2017 gubernatorial campaign ===
Wisniewski announced his candidacy for the Democratic nomination for New Jersey governor in the 2017 election in November 2016. The contest between Wisniewski and Phil Murphy attracted attention because the two had supported Sanders and Clinton, respectively, in the preceding year's Democratic presidential primaries.

On June 6, 2017, Wisniewski lost the primary election, coming in third place with 21.6% of the vote. Murphy won the nomination with 48.4% of the vote; Wisniewski also finished behind Jim Johnson. Murphy also won every county in New Jersey except for Salem County, which Wisniewski won. Wisniewski subsequently supported Murphy in the campaign against Republican nominee Kim Guadagno.

=== Post-Assembly career ===
In 2024, Wisniewski reentered government as a commissioner of the New Jersey Turnpike Authority, being named to the seat by Assembly speaker and former running mate Craig Coughlin. His appointment did not require Senate confirmation.

== Personal life ==
He is married to Deborah (née McLaughlin) and has three daughters.

They currently reside in Sayreville.

New Jersey General Assembly
| Preceded by Ernest L. Oros | Member of the New Jersey Assembly from the 19th district 1996–2018; Served alongside: Arline Friscia, Joseph Vas, Craig Coughlin | Succeeded by Yvonne Lopez |
Party political offices
| Preceded by Joseph Cryan | Chair of the New Jersey Democratic State Committee; 2010–2013 | Succeeded by John Currie |
