= Yvonne Lopez =

American politician (born 1957)

Yvonne M. Lopez
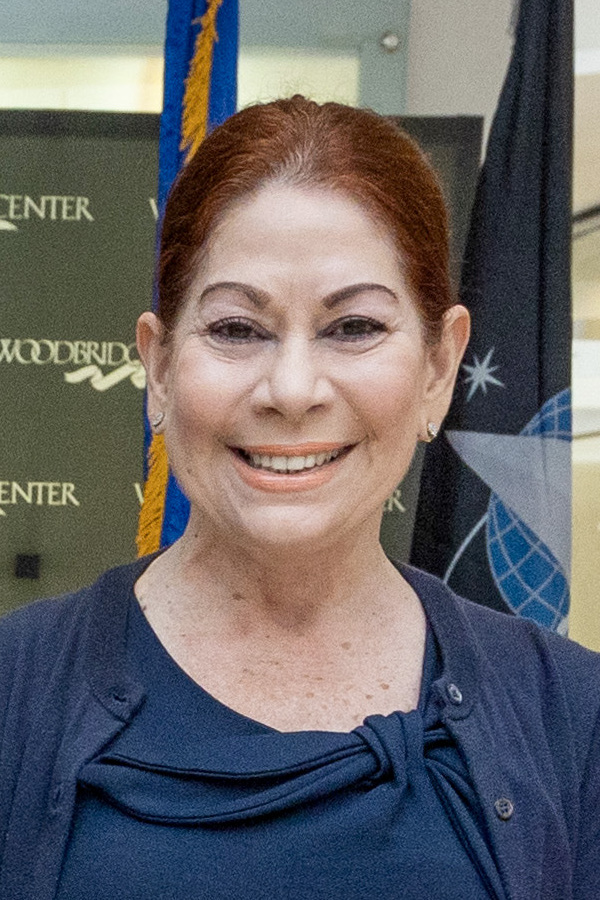

Member of the New Jersey General Assembly from the 19th district
- Incumbent
- Assumed office January 9, 2018 Serving with Craig Coughlin
- Preceded by: John Wisniewski

Personal details
- Born: July 28, 1957 (age 69) Perth Amboy, New Jersey, U.S.
- Party: Democratic
- Education: Rutgers University
- Occupation: Administrator
- Website: Legislative Website

Yvonne M. Lopez (born July 28, 1957) is an American politician from New Jersey. A resident of Perth Amboy, she has represented the 19th Legislative District in the New Jersey General Assembly as a member of the Democratic Party since January 9, 2018.

== Early life and education ==
Lopez was born on July 28, 1957 in Perth Amboy, Middlesex County, New Jersey. She attended Rutgers University.

== Career ==
Prior to entering politics, Lopez worked in the private sector. She served in the Community Relations department of Wachovia Bank for a period of 20 years from 1987 to 2007, eventually becoming a vice-president.

Lopez later became CEO and executive director of the Puerto Rican Association for Human Development (PRAHD). Under her leadership, the PRAHD worked with the Northeast Regional Council of Carpenters to create a training program for underemployed and unemployed individuals.

In 2016, she was honored by the city of Perth Amboy for her work serving in the board of Perth Amboy's Business Improvement District (BID). As of 2023, she was a member of the New Jersey Puerto Rico Commission.

== Member of the New Jersey Assembly (2018-present) ==
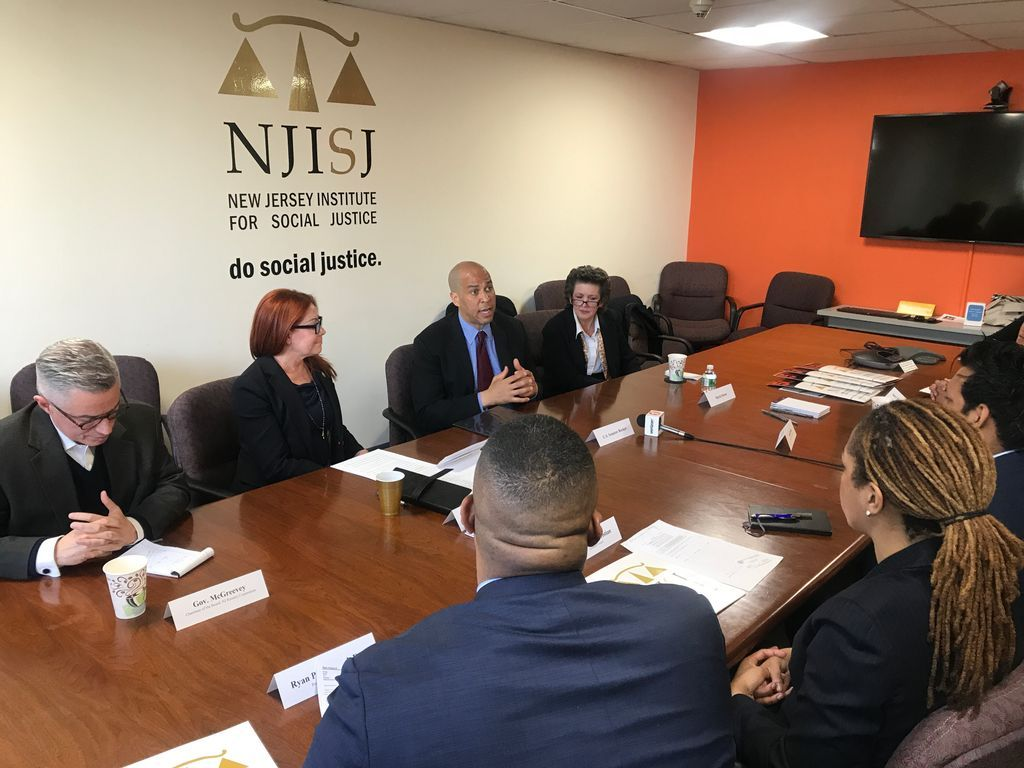
Yvonne Lopez with Cory Booker at the New Jersey Institute for Social Justice in 2018.

Lopez first ran for a seat in the New Jersey General Assembly in the 2017 election. She won the seat, which was relinquished by her predecessor John Wisniewski after he chose to run for Governor of New Jersey in the 2017 election. Lopez was reelected in the 2019, 2021, and 2023 elections.

Each district in the New Jersey Legislature is represented by one state senator and two members of the General Assembly Alongside with Lopez, the 19th District is represented in the current session by Senator Joe F. Vitale (D) and fellow assemblymember Craig Coughlin (D).

=== Tenure ===
In 2020, Lopez was appointed to serve as vice chair of the National Hispanic Caucus of State Legislators' Latino Voting and Elections Task Force.

In 2024, Lopez began preparing legislation to prohibit landlords operating in New Jersey from using rent-setting algorithms that increase costs for renters.

==== Committee memberships ====
In the 221st New Jersey Assembly session (2024-2024), she is chair of the Housing Committee, vice chair of the Community Development and Women's Affairs Committee, and a member of the Transportation and Independent Authorities Committee.

== Electoral history ==
=== New Jersey General Assembly ===
19th Legislative District General Election, 2023
Party	Candidate	Votes	%
Democratic	Craig J. Coughlin (incumbent)	18,808	31.4
Democratic	Yvonne Lopez (incumbent)	18,254	30.5
Republican	Marilyn Colon	11,496	19.2
Republican	Sam Raval	10,740	17.9
Libertarian	David Diez	619	1.0
Total votes		59,917	100.0
Democratic hold			
Democratic hold			

New Jersey general election, 2021
Party	Candidate	Votes	%
Democratic	Craig Coughlin (Incumbent)	26,529	29.15
Democratic	Yvonne Lopez (Incumbent)	26,057	28.63
Republican	Anthony "Tony" Gallo	19,337	21.24
Republican	Bruce Banko	19,098	20.98
Total votes		91,021	100.0

New Jersey general election, 2017
Party	Candidate	Votes	%	±%
Democratic	Craig Coughlin (Incumbent)	25,708	35.6	0.0
Democratic	Yvonne Lopez	24,830	34.4	▼1.9
Republican	Deepak Malhotra	10,709	14.8	0.0
Republican	Amarjit K. Riar	9,436	13.1	▼0.2
Quality of Life	William Cruz	1,488	2.1	N/A
Total votes		72,171	100.0	

New Jersey General Assembly
Preceded by John Wisniewski	Member of the New Jersey General Assembly for the 19th District; January 9, 2018–present With: Craig Coughlin	Succeeded by Incumbent
