= Mayor of Perth Amboy, New Jersey =

The current mayor of Perth Amboy is Helmin Caba, who was elected on December 15, 2020, after defeating Wilda Diaz, and was sworn in on January 1, 2021.

Perth Amboy, New Jersey is governed under the Mayor-Council system of municipal government under the Faulkner Act. Members of the City Council are elected at-large on a non-partisan basis to four-year terms of office on a staggered basis, with two or three seats coming up for election in even years. The mayor also serves a four-year term of office, which is up for election the same year that two council seats are up for vote.

== History ==
A royal charter was issued on August 4, 1718. Perth Amboy was incorporated as a city on December 21, 1784.

In October 2010, the City Council voted to shift the city's non-partisan elections from May to November, with the first balloting held in conjunction with the General Election in November 2012. Terms run from January 1 to December 31.

== Mayors ==
The mayors are:

Mayor	Birth and death	Term	Notes
Helmin Caba	(born 1973)	2021–present	He has served for 5 years, 34 days.
Wilda Diaz	(born 1964)	2008 to 2020	Diaz was the first Latina mayor in New Jersey, and was the first female mayor of Perth Amboy. She was defeated by Helmin Caba in the December 15, 2020, runoff election; having served as mayor for 3 terms and 12 years.
Joseph Vas	(born 1955)	1990 to 2008	He served as mayor for 18 years. On May 20, 2009, Vas was indicted by a federal grand jury for six counts of mail fraud, one count of misapplication of funds, two counts of making false statements to the Federal Election Commission, one count of making false statements to federal agents, and one count of making contributions to a federal candidate in the name of others.
George John Otlowski	(1912–2009)	1976 to 1990	He served for 14 years.
Alexander Jankowski		1972 to 1976	The change of municipal government to direct mayoral election, led to election of Jankowski.
...		1971	
James J. Flynn, Jr.		1950 to 1970	He served for 20 years.
...		1941 to 1949	
Edward James Patten	(1905-1994)	1934 to 1940	He served for 6 years.
...		1927 to 1933	
William C. Wilson (mayor)		1921 to 1926	He served for 5 years.
John F. Tenbroeck Jr.		1918 to 1920	
...		1896 to 1917	
E. W. Barnes (mayor)		1895	
E. R. Pierce		1893	
...		1882 to 1893	
Uriah Burdge Watson	(1838-1919)	1881	He was also President of Middlesex County Bank when money went missing.
Eber H. Hall		1879 to 1880	
William Paterson (mayor)		1874 to 1878	This was his fourth term.
John G. Garretson		1872 to 1873	
Joseph L. Crowell		1870 to 1871	
James M. Chapman		1869	
Alfred Hall (mayor)		1863 to 1868	He served for 5 years.
Joseph L. Crowell		1862	
Edward I. Hall		1861	
William Paterson (mayor)		1858 to 1860	This was his third term.
...		1857	
William Paterson (mayor)		1856	This was his second term.
Solomon Andrews	(1806-1872)	1855	This was his third term.
Joseph D. Forbes		1854	
Solomon Andrews	(1806-1872)	1853	This was his second term.
Theodore Frederick King, M.D.	(1804-1868)	1852	He was a physician.
Lewis Compton (mayor)		1851	He was related to Lewis Compton.
Solomon Andrews	(1806-1872)	1849	This was his first term.
Lawrence Kearny	(1789–1868)	1848	
Francis William Brinley	(1796-1859)	1847	This was his second term.
William Paterson (mayor)		1846	This was his first term.
Francis William Brinley	(1796-1859)	1845	This was his first term. He served as Surveyor General of New Jersey from 1845 to 1859.
James Harriott		1844	
James Alexander Nichols	(1806-1880)	1840	
Joseph Marsh (mayor)		1834	
James Parker II	(1776–1868)	1831 to 1833	This appears to be James Parker II (1776–1868)
John Ratoone	(1744-1823)	1808	A Perth Amboy merchant, he had carefully concealed his work as a spy for the British during the Revolutionary war. Name also spelled "John Rattoon".
Thomas Farmer (mayor)		1785	
James Parker I	(1725–1797)	1784	This appears to be James Parker I (1725–1797). Perth Amboy was incorporated as a city on December 21, 1784. James Parker was the first Mayor of Perth Amboy, New Jersey, after incorporation. James Parker Sr. (1725–1797) was the father and James Parker Sr. (1776–1868) was the son. The father may have served the first term and the son the second term. (Note: History of Union and Middlesex Counties, New Jersey assigns the two terms to one person.)
Samuel Neville		1758	Royal colonial mayor.
William Kier		1718	Royal colonial mayor.
