= Middlesex College (New Jersey) =

Community college in New Jersey

- Type: Public community college
- Established: 1964
- Academic affiliations: Sea-grant, Space-grant
- President: Mark McCormick
- Students: 13,000
- Location: Edison, New Jersey, United States; 40.506°N 74.366°W
- Campus: Large suburb, 200 acres (80.9371 ha)
- Colors: Green and blue
- Nickname: Colts
- Website: www.middlesexcollege.edu

Middlesex College (formerly Middlesex County College) is a public community college with its main campus in Edison, New Jersey, as well as two urban center campuses: one located in the Civic Square government and theatre district of New Brunswick and one in the city center of Perth Amboy.

== History ==
Middlesex County College was built on a portion of the former Raritan Arsenal, constructed in 1917 for the United States Army, and was closed in 1963. The college was founded by the Middlesex County Board of Elected Freeholders in 1964 to serve the needs of Middlesex County as well as surrounding communities. Frank Chambers was appointed the first president to help design the new college, with the first classes held in September 1966, and 1,500 students enrolled.

Unexploded ordnance was found on campus in 2015 and suspected to be from the former arsenal.

Mark McCormick succeeded Joann LaPerla-Morales as college president in 2019.

The Board of Trustees voted in the fall of 2020 to change the school's name to Middlesex College to reduce perceptions of a "stigma attached to community colleges" and increase enrollment. While student sentiments were mixed, the change took effect January 1, 2021, and included new colors as well as a new mascot.

In 2026, Middlesex's Center for Justice-Impacted Students was awarded a three year, $750,000 grant from the Ascendium Education Group for incarcerated students enrolled in the Liberal Arts degree. A study in the same year found the college generated $594 million for the county.

== Academics ==
The college offers more than 700 courses in 100 degree and certificate programs, with 21 specially designed transfer programs. The college has 206 full-time and 346 part-time faculty. The student-to-faculty ratio is 21:1. Full-time, part-time and online classes are available. Popular transfer colleges and universities include Rutgers University, The College of New Jersey, Columbia University, Kean University, New Jersey Institute of Technology and New York University. Student activities include art exhibitions, athletics, campus radio, clubs and organizations, civic engagement, student newspaper and theatre. There are 85 computer labs with more than 1,750 computers.

Tuition for county residents is $103 per credit hour. Tuition for out of county residents is $206 per credit hour. Federal financial aid is available in the form of Pell grants, work study programs and direct loans. Students must complete their free application for FAFSA. The MCC Foundation offers over 100 scholarships for students attending the college.

Included in the campus is the Academy for Science, Mathematics and Engineering Technologies, as well as a magnet school.

The Academy for Science, Mathematics and Engineering Technologies.

== Sports ==
Men's sports include soccer, basketball, wrestling, baseball, volleyball and track and field. Women's sports include soccer, softball, basketball, volleyball, and track and field. The Physical Education Center has a swimming pool, basketball courts, racquetball courts, and a dance studio. There is a weight training room with treadmills and stairmasters, which are available for students, faculty, and college alumni.

== Child care ==
The college has a child care center for children ages 2–5. Children are provided with breakfast, lunch and an afternoon snack at no additional charge. Classrooms are age-graded, with one qualified teacher and at least one assistant in each room, based on class size. Tuition is based on the child's age, and the number of days attended per week. Applicants for reduced fees must be full-time students, employed full-time, or participating in a job training program.

== Tutoring ==
Middlesex College offers free tutoring services for all currently enrolled students. The Tutoring Center, where a majority of tutoring is provided, is located in the Instructional Resource Center building on the Edison Campus. Tutoring support is offered in multiple subjects including reading, writing, English, and other humanities; natural sciences; mathematics; and business. Appointments are 45 minutes in length, and can be made ahead of time, although the Tutoring Center also welcomes walk-in appointments. Tutoring appointments are available in person and online. Tutoring is available during the fall, winter, spring, and summer semesters. The Tutoring Center also has amenities for students that include desktop computers, access to printers, quiet study rooms, calculators, and study resources like rocks and minerals, bones, and teeth. The Tutoring Center is part of the Library and Tutoring Services Department. Departments at the college also offer their own tutoring for subjects such as ESL and nursing.

== Notable alumni ==
- Quinton Crawford (born 1990), college basketball player and current assistant coach in the NBA
- Joseph Danielsen (born 1965), politician who has represented the 17th Legislative District in the New Jersey General Assembly since 2014
- Dave Meads (born 1964), former MLB relief pitcher who played for the Houston Astros
- Jim Norton (born 1968), comedian, actor and radio personality
- Nancy Pinkin (born 1952), politician who has served in the New Jersey General Assembly since 2014, where she represents the 18th Legislative District
- Danny Pintauro (born 1976), actor from the TV show Who's the Boss, graduated from Middlesex County College
- Vincent Prieto (born 1960), politician, served as the 170th speaker of the New Jersey General Assembly 2014–2018
- Ahmad Khan Rahami (born 1988), suspect in the 2016 New York and New Jersey bombings (did not graduate)
- Tom Scharpling (born 1969), television writer and host of The Best Show radio program
- Robert J. Sexton, producer and director
- James Vallely (born 1954), television producer, and screenwriter; writer and consulting producer for Arrested Development
- Laurence S. Weiss (c. 1919–2003), politician who served in the New Jersey Senate 1978–1992, where he represented the 19th Legislative District
- Lily Yip (born 1963), USA Olympian in table tennis

== See also ==
- List of New Jersey County Colleges
