= Edward J. Patten =

American lawyer and politician (1905–1994)

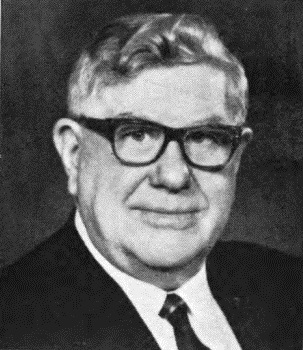

Member of the U.S. House of Representatives from New Jersey's 15th district
- In office January 3, 1963 – January 3, 1981
- Preceded by: Constituency established
- Succeeded by: Bernard J. Dwyer

Secretary of State of New Jersey
- In office 1954–1962
- Governor: Robert B. Meyner
- Preceded by: Lloyd B. Marsh
- Succeeded by: Robert J. Burkhardt

Mayor of Perth Amboy, New Jersey
- In office 1934–1940

Personal details
- Born: Edward James Patten; August 22, 1905 Perth Amboy, New Jersey, U.S.
- Died: September 17, 1994 (aged 89) Perth Amboy, New Jersey, U.S.
- Party: Democratic
- Education: Newark Normal School; Rutgers University (LLB)

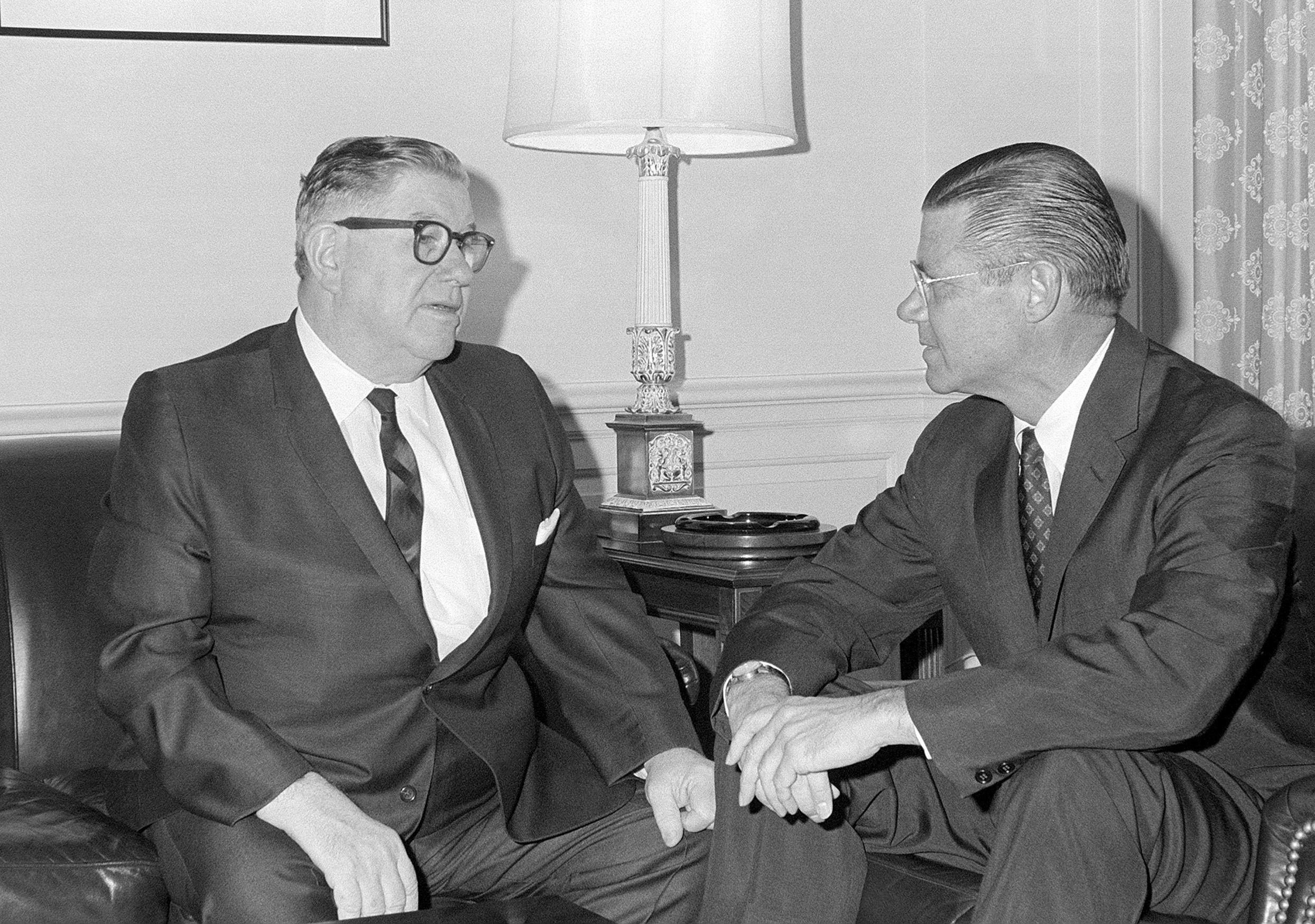
Congressman Patten (left) meeting with Secretary of Defense Robert McNamara, August 1965.

Edward James Patten (August 22, 1905 – September 17, 1994) was an American lawyer and Democratic politician who represented the now-redistricted New Jersey's 15th congressional district in the United States House of Representatives for eighteen years, lasting from 1963 until 1981.

== Early life and education ==
Patten was born and attended public school in Perth Amboy, graduating from Perth Amboy High School. He attended Newark Normal School and graduated in 1927. That year, Patten also graduated from Rutgers Law School, and the following year, he graduated from Rutgers University. He was admitted to the bar in 1927 and began his law practice in Perth Amboy.

== Career ==
Patten worked as a public school teacher in the Elizabeth, New Jersey, school district until 1934. He then ran successfully for Mayor of Perth Amboy, New Jersey, and held that position until 1940. A year into his term as mayor, Patten became director and counsel of the Woodbridge National Bank, a position he would hold for twenty-seven years. After serving as mayor, Patten went on to become the county clerk for Middlesex County for fourteen years, until 1954. He then served as New Jersey's secretary of state until 1962. That year, he won the Democratic primary over George Otlowski and ran for the House of Representatives seat for the new 15th congressional district, which had been created as a result of 1960 census data.

=== Congress ===
The Democratic Patten successfully ran the election, defeating Republican challenger Bernard F. Rodgers by nearly 20,000 votes.

He was then elected into office for the 88th United States Congress on January 3, 1963. Patten was again challenged by Rodgers in 1964, but Patten soundly defeated him again, after receiving 63.2% of the vote. Patten would be challenged and re-elected again in 1966 against C. John Stroumtsos, in 1968 against George W. Luke, in 1970 against Peter P. Garibaldi, in 1972 against Fuller H. Brooks, in 1974 against E. J. Hammesfahr, in 1976 against Charles W. Wiley and Independent Dennis Adams Sr., and finally in 1978 in another election against Charles W. Wiley. He was not a candidate for renomination in the 1980 United States House of Representatives election for the 15th congressional district.

In his time in Congress, Patten sponsored twenty-nine bills, all related to various purposes such as Social Security, human rights, and Medicare. In 1978, Patten was accused of facilitating an illegal campaign contribution from a Korean businessman as part of the Koreagate scandal. Patten was cleared of charges by an 8–0 vote of the House Ethics Committee in October of that year. Patten fared far better than some of his counterparts, such as California representative Richard T. Hanna who was sentenced to six to thirty months in jail, and ended up serving one year in federal prison. In the Democratic primary, he captured 59% of the vote in a race against political newcomer George Spadoro. In the 1978 election, he beat out Republican Charles Wiley by a slim 2,836 vote margin.

=== Later career ===
After politics, he continued to remain active in the various organizations he belonged to, such as the NAACP, Eagles, Elks, Kiwanis, Knights of Columbus, and Moose International.

== Death ==
Patten was a resident of Perth Amboy until his death on September 17, 1994, at the age of 89.

Political offices
Preceded by Lloyd B. Marsh	Secretary of State of New Jersey; 1954–1962	Succeeded by Robert J. Burkhardt
U.S. House of Representatives
Preceded by None	Member of the U.S. House of Representatives from New Jersey's 15th congressional district January 3, 1963 – January 3, 1981	Succeeded by Bernard J. Dwyer
