= Joseph Vas =

American politician (born 1955)

Member of the New Jersey General Assembly from the 19th district
- In office January 8, 2002 – January 12, 2010 Serving with John Wisniewski
- Preceded by: Arline Friscia
- Succeeded by: Craig Coughlin

Mayor of Perth Amboy, New Jersey
- In office 1990 – June 30, 2008
- Preceded by: George Otlowski
- Succeeded by: Wilda Diaz

Personal details
- Born: January 18, 1955 (age 71) Perth Amboy, New Jersey, U.S.
- Party: Democratic
- Spouse: Evelyn Vas (m. 1977)
- Children: 4

Joseph Vas (born January 18, 1955) is an American Democratic Party politician, who has served in the New Jersey General Assembly from 2004 to 2010, where he represented the 19th Legislative District. He did not seek re-election to the assembly in 2009. He also served as Mayor of Perth Amboy, New Jersey from 1990 to 2008. He was defeated for re-election to a 5th full term by local bank vice president Wilda Diaz in 2008 by a 58% to 42% margin. He was elected Perth Amboy Democratic Chairman in 2008, succeeding his longtime campaign chairman Ray Geneske. Vas resigned as the party chairman in 2009. He was convicted of state corruption charges in 2010 and federal corruption charges in 2011.

For nearly two decades, Joe Vas was a major political powerhouse and boss in Perth Amboy and Middlesex County politics. His 2008 upset defeat followed by corruption charges sent a shockwave in New Jersey politics as a one time political boss and powerbroker had fallen.

Vas attended Vanderbilt University and is a founding member (with his brother Ralph) of R&J Associates, an insurance agency. He is a past president of the Perth Amboy Chamber of Commerce.

== Local politics ==
Vas was one of two Hispanic candidates who ran against incumbent George Otlowski in the 1988 mayoral race, with Vas coming in second, losing by 325 votes. Vas served as Mayor of Perth Amboy, beginning in 1990, when he became the first Hispanic elected to serve as the city's mayor. He was re-elected several times, but was defeated for reelection in 2008 by Wilda Diaz. He has also served on the Perth Amboy Planning Board since 1990, on the Perth Amboy Zone Development Corporation since 1994 and the Perth Amboy Redevelopment Agency since 1997.

As Mayor, Vas cleaned up over 1,000 acres (4.0 km^{2}) of brownfield land, cleaned up a carcinogenic spot from the city’s water supply and was involved in the installation of recycled plastics for the city’s waterfront bulkhead.

== Legislative career ==
In the 2003 Democratic primary, incumbent Arline Friscia lost the official endorsement of the Middlesex County Democratic Organization, which went instead to Vas, leading Friscia to switch over to the Republican Party. Vas was elected to the New Jersey General Assembly in 2003; he was re-elected in 2005 and 2007 where he served as chairman of a powerful assembly committee and served as a member of the Assembly Budget Committee. He did not seek re-election in 2009.

In 2006, Vas ran for the U.S. House of Representatives, seeking to fill the New Jersey's 13th congressional district seat Bob Menendez vacated to become a U.S. Senator, but was defeated by Albio Sires in the June 6, 2006, primary, 70% to 30%. Despite the uphill battle, Vas won 77% of the vote in Middlesex County and captured several voting districts in Jersey City, Newark and Bayonne. However, Vas was crushed nearly 8 to 1 in North Hudson, Sires' homebase. Sires allies Silverio Vega, Brian Stack and Nick Sacco delivered massive turnouts in their respective towns of West New York, Union City and North Bergen. Sires has the party lines and support in Hudson, Essex and Union Counties. Sires defeated Vas in Essex County, 63% to 37%, in Union County 66% to 34%, in Bayonne 57% to 43% and in Jersey City 64% to 36%. Vas demolished Sires in Middlesex County, 77% to 23%. However, Sires crushed Vas in North Hudson, winning most towns by 80% of the vote, making the Middlesex results for Vas inconsequential. Sires has the support in the primary of Bayonne Mayor Joe Doria, Jersey City Mayor Jerramiah Healy, Newark political boss Steve Adubato, Carteret Mayor Dan Reiman, Senator Ray Lesniak, Assemblyman and Democratic State Chairman Joe Cryan, Governor Jon Corzine, Senator Bob Menendez, Senator Frank Lautenberg, Assembly Speaker Joe Roberts and former Governor Jim Florio. Vas had the support of Middlesex County Sheriff Joe Spicuzo, Assemblyman Tony Chiappone, Senator Sandra Cunningham, Jersey City Councilman Steven Fulop and Woodbridge Mayor Frank Pelzman.

In May 2008, Vas received just 39% of the vote in the mayoral election, despite outspending his opponent, Wilda Diaz, by nearly 5 to 1.

== Indictments ==
By at least late October 2008, Vas and his entire mayoral administration were under investigation by state and federal law enforcement.

On March 11, 2009, New Jersey Attorney General Anne Milgram announced that a grand jury had indicted Vas on eleven counts, including conspiracy, official misconduct, bid-rigging and tampering with records. Following the indictment, Governor of New Jersey Jon Corzine issued a joint statement with Assembly Speaker Joseph J. Roberts and state Democratic Party Chairman Joseph Cryan demanding that Vas step down from office. The statement cited "serious public corruption charges" related to Vas's use of Perth Amboy funds to pay for thousands of dollars in personal expenses while serving as mayor.

On May 20, 2009, Vas and his longtime top mayoral aide, Melvin Ramos, were indicted by a federal grand jury for six counts of mail fraud, one count of misapplication of funds, two counts of making false statements to the Federal Election Commission, one count of making false statements to federal agents, and one count of making contributions to a federal candidate in the name of others. The indictment charges that Vas bought a 12-unit apartment building on DeKalb Avenue in December 2005 for $660,000, well below its assessed value of $955,000. Five months later Vas allegedly "flipped" the property for $950,000, inducing a contractor to buy it by promising public money – including Regional Contribution Agreement (RCA) funds to help pay for the building’s renovation. He then allegedly instructed city employees to submit a resolution to the council that would provide $360,000 in RCA funds for the property. It was approved in June 2006. Even before COAH approved the payment, Vas allegedly jumped through bureaucratic hoops to make sure the contractor got a $90,000 advance on the funds. On January 11, 2007, according to the indictment, Vas coerced the city’s Assistant Personnel Officer to approve that advance, naming him Acting Business Administrator so he would have the authority to do so.

On May 21, 2009, Vas, Ramos, and others were again indicted by a state grand jury, this time on nineteen counts including official misconduct and conspiracy.

On April 12, 2011, Vas was sentenced in federal court to a six-and-a-half year prison term on his corruption conviction. He began serving his sentence in June 2011 at the Federal Correctional Institution, Elkton in Ohio.

New Jersey General Assembly
Preceded by Arline Friscia	Member of the New Jersey General Assembly from the 19th district January 8, 2002–January 12, 2010; Served alongside: John Wisniewski	Succeeded by Craig Coughlin
Political offices
Preceded by George Otlowski	Mayor of Perth Amboy, New Jersey; 1990–June 30, 2008	Succeeded by Wilda Diaz
