= Jim McGreevey =

Governor of New Jersey from 2002 to 2004

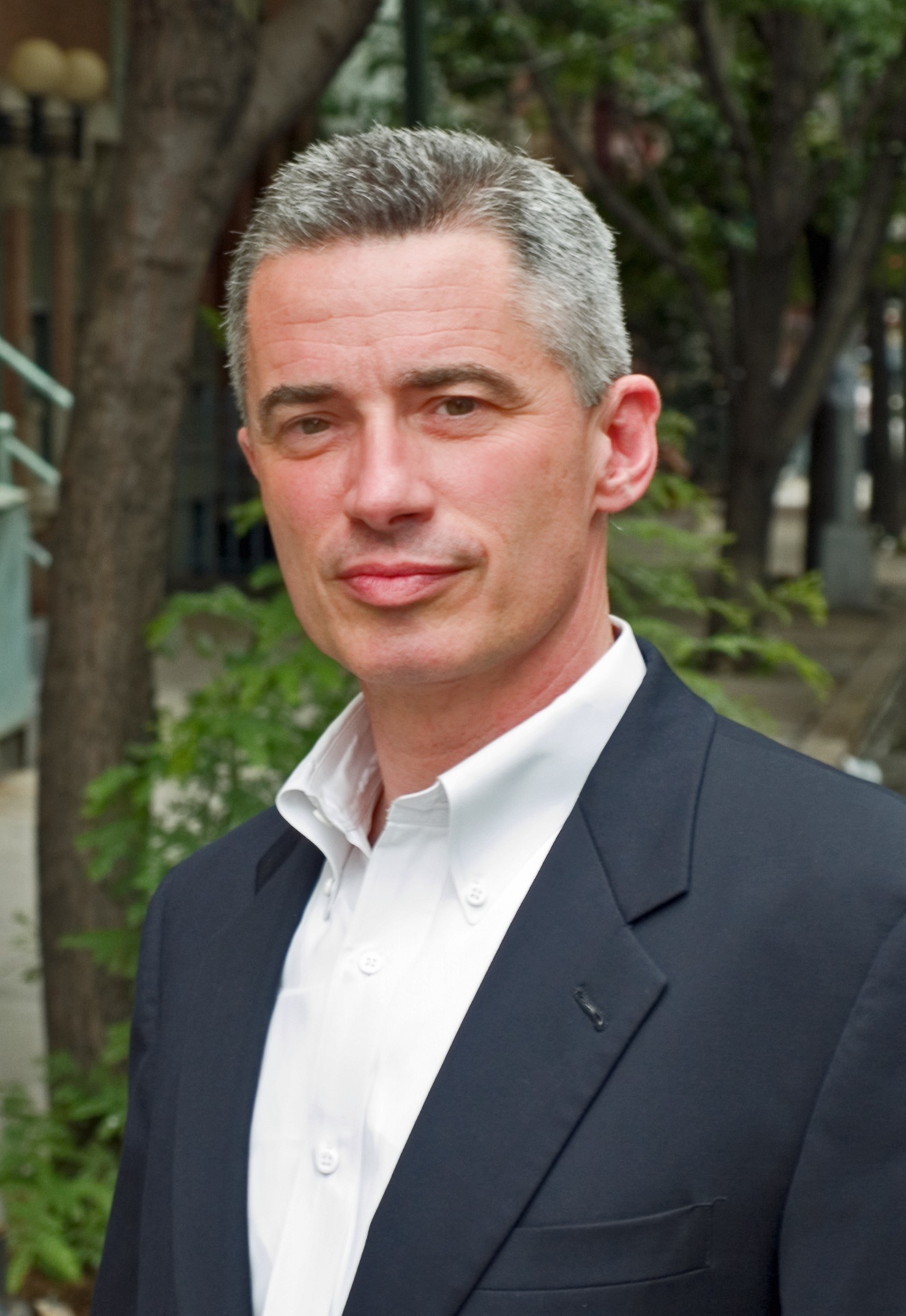
- McGreevey in 2009

52nd Governor of New Jersey
- In office January 15, 2002 – November 15, 2004
- Preceded by: Richard Codey (acting)
- Succeeded by: Richard Codey

19th Mayor of Woodbridge Township
- In office January 1, 1992 – January 15, 2002
- Preceded by: Joseph DeMarino
- Succeeded by: Frank Pelzman

Member of the New Jersey Senate from the 19th district
- In office January 11, 1994 – January 13, 1998
- Preceded by: Randy Corman
- Succeeded by: Joe Vitale

Member of the New Jersey General Assembly from the 19th district
- In office January 9, 1990 – January 14, 1992 Serving with George Otlowski
- Preceded by: Alan Karcher
- Succeeded by: Stephen A. Mikulak; Ernest L. Oros

Personal details
- Born: James Edward McGreevey; August 6, 1957 (age 69) Jersey City, New Jersey, U.S.
- Party: Democratic
- Spouse(s): Kari Schutz (m. 1991; div. 1997) Dina Matos (m. 2000; div. 2008)
- Children: 2
- Education: Catholic University (attended); Columbia University (BA); Georgetown University (JD); Harvard University (MEd); General Theological Seminary (MDiv)
- Website: Campaign website

James Edward McGreevey (born August 6, 1957) is an American politician who served as the 52nd governor of New Jersey from 2002 until his resignation in 2004 amidst a sex scandal. A member of the Democratic Party, he was the first openly gay person to serve as a state governor in the nation's history.

McGreevey served in the New Jersey General Assembly from 1990 to 1992, as the 19th mayor of Woodbridge Township from 1991 to 2002, and in the New Jersey Senate from 1994 to 1998. He was the Democratic nominee for Governor of New Jersey in 1997, but was narrowly defeated by Republican incumbent Christine Todd Whitman. He ran for governor again in 2001 and was elected by a large margin.

During his gubernatorial tenure, McGreevey—who was then married to Dina Matos—appointed Israeli national Golan Cipel as a Homeland Security advisor. The $110,000-per-year appointment was criticized due to Cipel's lack of qualifications, and Cipel later left McGreevey's staff. On August 12, 2004, following threats of a sexual harassment lawsuit from Cipel, McGreevey publicly acknowledged his homosexuality and stated that he had engaged in an extramarital relationship; he also announced that he would resign the governorship effective November 15, 2004. McGreevey later stated that he had an affair with Cipel, but Cipel denied this claim.

In 2006, following his departure from public office, McGreevey published a memoir entitled The Confession. He later pursued ordination in the Episcopal Church and obtained a Master of Divinity (M.Div.) degree from General Theological Seminary in New York City; however, the Episcopal Church declined to ordain him, and he returned to the Catholic Church. In July 2013, McGreevey was appointed head of Jersey City's Employment & Training Program (JCETP). He served in that capacity until his 2019 termination. McGreevey serves as Executive Director of the New Jersey Reentry Corporation. He was a candidate in the 2025 Jersey City mayoral election, losing to James Solomon.

== Early life and education ==
McGreevey was born in Jersey City, the son of Veronica, a nurse, and Jack McGreevey, a Marine drill instructor who served in World War II and the Korean War. His family was Irish Catholic, and he grew up in nearby Carteret. There he attended St. Joseph Elementary School, and St. Joseph High School in Metuchen. He attended The Catholic University of America before graduating from Columbia University in 1978. He earned a Juris Doctor from the Georgetown University Law Center in 1981 and a master's degree in education from Harvard University in 1982.

== Early career ==
McGreevey has worked as an assistant prosecutor and as executive director of the state Parole Board.

McGreevey was a member of the New Jersey General Assembly. He represented New Jersey's 19th legislative district from 1990 to 1992, when he became Mayor of Woodbridge Township, New Jersey. He was re-elected mayor in 1995 and 1999. McGreevey was elected to the New Jersey Senate in 1993, simultaneously serving as mayor of Woodbridge during the four-year Senate term.

== Governor of New Jersey ==
=== Elections ===
McGreevey first ran for governor in 1997, but was defeated in a close race (47% to 46%) by incumbent Republican Christine Todd Whitman. Libertarian candidate Murray Sabrin received slightly over 5% of the vote.

McGreevey ran for the governorship again in 2001 and won with 56% of the vote, making him the first majority-elected governor since James Florio. His Republican opponent in that race was Bret Schundler.

In 2005, David D'Amiano, a key McGreevey fund-raiser, was sentenced to two years in prison. D'Amiano extorted $40,000 from a Middlesex County farmer named Mark Halper, who cooperated with investigators. In the 47-page indictment, there are repeated references to the involvement of "State Official 1," later revealed to be McGreevey. In a conversation with Halper, McGreevey used the word "Machiavelli," the code allegedly arranged by D'Amiano intended to assure the farmer that his $40,000 campaign contribution would get him preferential treatment in a dispute over his land.

=== Tenure ===
After being elected governor, on November 6, 2001, McGreevey inherited a $5 billion budget deficit. During his term, McGreevey raised the tax on cigarettes and increased the state income tax for the wealthy. Raised Catholic but maintaining a pro-choice stance on abortion, he stated as governor that he would not receive Communion at public church services.

Among McGreevey's accomplishments were auto insurance reform, restructuring the Division of Motor Vehicles to the Motor Vehicle Commission, signing the Highlands Water Protection and Planning Act into law, implementing a stem cell research plan for New Jersey, heavily lobbying for the state's first domestic partnership law for same-sex couples and signing such a law in early 2004.

Time described McGreevey's administration as having been "beset by ethical lapses". McGreevey's chief of staff, state police director, and commerce secretary all left their posts due to alleged conflicts of interest.

==== Hiring of Golan Cipel ====
McGreevey met Golan Cipel in Israel during a trip there in 2000. Cipel relocated to the United States to work for McGreevey's 2001 gubernatorial campaign as a liaison to the Jewish community.

In 2002, following his election as governor, McGreevey appointed Cipel as a Homeland Security advisor at a salary of $110,000. Members of the Legislature questioned the appointment, and it was criticized because Cipel was unqualified for the position. In addition, Cipel could not obtain a security clearance from the federal government, as he was Israeli and not a U.S. citizen; therefore, the FBI and the Secret Service would not provide him with intelligence.

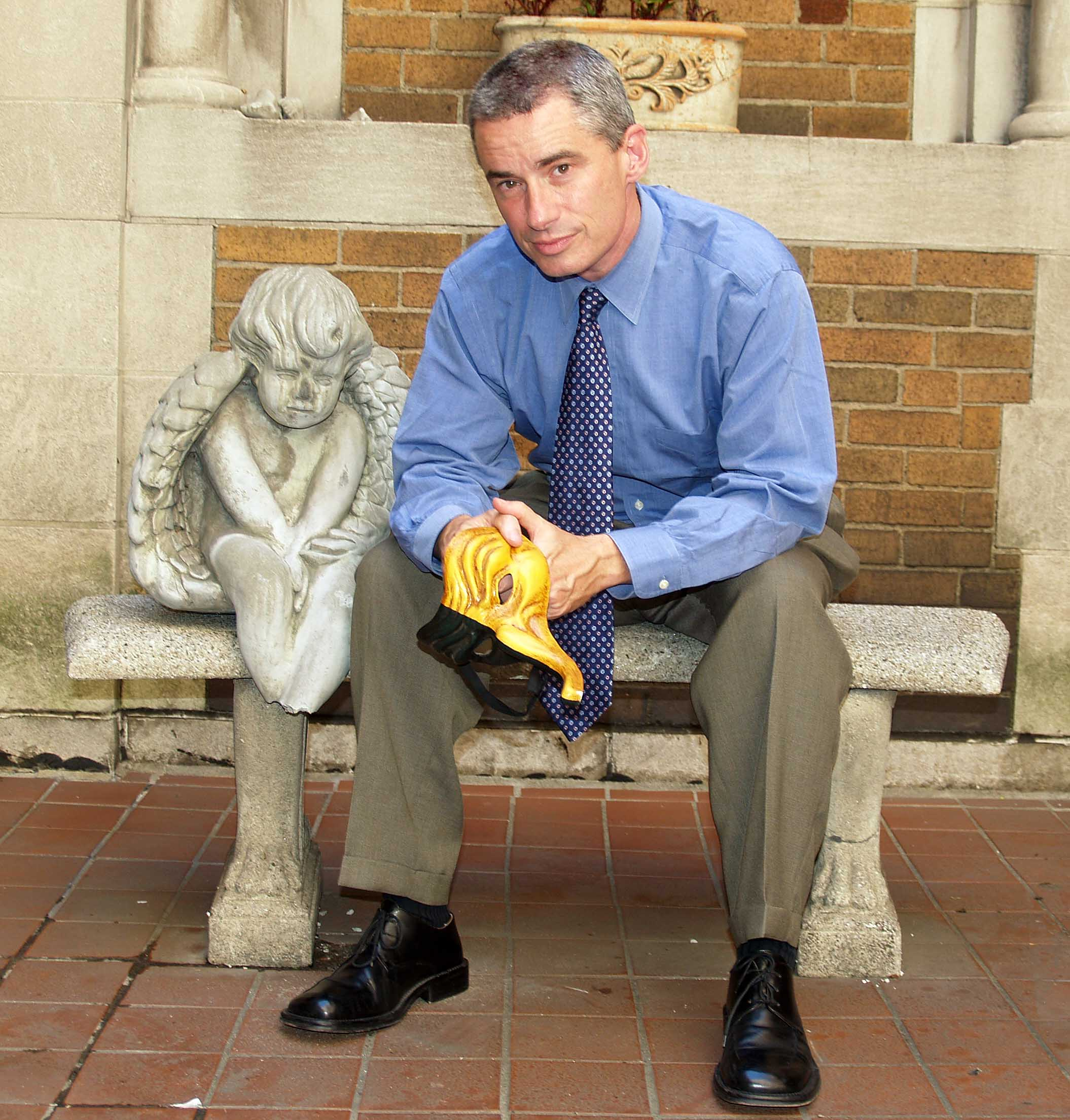
McGreevey in 2007

McGreevey brought up Cipel's name six weeks into his administration in a February 14, 2002, interview with The Record's editorial board at its offices, saying:

We will not skimp on security. We actually brought on a security adviser from the Israel Defense Forces, probably the best in the world.

McGreevey assisted Cipel in obtaining a townhouse near McGreevey's home. Cipel reportedly stated that he needed to live near the governor because his job involved being on call on a 24-hour basis. According to the Star-Ledger newspaper, McGreevey even accompanied Cipel on a final walk-through of the townhouse, which the real estate agent said she found "odd".

Questions about McGreevey's sexual orientation and the nature of his relationship with Cipel were allegedly well-known by political journalists.

In March 2002, Cipel stepped down from his Homeland Security position and was reassigned to an advisor position regarding government operations. In August 2002, Cipel resigned from the McGreevey administration.

Cipel later threatened to file a sexual harassment lawsuit against McGreevey. This threat led to McGreevey's August 2004 resignation from office.

==== Resignation and aftermath ====
On the afternoon of August 12, 2004, faced with threats from Cipel's lawyer, Allen Lowy, that Cipel would file a sexual harassment lawsuit against him in Mercer County Court, McGreevey held a nationally televised press conference. At the press conference, he said: "At a point in every person's life, one has to look deeply into the mirror of one's soul and decide one's unique truth in the world, not as we may want to see it or hope to see it, but as it is. And so my truth is that I am a gay American." He also said that he had "engaged in an adult consensual affair with another man" (whom his aides immediately named as Cipel), and that he would resign effective November 15, 2004. McGreevey's announcement made him the first openly gay state governor in United States history. The Star-Ledger won the 2005 Pulitzer Prize for Breaking News Reporting for its coverage of the McGreevey scandal and resignation.

For his part, Cipel later asserted that he was heterosexual and denied having had an affair with McGreevey; Cipel has contended that McGreevey subjected him to sexual harassment and sexual assault and then fired him when his advances were rejected.

McGreevey's decision to delay the effective date of his resignation until after September 3, 2004, avoided a special election in November to replace him as governor. Doing so allowed the Democratic Party to retain control of the governorship for the rest of the four-year term, until January 2006. It avoided the prospect of a special election in tandem with the presidential election, which could have resulted in a Republican victory and helped George W. Bush capture New Jersey's electoral votes. (Bush did not win New Jersey's electoral votes in the 2004 presidential election. He won 46 percent of the statewide vote, which was more than the 40 percent he had received in the 2000 race but was not enough to defeat Democrat John Kerry in New Jersey. Nevertheless, Bush was re-elected to the White House.)

Almost immediately after McGreevey's announcement, New Jersey Republicans and Democrats alike called upon the governor not to wait until November to resign and instead to do so immediately. An editorial in The New York Times read, "Mr. McGreevey's strategy to delay resignation does not serve New Jersey residents well. The state will be led by an embattled governor mired in personal and legal problems for three months."

On September 15, U.S. District Judge Garrett E. Brown Jr. dismissed Afran v. McGreevey, filed by Green Party lawyers Bruce Afran and Carl J. Mayer, dismissing their claim that the postponement of McGreevey's resignation had left a vacancy, thereby violating New Jersey residents' voting rights. Brown stated that McGreevey "clearly intends to hold office until November 15, 2004. The requirement of holding a special election does not arise. The rights of registered voters are not being violated."

Fellow Democrat and New Jersey Senate President Richard Codey took office upon McGreevey's resignation and served the remainder of the term until January 17, 2006.

In March 2013, McGreevey was accused of “whitewashing” his accusations of sexual assault and harassment. The article, from conservative blog Newsbusters, blamed CBS for allowing him to do it. The article claimed that McGreevey, during an interview with CBS, focused on his own sexuality and skipped over the scandal that led to him leaving office. The article said: "While telling his story, McGreevey skipped over the scandal of his appointment, focusing on his sexuality instead. McGreevey had appointed his lover, Golan Cipel, an Israeli citizen, as the state's counter-terrorism czar in the wake of 9/11, and when pressed, gave him a $110,000-a-year job as an 'adviser.' "

== Post-gubernatorial activities ==
=== Memoir ===
In September 2006, McGreevey published a memoir, written with assistance from David France as ghostwriter. The memoir was titled The Confession. McGreevey appeared on The Oprah Winfrey Show on September 19, 2006, to discuss and promote the book. It was the start of a two-month promotion of his memoir.

In The Confession, McGreevey describes the duality of his life before he came out as gay: "As glorious and meaningful as it would have been to have a loving and sound sexual experience with another man, I knew I'd have to undo my happiness step by step as I began chasing my dream of a public career and the kind of 'acceptable' life that went with it. So, instead, I settled for the detached anonymity of bookstores and rest stops – a compromise, but one that was wholly unfulfilling and morally unsatisfactory." McGreevey also included descriptions of his alleged affair with Cipel. In response, Cipel continued to deny that an affair between the two men occurred.

=== Teaching, divinity studies and community-building ===
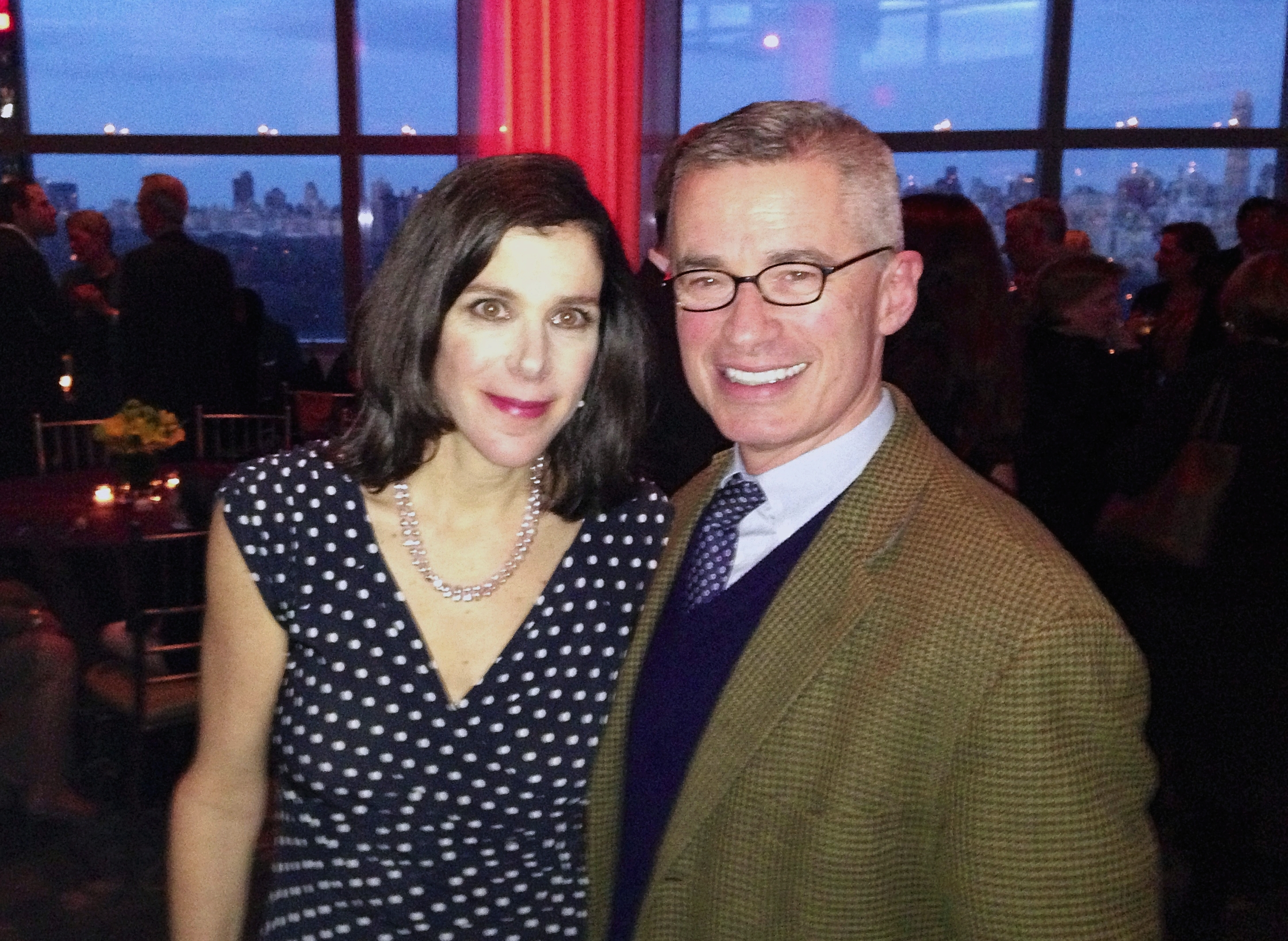
Filmmaker Alexandra Pelosi and McGreevey at the HBO screening of Fall to Grace in March 2013

In November 2006, McGreevey was hired as an executive in residence to teach ethics, law and leadership at Kean University in Union, New Jersey.

After being received into the Episcopal Church in 2007, McGreevey was accepted into General Theological Seminary. He earned the degree of Master of Divinity, a prerequisite to becoming an Episcopal priest. In 2009, McGreevey told The New York Times that he volunteered for Exodus Ministries, where he performed service to former prisoners seeking rehabilitation at the Church of Living Hope in Harlem, New York. On November 16, 2009, WCBS-TV reported that McGreevey was continuing his training at All Saints Episcopal Church in Hoboken. An April 2011 report indicated that McGreevey's bid for ordination had been rejected. He later rejoined the Catholic Church.

McGreevey has worked at Integrity House at the Hudson County Correctional Facility with women inmates with a history of drug use.

McGreevey's life after politics, his pursuit of the priesthood, and his ministry to prison inmates are covered in a 2013 HBO documentary film, Fall to Grace, directed by Alexandra Pelosi.

In July 2013, McGreevey was appointed executive director of Jersey City's Employment & Training Program (JCETP). The program, which provides re-entry coaching for those released from prison, along with other services, such as job opportunities and training, and substance abuse rehabilitation is based at The Hub in the city's Jackson Hill neighborhood. Jersey City Mayor Steven Fulop stated that McGreevey was "a valuable asset" to have in this position.

Among those at the September 2014 opening of the facility called Martin's Place were Brendan Byrne, Tom Kean, Steve Fulop, Chris Christie, Robert Menendez, Nancy Pelosi and Cornell William Brooks. The prisoner re-entry program, funded by the New Jersey Parole Board with a $4.2 million grant, is housed in Sacred Heart Church, also located in the neighborhood.

In January 2019, the board of the JCETP voted to terminate McGreevey's employment. A forensic audit suggested that funds had been inappropriately re-directed to another program, NJ ReEntry. McGreevey claimed that the move was political and asserted that eight independent audits found no wrongdoing.

During the COVID-19 pandemic in New Jersey, McGreevey sought to place early-release prisoners, many of whom were homeless, in makeshift shelters.

McGreevey serves as Executive Director and Chairman of the Board of the New Jersey Reentry Corporation (NJRC).

== 2025 Jersey City mayoral campaign ==
In October 2015, McGreevey moved from Plainfield to Jersey City, sparking rumors that he might run for mayor. In 2023, with mayor Steven Fulop retiring to run for governor, McGreevey's name was floated among potential candidates to succeed him, with the Union City mayor and State Senator Brian P. Stack endorsing his potential bid.

On October 31, 2023, McGreevey filed to run in the 2025 Jersey City mayoral election. On October 20, 2025, his main opponent Jersey City councilman James Solomon asserted that McGreevy took a $35,000 campaign donation from Avery Eisenreich who owns part of the land on which Heights University Hospital (formerly Christ Hospital) occupies.

In the November 4, 2025, general election, McGreevey, along with Solomon, advanced to the December 2, 2025, runoff election, with McGreevey coming in second place in the general election. McGreevey lost the runoff by a wide margin to Solomon.

== Personal life ==
=== Relationships and children ===
McGreevey's first marriage was to Karen Joan Schutz, a Canadian. The two were married from 1991 to 1997, and they have one daughter together. The couple separated in 1995 and later divorced.

McGreevey met Dina Matos in 1996 when he was mayor of Woodbridge Township, New Jersey. The two began dating the following year, shortly after McGreevey lost his first bid for governor of New Jersey. McGreevey and Matos married in 2000. Together, McGreevey and Matos have a daughter, who was born in 2001.

When he resigned from office in 2004, McGreevey asserted that he had engaged in an adulterous affair with another man; he later stated that he had had an affair with Golan Cipel. Cipel has denied that an affair between the two occurred and has claimed that McGreevey engaged in sexual misconduct towards him. Cipel claims he was one of many victims of McGreevey's sexual harassment and was taken advantage of.

Matos and McGreevey separated after he revealed that he is gay. In late 2005, McGreevey and Australian-American executive Mark O'Donnell began a relationship. The two lived in Plainfield, New Jersey.

On March 14, 2007, the Associated Press reported that McGreevey was seeking custody of his younger daughter and filing for child support. Matos demanded $600,000 as well as alimony. On August 8, McGreevey and Matos were divorced. McGreevey received joint custody and was directed to pay child support.

As of late 2023, McGreevey was not involved in a romantic relationship.

=== Religion ===
McGreevey regularly attended Saint Bartholomew's Episcopal Church in New York as well as a local parish in New Jersey with his onetime partner, Mark O'Donnell. McGreevey was received into the Episcopal Church on April 29, 2007. He sought ordination into the Episcopal priesthood, but an April 2011 report indicated that his bid for ordination had been rejected.

McGreevey later rejoined the Catholic Church. As of 2023, he regularly attended Mass at Christ the King Catholic Church in Jersey City.

== See also ==
- List of the first LGBT holders of political offices in the United States

Party political offices
Preceded by James Florio	Democratic nominee for Governor of New Jersey; 1997, 2001	Succeeded by Jon Corzine
Political offices
Preceded by Richard Codey; Acting	Governor of New Jersey; 2002–2004	Succeeded by Richard Codey
U.S. order of precedence (ceremonial)
Preceded by Donald DiFrancesco as Former Governor	Order of precedence of the United States	Succeeded by Chris Christie as Former Governor
