= Craig Coughlin =

American politician (born 1958)

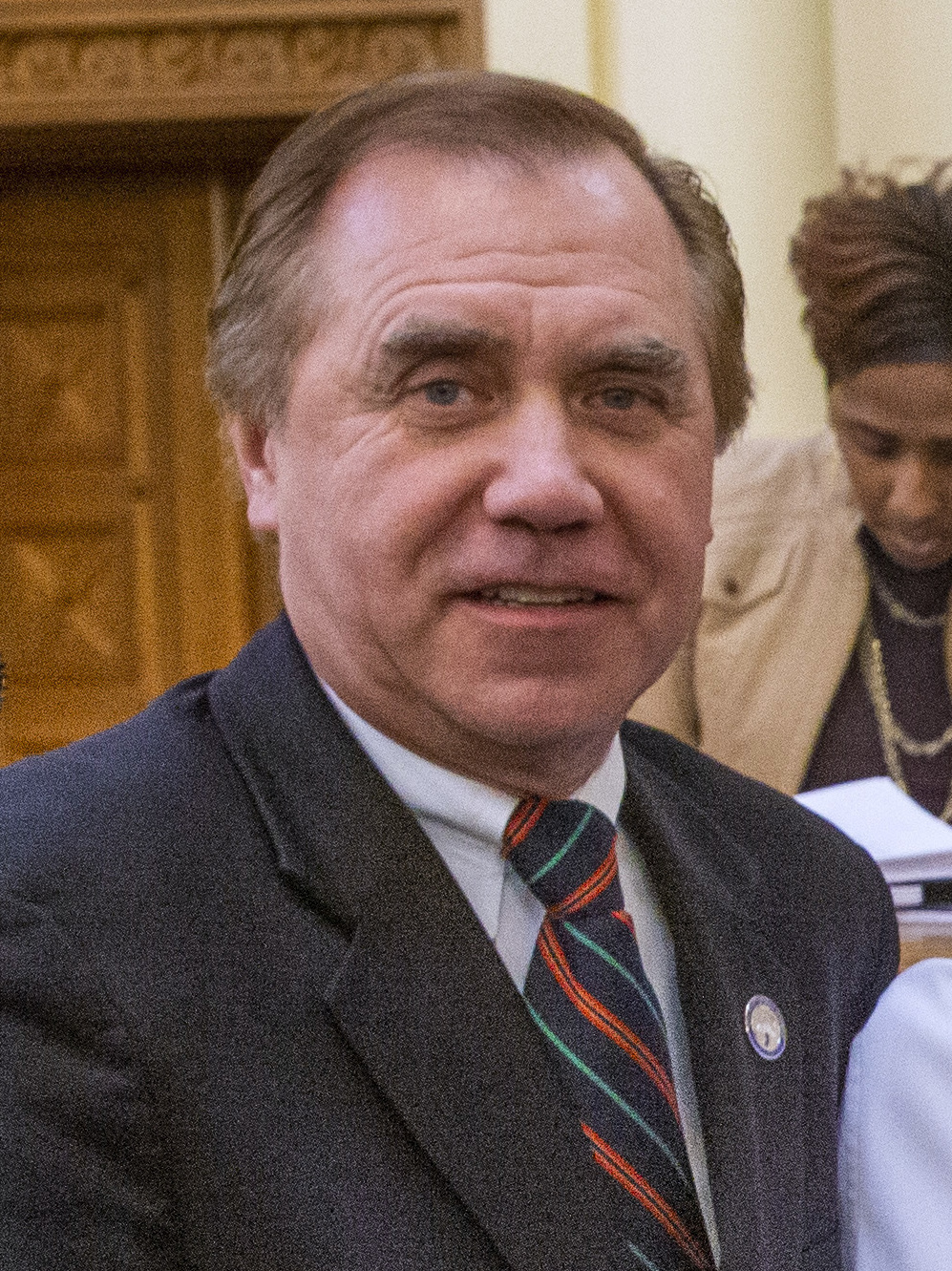

171st Speaker of the New Jersey General Assembly
- Incumbent
- Assumed office January 9, 2018
- Preceded by: Vincent Prieto

Member of the New Jersey General Assembly from the 19th district
- Incumbent
- Assumed office January 12, 2010 Serving with Yvonne Lopez
- Preceded by: Joseph Vas

Personal details
- Born: January 31, 1958 (age 68) Perth Amboy, New Jersey, U.S.
- Party: Democratic
- Spouse: Letitia Coughlin
- Children: 3
- Education: St. John's University (BS, JD)
- Website: Legislative website

Craig John Coughlin (born January 31, 1958) is an American Democratic Party politician, who has represented the 19th Legislative District in the New Jersey General Assembly since 2010. He has served as the Speaker of the New Jersey General Assembly since 2018, making him the longest-serving Speaker in the history of the General Assembly.

== Early life ==
Born in Perth Amboy, New Jersey, Coughlin grew up in South Amboy and graduated from South Amboy Middle High School in 1976. Coughlin received a B.S. degree in 1980 from St. John's University and a J.D. degree in 1983 from St. John's University School of Law.

He served on the Board of Education of the South Amboy Public Schools from 1983 to 1987. In 1987 he was elected to the South Amboy City Council, serving until 1993. He worked as an attorney before serving as a municipal court judge for Edison in 2005. He lived in Woodbridge Township, New Jersey and his children attended the Woodbridge Township School District.

== New Jersey Assembly ==
He resigned from the court in 2009 to run for the General Assembly seat vacated by Joseph Vas, after the Democratic candidate, South Amboy Mayor John O'Leary, dropped out of the race. On September 8, 2009, a special convention of Middlesex County Democratic Committee members selected Coughlin to appear on the general election ballot along with running mate John Wisniewski.

Coughlin won the general election and was sworn into office on January 12, 2010. On November 13, 2017, was selected by the Assembly Democratic Conference to be Speaker of the Assembly starting in January 2018 when the new legislative term begins.

=== District 19 ===
Each of the 40 districts in the New Jersey Legislature has one representative in the New Jersey Senate and two members in the New Jersey General Assembly. The representatives from the 19th District for the 2024—2025 Legislative Session are:

- Senator Joe F. Vitale (D)
- Assemblyman Craig Coughlin (D)
- Assemblywoman Yvonne Lopez (D)

=== Electoral history ===
19th Legislative District General Election, 2023
| Party | Candidate | Votes | % |
|---|---|---|---|
| Democratic | Craig J. Coughlin (incumbent) | 18,808 | 31.4 |
| Democratic | Yvonne Lopez (incumbent) | 18,254 | 30.5 |
| Republican | Marilyn Colon | 11,496 | 19.2 |
| Republican | Sam Raval | 10,740 | 17.9 |
| Libertarian | David Diez | 619 | 1.0 |
| Total votes | | 59,917 | 100.0 |
| Democratic hold | | | |
| Democratic hold | | | |

New Jersey general election, 2021
| Party | Candidate | Votes | % |
|---|---|---|---|
| Democratic | Craig Coughlin (Incumbent) | 26,529 | 29.15 |
| Democratic | Yvonne Lopez (Incumbent) | 26,057 | 28.63 |
| Republican | Anthony "Tony" Gallo | 19,337 | 21.24 |
| Republican | Bruce Banko | 19,098 | 20.98 |
| Total votes | | 91,021 | 100.0 |

19th Legislative District General Election, 2019
| Party | Candidate | Votes | % |
|---|---|---|---|
| Democratic | Craig Coughlin (incumbent) | 17,878 | 33.52% |
| Democratic | Yvonne Lopez (incumbent) | 17,039 | 31.95% |
| Republican | Rocco Genova | 9,046 | 16.96% |
| Republican | Christian Onuoha | 8,705 | 16.32% |
| Independent | William Cruz | 661 | 1.24% |
| Total votes | | 53,329 | 100% |
| Democratic hold | | | |

New Jersey general election, 2017
| Party | Candidate | Votes | % | ±% |
|---|---|---|---|---|
| Democratic | Craig Coughlin (Incumbent) | 25,708 | 35.6 | 0.0 |
| Democratic | Yvonne Lopez | 24,830 | 34.4 | ▼1.9 |
| Republican | Deepak Malhotra | 10,709 | 14.8 | 0.0 |
| Republican | Amarjit K. Riar | 9,436 | 13.1 | ▼0.2 |
| Quality of Life | William Cruz | 1,488 | 2.1 | N/A |
| Total votes | | 72,171 | 100.0 | |

New Jersey general election, 2015
| Party | Candidate | Votes | % | ±% |
|---|---|---|---|---|
| Democratic | John Wisniewski (Incumbent) | 16,159 | 36.3 | ▲2.6 |
| Democratic | Craig Coughlin (Incumbent) | 15,880 | 35.6 | ▲4.7 |
| Republican | Thomas E. Maras | 6,597 | 14.8 | ▼3.7 |
| Republican | Jesus Varela | 5,916 | 13.3 | ▼3.5 |
| Total votes | | '44,552' | '100.0' | |

New Jersey general election, 2013
| Party | Candidate | Votes | % | ±% |
|---|---|---|---|---|
| Democratic | John Wisniewski (Incumbent) | 24,404 | 33.7 | ▼0.3 |
| Democratic | Craig Coughlin (Incumbent) | 22,393 | 30.9 | ▼1.7 |
| Republican | Stephanie Ziemba | 13,406 | 18.5 | ▲1.7 |
| Republican | Arif Khan | 12,151 | 16.8 | ▲0.2 |
| Total votes | | '72,354' | '100.0' | |

New Jersey general election, 2011
| Party | Candidate | Votes | % |
|---|---|---|---|
| Democratic | John Wisniewski (Incumbent) | 18,241 | 34.0 |
| Democratic | Craig Coughlin (Incumbent) | 17,492 | 32.6 |
| Republican | Angel J. Leon | 9,008 | 16.8 |
| Republican | Shane Robinson | 8,915 | 16.6 |
| Total votes | | 53,656 | 100.0 |

New Jersey general election, 2009
| Party | Candidate | Votes | % | ±% |
|---|---|---|---|---|
| Democratic | John Wisniewski (Incumbent) | 24,329 | 28.7 | ▼4.6 |
| Democratic | Craig Coughlin | 22,226 | 26.3 | ▼0.7 |
| Republican | Richard W. Piatkowski | 17,555 | 20.7 | ▲0.5 |
| Republican | Peter Kothari | 16,846 | 19.9 | ▲0.3 |
| Total votes | | '84,633' | '100.0' | |

== Controversy ==
In 2016, shortly after attaining the position of Assembly Speaker, Coughlin formed the law firm Rainone Coughlin Minchello. Coughlin's firm includes four other attorneys who had worked for Decotiis FitzPatrick & Cole LLP, providing legal services to municipal and county governments totaling $14 million in FY2016. As of 2017, Coughlin's firm secured contracts with dozens of local municipalities totaling over $1 million.

Coughlin's law firm currently provides for-profit legal counsel to the Middlesex County Improvement Authority, and in 2020 acquired a $150,000 public contract with North Brunswick to fulfill the position of Municipal Attorney.

The Middlesex County Improvement Authority was awarded a $70 million contract by NJ Transit to manage the North Brunswick train station project. In a statement made to Bloomberg News, Coughlin denied any conflicts of interest or "involvement with respect to Middlesex County’s or the improvement authority’s discussions with the state concerning North Brunswick transit village and never had any intention of performing any work in connection with this project."

New Jersey General Assembly
| Preceded by Joseph Vas | Member of the New Jersey General Assembly from the 19th District; 2010–present Served alongside: John Wisniewski, Yvonne Lopez | Incumbent |
Political offices
| Preceded by Vincent Prieto | Speaker of the New Jersey General Assembly; 2018–present | Incumbent |
