= Ernest L. Oros =

American politician

Ernest L. Oros (died August 21, 2012) was an American Republican Party politician who served two terms in the New Jersey General Assembly, from 1992 to 1996, where he represented the 19th Legislative District, which covers portions of Middlesex County.

== Biography ==
During World War II, Oros served with the United States Marine Corps in the Pacific Theater of Operations with the 2nd Marine Division. After completing his military service, Oros returned to Woodbridge Township, where he operated a tire business.

Oros was elected to the Woodbridge Township Council in 1985. In 1986, he ran unsuccessfully for the Republican nomination to challenge U.S. representative Bernard J. Dwyer.

In 1991, he ran for the General Assembly in what had traditionally been a solidly-Democratic district, as part of a campaign that targeted the Democrats statewide as being responsible for higher taxes. As part of the Republican landslide that year in the New Jersey Legislature in the wake of Governor of New Jersey Jim Florio's $2.8 billion tax increase package, Oros was elected to the Assembly together with running mate Stephen A. Mikulak and Randy Corman in the Senate, defeating incumbent Democrat Thomas J. Deverin and his running mate Jay Ziznewski. Oros was re-elected to the Assembly in 1993, together with Mikulak, though Corman lost his seat in the Senate to Democrat Jim McGreevey.

A bill proposed by Oros in 1994 would put insurance data from the New Jersey Department of Motor vehicles into a database that would be accessible by local police, allowing them to verify that a driver has proper insurance for their vehicle. In March 1995, Oros sponsored a bill that would tack on a $5 surcharge on traffic tickets that would be used to fund the purchase of police cars and other emergency vehicles by local municipalities. Law enforcement groups opposed the bill, saying that it would encourage police to give out tickets.

In the 1995 elections, Oros and Mikulak were unseated by Arline Friscia and John S. Wisniewski, two of the five seats that the Democrats picked up in that cycle.

In 1998, Oros was one of the founders of Woodbridge River Watch, a volunteer organization dedicated to preserving and protecting the waterways and wetlands in the township. Oros was recognized by Woodbridge Township as the winner of the 2009 John J. Fay, Jr. Civic Award, which recognizes an individual who has served in office and has been involved as a volunteer in community activities.
