= New Jersey's 15th congressional district =

Former U.S. House district in New Jersey

- Obsolete district
- Created: 1963
- Eliminated: 1980
- Years active: 1963–1983

New Jersey's 15th congressional district in the House of Representatives was a relatively short-lived district that was created after the 1960 census and eliminated as a result of the redistricting cycle after the 1980 census.

New Jersey had gained a fourteenth seat following the 1930 census, and reached its historic maximum of fifteen in 1963. After the elimination of the 15th, New Jersey was left with 14 seats in the House of Representatives until 1993, when it was reduced to 13 as a result of the 1990 census.

In 1970, the district's borders largely overlapped those of Middlesex County, and a large majority of the county was in the 15th district.

The district was created starting with the 88th United States Congress in 1963, based on redistricting following the 1960 United States census. It was eliminated in 1983 following the 97th United States Congress.

== List of representatives ==
Representative	Party	Years	Cong ress	Note
District established January 3, 1963
Edward J. Patten (Perth Amboy)	Democratic	January 3, 1963 – January 3, 1981	88th 89th 90th 91st 92nd 93rd 94th 95th 96th	Elected in 1962. Re-elected in 1964. Re-elected in 1966. Re-elected in 1968. Re-elected in 1970. Re-elected in 1972. Re-elected in 1974. Re-elected in 1976. Re-elected in 1978. Retired.
Bernard J. Dwyer (Edison)	Democratic	January 3, 1981 – January 3, 1983	97th	Elected in 1980. Redistricted to the 6th district.
District dissolved January 3, 1983
