= New Jersey's 19th legislative district =

American legislative district

- Senator: Joe Vitale (D)
- Assembly members: Craig Coughlin (D); Yvonne Lopez (D)
- Registration: 41.34% Democratic; 18.20% Republican; 39.12% unaffiliated
- Demographics: 38.1% White; 11.0% Black/African American; 0.7% Native American; 17.6% Asian; 0.0% Hawaiian/Pacific Islander; 20.0% Other race; 12.6% Two or more races; 36.7% Hispanic
- Population: 239,157
- Voting-age population: 186,467
- Registered voters: 155,334

New Jersey's 19th legislative district is one of 40 in the New Jersey Legislature. The district includes the Middlesex County municipalities of Carteret, Perth Amboy, Sayreville, South Amboy, and Woodbridge Township.

== Demographic characteristics ==
As of the 2020 United States census, the district had a population of 239,157, of whom 186,467 (78.0%) were of voting age. The racial makeup of the district was 91,092 (38.1%) White, 26,240 (11.0%) African American, 1,555 (0.7%) Native American, 42,125 (17.6%) Asian, 95 (0.0%) Pacific Islander, 47,945 (20.0%) from some other race, and 30,105 (12.6%) from two or more races. Hispanic or Latino of any race were 87,729 (36.7%) of the population.

The district had 155,334 registered voters as of December 1, 2021, of whom 60,854 (39.2%) were registered as unaffiliated, 69,040 (44.4%) were registered as Democrats, 22,878 (14.7%) were registered as Republicans, and 2,562 (1.7%) were registered to other parties.

The district has a higher-than-average percentage of Asian American and Hispanic residents. Registered Democrats outnumber Republicans by a nearly 4 to 1 margin, with Republican registration percentage one of the lowest of any district statewide.

== Political representation ==
For the 2026–2027 session, the 19th legislative district of the New Jersey Legislature is represented in the State Senate by Joe F. Vitale (D, Woodbridge Township) and in the General Assembly by Craig Coughlin (D, Woodbridge Township) and Yvonne Lopez (D, Perth Amboy).

The legislative district is entirely located within New Jersey's 6th congressional district.

== Apportionment history ==
Throughout the history of the 19th district since its creation in 1973 coinciding with the first drawing of the 40-district legislative map, the municipalities that make up the district has been relatively unchanged. In all maps, Perth Amboy, Sayreville, South Amboy, and Woodbridge have been a part of the district. The 1973 version of the district solely included those four municipalities. In the 1981 redistricting, South River was added to the district. Following the 1991 redistricting, South River was removed and Carteret was added. Since the 1991 redistricting, no changes have been made to the boundaries of the district, including after the redistricting in 2001, based on the results of the 2000 United States census and the 2011 redistricting.

In the 1977 Democratic primaries, Laurence S. Weiss defeated incumbent senator John J. Fay Jr., and went on to win election. Alan Karcher chose to run for the Democratic nomination for Governor of New Jersey in 1989, and was replaced in the Assembly by future Governor Jim McGreevey.

Having first been elected to the Assembly in 1973, George Otlowski lost a three-way race for the two Assembly seats in the 1991 primary election. In the statewide Republican landslide in the 1991 general election, Weiss lost his Senate seat to Randy Corman, while in the Assembly Stephen A. Mikulak and Ernest L. Oros defeated Democratic candidates Thomas J. Deverin and Jay Ziznewski, putting Republicans in all three legislative seats in what had been described by The New York Times as a "blue-collar and traditionally rock-solid Democratic district".

In the 1993 race, Jim McGreevey won the Senate seat back for the Democrats over Randy Corman, with Republican incumbents Mikulak and Oros hanging on to their seats in the Assembly. Democrats statewide saw a net gain of three seats in the Assembly in the 1995 elections, with two of the pickups coming in the 19th district where Arline Friscia and John Wisniewski knocked off the Republican incumbents Mikulak and Oros.

McGreevey stepped down from his Senate seat in 1997 to run for Governor of New Jersey and was replaced by Joe Vitale. After McGreevey's narrow loss to Republican Christine Todd Whitman, The Record reported speculation that Vitale would step down from the Senate and McGreevey would be named to the Senate seat, a rumor that McGreevey dismissed.

In the 2003 Democratic primary, Friscia lost the official endorsement of the Middlesex County Democratic Organization, which went instead to Perth Amboy mayor Joseph Vas. Friscia objected to being knocked off the party line, stating that "a history of women being knocked off tickets in Middlesex County" exists as "part of a long sad history of the Democratic Party disenfranchising qualified women". She lost in the June 2003 Democratic primary election to Vas and announced her party switch on August 5, 2003. In a similar situation to what happened with 17th district Assemblywoman Angela L. Perun in 1985, Republicans Frisca and running mate Jeffrey Pino were defeated by Vas and Wisniewski in the 2003 general election.

On September 8, 2009, a special convention of Middlesex County Democratic Committee members selected Craig Coughlin to appear on the general election ballot along with incumbent Wisniewski, and the two Democrats went on to win in the November general election.

== Election history ==
Session	Senate	General Assembly	
1974–1975	John J. Fay Jr. (D)	Alan Karcher (D)	George Otlowski (D)
1976–1977	John J. Fay Jr. (D)	Alan Karcher (D)	George Otlowski (D)
1978–1979	Laurence S. Weiss (D)	Alan Karcher (D)	George Otlowski (D)
1980–1981	Laurence S. Weiss (D)	Alan Karcher (D)	George Otlowski (D)
1982–1983	Laurence S. Weiss (D)	Alan Karcher (D)	George Otlowski (D)
1984–1985	Laurence S. Weiss (D)	Alan Karcher (D)	George Otlowski (D)
1986–1987	Laurence S. Weiss (D)	Alan Karcher (D)	George Otlowski (D)
1988–1989	Laurence S. Weiss (D)	Alan Karcher (D)	George Otlowski (D)
1990–1991	Laurence S. Weiss (D)	Jim McGreevey (D)	George Otlowski (D)
1992–1993	Randy Corman (R)	Stephen A. Mikulak (R)	Ernest L. Oros (R)
1994–1995	Jim McGreevey (D)	Stephen A. Mikulak (R)	Ernest L. Oros (R)
1996–1997	Jim McGreevey (D)	Arline Friscia (D)	John Wisniewski (D)
1998–1999	Joe Vitale (D)	Arline Friscia (D)	John Wisniewski (D)
2000–2001	Joe Vitale (D)	Arline Friscia (D)	John Wisniewski (D)
2002–2003	Joe Vitale (D)	Arline Friscia (D)	John Wisniewski (D)
2002–2003	Joe Vitale (D)	Arline Friscia (R) (Note: Switched parties on August 5, 2003)	John Wisniewski (D)
2004–2005	Joe Vitale (D)	Joseph Vas (D)	John Wisniewski (D)
2006–2007	Joe Vitale (D)	Joseph Vas (D)	John Wisniewski (D)
2008–2009	Joe Vitale (D)	Joseph Vas (D)	John Wisniewski (D)
2010–2011	Joe Vitale (D)	Craig Coughlin (D)	John Wisniewski (D)
2012–2013	Joe Vitale (D)	Craig Coughlin (D)	John Wisniewski (D)
2014–2015	Joe Vitale (D)	Craig Coughlin (D)	John Wisniewski (D)
2016–2017	Joe Vitale (D)	Craig Coughlin (D)	John Wisniewski (D)
2018–2019	Joe Vitale (D)	Craig Coughlin (D)	Yvonne Lopez (D)
2020–2021	Joe Vitale (D)	Craig Coughlin (D)	Yvonne Lopez (D)
2022–2023	Joe Vitale (D)	Craig Coughlin (D)	Yvonne Lopez (D)
2024–2025	Joe Vitale (D)	Craig Coughlin (D)	Yvonne Lopez (D)
2026–2027	Joe Vitale (D)	Craig Coughlin (D)	Yvonne Lopez (D)

== Election results ==
=== Senate ===
2021 New Jersey general election
Party	Candidate	Votes	%	±%
Democratic	Joseph F. Vitale	27,767	59.9	▼40.1
Republican	Pedro "Peter" Pisar	18,585	40.1	N/A
Total votes		46,352	100.0	

New Jersey general election, 2017
Party	Candidate	Votes	%	±%
Democratic	Joseph F. Vitale	27,681	100.0	▲37.4
Total votes		27,681	100.0	

New Jersey general election, 2013
Party	Candidate	Votes	%	±%
Democratic	Joseph F. Vitale	24,126	62.6	▼4.3
Republican	Robert Luban	14,439	37.4	▲4.3
Total votes		38,565	100.0	

2011 New Jersey general election
Party	Candidate	Votes	%
Democratic	Joseph F. Vitale	18,623	66.9
Republican	Paul Lund, Jr.	9,232	33.1
Total votes		27,855	100.0

2007 New Jersey general election
Party	Candidate	Votes	%	±%
Democratic	Joseph F. Vitale	18,864	66.4	▲0.9
Republican	Donald H. Nelsen Jr.	9,557	33.6	▼0.9
Total votes		28,421	100.0	

2003 New Jersey general election
Party	Candidate	Votes	%	±%
Democratic	Joseph F. Vitale	22,643	65.5	▼11.9
Republican	Paul "Daniels" Danielczyk	11,949	34.5	▲11.9
Total votes		34,592	100.0	

2001 New Jersey general election
Party	Candidate	Votes	%
Democratic	Joseph F. Vitale	37,322	77.4
Republican	Naresh G. "Nick" Gidwani	10,928	22.6
Total votes		48,250	100.0

1997 New Jersey general election
Party	Candidate	Votes	%	±%
Democratic	Joseph F. Vitale	32,454	60.2	▲12.6
Republican	Stephen A. Mikulak	21,445	39.8	▼5.3
Total votes		53,899	100.0	

1993 New Jersey general election
Party	Candidate	Votes	%	±%
Democratic	James E. McGreevey	26,721	47.6	▲3.2
Republican	Randy Corman	25,278	45.1	▼10.5
"People's Choice"	Leonard R. Sendelsky	4,092	7.3	N/A
Total votes		56,091	100.0	

1991 New Jersey general election
Party	Candidate	Votes	%
Republican	Randy Corman	25,536	55.6
Democratic	Laurence S. Weiss	20,396	44.4
Total votes		45,932	100.0

1987 New Jersey general election
Party	Candidate	Votes	%	±%
Democratic	Laurence S. Weiss	25,997	58.3	▼0.7
Republican	John G. O’Sullivan	18,570	41.7	▲0.7
Total votes		44,567	100.0	

1983 New Jersey general election
Party	Candidate	Votes	%	±%
Democratic	Laurence S. Weiss	28,251	59.0	▼1.4
Republican	James W. Inman	19,603	41.0	▲1.4
Total votes		47,854	100.0	

1981 New Jersey general election
Party	Candidate	Votes	%
Democratic	Laurence S. Weiss	31,446	60.4
Republican	Edmund S. Kaboski	20,582	39.6
Total votes		52,028	100.0

1977 New Jersey general election
Party	Candidate	Votes	%	±%
Democratic	Laurence S. Weiss	30,474	65.9	▼12.7
Republican	Raymond J. Freid	15,390	33.3	▲11.9
U.S. Labor	Michael R. Leppig	396	0.9	N/A
Total votes		46,260	100.0	

1973 New Jersey general election
Party	Candidate	Votes	%
Democratic	John J. Fay, Jr.	38,496	78.6
Republican	Matthew E. Hawke	10,511	21.4
Total votes		49,007	100.0

=== General Assembly ===
2021 New Jersey general election
Party	Candidate	Votes	%	±%
Democratic	Craig J. Coughlin	26,529	29.1	▼4.5
Democratic	Yvonne Lopez	26,057	28.6	▼3.5
Republican	Anthony "Tony" Gallo	19,337	21.2	▲4.4
Republican	Bruce Banko	19,098	21.0	▲4.8
Total votes		91,021	100.0	

2019 New Jersey general election
Party	Candidate	Votes	%	±%
Democratic	Craig J. Coughlin	18,412	33.6	▼2.0
Democratic	Yvonne M. Lopez	17,577	32.1	▼2.3
Republican	Rocco Genova	9,215	16.8	▲2.0
Republican	Christian Onuoha	8,870	16.2	▲3.1
Independent	William Cruz	688	1.3	▼0.8
Total votes		54,762	100.0	

New Jersey general election, 2017
Party	Candidate	Votes	%	±%
Democratic	Craig J. Coughlin	25,708	35.6	0.0
Democratic	Yvonne Lopez	24,830	34.4	▼1.9
Republican	Deepak Malhotra	10,709	14.8	0.0
Republican	Amarjit K. Riar	9,436	13.1	▼0.2
Quality of Life	William Cruz	1,488	2.1	N/A
Total votes		72,171	100.0	

New Jersey general election, 2015
Party	Candidate	Votes	%	±%
Democratic	John S. Wisniewski	16,159	36.3	▲2.6
Democratic	Craig J. Coughlin	15,880	35.6	▲4.7
Republican	Thomas E. Maras	6,597	14.8	▼3.7
Republican	Jesus Varela	5,916	13.3	▼3.5
Total votes		44,552	100.0	

New Jersey general election, 2013
Party	Candidate	Votes	%	±%
Democratic	John S. Wisniewski	24,404	33.7	▼0.3
Democratic	Craig J. Coughlin	22,393	30.9	▼1.7
Republican	Stephanie Ziemba	13,406	18.5	▲1.7
Republican	Arif Khan	12,151	16.8	▲0.2
Total votes		72,354	100.0	

New Jersey general election, 2011
Party	Candidate	Votes	%
Democratic	John S. Wisniewski	18,241	34.0
Democratic	Craig J. Coughlin	17,492	32.6
Republican	Angel J. Leon	9,008	16.8
Republican	Shane Robinson	8,915	16.6
Total votes		53,656	100.0

New Jersey general election, 2009
Party	Candidate	Votes	%	±%
Democratic	John S. Wisniewski	24,329	28.7	▼4.6
Democratic	Craig J. Coughlin	22,226	26.3	▼0.7
Republican	Richard W. Piatkowski	17,555	20.7	▲0.5
Republican	Peter Kothari	16,846	19.9	▲0.3
Change and Commitment	Barry Adler	2,561	3.0	N/A
Independent Conservative	James C. Poesl	1,116	1.3	N/A
Total votes		84,633	100.0	

New Jersey general election, 2007
Party	Candidate	Votes	%	±%
Democratic	John S. Wisniewski	17,738	33.3	▼1.5
Democratic	Joseph Vas	14,376	27.0	▼4.6
Republican	Paul "Daniels" Danielczyk	10,788	20.2	▲3.4
Republican	Reyes Ortega	10,428	19.6	▲2.9
Total votes		53,330	100.0	

New Jersey general election, 2005
Party	Candidate	Votes	%	±%
Democratic	John S. Wisniewski	28,999	34.8	▲2.5
Democratic	Joseph Vas	26,361	31.6	▲4.6
Republican	David J. Longenhagen	14,018	16.8	▼5.5
Republican	Reyes Ortega	13,952	16.7	▼1.7
Total votes		83,330	100.0	

New Jersey general election, 2003
Party	Candidate	Votes	%	±%
Democratic	John S. Wisniewski	21,613	32.3	▼5.1
Democratic	Joseph Vas	18,101	27.0	▼8.7
Republican	Arline M. Friscia	14,904	22.3	▲8.1 (▼13.4)
Republican	Jeffrey A. Pino	12,312	18.4	▲5.8
Total votes		66,930	100.0	

New Jersey general election, 2001
Party	Candidate	Votes	%
Democratic	John S. Wisniewski	35,090	37.4
Democratic	Arline Friscia	33,458	35.7
Republican	Billy E. Delgado	13,344	14.2
Republican	Christopher F. Struben	11,844	12.6
Total votes		93,736	100.0

New Jersey general election, 1999
Party	Candidate	Votes	%	±%
Democratic	John S. Wisniewski	23,795	39.7	▲5.3
Democratic	Arline M. Friscia	22,092	36.8	▲4.4
Republican	Frank Cottone	7,251	12.1	▼4.7
Republican	William Feingold	6,830	11.4	▼5.1
Total votes		59,968	100.0	

New Jersey general election, 1997
Party	Candidate	Votes	%	±%
Democratic	John S. Wisniewski	36,099	34.4	▲5.5
Democratic	Arline M. Friscia	34,006	32.4	▲5.1
Republican	Kennedy O’Brien	17,605	16.8	▼4.3
Republican	Debbie Bialowarczuk	17,356	16.5	▼2.3
Total votes		105,066	100.0	

New Jersey general election, 1995
Party	Candidate	Votes	%	±%
Democratic	John S. Wisniewski	21,832	28.9	▲4.7
Democratic	Arline M. Friscia	20,671	27.3	▲5.7
Republican	Stephen A. Mikulak	15,948	21.1	▼3.7
Republican	Ernest L. Oros	14,238	18.8	▼5.8
Conservative	Ted Rocca	1,467	1.9	N/A
Conservative	Bob Harsell	1,466	1.9	N/A
Total votes		75,622	100.0	

New Jersey general election, 1993
Party	Candidate	Votes	%	±%
Republican	Stephen A. Mikulak	26,237	24.8	▼3.0
Republican	Ernest L. Oros	26,027	24.6	▼2.2
Democratic	John S. Wisniewski	25,627	24.2	▲1.0
Democratic	Joseph Vas	22,869	21.6	▼0.6
"Peoples Choice"	Marion Lipira	2,569	2.4	N/A
"Peoples Choice"	Theodore T. Moran	2,426	2.3	N/A
Total votes		105,755	100.0	

1991 New Jersey general election
Party	Candidate	Votes	%
Republican	Stephen A. Mikulak	24,761	27.8
Republican	Ernest L. Oros	23,908	26.8
Democratic	Thomas J. Deverin	20,673	23.2
Democratic	Jay Ziznewski	19,774	22.2
Total votes		89,116	100.0

1989 New Jersey general election
Party	Candidate	Votes	%	±%
Democratic	James E. McGreevey	27,726	27.7	▲1.1
Democratic	George J. Otlowski	25,298	25.3	▼2.0
Republican	Randy Corman	23,941	24.0	▲1.4
Republican	Emery Z. Toth	22,957	23.0	▼0.5
Total votes		99,922	100.0	

1987 New Jersey general election
Party	Candidate	Votes	%	±%
Democratic	George J. Otlowski	24,098	27.3	▲0.6
Democratic	Alan J. Karcher	23,467	26.6	▲1.3
Republican	Emery Z. Toth	20,767	23.5	▼0.6
Republican	Beverly A. Samuelson	19,986	22.6	▼1.4
Total votes		88,318	100.0	

1985 New Jersey general election
Party	Candidate	Votes	%	±%
Democratic	George J. Otlowski	26,187	26.7	▼3.3
Democratic	Alan J. Karcher	24,803	25.3	▼2.8
Republican	Emery Z. Toth	23,673	24.1	▲2.8
Republican	Robert De Santis	23,544	24.0	▲3.4
Total votes		98,207	100.0	

New Jersey general election, 1983
Party	Candidate	Votes	%	±%
Democratic	George J. Otlowski	28,258	30.0	▼1.0
Democratic	Alan J. Karcher	26,494	28.1	▼2.0
Republican	Robert A. Mauro	20,119	21.3	▲2.5
Republican	Joseph M. Bodner	19,446	20.6	▲1.9
Total votes		94,317	100.0	

New Jersey general election, 1981
Party	Candidate	Votes	%
Democratic	George J. Otlowski	32,137	31.0
Democratic	Alan J. Karcher	31,115	30.1
Republican	Frank A. Stahl	19,412	18.8
Republican	Philip H. Koester, Sr.	19,332	18.7
Independent	John F. Karloski	1,532	1.5
Total votes		103,528	100.0

New Jersey general election, 1979
Party	Candidate	Votes	%	±%
Democratic	George J. Otlowski	28,911	34.4	▼1.6
Democratic	Alan J. Karcher	27,304	32.4	▼0.3
Republican	Joseph F. Britt	14,442	17.2	▲0.6
Republican	Patrick A. Simonelli	13,486	16.0	▲1.6
Total votes		84,143	100.0	

New Jersey general election, 1977
Party	Candidate	Votes	%	±%
Democratic	George J. Otlowski	33,850	36.0	▲0.6
Democratic	Alan J. Karcher	30,702	32.7	▲0.4
Republican	Joseph F. Britt	15,555	16.6	▲0.7
Republican	Madelyn Lindblad	13,531	14.4	▼0.5
U.S. Labor	Michael Schlanger	347	0.4	▼1.1
Total votes		93,985	100.0	

New Jersey general election, 1975
Party	Candidate	Votes	%	±%
Democratic	George J. Otlowski	29,957	35.4	▼3.9
Democratic	Alan J. Karcher	27,379	32.3	▼3.1
Republican	Joseph F. Britt	13,483	15.9	▲2.4
Republican	John De Noia	12,612	14.9	▲1.7
U.S. Labor	Michael Schlanger	1,274	1.5	N/A
Total votes		84,705	100.0	

New Jersey general election, 1973
Party	Candidate	Votes	%
Democratic	George J. Otlowski	38,496	39.3
Democratic	Alan Karcher	34,647	35.4
Republican	Marianne Brehun	13,237	13.5
Republican	Henry F. Billemeyer	12,892	13.2
American	John N. Dudash	250	0.3
American	Robert Behrens, Jr.	230	0.2
Total votes		97,888	100.0
