= 2017 New Jersey General Assembly election =

- November 7, 2017

All 80 seats in the New Jersey General Assembly 41 seats needed for a majority
- Turnout: 39% (▲17pp)
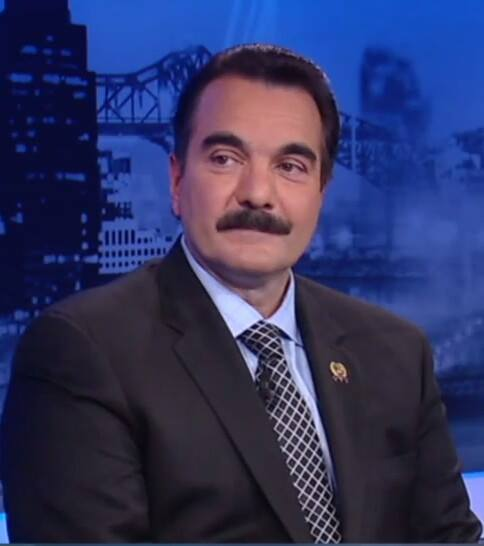

	Majority party	Minority party
Leader	Vincent Prieto (stepped down)	Jon Bramnick
Party	Democratic	Republican
Leader since	January 14, 2014	January 17, 2012
Leader's seat	32nd (Secaucus)	21st (Westfield)
Last election	52	28
Seats won	54	26
Seat change	▲2	▼2
Popular vote	2,266,879	1,613,865
Percentage	58.1%	41.4%
Swing	▲4.8%	▼4.5%
- Results: Democratic hold Democratic gain Republican hold
Speaker before election
Vincent Prieto
Democratic
Elected Speaker
Craig Coughlin
Democratic

The 2017 New Jersey General Assembly elections were held on November 7, 2017, to elect members to all 80 seats of the New Jersey General Assembly. Prior to the elections, Democrats held a 52–28 majority in the lower house. Overall, the Democrats increased their majority by 2 to a super-majority at 54–26, due to holding all their seats as well as picking up open seats in District 2 and District 16.

This tied Democrats for their largest majority since 1979, and marked the first veto-proof majority for either party since 1991 and the first for Democrats since 1979.

== Overall results ==
↓
54	26
Democratic	Republican

Parties	Candidates	Seats				Popular vote		
Parties	Candidates	2015	2017	+/-	Strength	Vote	%	Change
Democratic	80	52	54	▲2	68%	2,266,879	58.1%	▲4.8%
Republican	78	28	26	▼2	33%	1,613,865	41.4%	▼4.5%
Green	4	0	0	Steady	0%	4,828	0.1%	▼0.3%
Libertarian	4	0	0	Steady	0%	2,804	0.1%	0.0%
Solidarity	1	0	0	Steady	0%	821	0.02%	N/A
Independent	14	0	0	Steady	0%	13,537	0.3%	0.0%
Total	181	80	80	0	100.0%	3,902,734	100.0%	-

== Incumbents not seeking re-election ==
=== Democratic ===
- Troy Singleton, District 7 (ran for state senate)
- Blonnie R. Watson, District 29
- John Wisniewski, District 19 (ran for governor)

=== Republican ===
- Chris A. Brown, District 2 (ran for state senate)
- Jack Ciattarelli, District 16 (ran for governor)
- Declan O'Scanlon, District 13 (ran for state senate)
- Gail Phoebus, District 24
- Maria Rodriguez-Gregg, District 8 (withdrew after renomination)
- David C. Russo, District 40

In addition, four members who were elected in the last election in 2015 have since resigned: Patrick J. Diegnan (D-18th), L. Grace Spencer (D-29th), Scott Rumana (R-40th), and Dave Rible (R-30th).

== Summary of results by district ==
Legislative district	2016 Pres.	Incumbent	Party	Elected assembly member	Party
1st	R +8.92	R. Bruce Land	Democrat	R. Bruce Land	Democrat
1st	R +8.92	Bob Andrzejczak	Democrat	Bob Andrzejczak	Democrat
2nd	D+11.44	Vince Mazzeo	Democrat	Vince Mazzeo	Democrat
2nd	D+11.44	Chris A. Brown	Republican	John Armato	Democrat
3rd	R+3.49	John J. Burzichelli	Democrat	John J. Burzichelli	Democrat
3rd	R+3.49	Adam Taliaferro	Democrat	Adam Taliaferro	Democrat
4th	D+12.43	Paul D. Moriarty	Democrat	Paul D. Moriarty	Democrat
4th	D+12.43	Gabriela Mosquera	Democrat	Gabriela Mosquera	Democrat
5th	D+28.97	Arthur Barclay	Democrat	Arthur Barclay	Democrat
5th	D+28.97	Patricia Egan Jones	Democrat	Patricia Egan Jones	Democrat
6th	D+32.33	Louis Greenwald	Democrat	Louis Greenwald	Democrat
6th	D+32.33	Pamela Rosen Lampitt	Democrat	Pamela Rosen Lampitt	Democrat
7th	D+26.61	Herb Conaway	Democrat	Herb Conaway	Democrat
7th	D+26.61	Troy Singleton	Democrat	Carol A. Murphy	Democrat
8th	D+2.34	Maria Rodriguez-Gregg	Republican	Ryan Peters	Republican
8th	D+2.34	Joe Howarth	Republican	Jean Stanfield	Republican
9th	R+28.54	Brian E. Rumpf	Republican	Brian E. Rumpf	Republican
9th	R+28.54	DiAnne Gove	Republican	DiAnne Gove	Republican
10th	R+31.21	Gregory P. McGuckin	Republican	Gregory P. McGuckin	Republican
10th	R+31.21	David W. Wolfe	Republican	David W. Wolfe	Republican
11th	D+6.71	Eric Houghtaling	Democrat	Eric Houghtaling	Democrat
11th	D+6.71	Joann Downey	Democrat	Joann Downey	Democrat
12th	R+17.24	Ronald S. Dancer	Republican	Ronald S. Dancer	Republican
12th	R+17.24	Robert D. Clifton	Republican	Robert D. Clifton	Republican
13th	R+13.48	Declan O'Scanlon	Republican	Serena DiMaso	Republican
13th	R+13.48	Amy Handlin	Republican	Gerard Scharfenberger	Republican
14th	D+11.68	Wayne DeAngelo	Democrat	Wayne DeAngelo	Democrat
14th	D+11.68	Daniel R. Benson	Democrat	Daniel R. Benson	Democrat
15th	D+49.81	Elizabeth Maher Muoio	Democrat	Elizabeth Maher Muoio	Democrat
15th	D+49.81	Reed Gusciora	Democrat	Reed Gusciora	Democrat
16th	D+14.35	Andrew Zwicker	Democrat	Andrew Zwicker	Democrat
16th	D+14.35	Jack Ciattarelli	Republican	Roy Freiman	Democrat
17th	D+44.46	Joseph Danielsen	Democrat	Joseph Danielsen	Democrat
17th	D+44.46	Joseph V. Egan	Democrat	Joseph V. Egan	Democrat
18th	D+20.56	Nancy Pinkin	Democrat	Nancy Pinkin	Democrat
18th	D+20.56	Robert Karabinchak	Democrat	Robert Karabinchak	Democrat
19th	D+21.94	Craig Coughlin	Democrat	Craig Coughlin	Democrat
19th	D+21.94	John Wisniewski	Democrat	Yvonne Lopez	Democrat
20th	D+56.94	Annette Quijano	Democrat	Annette Quijano	Democrat
20th	D+56.94	Jamel Holley	Democrat	Jamel Holley	Democrat
21st	D+9.49	Jon Bramnick	Republican	Jon Bramnick	Republican
21st	D+9.49	Nancy Munoz	Republican	Nancy Munoz	Republican
22nd	D+32.11	James J. Kennedy	Democrat	James J. Kennedy	Democrat
22nd	D+32.11	Gerald Green	Democrat	Gerald Green	Democrat
23rd	R+11.95	Erik Peterson	Republican	Erik Peterson	Republican
23rd	R+11.95	John DiMaio	Republican	John DiMaio	Republican
24th	R+28.14	Parker Space	Republican	Parker Space	Republican
24th	R+28.14	Gail Phoebus	Republican	Hal Wirths	Republican
25th	D+0.21	Tony Bucco	Republican	Tony Bucco	Republican
25th	D+0.21	Michael Patrick Carroll	Republican	Michael Patrick Carroll	Republican
26th	R+9.91	BettyLou DeCroce	Republican	BettyLou DeCroce	Republican
26th	R+9.91	Jay Webber	Republican	Jay Webber	Republican
27th	D+28.36	John F. McKeon	Democrat	John F. McKeon	Democrat
27th	D+28.36	Mila Jasey	Democrat	Mila Jasey	Democrat
28th	D+62.18	Cleopatra Tucker	Democrat	Cleopatra Tucker	Democrat
28th	D+62.18	Ralph R. Caputo	Democrat	Ralph R. Caputo	Democrat
29th	D+69	Eliana Pintor Marin	Democrat	Eliana Pintor Marin	Democrat
29th	D+69	Blonnie R. Watson	Democrat	Shanique Speight	Democrat
30th	R+30.61	Sean T. Kean	Republican	Sean T. Kean	Republican
30th	R+30.61	Ned Thomson	Republican	Ned Thomson	Republican
31st	D+55.84	Angela V. McKnight	Democrat	Angela V. McKnight	Democrat
31st	D+55.84	Nicholas Chiaravalloti	Democrat	Nicholas Chiaravalloti	Democrat
32nd	D+41.08	Angelica M. Jimenez	Democrat	Angelica M. Jimenez	Democrat
32nd	D+41.08	Vincent Prieto	Democrat	Vincent Prieto	Democrat
33rd	D+57.65	Raj Mukherji	Democrat	Raj Mukherji	Democrat
33rd	D+57.65	Annette Chaparro	Democrat	Annette Chaparro	Democrat
34th	D+61.59	Thomas P. Giblin	Democrat	Thomas P. Giblin	Democrat
34th	D+61.59	Sheila Oliver	Democrat	Sheila Oliver	Democrat
35th	D+55.24	Shavonda E. Sumter	Democrat	Shavonda E. Sumter	Democrat
35th	D+55.24	Benjie E. Wimberly	Democrat	Benjie E. Wimberly	Democrat
36th	D+16.29	Gary Schaer	Democrat	Gary Schaer	Democrat
36th	D+16.29	Marlene Caride	Democrat	Marlene Caride	Democrat
37th	D+42.36	Gordon M. Johnson	Democrat	Gordon M. Johnson	Democrat
37th	D+42.36	Valerie Huttle	Democrat	Valerie Huttle	Democrat
38th	D+9.36	Joseph Lagana	Democrat	Joseph Lagana	Democrat
38th	D+9.36	Tim Eustace	Democrat	Tim Eustace	Democrat
39th	R+4.05	Holly Schepisi	Republican	Holly Schepisi	Republican
39th	R+4.05	Robert Auth	Republican	Robert Auth	Republican
40th	R+7.01	Kevin J. Rooney	Republican	Kevin J. Rooney	Republican
40th	R+7.01	David C. Russo	Republican	Christopher DePhillips	Republican

=== Close races ===
Districts where the difference of total votes between the top two parties was under 10%:

1. District 8, 0.8%
2. District 21, 4.2%
3. District 25, 4.6%
4. District 39, 5.8%
5. District 40, 6.1%
6. District 16, 6.4% gain

== List of races ==
Voters in each legislative district elect two members to the New Jersey General Assembly.

== Results by district ==
=== District 1 ===
==== Democratic primary ====
Declared

- Bob Andrzejczak, incumbent assemblyman
- R. Bruce Land, incumbent assemblyman

Results

1st Legislative District Democratic primary
Party	Candidate	Votes	%
Democratic	Bob Andrzejczak	6,163	51.2
Democratic	R. Bruce Land	5,870	48.8
Total votes		12,033	100.0

==== Republican primary ====
All three County Republican Parties in the district (Atlantic, Cape May, Cumberland) initially endorsed McDowell and Sauro for the Assembly seats. However, the Cape May and Cumberland parties pulled their endorsements of McDowell after a video surfaced of him propositioning a woman in a bar, with Cumberland endorsing Campbell instead.

Declared

- Robert Campbell, mayor of Downe
- Brian McDowell, real estate agent and former contestant on The Apprentice
- Jim Sauro, Cumberland County freeholder and nominee for Assembly in 2015

Results

1st Legislative District Republican primary
Party	Candidate	Votes	%
Republican	James R. Sauro	5,843	54.2
Republican	Robert G. Campbell	3,180	29.5
Republican	Brian McDowell	1,750	16.2
Total votes		10,773	100.0

==== General election ====
Polling

Poll source	Date(s) administered	Sample size	Margin of error	Bob Andrzejczak (D)	R. Bruce Land (D)	Jim Sauro (R)	Robert Campbell (R)	Other	Undecided
Stockton University	September 13–18, 2017	430 LV	± 4.7%	32%	26%	19%	18%	<1%	4%

Results

1st Legislative District general election
Party	Candidate	Votes	%	±%
Democratic	Bob Andrzejczak (incumbent)	32,554	31.2	▲3.3
Democratic	R. Bruce Land (incumbent)	30,938	29.7	▲3.3
Republican	James R. Sauro	20,445	19.6	▼3.0
Republican	Robert G. Campbell	20,250	19.4	▼3.8
Total votes		104,187	100.0	
Democratic hold				

=== District 2 ===
Incumbent Republican Assemblyman Chris A. Brown and incumbent Democratic Assemblyman Vince Mazzeo both declared runs for Senate to replace the retiring Jim Whelan. Mazzeo later dropped out of the Senate race on March 15 and instead ran for re-election.

==== Republican primary ====
Declared

- Vince Sera, Brigantine city councilman
- Brenda Taube, former Margate City commissioner

Results

2nd Legislative District Republican primary
Party	Candidate	Votes	%
Republican	Vince Sera	5,551	50.7
Republican	Brenda Taube	5,398	49.3
Total votes		10,949	100.0

==== Democratic primary ====
Declared

- John Armato, Buena Vista Township committeeman
- Jim Carney, former Atlantic County surrogate
- Ernest Coursey, Atlantic County freeholder
- Rizwan Malik, former Atlantic City councilman
- Vince Mazzeo, incumbent assemblyman
- Theresa "Birdie" Watts, attorney

Withdrawn

- Colin Bell, former Atlantic County freeholder and nominee for Assembly in 2015 (running for State Senate)
- Barbara Rheault, former Mullica Township committeewoman (did not submit petitions)

Results

2nd Legislative District Democratic primary
Party	Candidate	Votes	%
Democratic	Vince Mazzeo	7,197	37.5
Democratic	John Armato	5,596	29.1
Democratic	Ernest D. Coursey	3,852	20.0
Democratic	Jim A. Carney	1,278	6.7
Democratic	Theresa D. Watts	925	4.8
Democratic	Rizwan Malik	365	1.9
Total votes		19,213	100.0

==== Independents and third parties ====
Declared

- Heather Gordon (independent), small business owner and author
- Mico Lucide (Green), community activist and organizer

==== General election ====
Polling

Poll source	Date(s) administered	Sample size	Margin of error	Vince Mazzeo (D)	John Armato (D)	Vince Sera (R)	Brenda Taube (R)	Mico Lucide (G)	Heather Gordon (I)	Undecided
Stockton University	October 26 – November 1, 2017	530 LV	± 4.3%	31%	27%	17%	18%	—	—	6%
Stockton University	September 23–28, 2017	521 LV	± 4.3%	34%	25%	17%	16%	2%	2%	3%

Results

2nd Legislative District general election
Party	Candidate	Votes	%	±%
Democratic	Vince Mazzeo (incumbent)	27,601	28.6	▲3.1
Democratic	John Armato	25,683	26.6	▲2.2
Republican	Vince Sera	20,814	21.5	▼5.0
Republican	Brenda Taube	20,611	21.3	▼2.3
Independent, Honest, Reliable	Heather Gordon	1,208	1.3	N/A
Green	Mico Lucide	718	0.7	N/A
Total votes		96,635	100.0	
One Democratic gain from Republican				

=== District 3 ===
==== Democratic primary ====
Declared

- John J. Burzichelli, incumbent assemblyman
- John Kalnas, independent candidate for Assembly in 2015
- Adam Taliaferro, incumbent assemblyman

Results

3rd Legislative District Democratic primary
Party	Candidate	Votes	%
Democratic	Adam Taliaferro	8,523	46.4
Democratic	John Burzichelli	8,401	45.7
Democratic	John Kalnas	1,439	7.8
Total votes		18,363	100.0

==== Republican primary ====
Declared

- Linwood Donelson, Salem County Vocational Technical Schools board member
- Philip Donohue, former teacher

Results

3rd Legislative District Republican primary
Party	Candidate	Votes	%
Republican	Philip J. Donohue	4,268	50.6
Republican	Linwood H. Donelson III	4,162	49.4
Total votes		8,430	100.0

==== Independents and third parties ====
Declared

- Edward Durr (independent)

==== General election ====
Results

3rd Legislative District general election
Party	Candidate	Votes	%	±%
Democratic	John J. Burzichelli (incumbent)	31,853	30.3	▲1.8
Democratic	Adam Taliaferro (incumbent)	30,733	29.2	▲2.1
Republican	Philip J. Donohue	21,758	20.7	▼1.6
Republican	Linwood H. Donelson III	20,181	19.2	▼1.2
One for All	Edward Durr	589	0.6	N/A
Total votes		105,114	100.0	
Democratic hold				

=== District 4 ===
==== Democratic primary ====
Declared

- Paul D. Moriarty, incumbent assemblyman
- Gabriela Mosquera, incumbent assemblywoman

Results

4th Legislative District Democratic primary
Party	Candidate	Votes	%
Democratic	Paul D. Moriarty	11,510	50.5
Democratic	Gabriela M. Mosquera	11,277	49.5
Total votes		22,787	100.0

==== Republican primary ====
Declared

- Patricia Jefferson Kline
- Eduardo J. Maldonado

Results

4th Legislative District Republican primary
Party	Candidate	Votes	%
Republican	Patricia Jefferson Kline	3,793	50.4
Republican	Eduardo J. Maldonado	3,730	49.6
Total votes		7,523	100.0

==== Independents and third parties ====
Declared

- William McCauley Jr. (independent)

==== General election ====
Results

4th Legislative District general election
Party	Candidate	Votes	%	±%
Democratic	Paul D. Moriarty (incumbent)	32,892	32.2	▲1.8
Democratic	Gabriela M. Mosquera (incumbent)	31,800	31.2	▲1.3
Republican	Patricia Jefferson Kline	18,386	18.0	▼2.2
Republican	Eduardo J. Maldonado	17,761	17.4	▼2.0
Represent, Not Rule	William McCauley Jr.	1,194	1.2	N/A
Total votes		102,033	100.0	
Democratic hold				

=== District 5 ===
==== Democratic primary ====
Declared

- Arthur Barclay, incumbent assemblyman
- Patricia Egan Jones, incumbent assemblywoman

Results

5th Legislative District Democratic primary
Party	Candidate	Votes	%
Democratic	Patricia Egan Jones	11,059	51.1
Democratic	Arthur Barclay	10,571	48.9
Total votes		21,630	100.0

==== Republican primary ====
Declared

- Kevin Ehret, nominee for Assembly in 2015
- Teresa L. Gordon

Results

5th Legislative District Republican primary
Party	Candidate	Votes	%
Republican	Teresa L. Gordon	2,597	50.1
Republican	Kevin Ehret	2,582	49.9
Total votes		5,179	100.0

==== General election ====
Results

5th Legislative District general election
Party	Candidate	Votes	%	±%
Democratic	Patricia Egan Jones (incumbent)	29,282	34.6	▲0.6
Democratic	Arthur Barclay (incumbent)	27,544	32.5	▲0.5
Republican	Teresa L. Gordon	14,181	16.8	▼0.9
Republican	Kevin Ehret	13,625	16.1	▼0.2
Total votes		84,632	100.0	
Democratic hold				

=== District 6 ===
==== Democratic primary ====
Declared

- Frederick Dande
- Louis Greenwald, incumbent assemblyman
- Pamela Rosen Lampitt, incumbent assemblywoman

Results

6th Legislative District Democratic primary
Party	Candidate	Votes	%
Democratic	Pamela R. Lampitt	13,746	44.0
Democratic	Louis D. Greenwald	13,282	42.5
Democratic	Frederick Dande	4,216	13.5
Total votes		31,244	100.0

==== Republican primary ====
Declared

- Winston Extavour
- David C. Moy

Results

6th Legislative District Republican primary
Party	Candidate	Votes	%
Republican	David C. Moy	3,891	50.0
Republican	Winston Extavour	3,888	50.0
Total votes		7,779	100.0

==== Independents and third parties ====
Declared

- Monica Sohler (American Solidarity Party)

==== General election ====
Results

6th Legislative District general election
Party	Candidate	Votes	%	±%
Democratic	Louis D. Greenwald (incumbent)	41,767	36.0	▲3.4
Democratic	Pamela R. Lampitt (incumbent)	40,291	34.7	▲3.7
Republican	David C. Moy	16,811	14.5	▼2.5
Republican	Winston Extavour	16,335	14.1	▼2.4
American Solidarity	Monica Sohler	821	0.7	N/A
Total votes		116,025	100.0	
Democratic hold				

=== District 7 ===
Incumbent Democratic Assemblyman Troy Singleton ran for the district's open Senate seat. Fellow incumbent Democrat Herb Conaway contemplated a run for Senate as well, but decided to run for re-election.

==== Democratic primary ====
Declared

- Jennifer Chuang, pediatrician
- Herb Conaway, incumbent assemblyman
- Carol A. Murphy, director of Policy and Communication for Assemblywoman Gabriela Mosquera

Results

7th Legislative District Democratic primary
Party	Candidate	Votes	%
Democratic	Herb Conaway	11,952	44.0
Democratic	Carol Murphy	11,688	43.0
Democratic	Jennifer Hinlu Chuang	3,522	13.0
Total votes		27,162	100.0

==== Republican primary ====
Declared

- Mike Piper
- Octavia Scott

Declined

- Dana Dewedoff, Young Republican and nonprofit president

Results

7th Legislative District Republican primary
Party	Candidate	Votes	%
Republican	Octavia Scott	5,708	50.0
Republican	Mike Piper	5,699	50.0
Total votes		11,407	100.0

Piper was replaced on the ballot for the general election by Beverly Common Councilman Bob Thibault, as selected by local Republican committee members on September 6.

==== General election ====
Results

7th Legislative District general election
Party	Candidate	Votes	%	±%
Democratic	Herb Conaway (incumbent)	39,879	33.1	▲2.5
Democratic	Carol Murphy	38,819	32.3	▲2.4
Republican	Octavia Scott	20,941	17.4	▼1.9
Republican	Robert Thibault	20,726	17.2	▼1.7
Total votes		120,365	100.0	
Democratic hold				

=== District 8 ===
==== Republican primary ====
Declared

- Joe Howarth, incumbent assemblyman
- Maria Rodriguez-Gregg, incumbent assemblywoman

Results

8th Legislative District Republican primary
Party	Candidate	Votes	%
Republican	Joe Howarth	6,507	50.4
Republican	Maria Rodriguez-Gregg	6,400	49.6
Total votes		12,907	100.0

Following the primary, Rodriguez-Gregg announced she was dropping out of the race on August 30. Burlington County Freeholder Ryan Peters was named as a replacement candidate, selected by local Republican committee members on September 6 over Lumberton Mayor Sean Earlen, Burlington County Freeholder Kate Gibbs, and Westampton Deputy Mayor Abe Lopez.

==== Democratic primary ====
Declared

- Maryann Merlino
- Joanne Schwartz, former Burlington County freeholder

Results

8th Legislative District Democratic primary
Party	Candidate	Votes	%
Democratic	Joanne Schwartz	8,534	50.9
Democratic	Maryann Merlino	8,226	49.1
Total votes		16,760	100.0

==== Independents and third parties ====
Declared

- Ryan T. Calhoun (independent)

==== General election ====
Results

8th Legislative District general election
Party	Candidate	Votes	%	±%
Republican	Joe Howarth (incumbent)	28,841	25.1	▼24.8
Republican	Ryan Peters	28,671	25.0	▼25.1
Democratic	Joanne Schwartz	28,321	24.7	N/A
Democratic	Maryann Merlino	28,196	24.6	N/A
No Status Quo	Ryan T. Calhoun	753	0.7	N/A
Total votes		114,782	100.0	
Republican hold				

=== District 9 ===
==== Republican primary ====
Declared

- DiAnne Gove, incumbent assemblywoman
- Brian E. Rumpf, incumbent assemblyman

Results

9th Legislative District Republican primary
Party	Candidate	Votes	%
Republican	Brian E. Rumpf	9,137	50.4
Republican	DiAnne C. Gove	8,990	49.6
Total votes		18,127	100.0

==== Democratic primary ====
Declared

- Jill Dobrowansky, teacher and school administrator
- Ryan Young, communications expert and army veteran

Results

9th Legislative District Democratic primary
Party	Candidate	Votes	%
Democratic	Jill Dobrowansky	6,048	51.3
Democratic	Ryan Young	5,737	48.7
Total votes		11,775	100.0

==== General election ====
Results

9th Legislative District general election
Party	Candidate	Votes	%	±%
Republican	Brian E. Rumpf (incumbent)	40,158	31.9	▼1.5
Republican	DiAnne C. Gove (incumbent)	39,523	31.4	▼1.1
Democratic	Jill Dobrowansky	23,534	18.7	▲1.3
Democratic	Ryan Young	22,721	18.0	▲1.3
Total votes		125,936	100.0	
Republican hold				

=== District 10 ===
==== Republican primary ====
Declared

- Gregory P. McGuckin, incumbent assemblyman
- David W. Wolfe, incumbent assemblyman

Results

10th Legislative District Republican primary
Party	Candidate	Votes	%
Republican	Dave Wolfe	8,833	50.4
Republican	Gregory P. McGuckin	8,684	49.6
Total votes		17,517	100.0

==== Democratic primary ====
Declared

- Raymond Baker, retired pharmacist
- Michael Cooke, attorney and nominee for Ocean County freeholder in 2016

Results

10th Legislative District Democratic primary
Party	Candidate	Votes	%
Democratic	Michael B. Cooke	5,628	50.9
Democratic	Raymond Baker	5,419	49.1
Total votes		11,047	100.0

==== General election ====
Results

10th Legislative District general election
Party	Candidate	Votes	%	±%
Republican	Dave Wolfe (incumbent)	39,265	31.7	▼0.2
Republican	Gregory P. McGuckin (incumbent)	37,896	30.6	▲0.6
Democratic	Michael B. Cooke	23,417	18.9	▼0.9
Democratic	Raymond Baker	23,174	18.7	▲0.2
Total votes		123,752	100.0	
Republican hold				

=== District 11 ===
==== Democratic primary ====
Declared

- Joann Downey, incumbent assemblywoman
- Eric Houghtaling, incumbent assemblyman

Withdrawn

- Aasim Johnson, Rider University student and candidate for Lakewood school board in 2014

Results

11th Legislative District Democratic primary
Party	Candidate	Votes	%
Democratic	Joann Downey	8,889	50.7
Democratic	Eric Houghtaling	8,652	49.3
Total votes		17,541	100.0

==== Republican primary ====
Declared

- Robert Acerra, deputy mayor of Ocean Township (Monmouth)
- Mike Whelan, Red Bank borough councilman

Results

11th Legislative District Republican primary
Party	Candidate	Votes	%
Republican	Robert Acerra	4,949	50.5
Republican	Michael Whelan	4,856	49.5
Total votes		9,805	100.0

==== General election ====
Results

11th Legislative District general election
Party	Candidate	Votes	%	±%
Democratic	Joann Downey (incumbent)	31,347	27.7	▲2.5
Democratic	Eric Houghtaling (incumbent)	31,012	27.4	▲1.8
Republican	Robert Acerra	25,672	22.6	▼2.2
Republican	Michael Whelan	25,320	22.3	▼2.1
Total votes		113,351	100.0	
Democratic hold				

=== District 12 ===
==== Republican primary ====
Declared

- Robert D. Clifton, incumbent assemblyman
- Ronald S. Dancer, incumbent assemblyman
- Alex Robotin, former Chesterfield Township committeeman
- John Franklin Sheard
- Eleanor "Debbie" Walker, Old Bridge Township councilwoman

Results

12th Legislative District Republican primary
Party	Candidate	Votes	%
Republican	Ronald S. Dancer	4,425	31.3
Republican	Robert D. Clifton	4,203	29.8
Republican	Eleanor "Debbie" Walker	2,713	19.2
Republican	Alex Robotin	2,331	16.5
Republican	John Franklin Sheard	446	3.2
Total votes		14,118	100.0

==== Democratic primary ====
Declared

- Gene Davis, former Linden City Councilman
- Nirav Patel, pharmacist

Results

12th Legislative District Democratic primary
Party	Candidate	Votes	%
Democratic	Gene Davis	5,928	51.6
Democratic	Nirav Patel	5,563	48.4
Total votes		11,491	100.0

==== Independents and third parties ====
Declared

- Daniel A. Krause (Libertarian)
- Anthony J. Storrow (Libertarian)

==== General election ====
Results

12th Legislative District general election
Party	Candidate	Votes	%	±%
Republican	Ronald S. Dancer (incumbent)	30,348	29.3	▼0.2
Republican	Robert D. Clifton (incumbent)	29,610	28.5	▲0.5
Democratic	Gene Davis	21,441	20.7	▲0.3
Democratic	Nirav Patel	20,397	19.7	▼0.6
Libertarian	Anthony J. Storrow	1,016	1.0	N/A
Libertarian	Daniel A. Krause	938	0.9	N/A
Total votes		103,750	100.0	
Republican hold				

=== District 13 ===
Incumbent Republican Assembly members Declan O'Scanlon and Amy Handlin both declared for the district's open Senate seat. Handlin dropped out on March 2 and chose to seek re-election instead after being outraised by O'Scanlon.

==== Republican primary ====
Declared

- Serena DiMaso, Monmouth County freeholder
- Amy Handlin, incumbent assemblywoman

Withdrawn

- Bob Marchese, Fair Haven borough councilman
- Gerry Scharfenberger, mayor of Middletown

Results

13th Legislative District Republican primary
Party	Candidate	Votes	%
Republican	Amy Handlin	6,372	51.4
Republican	Serena DiMaso	6,025	48.6
Total votes		12,397	100.0

==== Democratic primary ====
Declared

- Mariel DiDato, activist
- Thomas Giaimo, attorney

Results

13th Legislative District Democratic primary
Party	Candidate	Votes	%
Democratic	Mariel DiDato	7,539	50.1
Democratic	Tom Giaimo	7,495	49.9
Total votes		15,034	100.0

==== Independents and third parties ====
Declared

- Eveline H. Brownstein (Libertarian)

==== General election ====
Results

13th Legislative District general election
Party	Candidate	Votes	%	±%
Republican	Amy Handlin (incumbent)	35,990	28.9	▼1.5
Republican	Serena DiMaso	34,214	27.5	▼1.6
Democratic	Tom Giaimo	27,212	21.9	▲2.1
Democratic	Mariel DiDato	26,640	21.4	▲1.8
Libertarian	Eveline H. Brownstein	458	0.4	N/A
Total votes		124,514	100.0	
Republican hold				

=== District 14 ===
==== Democratic primary ====
Declared

- Daniel R. Benson, incumbent assemblyman
- Wayne DeAngelo, incumbent assemblyman

Results

14th Legislative District Democratic primary
Party	Candidate	Votes	%
Democratic	Wayne P. DeAngelo	10,474	50.7
Democratic	Daniel R. Benson	10,165	49.3
Total votes		20,639	100.0

==== Republican primary ====
Declared

- Kristian Stout, policy analyst and Rutgers University lecturer
- Steven Uccio, nominee for Congress in NJ-12 in 2016 and Libertarian nominee for Assembly in 2013

Results

14th Legislative District Republican primary
Party	Candidate	Votes	%
Republican	Kristian Stout	3,996	50.8
Republican	Steven Uccio	3,872	49.2
Total votes		7,868	100.0

==== General election ====
Results

14th Legislative District general election
Party	Candidate	Votes	%	±%
Democratic	Wayne P. DeAngelo (incumbent)	35,596	30.0	▼0.2
Democratic	Daniel R. Benson (incumbent)	35,088	29.6	▲0.9
Republican	Kristian Stout	24,725	20.9	▲1.3
Republican	Steven Uccio	23,106	19.5	▲0.6
Total votes		118,515	100.0	
Democratic hold				

=== District 15 ===
==== Democratic primary ====
Declared

- Gail Boyle Boyland
- Reed Gusciora, incumbent assemblyman
- Elizabeth Maher Muoio, incumbent assemblywoman

Results

15th Legislative District Democratic primary
Party	Candidate	Votes	%
Democratic	Elizabeth Maher Muoio	12,221	47.8
Democratic	Reed Gusciora	12,199	47.7
Democratic	Gail Boyle Boyland	1,151	4.5
Total votes		25,571	100.0

==== Republican primary ====
Declared

- Emily Rich
- Rimma Yakobovich

Results

15th Legislative District Republican primary
Party	Candidate	Votes	%
Republican	Emily Rich	2,225	50.2
Republican	Rimma Yakobovich	2,209	49.8
Total votes		4,434	100.0

==== General election ====
Results

15th Legislative District general election
Party	Candidate	Votes	%	±%
Democratic	Reed Gusciora (incumbent)	35,481	37.0	▲1.2
Democratic	Elizabeth Maher Muoio (incumbent)	34,937	36.4	▲2.3
Republican	Emily Rich	13,077	13.6	▼1.6
Republican	Rimma Yakobovich	12,428	13.0	▼1.9
Total votes		95,923	100.0	
Democratic hold				

=== District 16 ===
Incumbent Republican Assemblyman Jack Ciattarelli announced a run for governor on October 3, 2016.

==== Republican primary ====
Declared

- Mark Caliguire, Somerset County freeholder
- Donna Simon, former assemblywoman

Results

16th Legislative District Republican primary
Party	Candidate	Votes	%
Republican	Donna M. Simon	8,048	50.4
Republican	Mark Caliguire	7,912	49.6
Total votes		15,960	100.0

==== Democratic primary ====
Declared

- Roy Freiman, former Prudential executive
- Andrew Zwicker, incumbent assemblyman

Declined

- Andrew Koontz, Mercer County freeholder
- Liz Lempert, mayor of Princeton

Results

16th Legislative District Democratic primary
Party	Candidate	Votes	%
Democratic	Andrew Zwicker	10,918	51.3
Democratic	Roy Freiman	10,358	48.7
Total votes		21,276	100.0

==== General election ====
Results

16th Legislative District general election
Party	Candidate	Votes	%	±%
Democratic	Andrew Zwicker (incumbent)	34,233	27.2	▲2.2
Democratic	Roy Freiman	32,714	26.0	▲1.4
Republican	Donna M. Simon	29,674	23.6	▼1.3
Republican	Mark Caliguire	29,041	23.1	▼2.3
Total votes		125,662	100.0	
One Democratic gain from Republican				

=== District 17 ===
==== Democratic primary ====
Declared

- Joseph Danielsen, incumbent assemblyman
- Joseph V. Egan, incumbent assemblyman
- Heather Fenyk, nonprofit director
- Ralph E. Johnson, law enforcement official

Results

17th Legislative District Democratic primary
Party	Candidate	Votes	%
Democratic	Joseph V. Egan	9,605	34.9
Democratic	Joe Danielsen	9,007	32.7
Democratic	Heather M. Fenyk	4,513	16.4
Democratic	Ralph E. Johnson	4,418	16.0
Total votes		27,543	100.0

==== Republican primary ====
Declared

- Robert Quinn, operations director for a data center and disaster recovery firm
- Nadine Wilkins, businesswoman and former special education teacher

Results

17th Legislative District Republican primary
Party	Candidate	Votes	%
Republican	Robert A. Quinn	2,035	51.0
Republican	Nadine Wilkins	1,955	49.0
Total votes		3,990	100.0

==== Independents and third parties ====
Declared

- Michael Habib (independent)

==== General election ====
Results

17th Legislative District general election
Party	Candidate	Votes	%	±%
Democratic	Joseph V. Egan (incumbent)	29,149	36.0	▲2.1
Democratic	Joe Danielsen (incumbent)	28,425	35.1	▲1.2
Republican	Robert A. Quinn	11,317	14.0	▼2.0
Republican	Nadine Wilkins	11,131	13.8	▲0.1
It’s Our Time	Michael Habib	875	1.1	N/A
Total votes		80,897	100.0	
Democratic hold				

=== District 18 ===
==== Democratic primary ====
Declared

- Robert Karabinchak, incumbent assemblyman
- Nancy Pinkin, incumbent assemblywoman

Results

18th Legislative District Democratic primary
Party	Candidate	Votes	%
Democratic	Nancy J. Pinkin	11,339	51.8
Democratic	Robert J. Karabinchak	10,560	48.2
Total votes		21,899	100.0

==== Republican primary ====
Declared

- April Bengivenga
- Lewis Glogower

Withdrawn

- Bryan Li

Results

18th Legislative District Republican primary
Party	Candidate	Votes	%
Republican	April Bengivenga	2,491	50.8
Republican	Lewis Glogower	2,415	49.2
Total votes		4,906	100.0

Following the primary, Glogower was selected as a replacement nominee for the Senate seat. Zhiyu "Jimmy" Hu replaced Glogower on the Assembly ballot for the general election.

==== Independents and third parties ====
Declared

- Sean Stratton (Green), consultant

==== General election ====
Results

18th Legislative District general election
Party	Candidate	Votes	%	±%
Democratic	Nancy J. Pinkin (incumbent)	30,301	32.0	▲0.4
Democratic	Robert J. Karabinchak (incumbent)	29,376	31.0	▼0.9
Republican	April Bengivenga	17,559	18.5	0.0
Republican	Zhiyu "Jimmy" Hu	16,484	17.4	▼0.5
Green	Sean A. Stratton	1,024	1.1	N/A
Total votes		94,744	100.0	
Democratic hold				

=== District 19 ===
Incumbent Democratic Assemblyman John Wisniewski announced a run for governor on November 15, 2016.

==== Democratic primary ====
Declared

- Craig Coughlin, incumbent assemblyman
- Yvonne Lopez, executive director of the Puerto Rican Association for Human Development

Results

19th Legislative District Democratic primary
Party	Candidate	Votes	%
Democratic	Craig J. Coughlin	8,529	51.2
Democratic	Yvonne Lopez	8,129	48.8
Total votes		16,658	100.0

==== Republican primary ====
Declared

- Deepak Malhotra, certified public accountant
- Amarjit K. Riar

Results

19th Legislative District Republican primary
Party	Candidate	Votes	%
Republican	Deepak Malhotra	1,596	52.5
Republican	Amarjit K. Riar	1,443	47.5
Total votes		3,039	100.0

==== Independents and third parties ====
Declared

- William Cruz (independent)

==== General election ====
Results

19th Legislative District general election
Party	Candidate	Votes	%	±%
Democratic	Craig J. Coughlin (incumbent)	25,708	35.6	0.0
Democratic	Yvonne Lopez	24,830	34.4	▼1.9
Republican	Deepak Malhotra	10,709	14.8	0.0
Republican	Amarjit K. Riar	9,436	13.1	▼0.2
Quality of Life	William Cruz	1,488	2.1	N/A
Total votes		72,171	100.0	
Democratic hold				

=== District 20 ===
==== Democratic primary ====
Declared

- Jamel Holley, incumbent assemblyman
- Annette Quijano, incumbent assemblywoman

Withdrawn

- Ieesha Turnage

Results

20th Legislative District Democratic primary
Party	Candidate	Votes	%
Democratic	Jamel C. Holley	9,435	50.2
Democratic	Annette Quijano	9,348	49.8
Total votes		18,783	100.0

==== Republican primary ====
With the removal of Michael Barrett from the ballot, there was only one Republican who filed for the two seats in this district.

Declared

- Joseph G. Aubourg

Withdrawn

- Michael Barrett

Results

20th Legislative District Republican primary
Party	Candidate	Votes	%
Republican	Joseph G. Aubourg	706	98.1
Republican	Personal Choice	14	1.9
Total votes		720	100.0

==== General election ====
Results

20th Legislative District general election
Party	Candidate	Votes	%	±%
Democratic	Annette Quijano (incumbent)	24,221	45.4	▲6.0
Democratic	Jamel C. Holley (incumbent)	23,790	44.6	▲6.8
Republican	Joseph G. Aubourg	5,361	10.0	▼1.7
Total votes		53,372	100.0	
Democratic hold				

=== District 21 ===
==== Republican primary ====
Declared

- Jon Bramnick, incumbent assemblyman
- Nancy Munoz, incumbent assemblywoman

Results

21st Legislative District Republican primary
Party	Candidate	Votes	%
Republican	Jon Bramnick	7,462	50.4
Republican	Nancy F. Munoz	7,348	49.6
Total votes		14,810	100.0

==== Democratic primary ====
Declared

- David Barnett, former mayor of Springfield Township (Union) and nominee for Assembly in 2015
- Lacey Rzeszowski, activist

Results

21st Legislative District Democratic primary
Party	Candidate	Votes	%
Democratic	Lacey Rzeszowski	9,549	50.1
Democratic	David Barnett	9,520	49.9
Total votes		19,069	100.0

Following the primary, Barnett dropped out, citing work commitments. Bruce Bergen, Union County freeholder chairman and nominee for Assembly in 2005, 2007, 2009, and 2011, was selected by local Democratic committee members as a replacement candidate on August 14.

==== General election ====
Results

21st Legislative District general election
Party	Candidate	Votes	%	±%
Republican	Jon Bramnick (incumbent)	35,283	26.4	▼3.5
Republican	Nancy F. Munoz (incumbent)	34,273	25.7	▼3.8
Democratic	Lacey Rzeszowski	32,719	24.5	▲3.9
Democratic	Bruce H. Bergen	31,248	23.4	▲3.4
Total votes		133,523	100.0	
Republican hold				

=== District 22 ===
==== Democratic primary ====
Declared

- Paul M. Alirangues
- Jerry Green, incumbent assemblyman
- James J. Kennedy, incumbent assemblyman

Results

22nd Legislative District Democratic primary
Party	Candidate	Votes	%
Democratic	James J. Kennedy	10,922	46.5
Democratic	Gerald "Jerry" Green	10,495	44.7
Democratic	Paul M. Alirangues	2,053	8.7
Total votes		23,470	100.0

==== Republican primary ====
Declared

- Richard S. Fortunato
- John Quattrocchi

Results

22nd Legislative District Republican primary
Party	Candidate	Votes	%
Republican	Richard S. Fortunato	2,333	50.8
Republican	John Quattrocchi	2,262	49.2
Total votes		4,595	100.0

==== Independents and third parties ====
Declared

- Onel Martinez (independent), Kean University student
- Sumantha Prasad (independent)

==== General election ====
Results

22nd Legislative District general election
Party	Candidate	Votes	%	±%
Democratic	James J. Kennedy (incumbent)	27,763	32.6	▲2.1
Democratic	Gerald "Jerry" Green (incumbent)	27,284	32.1	▲2.4
Republican	Richard S. Fortunato	14,631	17.2	▼3.2
Republican	John Quattrocchi	13,682	16.1	▼3.3
Remember Those Forgotten	Onel Martinez	942	1.1	N/A
Pushing Us Forward	Sumantha Prasad	818	1.0	N/A
Total votes		85,120	100.0	
Democratic hold				

=== District 23 ===
==== Republican primary ====
Declared

- John DiMaio, incumbent assemblyman
- Erik Peterson, incumbent assemblyman

Results

23rd Legislative District Republican primary
Party	Candidate	Votes	%
Republican	John DiMaio	10,353	50.4
Republican	Erik Peterson	10,177	49.6
Total votes		20,530	100.0

==== Democratic primary ====
Declared

- Isaac Hadzovic
- Laura Shaw

Results

23rd Legislative District Democratic primary
Party	Candidate	Votes	%
Democratic	Laura Shaw	7,706	51.9
Democratic	Isaac Hadzovic	7,147	48.1
Total votes		14,853	100.0

Following the primary, Hadzovic was ruled ineligible to run in the district due to residency requirements. Charles Boddy was selected as a replacement candidate.

==== Independents and third parties ====
Declared

- Michael Estrada (independent)
- Tyler J. Gran (independent)

==== General election ====
Results

23rd Legislative District general election
Party	Candidate	Votes	%	±%
Republican	John DiMaio (incumbent)	33,880	29.4	▼3.0
Republican	Erik Peterson (incumbent)	32,233	27.9	▼3.4
Democratic	Laura Shaw	24,386	21.1	▲2.7
Democratic	Charles Boddy	21,690	18.8	▲0.9
End the Corruption	Tyler J. Gran	1,921	1.7	N/A
We Define Tomorrow	Michael Estrada	1,256	1.1	N/A
Total votes		115,366	100.0	
Republican hold				

=== District 24 ===
In February, incumbent Republican Assemblywoman Gail Phoebus declined to run for a second term and announced a primary challenge to Steve Oroho, reportedly due to disagreements with Oroho over an increase to the gas tax. On March 28, Phoebus dropped her challenge and announced that she would not run for re-election either.

==== Republican primary ====
Declared

- David Atwood
- Nathan Orr, candidate for Assembly in 2015
- Parker Space, incumbent assemblyman
- Harold J. Wirths, former commissioner of the New Jersey Department of Labor and Workforce Development

Withdrawn

- Mark Quick, former U.S. Marine and independent candidate for Congress in NJ-5 in 2010 and 2014 (petitions rejected)
- David Scapicchio, former Morris County freeholder (running for freeholder)

Results

24th Legislative District Republican primary
Party	Candidate	Votes	%
Republican	F. Parker Space	11,149	40.2
Republican	Harold J. Wirths	9,842	35.5
Republican	Nathan Orr	3,787	13.6
Republican	David Atwood	2,983	10.7
Total votes		27,761	100.0

==== Democratic primary ====
Declared

- Kate Matteson, paralegal
- Michael Thomas Pirog
- Gina Trish, adjunct professor at Centenary University, design professional, and nominee for Blairstown Township Committee in 2012

Withdrawn

- Sean Clarkin, real estate agent

Results

24th Legislative District Democratic primary
Party	Candidate	Votes	%
Democratic	Kate Matteson	5,997	46.5
Democratic	Gina Trish	5,414	42.0
Democratic	Michael Thomas Pirog	1,489	11.5
Total votes		12,900	100.0

==== Independents and third parties ====
Declared

- Kenneth Collins (Green)

- Collins announced on June 3 that he was dropping out of the race. However, his name still remained on the ballot.

- Aaron Hyndman (Green), co-chair of the Green Party of New Jersey

Declined

- Mark Quick (independent), former U.S. Marine and independent candidate for Congress in NJ-5 in 2010 and 2014

==== General election ====
Results

24th Legislative District general election
Party	Candidate	Votes	%	±%
Republican	F. Parker Space (incumbent)	33,873'	30.7	▼4.3
Republican	Harold J. Wirths	30,820	27.9	▼5.4
Democratic	Kate Matteson	22,456	20.3	▲6.4
Democratic	Gina Trish	20,200	18.3	▲4.8
Green	Aaron Hyndman	1,568	1.4	N/A
Green	Kenny Collins	1,518	1.4	▼2.9
Total votes		110,435	100.0	
Republican hold				

=== District 25 ===
==== Republican primary ====
Declared

- Tony Bucco, incumbent assemblyman
- Michael Patrick Carroll, incumbent assemblyman

Results

25th Legislative District Republican primary
Party	Candidate	Votes	%
Republican	Anthony M. Bucco	8,954	51.2
Republican	Michael Patrick Carroll	8,546	48.8
Total votes		17,500	100.0

==== Democratic primary ====
Declared

- Richard Corcoran, forensic accountant and nominee for Assembly in 2015
- Tom Moran, retired IT professional and nominee for Assembly in 2015

Results

25th Legislative District Democratic primary
Party	Candidate	Votes	%
Democratic	Thomas Moran	8,522	50.7
Democratic	Richard Corcoran	8,299	49.3
Total votes		16,821	100.0

==== General election ====
Results

25th Legislative District general election
Party	Candidate	Votes	%	±%
Republican	Michael Patrick Carroll (incumbent)	30,323	26.2	▼2.0
Republican	Anthony M. Bucco (incumbent)	30,278	26.1	▼3.4
Democratic	Thomas Moran	27,848	24.0	▲3.2
Democratic	Richard Corcoran	27,386	23.6	▲2.0
Total votes		115,835	100.0	
Republican hold				

=== District 26 ===
==== Republican primary ====
Declared

- John Cesaro, Morris County deputy freeholder director
- BettyLou DeCroce, incumbent assemblywoman
- Hank Lyon, Morris County freeholder
- Jay Webber, incumbent assemblyman

Results

26th Legislative District Republican primary
Party	Candidate	Votes	%
Republican	Jay Webber	8,574	33.0
Republican	BettyLou DeCroce	7,239	27.8
Republican	William "Hank" Lyon	5,350	20.6
Republican	John Cesaro	4,856	18.7
Total votes		26,019	100.0

==== Democratic primary ====
Declared

- William Edge, former Verona and Caldwell councilman
- Laura Fortgang, life coach and author
- Joseph Raich, limousine driver and nominee for Assembly in 2001, 2011, 2012, and 2013

Results

26th Legislative District Democratic primary
Party	Candidate	Votes	%
Democratic	E. William Edge	6,669	42.9
Democratic	Joseph R. Raich	6,054	38.9
Democratic	Laura Fortgang	2,835	18.2
Total votes		15,558	100.0

==== General election ====
Results

26th Legislative District general election
Party	Candidate	Votes	%	±%
Republican	Jay Webber (incumbent)	31,810	28.2	▼2.1
Republican	BettyLou DeCroce (incumbent)	31,766	28.2	▼1.9
Democratic	Joseph R. Raich	24,732	22.0	▲2.6
Democratic	E. William Edge	24,362	21.6	▲2.8
Total votes		112,670	100.0	
Republican hold				

=== District 27 ===
==== Democratic primary ====
Declared

- Mila Jasey, incumbent assemblywoman
- John F. McKeon, incumbent assemblyman

Results

27th Legislative District Democratic primary
Party	Candidate	Votes	%
Democratic	John F. McKeon	14,493	50.4
Democratic	Mila M. Jasey	14,241	49.6
Total votes		28,734	100.0

==== Republican primary ====
Declared

- Ronald DeRose, member of the Florham Park Zoning Board of Adjustment
- Angelo Tedesco Jr., former East Hanover Township councilman

Results

27th Legislative District Republican primary
Party	Candidate	Votes	%
Republican	Angelo Tedesco Jr.	5,058	50.3
Republican	Ronald DeRose	5,002	49.7
Total votes		10,060	100.0

==== General election ====
Results

27th Legislative District general election
Party	Candidate	Votes	%	±%
Democratic	John F. McKeon (incumbent)	39,742	33.4	▲4.0
Democratic	Mila M. Jasey (incumbent)	38,311	32.2	▲4.6
Republican	Ronald DeRose	20,625	17.3	▼4.0
Republican	Angelo Tedesco Jr.	20,451	17.2	▼2.7
Total votes		119,129	100.0	
Democratic hold				

=== District 28 ===
==== Democratic primary ====
Declared

- Ralph R. Caputo, incumbent assemblyman
- Cleopatra Tucker, incumbent assemblywoman

Results

28th Legislative District Democratic primary
Party	Candidate	Votes	%
Democratic	Cleopatra G. Tucker	11,229	51.8
Democratic	Ralph R. Caputo	10,433	48.2
Total votes		21,662	100.0

==== Republican primary ====
Declared

- James Boydston
- Veronica Branch

Results

28th Legislative District Republican primary
Party	Candidate	Votes	%
Republican	James Boydston	865	50.1
Republican	Veronica Branch	860	49.9
Total votes		1,725	100.0

==== Independents and third parties ====
Declared

- Joanne Miller (independent)
- Scott Thomas Nicastro Jr. (independent)

==== General election ====
Results

28th Legislative District general election
Party	Candidate	Votes	%	±%
Democratic	Ralph R. Caputo (incumbent)	30,084	42.7	▼0.5
Democratic	Cleopatra G. Tucker (incumbent)	29,643	42.1	▲0.4
Republican	Veronica Branch	4,839	6.9	▼0.6
Republican	James Boydston	4,672	6.6	▼0.9
Time for Change	Joanne Miller	782	1.1	N/A
A New Hope	Scott Thomas Nicastro Jr.	430	0.6	N/A
Total votes		70,450	100.0	
Democratic hold				

=== District 29 ===
Incumbent Democratic Assemblywoman Blonnie R. Watson did not run for a full term.

==== Democratic primary ====
Declared

- Eliana Pintor Marin, incumbent assemblywoman
- Shanique Speight, Essex County sheriff's officer and former Newark school board member

Withdrawn

- Tai Cooper, policy advisor to Newark Mayor Ras J. Baraka
- Pat Council, Newark Director of Recreation, Cultural Affairs, and Senior Services
- Safanya Searcy, labor organizer and party strategist

Results

29th Legislative District Democratic primary
Party	Candidate	Votes	%
Democratic	Eliana Pintor Marin	7,174	50.6
Democratic	Shanique Speight	7,007	49.4
Total votes		14,181	100.0

==== Republican primary ====
Declared

- Charles G. Hood
- Jeanette Veras, nominee for Assembly in 2015

Results

29th Legislative District Republican primary
Party	Candidate	Votes	%
Republican	Charles G. Hood	499	50.7
Republican	Jeanette Veras	486	49.3
Total votes		985	100.0

==== General election ====
Results

29th Legislative District general election
Party	Candidate	Votes	%	±%
Democratic	Eliana Pintor Marin (incumbent)	19,088	44.8	▲5.6
Democratic	Shanique Speight	18,308	43.0	▲0.1
Republican	Charles G. Hood	2,622	6.2	▼2.3
Republican	Jeannette Veras	2,574	6.0	▼0.5
Total votes		42,592	100.0	
Democratic hold				

=== District 30 ===
==== Republican primary ====
Declared

- Sean T. Kean, incumbent assemblyman
- Dave Rible, incumbent assemblyman

Results

30th Legislative District Republican primary
Party	Candidate	Votes	%
Republican	Sean T. Kean	9,269	51.0
Republican	David P. Rible	8,916	49.0
Total votes		18,185	100.0

Following the primary, Rible was nominated director of the New Jersey Division of Alcoholic Beverage Control by Governor Chris Christie. Rible resigned his Assembly seat on July 17 to accept the position. A special convention was held on August 15, where local Republican committee members selected a candidate to serve the remaining months of Rible's term in addition to replacing him on the ballot. Three Republicans were running: former Belmar Borough Councilman James Bean, chairman of the Lakewood Republican Party Justin Flancbaum, and former mayor of Wall Ned Thomson. Wall school board member Ralph Addonizio and Monmouth County Freeholder Gary Rich also declared runs but later dropped out. Thomson was selected as the replacement, receiving 83 votes to Flancbaum's 53 and Bean's 18, and was sworn into the Assembly on August 24.

==== Democratic primary ====
Declared

- Eliot Colon, businessman
- Kevin Scott, manager of a Chipotle restaurant

Results

30th Legislative District Democratic primary
Party	Candidate	Votes	%
Democratic	Kevin Scott	4,957	50.7
Democratic	Eliot Arlo Colon	4,820	49.3
Total votes		9,777	100.0

==== General election ====
Results

30th Legislative District general election
Party	Candidate	Votes	%	±%
Republican	Sean T. Kean (incumbent)	33,672	33.3	▼1.2
Republican	Edward H. Thomson III (incumbent)	30,680	30.3	▼3.6
Democratic	Kevin Scott	18,737	18.5	▲2.6
Democratic	Eliot Arlo Colon	18,160	17.9	▲4.2
Total votes		101,249	100.0	
Republican hold				

=== District 31 ===
==== Democratic primary ====
Declared

- Nicholas Chiaravalloti, incumbent assemblyman
- Angela V. McKnight, incumbent assemblywoman
- Christopher Munoz, Bayonne school board trustee
- Kristen Zadroga-Hart, high school teacher

Results

31st Legislative District Democratic primary
Party	Candidate	Votes	%
Democratic	Angela V. McKnight	9,621	37.3
Democratic	Nicholas Chiaravalloti	9,073	35.2
Democratic	Kristen Zadroga-Hart	4,081	15.8
Democratic	Christopher Munoz	3,000	11.6
Total votes		25,775	100.0

==== Republican primary ====
Marie Tauro, a commissioner of the Jersey City Municipal Utilities Authority and vice chair of the Jersey City Tea Party Alliance, was planning on running, but was killed in a hit-and-run on April 2, the night before the filing deadline.

Declared

- Michael J. Alonso
- Lauren DiGiaro

Withdrawn

- Neil A. Schulman
- Sonia N. Schulman

Results

31st Legislative District Republican primary
Party	Candidate	Votes	%
Republican	Michael J. Alonso	593	51.5
Republican	Lauren DiGiaro	559	48.5
Total votes		1,152	100.0

==== General election ====
Results

31st Legislative District general election
Party	Candidate	Votes	%	±%
Democratic	Angela V. McKnight (incumbent)	23,616	42.0	▲6.7
Democratic	Nicholas Chiaravalloti (incumbent)	22,823	40.6	▲6.7
Republican	Michael J. Alonso	4,994	8.9	▼5.3
Republican	Lauren DiGiaro	4,766	8.5	▼1.1
Total votes		56,199	100.0	
Democratic hold				

=== District 32 ===
==== Democratic primary ====
Declared

- Angelica M. Jimenez, incumbent assemblywoman
- Vincent Prieto, incumbent assemblyman

Results

32nd Legislative District Democratic primary
Party	Candidate	Votes	%
Democratic	Vincent Prieto	9,912	50.1
Democratic	Angelica M. Jimenez	9,877	49.9
Total votes		19,789	100.0

==== Republican primary ====
Declared

- Ann M. Corletta
- Bartholomew J. Talamini

Results

32nd Legislative District Republican primary
Party	Candidate	Votes	%
Republican	Ann M. Corletta	880	51.1
Republican	Bartholomew J. Talamini	841	48.9
Total votes		1,721	100.0

==== General election ====
Results

32nd Legislative District general election
Party	Candidate	Votes	%	±%
Democratic	Vincent Prieto (incumbent)	23,633	41.0	▼2.0
Democratic	Angelica M. Jimenez (incumbent)	23,063	40.0	▼1.4
Republican	Ann M. Corletta	5,512	9.6	▲1.8
Republican	Bartholomew J. Talamini	5,434	9.4	▲1.6
Total votes		57,642	100.0	
Democratic hold				

=== District 33 ===
==== Democratic primary ====
Declared

- Annette Chaparro, incumbent assemblywoman
- Raj Mukherji, incumbent assemblyman

Results

33rd Legislative District Democratic primary
Party	Candidate	Votes	%
Democratic	Annette Chaparro	18,006	50.3
Democratic	Raj Mukherji	17,786	49.7
Total votes		35,792	100.0

==== Republican primary ====
Declared

- Francisco Aguilar
- Holly Lucyk

Results

33rd Legislative District Republican primary
Party	Candidate	Votes	%
Republican	Francisco Aguilar	932	50.4
Republican	Holly Lucyk	916	49.6
Total votes		1,848	100.0

Following the primary, Aguilar dropped out of the race on September 13.

==== General election ====
Results

33rd Legislative District general election
Party	Candidate	Votes	%	±%
Democratic	Annette Chaparro (incumbent)	32,988	46.7	▲7.1
Democratic	Raj Mukherji (incumbent)	31,997	45.3	▲6.8
Republican	Holly Lucyk	5,697	8.1	▼3.3
Total votes		70,682	100.0	
Democratic hold				

=== District 34 ===
==== Democratic primary ====
Declared

- Thomas P. Giblin, incumbent assemblyman
- Sheila Oliver, incumbent assemblywoman

Results

34th Legislative District Democratic primary
Party	Candidate	Votes	%
Democratic	Sheila Oliver	15,754	51.6
Democratic	Thomas P. Giblin	14,753	48.4
Total votes		30,507	100.0

Following the primary, Oliver was selected by Democratic gubernatorial nominee Phil Murphy to be his nominee for lieutenant governor on July 26. Despite state law prohibiting accepting nominations for more than one office in the same election, Oliver still ran for re-election, with party officials claiming a loophole in the law with her being selected as a running mate instead of being nominated as a candidate in a primary.

==== Republican primary ====
Declared

- Ghalib Mahmoud
- Nicholas G. Surgent

Results

34th Legislative District Republican primary
Party	Candidate	Votes	%
Republican	Nicholas G. Surgent	1,147	53.2
Republican	Ghalib Mahmoud	1,007	46.8
Total votes		2,154	100.0

Mahmoud was replaced on the ballot for the general election by Tafari Anderson.

==== General election ====
Results

34th Legislative District general election
Party	Candidate	Votes	%	±%
Democratic	Sheila Oliver (incumbent)	34,340	43.0	▲1.1
Democratic	Thomas P. Giblin (incumbent)	32,751	41.0	▼1.3
Republican	Nicholas G. Surgent	6,637	8.3	▼4.4
Republican	Tafari Anderson	6,110	7.7	N/A
Total votes		79,838	100.0	
Democratic hold				

=== District 35 ===
==== Democratic primary ====
Declared

- Shavonda E. Sumter, incumbent assemblywoman
- Benjie E. Wimberly, incumbent assemblyman

Results

35th Legislative District Democratic primary
Party	Candidate	Votes	%
Democratic	Benjie E. Wimberly	7,510	50.3
Democratic	Shavonda E. Sumter	7,422	49.7
Total votes		14,932	100.0

==== Republican primary ====
Declared

- Ibrahim Mahmoud
- Nihad Younes

Results

35th Legislative District Republican primary
Party	Candidate	Votes	%
Republican	Ibrahim Mahmoud	985	50.1
Republican	Nihad Younes	981	49.9
Total votes		1,966	100.0

==== General election ====
Results

35th Legislative District general election
Party	Candidate	Votes	%	±%
Democratic	Benjie E. Wimberly (incumbent)	21,406	40.0	▲3.6
Democratic	Shavonda E. Sumter (incumbent)	21,275	39.8	▲3.4
Republican	Ibrahim Mahmoud	5,435	10.2	▼3.6
Republican	Nihad Younes	5,366	10.0	▼3.3
Total votes		53,482	100.0	
Democratic hold				

=== District 36 ===
==== Democratic primary ====
Declared

- Marlene Caride, incumbent assemblywoman
- Gary Schaer, incumbent assemblyman

Results

36th Legislative District Democratic primary
Party	Candidate	Votes	%
Democratic	Marlene Caride	5,990	50.9
Democratic	Gary Schaer	5,779	49.1
Total votes		11,769	100.0

==== Republican primary ====
Declared

- Marc Marsi
- Paul Passamano, former Lyndhurst commissioner

Results

36th Legislative District Republican primary
Party	Candidate	Votes	%
Republican	Paul Passamano Jr.	2,006	51.9
Republican	Marc Marsi	1,857	48.1
Total votes		3,863	100.0

==== General election ====
Results

36th Legislative District general election
Party	Candidate	Votes	%	±%
Democratic	Gary Schaer (incumbent)	22,527	31.9	▼1.2
Democratic	Marlene Caride (incumbent)	22,419	31.8	▼0.6
Republican	Paul Passamano Jr.	13,245	18.8	▲1.7
Republican	Marc Marsi	12,372	17.5	▲1.1
Total votes		70,563	100.0	
Democratic hold				

=== District 37 ===
==== Democratic primary ====
Declared

- Valerie Huttle, incumbent assemblywoman
- Gordon M. Johnson, incumbent assemblyman

Results

37th Legislative District Democratic primary
Party	Candidate	Votes	%
Democratic	Gordon M. Johnson	10,417	50.7
Democratic	Valerie Vainieri Huttle	10,149	49.3
Total votes		20,566	100.0

==== Republican primary ====
Declared

- Margaret Ahn, loan expert and nominee for Fort Lee Borough Council in 2015
- Paul A. Duggan
- Angela Hendricks
- Gino P. Tessaro

Results

37th Legislative District Republican primary
Party	Candidate	Votes	%
Republican	Gino P. Tessaro	1,182	28.1
Republican	Angela Hendricks	1,106	26.3
Republican	Paul A. Duggan	966	22.9
Republican	Margaret S. Ahn	957	22.7
Total votes		4,211	100.0

==== Independents and third parties ====
Declared

- Claudio I. Belusic (Libertarian)

==== General election ====
Results

37th Legislative District general election
Party	Candidate	Votes	%	±%
Democratic	Valerie Vainieri Huttle (incumbent)	31,855	37.4	▲1.5
Democratic	Gordon M. Johnson (incumbent)	31,798	37.3	▲1.5
Republican	Gino P. Tessaro	10,610	12.4	▼1.5
Republican	Angela Hendricks	10,576	12.4	▼2.0
Libertarian	Claudio I. Belusic	392	0.5	N/A
Total votes		85,231	100.0	
Democratic hold				

=== District 38 ===
==== Democratic primary ====
Declared

- Tim Eustace, incumbent assemblyman
- Joseph Lagana, incumbent assemblyman

Results

38th Legislative District Democratic primary
Party	Candidate	Votes	%
Democratic	Tim Eustace	7,299	50.8
Democratic	Joseph A. Lagana	7,060	49.2
Total votes		14,359	100.0

==== Republican primary ====
Declared

- Matthew Seymour, attorney and nominee for New Milford Borough Council in 2015
- Christopher Wolf, pastor and radio show host

Declined

- John Cosgrove, mayor of Fair Lawn

Results

38th Legislative District Republican primary
Party	Candidate	Votes	%
Republican	Matthew S. Seymour	4,191	50.4
Republican	Christopher B. Wolf	4,129	49.6
Total votes		8,320	100.0

Following the primary on July 1, Seymour dropped out, switched party registration, and endorsed the Democratic slate, citing policy differences with the party in regards to domestic violence victims assistance. Former Hasbrouck Heights Borough Councilman Dave Gonzalez and Glen Rock Borough Councilman Bill Leonard declared intentions to run as a replacement, with Gonzalez later dropping out to back Leonard.

==== Independents and third parties ====
Declared

- Dev Goswami (independent), policy analyst

==== General election ====
Results

38th Legislative District general election
Party	Candidate	Votes	%	±%
Democratic	Joseph A. Lagana (incumbent)	30,800	29.3	▲0.2
Democratic	Tim Eustace (incumbent)	30,727	29.2	▲0.1
Republican	William Leonard	21,541	20.5	▼1.4
Republican	Christopher B. Wolf	21,525	20.5	▲0.6
Independent- NJ Awakens	Dev Goswami	533	0.5	N/A
Total votes		105,126	100.0	
Democratic hold				

=== District 39 ===
==== Republican primary ====
Declared

- Robert Auth, incumbent assemblyman
- Holly Schepisi, incumbent assemblywoman

Results

39th Legislative District Republican primary
Party	Candidate	Votes	%
Republican	Holly Schepisi	6,254	50.5
Republican	Robert Auth	6,131	49.5
Total votes		12,385	100.0

==== Democratic primary ====
Declared

- Jannie Chung, Closter borough councilwoman
- Annie Hausmann

Results

39th Legislative District Democratic primary
Party	Candidate	Votes	%
Democratic	Jannie Chung	6,591	50.4
Democratic	Annie Hausman	6,474	49.6
Total votes		13,065	100.0

==== General election ====
Results

39th Legislative District general election
Party	Candidate	Votes	%	±%
Republican	Holly Schepisi (incumbent)	34,158	27.4	▼3.9
Republican	Robert Auth (incumbent)	32,739	26.2	▼2.6
Democratic	Jannie Chung	29,126	23.3	▲3.0
Democratic	Annie Hausmann	28,862	23.1	▲3.4
Total votes		124,885	100.0	
Republican hold				

=== District 40 ===
Incumbent Republican Assemblyman David C. Russo, the longest serving current member of the Assembly, did not run for re-election.

==== Republican primary ====
Declared

- Joseph Bubba Jr., son of former state senator Joseph Bubba
- Christopher DePhillips, former mayor of Wyckoff
- Norman M. Robertson, former state senator (District 34)
- Kevin J. Rooney, incumbent assemblyman

Results

40th Legislative District Republican primary
Party	Candidate	Votes	%
Republican	Kevin J. Rooney	8,251	35.9
Republican	Christopher P. DePhillips	7,647	33.3
Republican	Norman M. Robertson	3,548	15.4
Republican	Joseph L. Bubba Jr.	3,522	15.3
Total votes		22,968	100.0

==== Democratic primary ====
Declared

- Christine Ordway, nominee for Assembly in 2015
- Paul Vagianos, restaurant owner and nominee for Assembly in 2015

Withdrawn

- Andrea L. Brown

Results

40th Legislative District Democratic primary
Party	Candidate	Votes	%
Democratic	Christine Ordway	7,299	50.4
Democratic	Paul Vagianos	7,187	49.6
Total votes		14,486	100.0

==== Independents and third parties ====
Declared

- Anthony J. Pellechia (independent)

==== General election ====
Polling

Poll source	Date(s) administered	Sample size	Margin of error	Generic D	Generic R	Other	Undecided
Public Policy Polling (D)	October 23–25, 2017	667	± 5.0%	39%	39%	<1%	21%

Results

40th Legislative District general election
Party	Candidate	Votes	%	±%
Republican	Kevin J. Rooney (incumbent)	31,170	26.8	▼0.8
Republican	Christopher P. DePhillips	30,610	26.3	▼1.7
Democratic	Christine Ordway	27,092	23.3	▲1.0
Democratic	Paul Vagianos	26,737	23.0	▲0.8
You Tell Me	Anthony J. Pellechia	748	0.6	N/A
Total votes		116,357	100.0	
Republican hold				

== See also ==
- 2017 New Jersey elections
- 2017 New Jersey Senate election
- List of New Jersey state legislatures
