= 2017 New Jersey Senate election =

2017 New Jersey State Senate election
- November 7, 2017

All 40 seats in the New Jersey Senate 21 seats needed for a majority
- Turnout: 39% (▼1pp)
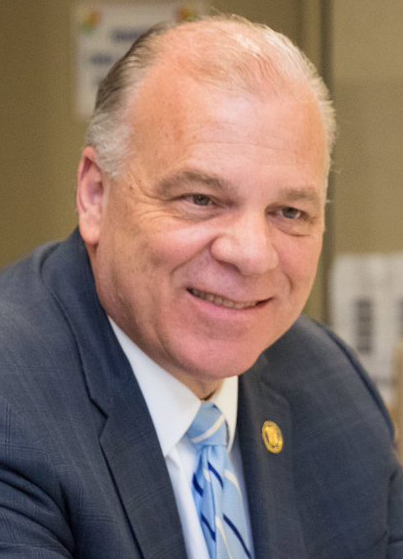

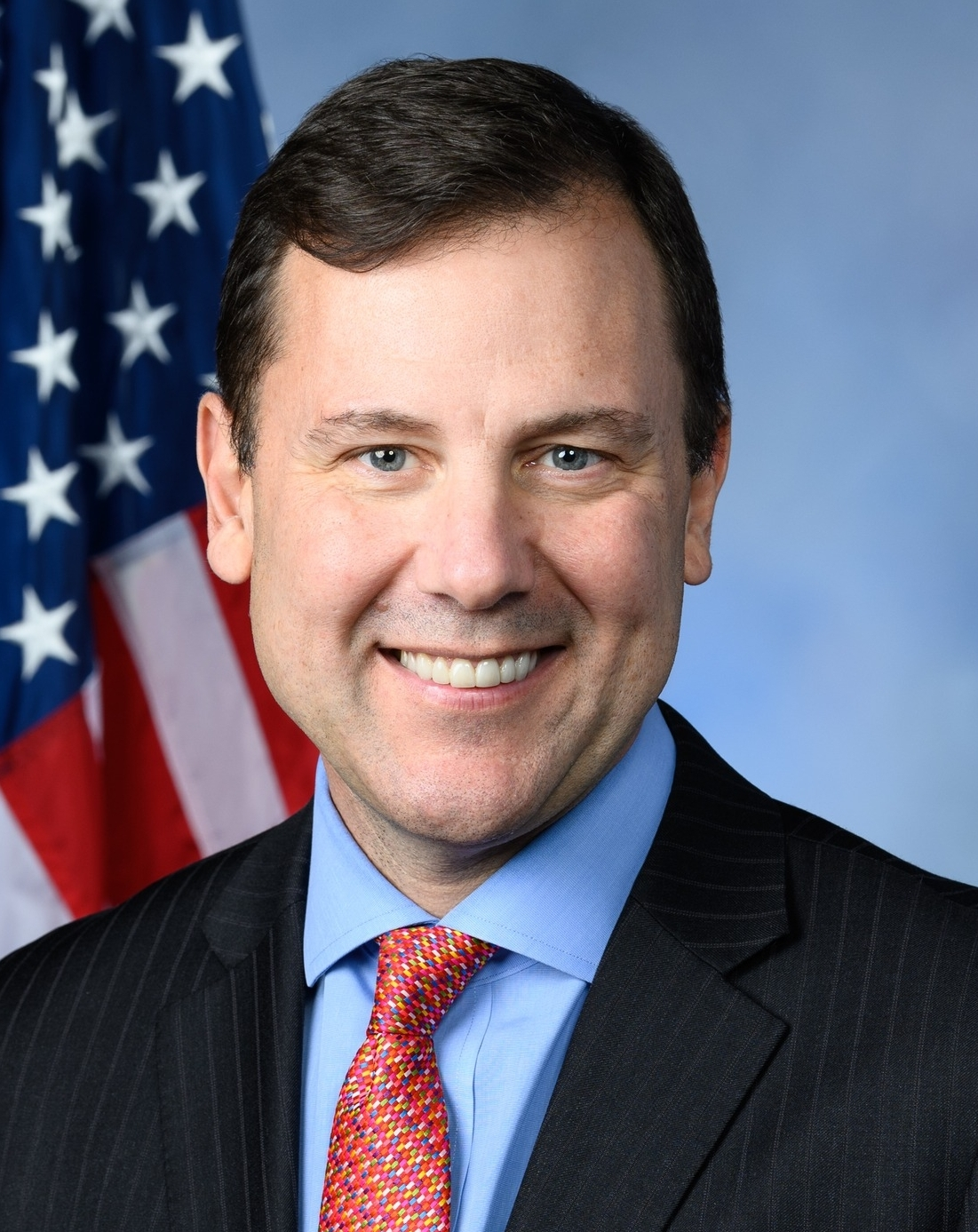
| | Majority party | Minority party |
|---|---|---|
| Leader | Steve Sweeney | Thomas Kean Jr. |
| Party | Democratic | Republican |
| Leader since | January 12, 2010 | January 8, 2008 |
| Leader's seat | 3rd district (West Deptford) | 21st district (Westfield) |
| Last election | 24 | 16 |
| Seats won | 25 | 15 |
| Seat change | ▲1 | ▼1 |
| Popular vote | 1,185,420 | 802,418 |
| Percentage | 59.5% | 40.3% |
| Swing | ▲12.1% | ▼11.8% |
- Results by district Democratic hold Democratic gain Republican hold Republican gain
Senate President before election
Steve Sweeney
Democratic
Elected Senate President
Steve Sweeney
Democratic

The 2017 New Jersey State Senate elections were held on November 7, 2017, to elect senators for all 40 legislative districts across New Jersey. These elections coincided with the election of Governor Phil Murphy. The winners of this election would serve in the 218th New Jersey Legislature, with seats apportioned based on the 2010 United States census. The Democratic Party grew its majority in the Senate, with incumbent Senate President Steve Sweeney re-elected to the top leadership post. Republican Thomas Kean, Jr. continued to lead his party as minority leader. This was the first state Senate election cycle in 10 years where any party flipped a Senate seat.

Democrats flipped the 7th and 11th districts, while Republicans flipped the 2nd. Democrats briefly held 26 seats from January through December 2019 following the party switch of Dawn Addiego, resulting in the Democrats controlling the highest percentage of seats since 1977. However, a 2019 special election in District 1 reduced the Democrats back to 25 seats.

Contents
Summary of results • Incumbents not running
By District: 1 • 2 • 3 • 4 • 5 • 6 • 7 • 8 • 9 • 10 • 11 • 12 • 13 • 14 • 15 • 16 • 17 • 18 • 19 • 20 • 21 • 22 • 23 • 24 • 25 • 26 • 27 • 28 • 29 • 30 • 31 • 32 • 33 • 34 • 35 • 36 • 37 • 38 • 39 • 40

== Summary of results ==
↓
| 25 | 15 |
| Democratic | Republican |

Summary of the November 7, 2017, New Jersey State Senate election results
| Parties | Seats | | | | Popular vote | | |
|---|---|---|---|---|---|---|---|
| Parties | 2013 | 2017 | +/− | Strength | Vote | % | Change |
| Democratic Party | 24 | 25 | ▲1 | 62.50% | 1,185,420 | 59.5% | +12.1% |
| Republican Party | 16 | 15 | ▼1 | 37.50% | 802,418 | 40.3% | −11.8% |
| Green Party | - | - | - | - | 1,306 | 0.1% | - |
| Libertarian Party | - | - | - | - | 574 | <0.1% | −0.1% |
| Independent | - | - | - | - | 2,545 | 0.1% | −0.4% |
| Totals | 40 | 40 | 0 | 100.0% | 1,992,263 | 100.0% | - |
Source: Election Statistics – New Jersey Secretary of State (note: does not include blank, write-in and over/under votes)

Popular vote
| Democratic | 59.50% |
| Republican | 40.28% |
| Green | 0.07% |
| Libertarian | 0.03% |
| Other | 0.13% |

Senate seats
| Democratic | 62.50% |
| Republican | 37.50% |

== Incumbents not seeking re-election ==
=== Democratic ===
- Raymond Lesniak, District 20 (running for governor)

=== Republican ===
- Diane Allen, District 7
- Joe Kyrillos, District 13

In addition, four members who were elected in the prior election in 2013 had since left office: Donald Norcross (D-5th, resigned), Peter J. Barnes III (D-18th, resigned), Kevin J. O'Toole (R-40th, resigned), and Jim Whelan (D-2nd, died in office).

== Summary of results by State Senate district ==
| District | 2016 Pres. | Incumbent | Party | Elected Senator | Party |
|---|---|---|---|---|---|
| 1st Legislative District | R +8.92 | Jeff Van Drew | Dem | Jeff Van Drew | Dem |
| 2nd Legislative District | D+11.44 | Colin Bell | Dem | Chris A. Brown | Rep |
| 3rd Legislative District | R+3.49 | Steve Sweeney | Dem | Steve Sweeney | Dem |
| 4th Legislative District | D+12.43 | Fred Madden | Dem | Fred Madden | Dem |
| 5th Legislative District | D+28.97 | Nilsa Cruz-Perez | Dem | Nilsa Cruz-Perez | Dem |
| 6th Legislative District | D+32.33 | James Beach | Dem | James Beach | Dem |
| 7th Legislative District | D+26.61 | Diane Allen | Rep | Troy Singleton | Dem |
| 8th Legislative District | D+2.34 | Dawn Addiego | Rep | Dawn Addiego | Rep |
| 9th Legislative District | R+28.54 | Christopher Connors | Rep | Christopher Connors | Rep |
| 10th Legislative District | R+31.21 | Jim Holzapfel | Rep | Jim Holzapfel | Rep |
| 11th Legislative District | D+6.71 | Jennifer Beck | Rep | Vin Gopal | Rep |
| 12th Legislative District | R+17.24 | Samuel D. Thompson | Rep | Samuel D. Thompson | Rep |
| 13th Legislative District | R+13.48 | Joe Kyrillos | Rep | Declan O'Scanlon | Rep |
| 14th Legislative District | D+11.68 | Linda Greenstein | Dem | Linda Greenstein | Dem |
| 15th Legislative District | D+49.81 | Shirley Turner | Dem | Shirley Turner | Dem |
| 16th Legislative District | D+14.35 | Kip Bateman | Rep | Kip Bateman | Rep |
| 17th Legislative District | D+44.46 | Bob Smith | Dem | Bob Smith | Dem |
| 18th Legislative District | D+20.56 | Patrick J. Diegnan | Dem | Patrick J. Diegnan | Dem |
| 19th Legislative District | D+21.94 | Joe Vitale | Dem | Joe Vitale | Dem |
| 20th Legislative District | D+56.94 | Raymond Lesniak | Dem | Joseph P. Cryan | Dem |
| 21st Legislative District | D+9.49 | Tom Kean Jr. | Rep | Tom Kean Jr. | Rep |
| 22nd Legislative District | D+32.11 | Nicholas Scutari | Dem | Nicholas Scutari | Dem |
| 23rd Legislative District | R+11.95 | Michael Doherty | Rep | Michael Doherty | Rep |
| 24th Legislative District | R+28.14 | Steve Oroho | Rep | Steve Oroho | Rep |
| 25th Legislative District | D+0.21 | Anthony Bucco | Rep | Anthony Bucco | Rep |
| 26th Legislative District | R+9.91 | Joe Pennacchio | Rep | Joe Pennacchio | Rep |
| 27th Legislative District | D+28.36 | Richard Codey | Dem | Richard Codey | Dem |
| 28th Legislative District | D+62.18 | Ronald Rice | Dem | Ronald Rice | Dem |
| 29th Legislative District | D+69 | Teresa Ruiz | Dem | Teresa Ruiz | Dem |
| 30th Legislative District | R+30.61 | Robert W. Singer | Rep | Robert W. Singer | Rep |
| 31st Legislative District | D+55.84 | Sandra Bolden Cunningham | Dem | Sandra Bolden Cunningham | Dem |
| 32nd Legislative District | D+41.08 | Nicholas Sacco | Dem | Nicholas Sacco | Dem |
| 33rd Legislative District | D+57.65 | Brian Stack | Dem | Brian Stack | Dem |
| 34th Legislative District | D+61.59 | Nia Gill | Dem | Nia Gill | Dem |
| 35th Legislative District | D+55.24 | Nellie Pou | Dem | Nellie Pou | Dem |
| 36th Legislative District | D+16.29 | Paul Sarlo | Dem | Paul Sarlo | Dem |
| 37th Legislative District | D+42.36 | Loretta Weinberg | Dem | Loretta Weinberg | Dem |
| 38th Legislative District | D+9.36 | Robert M. Gordon | Dem | Robert M. Gordon | Dem |
| 39th Legislative District | R+4.05 | Gerald Cardinale | Rep | Gerald Cardinale | Rep |
| 40th Legislative District | R+7.01 | Kristin Corrado | Rep | Kristin Corrado | Rep |

=== Close races ===
Seats where the margin of victory was under 10%:

1. Legislative District 16, 0.8%
2. Legislative District 8, 4.4%
3. Legislative District 25, 4.4%
4. Legislative District 39, 6.5%
5. Legislative District 2, 7% gain
6. Legislative District 11, 7.2% gain
7. Legislative District 21, 9.4%

== Results by district ==
=== District 1 ===
==== Democratic primary ====
Declared

- Jeff Van Drew, incumbent senator

Results

1st Legislative District Democratic primary
| Party | Candidate | Votes | % |
|---|---|---|---|
| Democratic | Jeff Van Drew | 6,410 | 100.0 |
| Total votes | | 6,410 | 100.0 |

==== Republican primary ====
Declared

- Mary Gruccio, auperintendent of Vineland Public Schools and former Cumberland County freeholder

Results

1st Legislative District Republican primary
| Party | Candidate | Votes | % |
|---|---|---|---|
| Republican | Mary Gruccio | 6,279 | 100.0 |
| Total votes | | 6,279 | 100.0 |

==== Independents and third parties ====
Declared

- Anthony Parisi Sanchez (independent), community activist and former Marine Corps reservist

==== General election ====
Endorsements

Jeff Van Drew (incumbent)

Organizations

- Firefighters Mutual Benevolent Association
- New Jersey Education Association PAC
- NEW JOBS PAC
Mary Gruccio

Organizations

- American Federations of Teachers

Polling

| Poll source | Date(s) administered | Sample size | Margin of error | Jeff Van Drew (D) | Mary Gruccio (R) | Other | Undecided |
|---|---|---|---|---|---|---|---|
| Stockton University | September 13–18, 2017 | 430 LV | ± 4.7% | 61% | 28% | 4% | 5% |

Results

1st Legislative District general election
| Party | Candidate | Votes | % | ±% |
|---|---|---|---|---|
| Democratic | Jeff Van Drew (incumbent) | 35,464 | 64.8 | ▲5.4 |
| Republican | Mary Gruccio | 18,589 | 34.0 | ▼5.2 |
| Cannot Be Bought | Anthony Parisi Sanchez | 652 | 1.2 | N/A |
| Total votes | | 54,705 | 100.0 | |
| Democratic hold | | | | |

=== District 2 ===
Incumbent Democratic senator Jim Whelan declined to seek a fourth term, announcing his retirement on January 4, 2017. Whelan died in office on August 22.

==== Democratic primary ====
Declared

- Colin Bell, former Atlantic County freeholder and nominee for Assembly in 2015

Withdrawn

- Vince Mazzeo, state assemblyman (running for re-election)

Results

2nd Legislative District Democratic primary
| Party | Candidate | Votes | % |
|---|---|---|---|
| Democratic | Colin Bell | 7,928 | 100.0 |
| Total votes | | 7,928 | 100.0 |

Following the death of Whelan on August 22, 2017, Bell was unanimously selected to fill the remainder of his term by local Democratic committee members on September 5, and was sworn in on October 5.

==== Republican primary ====
Declared

- Chris A. Brown, state assemblyman

Results

2nd Legislative District Republican primary
| Party | Candidate | Votes | % |
|---|---|---|---|
| Republican | Chris Brown | 5,981 | 100.0 |
| Total votes | | 5,981 | 100.0 |

==== General election ====
Endorsements

Colin Bell (incumbent)

Organizations

- American Federations of Teachers
- Environment NJ
- Health Professionals and Allied Employees of New Jersey
- New Jersey Building & Construction Trades Council
- NJ Nurses Economic Security Organization
- Sierra Club of New Jersey
- UAW Casino Workers
Chris Brown

Organizations

- Firefighters Mutual Benevolent Association
- League of Conservation Voters
- New Jersey Education Association PAC
- United Here Local 54

Polling

| Poll source | Date(s) administered | Sample size | Margin of error | Colin Bell (D) | Chris Brown (R) | Other | Undecided |
|---|---|---|---|---|---|---|---|
| Stockton University | October 26 – November 1, 2017 | 530 LV | ± 4.3% | 43% | 46% | 1% | 8% |
| Stockton University | September 23–28, 2017 | 521 LV | ± 4.3% | 46.5% | 46.2% | <1% | 5% |

Results

2nd Legislative District general election
| Party | Candidate | Votes | % | ±% |
|---|---|---|---|---|
| Republican | Chris Brown | 26,950 | 53.5 | ▲8.5 |
| Democratic | Colin Bell (incumbent) | 23,406 | 46.5 | ▼8.5 |
| Total votes | | 50,356 | 100.0 | |
| Republican gain from Democratic | | | | |

=== District 3 ===
==== Democratic primary ====
Declared

- Stephen M. Sweeney, incumbent senator

Results

3rd Legislative District Democratic primary
| Party | Candidate | Votes | % |
|---|---|---|---|
| Democratic | Steve Sweeney | 7,748 | 100.0 |
| Total votes | | 7,748 | 100.0 |

==== Republican primary ====
Declared

- Fran Grenier, chairman of the Salem County Republican Party and former Woodstown borough councilman

Results

3rd Legislative District Republican primary
| Party | Candidate | Votes | % |
|---|---|---|---|
| Republican | Fran Grenier | 4,144 | 100.0 |
| Total votes | | 4,144 | 100.0 |

==== General election ====
Polling

| Poll source | Date(s) administered | Sample size | Margin of error | Stephen M. Sweeney (D) | Fran Grenier (R) | Undecided |
|---|---|---|---|---|---|---|
| Global Strategy Group | October 9–12, 2017 | 402 LV | ± 4.9% | 48% | 36% | 14% |
| Cygnal (R) | October 9–11, 2017 | 402 LV | ± 4.87% | 42% | 36% | 22% |
| Cygnal (R) | September 19–20, 2017 | 402 LV | ± 4.87% | 48% | 30% | 22% |

Endorsements

Steve Sweeney (incumbent)

Individuals

- Phil Murphy, former United States Ambassador to Germany and candidate for governor of New Jersey

Organizations

- AFL–CIO of New Jersey
- American Federations of Teachers
- Firefighters Mutual Benevolent Association
- NEW JOBS PAC
- NJ Advisory Council on Safety and Health
- Police Benevolent Association of New Jersey
Fran Grenier

U.S. representatives

- Frank LoBiondo, representative for New Jersey's 2nd congressional district

Organizations

- New Jersey Education Association PAC

Results

3rd Legislative District general election
| Party | Candidate | Votes | % | ±% |
|---|---|---|---|---|
| Democratic | Steve Sweeney (incumbent) | 31,822 | 58.8 | ▲4.0 |
| Republican | Fran Grenier | 22,336 | 41.2 | ▼4.0 |
| Total votes | | 54,158 | 100.0 | |
| Democratic hold | | | | |

=== District 4 ===
==== Democratic primary ====
Declared

- Fred H. Madden, incumbent senator

Results

4th Legislative District Democratic primary
| Party | Candidate | Votes | % |
|---|---|---|---|
| Democratic | Fred H. Madden | 11,349 | 100.0 |
| Total votes | | 11,349 | 100.0 |

==== Republican primary ====
Declared

- Michael Pascetta

Results

4th Legislative District Republican primary
| Party | Candidate | Votes | % |
|---|---|---|---|
| Republican | Michael Pascetta | 3,713 | 100.0 |
| Total votes | | 3,713 | 100.0 |

Pascetta was not on the official list of candidates for the general election.

==== General election ====
Endorsements

Fred Madden (incumbent)

Organizations

- AFL–CIO of New Jersey
- American Federations of Teachers
- Firefighters Mutual Benevolent Association
- New Jersey Education Association PAC
- NEW JOBS PAC

Results

4th Legislative District general election
| Party | Candidate | Votes | % | ±% |
|---|---|---|---|---|
| Democratic | Fred H. Madden (incumbent) | 38,790 | 100.0 | ▲42.1 |
| Total votes | | 38,790 | 100.0 | |
| Democratic hold | | | | |

=== District 5 ===
==== Democratic primary ====
Declared

- Nilsa Cruz-Perez, incumbent senator

Results

5th Legislative District Democratic primary
| Party | Candidate | Votes | % |
|---|---|---|---|
| Democratic | Nilsa Cruz-Perez | 11,069 | 100.0 |
| Total votes | | 11,069 | 100.0 |

==== Republican primary ====
Declared

- Keith Walker, nominee for Senate in 2011 and 2013

Results

5th Legislative District Republican primary
| Party | Candidate | Votes | % |
|---|---|---|---|
| Republican | Keith Walker | 2,557 | 100.0 |
| Total votes | | 2,557 | 100.0 |

==== Independents and third parties ====
Declared

- Mohammad Kabir (independent)

==== General election ====
Endorsements

Nilsa Cruz-Perez (incumbent)

Organizations

- AFL–CIO of New Jersey
- American Federations of Teachers
- Firefighters Mutual Benevolent Association
- Latinas United for Political Empowerment
- Maria's Women United
- New Jersey Education Association PAC
- NEW JOBS PAC
- PAM's List
- Working Families Alliance

Results

5th Legislative District general election
| Party | Candidate | Votes | % | ±% |
|---|---|---|---|---|
| Democratic | Nilsa Cruz-Perez (incumbent) | 29,031 | 66.1 | ▼33.9 |
| Republican | Keith Walker | 14,463 | 32.9 | N/A |
| Challenge Promise Fix | Mohammad Kabir | 454 | 1.0 | N/A |
| Total votes | | 43,948 | 100.0 | |
| Democratic hold | | | | |

=== District 6 ===
==== Democratic primary ====
Declared

- James Beach, incumbent senator

Results

6th Legislative District Democratic primary
| Party | Candidate | Votes | % |
|---|---|---|---|
| Democratic | James Beach | 14,344 | 100.0 |
| Total votes | | 14,344 | 100.0 |

==== Republican primary ====
Declared

- Robert Shapiro

Results

6th Legislative District Republican primary
| Party | Candidate | Votes | % |
|---|---|---|---|
| Republican | Robert Shapiro | 4,037 | 100.0 |
| Total votes | | 4,037 | 100.0 |

==== General election ====
Endorsements

James Beach (incumbent)

Organizations

- AFL–CIO of New Jersey
- American Federations of Teachers
- Firefighters Mutual Benevolent Association
- New Jersey Education Association PAC
- NEW JOBS PAC
- Planned Parenthood Action Fund of NJ

Results

6th Legislative District general election
| Party | Candidate | Votes | % | ±% |
|---|---|---|---|---|
| Democratic | James Beach (incumbent) | 41,376 | 69.4 | ▲6.0 |
| Republican | Robert Shapiro | 18,249 | 30.6 | ▼6.0 |
| Total votes | | 59,625 | 100.0 | |
| Democratic hold | | | | |

=== District 7 ===
Citing health concerns, incumbent Republican senator Diane Allen declined to run for a seventh term, announcing her retirement on January 31, 2017.

==== Republican primary ====
Declared

- Rob Prisco, Riverside Township committeeman and nominee for Assembly in 2015

Results

7th Legislative District Republican primary
| Party | Candidate | Votes | % |
|---|---|---|---|
| Republican | Rob Prisco | 5,803 | 100.0 |
| Total votes | | 5,803 | 100.0 |

On June 13, Governor Chris Christie nominated Prisco to a worker's compensation judgeship, whom consequently would later drop out. Local Republican committee members selected Delanco Mayor John Browne as a replacement candidate on September 6.

==== Democratic primary ====
Declared

- Troy Singleton, state assemblyman

Withdrawn

- Cory Cottingham

Declined

- Herb Conaway, state assemblyman (running for re-election)
- Carol A. Murphy, director of policy and communication for Assemblywoman Gabriela Mosquera (running for Assembly)

Results

7th Legislative District Democratic primary
| Party | Candidate | Votes | % |
|---|---|---|---|
| Democratic | Troy Singleton | 13,434 | 100.0 |
| Total votes | | 13,434 | 100.0 |

==== General election ====
Endorsements

Troy Singleton

U.S. representatives

- Donald Norcross, representative for New Jersey's 1st congressional district

Other elected officials

- Stephen M. Sweeney, president of the New Jersey Senate

Organizations

- AFL–CIO of New Jersey
- American Federations of Teachers
- Firefighters Mutual Benevolent Association
- League of Conservation Voters
- New Jersey Education Association PAC
- NEW JOBS PAC
- Planned Parenthood Action Fund of NJ
- Working Families Alliance

Results

7th Legislative District general election
| Party | Candidate | Votes | % | ±% |
|---|---|---|---|---|
| Democratic | Troy Singleton | 40,685 | 65.7 | ▲26.1 |
| Republican | John Browne | 21,229 | 34.3 | ▼26.1 |
| Total votes | | 61,914 | 100.0 | |
| Democratic gain from Republican | | | | |

=== District 8 ===
==== Republican primary ====
Declared

- Dawn Marie Addiego, incumbent senator

Results

8th Legislative District Republican primary
| Party | Candidate | Votes | % |
|---|---|---|---|
| Republican | Dawn Marie Addiego | 6,668 | 100.0 |
| Total votes | | 6,668 | 100.0 |

==== Democratic primary ====
Declared

- George B. Youngkin

Results

8th Legislative District Democratic primary
| Party | Candidate | Votes | % |
|---|---|---|---|
| Democratic | George B. Youngkin | 8,337 | 100.0 |
| Total votes | | 8,337 | 100.0 |

==== General election ====
Endorsements

George Youngkin

Organizations

- AFL–CIO of New Jersey
- American Federations of Teachers
- New Jersey Education Association PAC
- NEW JOBS PAC
- Sierra Club of New Jersey

Results

8th Legislative District general election
| Party | Candidate | Votes | % | ±% |
|---|---|---|---|---|
| Republican | Dawn Marie Addiego (incumbent) | 30,795 | 52.2 | ▼11.3 |
| Democratic | George B. Youngkin | 28,158 | 47.8 | ▲11.3 |
| Total votes | | 58,953 | 100.0 | |
| Republican hold | | | | |

=== District 9 ===
==== Republican primary ====
Declared

- Christopher J. Connors, incumbent senator

Results

9th Legislative District Republican primary
| Party | Candidate | Votes | % |
|---|---|---|---|
| Republican | Christopher J. Connors | 9,268 | 100.0 |
| Total votes | | 9,268 | 100.0 |

==== Democratic primary ====
Declared

- Brian Corley White, attorney

Results

9th Legislative District Democratic primary
| Party | Candidate | Votes | % |
|---|---|---|---|
| Democratic | Brian Corley White | 5,716 | 100.0 |
| Total votes | | 5,716 | 100.0 |

==== General election ====
Endorsements

Christopher Connors (incumbent)

Organizations

- New Jersey Education Association PAC
- NEW JOBS PAC
Brian Corley White

Organizations

- AFL–CIO of New Jersey
- American Federations of Teachers

Results

9th Legislative District general election
| Party | Candidate | Votes | % | ±% |
|---|---|---|---|---|
| Republican | Christopher J. Connors (incumbent) | 41,438 | 64.6 | ▼6.2 |
| Democratic | Brian Corley White | 22,717 | 35.4 | ▲6.2 |
| Total votes | | 64,155 | 100.0 | |
| Republican hold | | | | |

=== District 10 ===
==== Republican primary ====
Declared

- James W. Holzapfel, incumbent senator

Results

10th Legislative District Republican primary
| Party | Candidate | Votes | % |
|---|---|---|---|
| Republican | Jim Holzapfel | 8,876 | 100.0 |
| Total votes | | 8,876 | 100.0 |

==== Democratic primary ====
Declared

- Emma Mammano, mental health counselor

Results

10th Legislative District Democratic primary
| Party | Candidate | Votes | % |
|---|---|---|---|
| Democratic | Emma L. Mammano | 5,565 | 100.0 |
| Total votes | | 5,565 | 100.0 |

==== General election ====
Endorsements

Jim Holzapfel (incumbent)

Organizations

- NEW JOBS PAC
- Sierra Club of New Jersey
Emma Mammano

Organizations

- AFL–CIO of New Jersey
- American Federations of Teachers
- PAM's List

Results

10th Legislative District general election
| Party | Candidate | Votes | % | ±% |
|---|---|---|---|---|
| Republican | Jim Holzapfel (incumbent) | 39,555 | 62.5 | ▼7.2 |
| Democratic | Emma L. Mammano | 23,707 | 37.5 | ▲7.2 |
| Total votes | | 63,262 | 100.0 | |
| Republican hold | | | | |

=== District 11 ===
==== Republican primary ====
Declared

- Jennifer Beck, incumbent senator

Results

11th Legislative District Republican primary
| Party | Candidate | Votes | % |
|---|---|---|---|
| Republican | Jennifer Beck | 5,093 | 100.0 |
| Total votes | | 5,093 | 100.0 |

==== Democratic primary ====
Declared

- Vin Gopal, businessman, nominee for Assembly in 2011, and former chairman of the Monmouth County Democratic Party (resigned upon declaration)

Results

11th Legislative District Democratic primary
| Party | Candidate | Votes | % |
|---|---|---|---|
| Democratic | Vin Gopal | 8,496 | 100.0 |
| Total votes | | 8,496 | 100.0 |

==== General election ====
Endorsements

Jennifer Beck (incumbent)

Newspapers

- Asbury Park Press

Organizations

- NEW JOBS PAC
Vin Gopal

Organizations

- AFL–CIO of New Jersey
- American Federations of Teachers
- Communication Workers of America
- District Council 711 International Union of Painters and Allied Trades
- Environment NJ
- Firefighters Mutual Benevolent Association
- Garden State Equality
- Health Professionals and Allied Employees of New Jersey
- League of Conservation Voters
- New Jersey Education Association PAC
- Planned Parenthood Action Fund of NJ
- Sierra Club of New Jersey

Polling

| Poll source | Date(s) administered | Sample size | Margin of error | Jennifer Beck (R) | Vin Gopal (D) |
|---|---|---|---|---|---|
| Greenberg Quinlan Rosner (D) | October 30 – November 1, 2017 | 400 LV | ± 4.9% | 48% | 49% |
| Greenberg Quinlan Rosner (D) | July 17–19, 2017 | 400 LV | ± 4.9% | 52% | 41% |

Results

11th Legislative District general election
| Party | Candidate | Votes | % | ±% |
|---|---|---|---|---|
| Democratic | Vin Gopal | 31,308 | 53.6 | ▲14.8 |
| Republican | Jennifer Beck (incumbent) | 27,150 | 46.4 | ▼13.6 |
| Total votes | | 58,458 | 100.0 | |
| Democratic gain from Republican | | | | |

=== District 12 ===
==== Republican primary ====
Declared

- Art Haney, chairman of the Old Bridge Republican Party and former mayor of Old Bridge
- Samuel D. Thompson, incumbent senator

Endorsements

Art Haney

Organizations

- Burlington County Republican Committee

Results

12th Legislative District Republican primary
| Party | Candidate | Votes | % |
|---|---|---|---|
| Republican | Samuel D. Thompson | 4,277 | 59.8 |
| Republican | Art Haney | 2,873 | 40.2 |
| Total votes | | 7,150 | 100.0 |

==== Democratic primary ====
Declared

- David Lande, attorney

Results

12th Legislative District Democratic primary
| Party | Candidate | Votes | % |
|---|---|---|---|
| Democratic | David H. Lande | 5,818 | 100.0 |
| Total votes | | 5,818 | 100.0 |

==== Independents and third parties ====
Declared

- Kevin Antoine (independent), SUNY health professor

==== General election ====
Endorsements

Samuel D. Thompson (incumbent)

Organizations

- NEW JOBS PAC
David Lande

Organizations

- AFL–CIO of New Jersey
- American Federations of Teachers
- New Jersey Education Association PAC
- Planned Parenthood Action Fund of NJ

Results

12th Legislative District general election
| Party | Candidate | Votes | % | ±% |
|---|---|---|---|---|
| Republican | Samuel D. Thompson (incumbent) | 30,013 | 56.7 | ▼8.7 |
| Democratic | David H. Lande | 21,888 | 41.4 | ▲6.8 |
| Coach Kev | Kevin Antoine | 990 | 1.9 | N/A |
| Total votes | | 52,891 | 100.0 | |
| Republican hold | | | | |

=== District 13 ===
Incumbent Republican senator Joe Kyrillos announced that he would not run for a ninth term on October 25, 2016.

==== Republican primary ====
Declared

- Declan O'Scanlon, state assemblyman

Withdrawn

- Amy Handlin, state assemblywoman (running for re-election)

Results

13th Legislative District Republican primary
| Party | Candidate | Votes | % |
|---|---|---|---|
| Republican | Declan O'Scanlon | 5,943 | 100.0 |
| Total votes | | 5,943 | 100.0 |

==== Democratic primary ====
Declared

- Sean Byrnes, former Middletown Township committeeman
- Joshua Leinsdorf, former Princeton school board member and perennial candidate

Results

13th Legislative District Democratic primary
| Party | Candidate | Votes | % |
|---|---|---|---|
| Democratic | Sean F. Byrnes | 7,252 | 92.8 |
| Democratic | Joshua Leinsdorf | 566 | 7.2 |
| Total votes | | 7,818 | 100.0 |

==== General election ====
Endorsements

Sean Byrnes

Organizations

- AFL–CIO of New Jersey
- American Federations of Teachers
- Firefighters Mutual Benevolent Association
- New Jersey Education Association PAC
- Sierra Club of New Jersey
Declan O'Scanlon

State legislators

- Sen. Jennifer Beck, state senator from Legislative District 11

Organizations

- NEW JOBS PAC

Results

13th Legislative District general election
| Party | Candidate | Votes | % | ±% |
|---|---|---|---|---|
| Republican | Declan O’Scanlon | 34,976 | 55.1 | ▼13.0 |
| Democratic | Sean F. Byrnes | 28,493 | 44.9 | ▲14.3 |
| Total votes | | 63,469 | 100.0 | |
| Republican hold | | | | |

=== District 14 ===
==== Democratic primary ====
Declared

- Linda R. Greenstein, incumbent senator

Results

14th Legislative District Democratic primary
| Party | Candidate | Votes | % |
|---|---|---|---|
| Democratic | Linda R. Greenstein | 10,890 | 100.0 |
| Total votes | | 10,890 | 100.0 |

==== Republican primary ====
Declared

- Bruce MacDonald, jewelry store owner
- Ileana Schirmer, Hamilton Township (Mercer) councilwoman

Results

14th Legislative District Republican primary
| Party | Candidate | Votes | % |
|---|---|---|---|
| Republican | Ileana Schirmer | 3,481 | 80.9 |
| Republican | Bruce C. MacDonald | 824 | 19.1 |
| Total votes | | 4,305 | 100.0 |

==== General election ====
Endorsements

Linda Greenstein (incumbent)

Organizations

- AFL–CIO of New Jersey
- American Federations of Teachers
- Environment NJ
- Firefighters Mutual Benevolent Association
- League of Conservation Voters
- New Jersey Education Association PAC
- PAM's List
- Planned Parenthood Action Fund of NJ
- Sierra Club of New Jersey
Ileana Schirmer

U.S. senators

- Marco Rubio, U.S. senator from Florida

State legislators

- Sen. Diane Allen, state senator from Legislative District 7

Organizations

- Hamilton Township Education Association
- Latinas United for Political Empowerment
- National Federation of Independent Businesses
- NEW JOBS PAC
- Republican State Leadership Committee

Results

14th Legislative District general election
| Party | Candidate | Votes | % | ±% |
|---|---|---|---|---|
| Democratic | Linda R. Greenstein (incumbent) | 34,474 | 56.5 | ▲6.1 |
| Republican | Ileana Schirmer | 26,548 | 43.5 | ▼4.5 |
| Total votes | | 61,022 | 100.0 | |
| Democratic hold | | | | |

=== District 15 ===
==== Democratic primary ====
Declared

- Shirley Turner, incumbent senator

Results

15th Legislative District Democratic primary
| Party | Candidate | Votes | % |
|---|---|---|---|
| Democratic | Shirley K. Turner | 13,783 | 100.0 |
| Total votes | | 13,783 | 100.0 |

==== Republican primary ====
Declared

- Lee Eric Newton

Results

15th Legislative District Republican primary
| Party | Candidate | Votes | % |
|---|---|---|---|
| Republican | Lee Eric Newton | 2,245 | 100.0 |
| Total votes | | 2,245 | 100.0 |

==== General election ====
Endorsements

Shirley Turner (incumbent)

Organizations

- AFL–CIO of New Jersey
- American Federations of Teachers
- Firefighters Mutual Benevolent Association
- New Jersey Education Association PAC
- NEW JOBS PAC
- PAM's List
- Planned Parenthood Action Fund of NJ
- Sierra Club of New Jersey
- Working Families Alliance

Results

15th Legislative District general election
| Party | Candidate | Votes | % | ±% |
|---|---|---|---|---|
| Democratic | Shirley K. Turner (incumbent) | 36,624 | 74.0 | ▲10.7 |
| Republican | Lee Eric Newton | 12,839 | 26.0 | ▼10.7 |
| Total votes | | 49,463 | 100.0 | |
| Democratic hold | | | | |

=== District 16 ===
==== Republican primary ====
Declared

- Christopher Bateman, incumbent senator

Results

16th Legislative District Republican primary
| Party | Candidate | Votes | % |
|---|---|---|---|
| Republican | Christopher "Kip" Bateman | 8,402 | 100.0 |
| Total votes | | 8,402 | 100.0 |

==== Democratic primary ====
Declared

- Laurie Poppe, attorney, social worker, and nominee for Hillsborough Township Committee in 2015 and 2016

Withdrawn

- Zenon Christodoulu, businessman

Declined

- Andrew Koontz, Mercer County freeholder
- Liz Lempert, mayor of Princeton
- Andrew Zwicker, state assemblyman (running for re-election)

Results

16th Legislative District Democratic primary
| Party | Candidate | Votes | % |
|---|---|---|---|
| Democratic | Laurie Poppe | 10,727 | 100.0 |
| Total votes | | 10,727 | 100.0 |

==== General election ====
Endorsements

Christopher "Kip" Bateman (incumbent)

Organizations

- Environment NJ
- League of Conservation Voters
- NEW JOBS PAC
- Planned Parenthood Action Fund of NJ
- Sierra Club of New Jersey
Laurie Poppe

Organizations

- AFL–CIO of New Jersey
- American Federations of Teachers
- EMILY's List
- Maria's Women United
- National Association of Social Workers
- NJ Nurses Economic Security Organization
- PAM's List
- Professional Firefighters Association of New Jersey
- United Auto Workers, Region 9

Polling

| Poll source | Date(s) administered | Sample size | Margin of error | Christopher Bateman (R) | Laurie Poppe (D) |
|---|---|---|---|---|---|
| Greenberg Quinlan Rosner | August 17–21, 2017 | 401 LV | ± 4.9% | 48% | 40% |

Results

16th Legislative District general election
| Party | Candidate | Votes | % | ±% |
|---|---|---|---|---|
| Republican | Christopher "Kip" Bateman (incumbent) | 32,229 | 50.4 | ▼9.9 |
| Democratic | Laurie Poppe | 31,655 | 49.6 | ▲9.9 |
| Total votes | | 63,884 | 100.0 | |
| Republican hold | | | | |

=== District 17 ===
==== Democratic primary ====
Declared

- Bill Irwin, Piscataway Board of Education president
- Bob Smith, incumbent senator

Results

17th Legislative District Democratic primary
| Party | Candidate | Votes | % |
|---|---|---|---|
| Democratic | Bob Smith | 10,103 | 72.0 |
| Democratic | William J. Irwin | 3,933 | 28.0 |
| Total votes | | 14,036 | 100.0 |

==== Republican primary ====
Declared

- Daryl J. Kipnis, attorney

Results

17th Legislative District Republican primary
| Party | Candidate | Votes | % |
|---|---|---|---|
| Republican | Daryl J. Kipnis | 2,069 | 100.0 |
| Total votes | | 2,069 | 100.0 |

==== General election ====
Endorsements

Bob Smith (incumbent)

Organizations

- AFL–CIO of New Jersey
- American Federations of Teachers
- Firefighters Mutual Benevolent Association
- League of Conservation Voters
- Planned Parenthood Action Fund of NJ
- Sierra Club of New Jersey
Daryl Kipnis

Organizations

- League of Humane Voters

Results

17th Legislative District general election
| Party | Candidate | Votes | % | ±% |
|---|---|---|---|---|
| Democratic | Bob Smith (incumbent) | 29,816 | 71.4 | ▲11.6 |
| Republican | Daryl J. Kipnis | 11,921 | 28.6 | ▼11.6 |
| Total votes | | 41,737 | 100.0 | |
| Democratic hold | | | | |

=== District 18 ===
==== Democratic primary ====
Declared

- Patrick J. Diegnan, incumbent senator

Results

18th Legislative District Democratic primary
| Party | Candidate | Votes | % |
|---|---|---|---|
| Democratic | Patrick J. Diegnan Jr. | 11,461 | 100.0 |
| Total votes | | 11,461 | 100.0 |

==== Republican primary ====
Declared

- Mark Csizmar, former East Brunswick police officer and nominee for East Brunswick Township Council in 2016

Results

18th Legislative District Republican primary
| Party | Candidate | Votes | % |
|---|---|---|---|
| Republican | Mark Csizmar | 2,561 | 100.0 |
| Total votes | | 2,561 | 100.0 |

Csizmar was replaced on the ballot for the general election by Lewis Glogower, who was previously one of the nominees for the Assembly seat.

==== General election ====
Endorsements

Patrick Diegnan (incumbent)

Organizations

- AFL–CIO of New Jersey
- American Federations of Teachers
- Firefighters Mutual Benevolent Association
- League of Conservation Voters
- New Jersey Education Association PAC
- NEW JOBS PAC
- Planned Parenthood Action Fund of NJ
- Sierra Club of New Jersey
- Working Families Alliance

Results

18th Legislative District general election
| Party | Candidate | Votes | % | ±% |
|---|---|---|---|---|
| Democratic | Patrick J. Diegnan Jr. (incumbent) | 32,175 | 65.6 | ▲3.9 |
| Republican | Lewis Glogower | 16,860 | 34.4 | ▼3.9 |
| Total votes | | 49,035 | 100.0 | |
| Democratic hold | | | | |

=== District 19 ===
==== Democratic primary ====
Declared

- Joe Vitale, incumbent senator

Results

19th Legislative District Democratic primary
| Party | Candidate | Votes | % |
|---|---|---|---|
| Democratic | Joseph F. Vitale | 9,038 | 100.0 |
| Total votes | | 9,038 | 100.0 |

==== Republican primary ====
Declared

- Arthur J. Rittenhouse Jr.

Results

19th Legislative District Republican primary
| Party | Candidate | Votes | % |
|---|---|---|---|
| Republican | Arthur J. Rittenhouse Jr. | 1,838 | 100.0 |
| Total votes | | 1,838 | 100.0 |

Following the primary, Rittenhouse dropped out of the race on September 14.

==== General election ====
Endorsements

Joseph Vitale (incumbent)

Organizations

- AFL–CIO of New Jersey
- American Federations of Teachers
- Firefighters Mutual Benevolent Association
- League of Conservation Voters
- New Jersey Education Association PAC
- NEW JOBS PAC
- Planned Parenthood Action Fund of NJ
- Sierra Club of New Jersey

Results

19th Legislative District general election
| Party | Candidate | Votes | % | ±% |
|---|---|---|---|---|
| Democratic | Joseph F. Vitale (incumbent) | 27,681 | 100.0 | ▲37.4 |
| Total votes | | 27,681 | 100.0 | |
| Democratic hold | | | | |

=== District 20 ===
Incumbent Democratic senator Raymond Lesniak declined to run for re-election and instead ran for governor.

==== Democratic primary ====
Declared

- Joseph Cryan, Union County Sheriff, former state assemblyman, and former chairman of the New Jersey Democratic State Committee

Results

20th Legislative District Democratic primary
| Party | Candidate | Votes | % |
|---|---|---|---|
| Democratic | Joseph P. Cryan | 9,666 | 100.0 |
| Total votes | | 9,666 | 100.0 |

==== Republican primary ====
Declared

- Ashraf Hanna

Results

20th Legislative District Republican primary
| Party | Candidate | Votes | % |
|---|---|---|---|
| Republican | Ashraf Hanna | 690 | 100.0 |
| Total votes | | 690 | 100.0 |

==== General election ====
Endorsements

Joseph Cryan

Organizations

- AFL–CIO of New Jersey
- American Federations of Teachers
- Firefighters Mutual Benevolent Association
- New Jersey Education Association PAC
- NEW JOBS PAC
- Working Families Alliance

Results

20th Legislative District general election
| Party | Candidate | Votes | % | ±% |
|---|---|---|---|---|
| Democratic | Joseph P. Cryan | 25,772 | 83.7 | ▼16.3 |
| Republican | Ashraf Hanna | 5,023 | 16.3 | N/A |
| Total votes | | 30,795 | 100.0 | |
| Democratic hold | | | | |

=== District 21 ===
==== Republican primary ====
Declared

- Thomas Kean Jr., incumbent senator

Results

21st Legislative District Republican primary
| Party | Candidate | Votes | % |
|---|---|---|---|
| Republican | Thomas H. Kean Jr. | 7,789 | 100.0 |
| Total votes | | 7,789 | 100.0 |

==== Democratic primary ====
Declared

- Jill LaZare, attorney and nominee for Assembly in 2013 and 2015

Results

21st Legislative District Democratic primary
| Party | Candidate | Votes | % |
|---|---|---|---|
| Democratic | Jill LaZare | 5,686 | 100.0 |
| Total votes | | 5,686 | 100.0 |

==== General election ====
Endorsements

Thomas Kean Jr. (incumbent)

Organizations

- Firefighters Mutual Benevolent Association
- NEW JOBS PAC
Jill LaZare

Organizations

- American Federations of Teachers
- PAM's List
- Planned Parenthood Action Fund of NJ
- Working Families Alliance

Results

21st Legislative District general election
| Party | Candidate | Votes | % | ±% |
|---|---|---|---|---|
| Republican | Thomas H. Kean Jr. (incumbent) | 37,579 | 54.7 | ▼14.9 |
| Democratic | Jill LaZare | 31,123 | 45.3 | ▲14.9 |
| Total votes | | 68,702 | 100.0 | |
| Republican hold | | | | |

=== District 22 ===
==== Democratic primary ====
Declared

- Nicholas Scutari, incumbent senator

Results

22nd Legislative District Democratic primary
| Party | Candidate | Votes | % |
|---|---|---|---|
| Democratic | Nicholas P. Scutari | 11,326 | 100.0 |
| Total votes | | 11,326 | 100.0 |

==== Republican primary ====
Declared

- Joseph A. Bonilla

Results

22nd Legislative District Republican primary
| Party | Candidate | Votes | % |
|---|---|---|---|
| Republican | Joseph A. Bonilla | 2,331 | 100.0 |
| Total votes | | 2,331 | 100.0 |

==== General election ====
Endorsements

Nicholas Scutari (incumbent)

Organizations

- AFL–CIO of New Jersey
- American Federations of Teachers
- Firefighters Mutual Benevolent Association
- New Jersey Education Association PAC
- Planned Parenthood Action Fund of NJ

Results

22nd Legislative District general election
| Party | Candidate | Votes | % | ±% |
|---|---|---|---|---|
| Democratic | Nicholas P. Scutari (incumbent) | 29,563 | 67.3 | ▲7.8 |
| Republican | Joseph A. Bonilla | 14,362 | 32.7 | ▼7.8 |
| Total votes | | 43,925 | 100.0 | |
| Democratic hold | | | | |

=== District 23 ===
==== Republican primary ====
Declared

- Michael J. Doherty, incumbent senator

Results

23rd Legislative District Republican primary
| Party | Candidate | Votes | % |
|---|---|---|---|
| Republican | Michael J. Doherty | 10,748 | 100.0 |
| Total votes | | 10,748 | 100.0 |

==== Democratic primary ====
Declared

- Christine Lui Chen, health care executive

Results

23rd Legislative District Democratic primary
| Party | Candidate | Votes | % |
|---|---|---|---|
| Democratic | Christine Lui Chen | 7,745 | 100.0 |
| Total votes | | 7,745 | 100.0 |

==== General election ====
Endorsements

Christine Lui Chen

Organizations

- 314 Action
- AFL–CIO of New Jersey
- American Federations of Teachers
- New Jersey Education Association PAC
- PAM's List
- Planned Parenthood Action Fund of NJ
- Sierra Club of New Jersey

Results

23rd Legislative District general election
| Party | Candidate | Votes | % | ±% |
|---|---|---|---|---|
| Republican | Michael J. Doherty (incumbent) | 35,676 | 59.1 | ▼8.5 |
| Democratic | Christine Lui Chen | 24,730 | 40.9 | ▲9.7 |
| Total votes | | 60,406 | 100.0 | |
| Republican hold | | | | |

=== District 24 ===
==== Republican primary ====
Declared

- William Hayden, NJDOT employee and vice president of the Skylands Tea Party
- Steve Oroho, incumbent senator

Withdrawn

- Gail Phoebus, state assemblywoman

Results

24th Legislative District Republican primary
| Party | Candidate | Votes | % |
|---|---|---|---|
| Republican | Steven V. Oroho | 10,828 | 74.3 |
| Republican | William J. Hayden | 3,740 | 25.7 |
| Total votes | | 14,568 | 100.0 |

==== Democratic primary ====
Declared

- Jennifer Hamilton, attorney

Results

24th Legislative District Democratic primary
| Party | Candidate | Votes | % |
|---|---|---|---|
| Democratic | Jennifer Hamilton | 6,715 | 100.0 |
| Total votes | | 6,715 | 100.0 |

==== General election ====
Endorsements

Steve Oroho (incumbent)

Organizations

- Firefighters Mutual Benevolent Association
Jennifer Hamilton

Organizations

- AFL–CIO of New Jersey
- American Federations of Teachers
- New Jersey Education Association PAC
- NEW JOBS PAC
- PAM's List

Results

24th Legislative District general election
| Party | Candidate | Votes | % | ±% |
|---|---|---|---|---|
| Republican | Steven V. Oroho (incumbent) | 35,641 | 61.0 | ▼9.4 |
| Democratic | Jennifer Hamilton | 22,760 | 39.0 | ▲9.4 |
| Total votes | | 58,401 | 100.0 | |
| Republican hold | | | | |

=== District 25 ===
==== Republican primary ====
Declared

- Anthony Bucco, incumbent senator

Results

25th Legislative District Republican primary
| Party | Candidate | Votes | % |
|---|---|---|---|
| Republican | Anthony R. Bucco | 8,753 | 100.0 |
| Total votes | | 8,753 | 100.0 |

==== Democratic primary ====
Declared

- Lisa Bhimani, OB/GYN

Results

25th Legislative District Democratic primary
| Party | Candidate | Votes | % |
|---|---|---|---|
| Democratic | Lisa Bhimani | 8,596 | 100.0 |
| Total votes | | 8,596 | 100.0 |

==== General election ====
Endorsements

Anthony Bucco (incumbent)

Organizations

- NEW JOBS PAC
Lisa Bhimani

Organizations

- AFL–CIO of New Jersey
- American Federations of Teachers
- League of Conservation Voters
- New Jersey Education Association PAC
- PAM's List
- Planned Parenthood Action Fund of NJ
- Sierra Club of New Jersey
- Working Families Alliance

Results

25th Legislative District general election
| Party | Candidate | Votes | % | ±% |
|---|---|---|---|---|
| Republican | Anthony R. Bucco (incumbent) | 30,659 | 52.2 | ▼34.6 |
| Democratic | Lisa Bhimani | 28,131 | 47.8 | N/A |
| Total votes | | 58,790 | 100.0 | |
| Republican hold | | | | |

=== District 26 ===
==== Republican primary ====
Declared

- Joseph Pennacchio, incumbent senator

Declined

- Tom Mastrangelo, Morris County freeholder

Results

26th Legislative District Republican primary
| Party | Candidate | Votes | % |
|---|---|---|---|
| Republican | Joe Pennacchio | 10,378 | 100.0 |
| Total votes | | 10,378 | 100.0 |

==== Democratic primary ====
Declared

- Elliot Isibor, nominee for Assembly in 2011 and 2013

Results

26th Legislative District Democratic primary
| Party | Candidate | Votes | % |
|---|---|---|---|
| Democratic | Elliot Isibor | 7,445 | 100.0 |
| Total votes | | 7,445 | 100.0 |

==== General election ====
Endorsements

Joseph Pennacchio (incumbent)

Organizations

- NEW JOBS PAC
Elliot Isibor

Organizations

- American Federations of Teachers
- Sierra Club of New Jersey

Results

26th Legislative District general election
| Party | Candidate | Votes | % | ±% |
|---|---|---|---|---|
| Republican | Joe Pennacchio (incumbent) | 32,269 | 56.5 | ▼8.5 |
| Democratic | Elliot Isibor | 24,867 | 43.5 | ▲8.5 |
| Total votes | | 57,136 | 100.0 | |
| Republican hold | | | | |

=== District 27 ===
==== Democratic primary ====
Declared

- Richard Codey, incumbent senator

Results

27th Legislative District Democratic primary
| Party | Candidate | Votes | % |
|---|---|---|---|
| Democratic | Richard Codey | 15,144 | 100.0 |
| Total votes | | 15,144 | 100.0 |

==== Republican primary ====
Declared

- Pasquale "Pat" Capozzoli, Caldwell borough councilman

Results

27th Legislative District Republican primary
| Party | Candidate | Votes | % |
|---|---|---|---|
| Republican | Pasquale Capozzoli | 4,672 | 100.0 |
| Total votes | | 4,672 | 100.0 |

==== General election ====
Endorsements

Richard Codey (incumbent)

Organizations

- AFL–CIO of New Jersey
- American Federations of Teachers
- Firefighters Mutual Benevolent Association
- League of Conservation Voters
- New Jersey Education Association PAC
- NEW JOBS PAC
- Sierra Club of New Jersey
- Working Families Alliance

Results

27th Legislative District general election
| Party | Candidate | Votes | % | ±% |
|---|---|---|---|---|
| Democratic | Richard Codey (incumbent) | 43,066 | 69.7 | ▲10.4 |
| Republican | Pasquale Capozzoli | 18,720 | 30.3 | ▼10.4 |
| Total votes | | 61,786 | 100.0 | |
| Democratic hold | | | | |

=== District 28 ===
==== Democratic primary ====
Declared

- Ronald Rice, incumbent senator

Results

28th Legislative District Democratic primary
| Party | Candidate | Votes | % |
|---|---|---|---|
| Democratic | Ronald L. Rice | 12,090 | 100.0 |
| Total votes | | 12,090 | 100.0 |

==== Republican primary ====
No Republicans filed.

Results

28th Legislative District Republican primary
| Party | Candidate | Votes | % |
|---|---|---|---|
| Republican | Write-ins | 7 | 100.0 |
| Total votes | | 7 | 100.0 |

==== Independents and third parties ====
Declared

- Troy Knight-Napper (Green)

==== General election ====
Endorsements

Ronald L. Rice (incumbent)

Organizations

- AFL–CIO of New Jersey
- American Federations of Teachers
- Firefighters Mutual Benevolent Association
- New Jersey Education Association PAC
- NEW JOBS PAC

Results

28th Legislative District general election
| Party | Candidate | Votes | % | ±% |
|---|---|---|---|---|
| Democratic | Ronald L. Rice (incumbent) | 31,774 | 96.1 | ▲20.4 |
| Green | Troy Knight-Napper | 1,306 | 3.9 | N/A |
| Total votes | | 33,080 | 100.0 | |
| Democratic hold | | | | |

=== District 29 ===
==== Democratic primary ====
Declared

- Teresa Ruiz, incumbent senator

Results

29th Legislative District Democratic primary
| Party | Candidate | Votes | % |
|---|---|---|---|
| Democratic | M. Teresa Ruiz | 7,965 | 100.0 |
| Total votes | | 7,965 | 100.0 |

==== Republican primary ====
Declared

- Maria E. Lopez

Results

29th Legislative District Republican primary
| Party | Candidate | Votes | % |
|---|---|---|---|
| Republican | Maria E. Lopez | 509 | 100.0 |
| Total votes | | 509 | 100.0 |

==== Independents and third parties ====
Declared

- Pablo Olivera (One Nation Party), perennial candidate

==== General election ====
Endorsements

M. Teresa Ruiz (incumbent)

Organizations

- AFL–CIO of New Jersey
- American Federations of Teachers
- Firefighters Mutual Benevolent Association
- Latinas United for Political Empowerment
- NEW JOBS PAC
- PAM's List
- Planned Parenthood Action Fund of NJ

Results

29th Legislative District general election
| Party | Candidate | Votes | % | ±% |
|---|---|---|---|---|
| Democratic | M. Teresa Ruiz (incumbent) | 20,506 | 87.3 | ▲9.0 |
| Republican | Maria E. Lopez | 2,547 | 10.8 | ▼6.9 |
| One Nation | Pablo Olivera | 449 | 1.9 | ▼2.0 |
| Total votes | | 23,502 | 100.0 | |
| Democratic hold | | | | |

=== District 30 ===
==== Republican primary ====
Declared

- Robert Singer, incumbent senator

Results

30th Legislative District Republican primary
| Party | Candidate | Votes | % |
|---|---|---|---|
| Republican | Robert W. Singer | 8,507 | 100.0 |
| Total votes | | 8,507 | 100.0 |

==== Democratic primary ====
Declared

- Amy Sara Cores, attorney

Results

30th Legislative District Democratic primary
| Party | Candidate | Votes | % |
|---|---|---|---|
| Democratic | Amy Sara Cores | 4,862 | 100.0 |
| Total votes | | 4,862 | 100.0 |

==== General election ====
Endorsements

Robert Singer (incumbent)

Organizations

- NEW JOBS PAC
Amy Sara Cores

Organizations

- AFL–CIO of New Jersey
- American Federations of Teachers
- New Jersey Education Association PAC
- PAM's List

Results

30th Legislative District general election
| Party | Candidate | Votes | % | ±% |
|---|---|---|---|---|
| Republican | Robert W. Singer (incumbent) | 30,735 | 60.2 | ▼10.0 |
| Democratic | Amy Sara Cores | 20,343 | 39.8 | ▲10.0 |
| Total votes | | 51,078 | 100.0 | |
| Republican hold | | | | |

=== District 31 ===
==== Democratic primary ====
Declared

- Sandra Bolden Cunningham, incumbent senator

Declined

- Angela V. McKnight, state assemblywoman (running for re-election)

Results

31st Legislative District Democratic primary
| Party | Candidate | Votes | % |
|---|---|---|---|
| Democratic | Sandra B. Cunningham | 12,089 | 100.0 |
| Total votes | | 12,089 | 100.0 |

==== Republican primary ====
Declared

- Herminio Mendoza

Results

31st Legislative District Republican primary
| Party | Candidate | Votes | % |
|---|---|---|---|
| Republican | Herminio Mendoza | 665 | 100.0 |
| Total votes | | 665 | 100.0 |

==== General election ====
Endorsements

Sandra B. Cunningham (incumbent)

Organizations

- AFL–CIO of New Jersey
- American Federations of Teachers
- Firefighters Mutual Benevolent Association
- New Jersey Education Association PAC
- PAM's List
- Planned Parenthood Action Fund of NJ
- Working Families Alliance

Results

31st Legislative District general election
| Party | Candidate | Votes | % | ±% |
|---|---|---|---|---|
| Democratic | Sandra B. Cunningham (incumbent) | 25,437 | 83.9 | ▲10.8 |
| Republican | Herminio Mendoza | 4,874 | 16.1 | ▼10.8 |
| Total votes | | 30,311 | 100.0 | |
| Democratic hold | | | | |

=== District 32 ===
==== Democratic primary ====
Declared

- Nicholas Sacco, incumbent senator

Results

32nd Legislative District Democratic primary
| Party | Candidate | Votes | % |
|---|---|---|---|
| Democratic | Nicholas J. Sacco | 10,432 | 100.0 |
| Total votes | | 10,432 | 100.0 |

==== Republican primary ====
Declared

- Paul Castelli

Results

32nd Legislative District Republican primary
| Party | Candidate | Votes | % |
|---|---|---|---|
| Republican | Paul Castelli | 924 | 100.0 |
| Total votes | | 924 | 100.0 |

==== General election ====
Endorsements

Nicholas J. Sacco (incumbent)

Organizations

- AFL–CIO of New Jersey
- American Federations of Teachers
- Firefighters Mutual Benevolent Association
- New Jersey Education Association PAC

Results

32nd Legislative District general election
| Party | Candidate | Votes | % | ±% |
|---|---|---|---|---|
| Democratic | Nicholas J. Sacco (incumbent) | 23,736 | 80.2 | ▲10.0 |
| Republican | Paul Castelli | 5,842 | 19.8 | ▼10.0 |
| Total votes | | 29,578 | 100.0 | |
| Democratic hold | | | | |

=== District 33 ===
==== Democratic primary ====
Declared

- Brian P. Stack, incumbent senator

Results

33rd Legislative District Democratic primary
| Party | Candidate | Votes | % |
|---|---|---|---|
| Democratic | Brian P. Stack | 20,952 | 100.0 |
| Total votes | | 20,952 | 100.0 |

==== Republican primary ====
Declared

- Beth Hamburger

Results

33rd Legislative District Republican primary
| Party | Candidate | Votes | % |
|---|---|---|---|
| Republican | Beth Hamburger | 947 | 100.0 |
| Total votes | | 947 | 100.0 |

==== General election ====
Brian P. Stack (incumbent)

Organizations

- AFL–CIO of New Jersey
- American Federations of Teachers
- Firefighters Mutual Benevolent Association
- Working Families Alliance

Results

33rd Legislative District general election
| Party | Candidate | Votes | % | ±% |
|---|---|---|---|---|
| Democratic | Brian P. Stack (incumbent) | 36,594 | 88.2 | ▲7.5 |
| Republican | Beth Hamburger | 4,887 | 11.8 | ▼7.5 |
| Total votes | | 41,481 | 100.0 | |
| Democratic hold | | | | |

=== District 34 ===
==== Democratic primary ====
Declared

- Nia Gill, incumbent senator

Results

34th Legislative District Democratic primary
| Party | Candidate | Votes | % |
|---|---|---|---|
| Democratic | Nia H. Gill | 16,303 | 100.0 |
| Total votes | | 16,303 | 100.0 |

==== Republican primary ====
Declared

- Mahir Saleh

Results

34th Legislative District Republican primary
| Party | Candidate | Votes | % |
|---|---|---|---|
| Republican | Mahir Saleh | 1,044 | 100.0 |
| Total votes | | 1,044 | 100.0 |

==== General election ====
Endorsements

Nia H. Gill (incumbent)

Organizations

- AFL–CIO of New Jersey
- American Federations of Teachers
- Firefighters Mutual Benevolent Association
- New Jersey Education Association PAC
- PAM's List

Results

34th Legislative District general election
| Party | Candidate | Votes | % | ±% |
|---|---|---|---|---|
| Democratic | Nia H. Gill (incumbent) | 34,565 | 84.9 | ▲11.8 |
| Republican | Mahir Saleh | 6,136 | 15.1 | ▼11.8 |
| Total votes | | 40,701 | 100.0 | |
| Democratic hold | | | | |

=== District 35 ===
==== Democratic primary ====
Declared

- Nellie Pou, incumbent senator
- Haytham Younes, real estate investor and candidate for Paterson City Council in 2014

Results

35th Legislative District Democratic primary
| Party | Candidate | Votes | % |
|---|---|---|---|
| Democratic | Nelida Pou | 7,247 | 95.0 |
| Democratic | Haytham Younes | 385 | 5.0 |
| Total votes | | 7,632 | 100.0 |

==== Republican primary ====
Declared

- Marwan Sholakh

Results

35th Legislative District Republican primary
| Party | Candidate | Votes | % |
|---|---|---|---|
| Republican | Marwan Sholakh | 1,017 | 100.0 |
| Total votes | | 1,017 | 100.0 |

==== General election ====
Endorsements

Nelida Pou (incumbent)

Organizations

- AFL–CIO of New Jersey
- American Federations of Teachers
- Firefighters Mutual Benevolent Association
- Latinas United for Political Empowerment
- League of Conservation Voters
- New Jersey Education Association PAC
- NEW JOBS PAC
- PAM's List
- Planned Parenthood Action Fund of NJ
- Working Families Alliance

Results

35th Legislative District general election
| Party | Candidate | Votes | % | ±% |
|---|---|---|---|---|
| Democratic | Nelida Pou (incumbent) | 21,425 | 79.0 | ▲4.9 |
| Republican | Marwan Sholakh | 5,698 | 21.0 | ▼4.9 |
| Total votes | | 27,123 | 100.0 | |
| Democratic hold | | | | |

=== District 36 ===
==== Democratic primary ====
Declared

- Paul Sarlo, incumbent senator

Results

36th Legislative District Democratic primary
| Party | Candidate | Votes | % |
|---|---|---|---|
| Democratic | Paul A. Sarlo | 6,335 | 100.0 |
| Total votes | | 6,335 | 100.0 |

==== Republican primary ====
Declared

- Jeanine Ferrara

Results

36th Legislative District Republican primary
| Party | Candidate | Votes | % |
|---|---|---|---|
| Republican | Jeanine Ferrara | 1,978 | 100.0 |
| Total votes | | 1,978 | 100.0 |

==== General election ====
Endorsements

Paul A. Sarlo (incumbent)

Organizations

- AFL–CIO of New Jersey
- American Federations of Teachers
- Firefighters Mutual Benevolent Association
- New Jersey Education Association PAC
- NEW JOBS PAC

Results

36th Legislative District general election
| Party | Candidate | Votes | % | ±% |
|---|---|---|---|---|
| Democratic | Paul A. Sarlo (incumbent) | 24,044 | 65.8 | ▲6.1 |
| Republican | Jeanine Ferrara | 12,482 | 34.2 | ▼6.1 |
| Total votes | | 36,526 | 100.0 | |
| Democratic hold | | | | |

=== District 37 ===
==== Democratic primary ====
Declared

- Loretta Weinberg, incumbent senator

Results

37th Legislative District Democratic primary
| Party | Candidate | Votes | % |
|---|---|---|---|
| Democratic | Loretta Weinberg | 11,063 | 100.0 |
| Total votes | | 11,063 | 100.0 |

==== Republican primary ====
Declared

- Eric P. Fisher
- Modesto Romero

Results

37th Legislative District Republican primary
| Party | Candidate | Votes | % |
|---|---|---|---|
| Republican | Modesto Romero | 1,133 | 52.7 |
| Republican | Eric P. Fisher | 1,018 | 47.3 |
| Total votes | | 2,151 | 100.0 |

==== General election ====
Endorsements

Loretta Weinberg (incumbent)

Organizations

- AFL–CIO of New Jersey
- American Federations of Teachers
- Firefighters Mutual Benevolent Association
- League of Conservation Voters
- New Jersey Education Association PAC
- PAM's List
- Planned Parenthood Action Fund of NJ
- Sierra Club of New Jersey
- Working Families Alliance

Results

37th Legislative District general election
| Party | Candidate | Votes | % | ±% |
|---|---|---|---|---|
| Democratic | Loretta Weinberg (incumbent) | 33,017 | 75.4 | ▲6.9 |
| Republican | Modesto Romero | 10,788 | 24.6 | ▼6.9 |
| Total votes | | 43,805 | 100.0 | |
| Democratic hold | | | | |

=== District 38 ===
==== Democratic primary ====
Declared

- Robert M. Gordon, incumbent senator

Results

38th Legislative District Democratic primary
| Party | Candidate | Votes | % |
|---|---|---|---|
| Democratic | Bob Gordon | 7,551 | 100.0 |
| Total votes | | 7,551 | 100.0 |

==== Republican primary ====
Declared

- Kelly Langschultz, New Milford borough councilwoman

Declined

- John Cosgrove, mayor of Fair Lawn

Results

38th Legislative District Republican primary
| Party | Candidate | Votes | % |
|---|---|---|---|
| Republican | Kelly Langschultz | 4,245 | 100.0 |
| Total votes | | 4,245 | 100.0 |

==== General election ====
Endorsements

Bob Gordon (incumbent)

Individuals

- Matt Seymour, attorney and former Republican nominee for Assembly in 2017

Organizations

- AFL–CIO of New Jersey
- American Federations of Teachers
- Environment NJ
- Firefighters Mutual Benevolent Association
- League of Conservation Voters
- New Jersey Education Association PAC
- NEW JOBS PAC
- Planned Parenthood Action Fund of NJ
- Sierra Club of New Jersey
Kelly Langschultz

Organizations

- Republican State Leadership Committee

Results

38th Legislative District general election
| Party | Candidate | Votes | % | ±% |
|---|---|---|---|---|
| Democratic | Bob Gordon (incumbent) | 30,881 | 57.1 | ▲5.2 |
| Republican | Kelly Langschultz | 23,238 | 42.9 | ▼5.2 |
| Total votes | | 54,119 | 100.0 | |
| Democratic hold | | | | |

=== District 39 ===
==== Republican primary ====
Declared

- Gerald Cardinale, incumbent senator

Withdrawn

- John McCann, former Cresskill borough councilman

Results

39th Legislative District Republican primary
| Party | Candidate | Votes | % |
|---|---|---|---|
| Republican | Gerald Cardinale | 6,352 | 100.0 |
| Total votes | | 6,352 | 100.0 |

==== Democratic primary ====
Declared

- Linda Schwager, mayor of Oakland

Results

39th Legislative District Democratic primary
| Party | Candidate | Votes | % |
|---|---|---|---|
| Democratic | Linda H. Schwager | 6,831 | 100.0 |
| Total votes | | 6,831 | 100.0 |

==== Independents and third parties ====
Declared

- James Tosone (Libertarian)

==== General election ====
Endorsements

Gerald Cardinale (incumbent)

Organizations

- NEW JOBS PAC
Linda H. Schwager

U.S. senators

- Cory Booker, U.S. senator from New Jersey

Former state-level officials

- Howard Dean, former governor of Vermont and former chairman of the DNC

Organizations

- AFL–CIO of New Jersey
- American Federations of Teachers
- New Jersey Education Association PAC
- PAM's List
- Planned Parenthood Action Fund of NJ
- Police Benevolent Association of New Jersey
- Sierra Club of New Jersey

Results

39th Legislative District general election
| Party | Candidate | Votes | % | ±% |
|---|---|---|---|---|
| Republican | Gerald Cardinale (incumbent) | 33,752 | 52.8 | ▼10.8 |
| Democratic | Linda H. Schwager | 29,631 | 46.3 | ▲9.9 |
| Libertarian | James Tosone | 574 | 0.9 | N/A |
| Total votes | | 63,957 | 100.0 | |
| Republican hold | | | | |

=== District 40 ===
Incumbent Republican senator Kevin J. O'Toole announced on January 15, 2016, that he would not run for re-election. On March 13, 2017, he was confirmed by the state senate to the board of commissioners of The Port Authority of New York and New Jersey. O'Toole, however, did not immediately resign to accept the position, staying for the time being in his Senate seat to "tie up loose ends." He officially resigned his seat on July 1.

==== Republican primary ====
Declared

- Edward Buttimore, former investigator for the New Jersey Attorney General
- Kristin Corrado, Passaic County Clerk
- Paul DiGaetano, chairman of the Bergen County Republican Party and former state assemblyman (District 36)

Results

40th Legislative District Republican primary
| Party | Candidate | Votes | % |
|---|---|---|---|
| Republican | Kristin M. Corrado | 7,792 | 62.0 |
| Republican | Paul DiGaetano | 3,768 | 30.0 |
| Republican | Edward Buttimore | 1,005 | 8.0 |
| Total votes | | 12,565 | 100.0 |

Following O'Toole's resignation, Corrado was selected without opposition by local Republican committee members to serve the remainder of his term on July 26, and was sworn in on October 5.

==== Democratic primary ====
Declared

- Thomas Duch, Garfield City Manager

Results

40th Legislative District Democratic primary
| Party | Candidate | Votes | % |
|---|---|---|---|
| Democratic | Thomas Duch | 7,266 | 100.0 |
| Total votes | | 7,266 | 100.0 |

==== General election ====
Endorsements

Kristin Corrado (incumbent)

Organizations

- New Jersey Education Association PAC
- NEW JOBS PAC
Thomas Duch

U.S. representatives

- Bill Pascrell, U.S. representative from New Jersey's 9th congressional district

Organizations

- AFL–CIO of New Jersey
- American Federations of Teachers
- Planned Parenthood Action Fund of NJ
- Sierra Club of New Jersey
- United Auto Workers Region 9
- Working Families Alliance

Polling

| Poll source | Date(s) administered | Sample size | Margin of error | Kristin Corrado (R) | Thomas Duch (D) | Undecided |
|---|---|---|---|---|---|---|
| Public Policy Polling (D) | October 23 – 25, 2017 | 669 | ± 5.0% | 43% | 36% | 21% |

Results

40th Legislative District general election
| Party | Candidate | Votes | % | ±% |
|---|---|---|---|---|
| Republican | Kristin M. Corrado (incumbent) | 33,495 | 56.2 | ▼9.7 |
| Democratic | Thomas Duch | 26,060 | 43.8 | ▲9.7 |
| Total votes | | 59,555 | 100.0 | |
| Republican hold | | | | |

== See also ==
- 2017 New Jersey elections
- 2017 New Jersey General Assembly election
- List of New Jersey state legislatures
