= 2015 New Jersey elections =

- November 3, 2015

A general election was held in the U.S. state of New Jersey on November 3, 2015. Primary elections were held on June 2. The only state positions up in this election cycle were all 80 seats in the New Jersey General Assembly and one Senate special election in the 5th Legislative District. In addition to the State Legislative elections, numerous county offices and freeholders in addition to municipal offices, were up for election. There were no statewide ballot questions this year, though some counties and municipalities may have had a local question asked. Non-partisan local elections, some school board elections, and some fire district elections also happened throughout the year.

== State Legislature ==
The entire Senate is up in years ending in 1, 3, and 7; as there is no gubernatorial election coinciding with the years ending in 5 or 9 in this decade, the General Assembly races are the highest races listed on ballots for the first time since 1999. A very low turnout was expected due to the lack of Presidential, Congressional, or gubernatorial elections on the ballot this year. The predictions turned out to be true as the 22% turnout was the lowest percentage recorded in recent state history.

=== Senate ===
One special election was held in the 5th Legislative District to fill the remaining term of Donald Norcross, who resigned in November 2014 following his election to Congress. In December 2014, 5th District Democrats appointed former Assemblywoman Nilsa Cruz-Perez to the seat. Cruz-Perez was unopposed in the Democratic primary and faced no challengers in the special election. The Democratic Party holds a majority of seats in the Senate with 24 seats; the Republican Party holds 16 seats. The results of this election did not affect the standings of either party in the upper house.

5th Legislative District special senate election
| Party | Candidate | Votes | % |
|---|---|---|---|
| Democratic | Nilsa Cruz-Perez (incumbent) | 19,150 | 98.5 |
| Write-ins | Personal choice | 282 | 1.5 |
| Total votes | | 19,432 | 100.0 |
| Democratic hold | | | |

=== General Assembly ===
New Jersey General Assembly Elections, 2015
- November 3, 2015

All 80 seats in the New Jersey General Assembly 41 seats needed for a majority
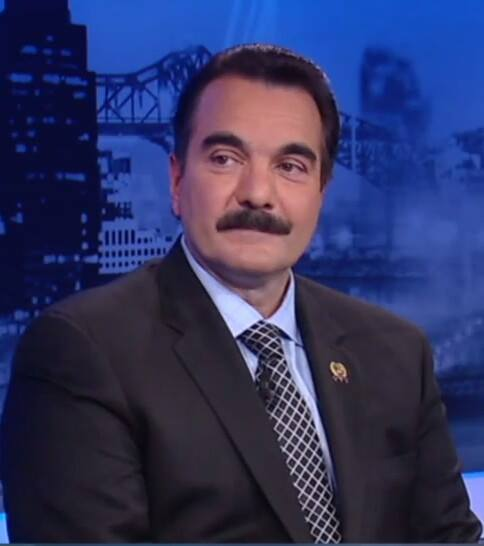
| | Majority party | Minority party |
|---|---|---|
| Leader | Vincent Prieto | Jon Bramnick |
| Party | Democratic | Republican |
| Leader since | January 14, 2014 | January 17, 2012 |
| Leader's seat | 32nd (Secaucus) | 21st (Westfield) |
| Last election | 48 | 32 |
| Seats won | 52 | 28 |
| Seat change | ▲4 | ▼4 |
| Popular vote | 1,111,320 | 958,085 |
| Percentage | 53.3% | 45.9% |
- Results: Democratic hold Democratic gain Republican hold
Speaker before election
Vincent Prieto
Democratic
Elected Speaker
Vincent Prieto
Democratic

All 80 seats in the General Assembly were up for election this year. In each Legislative district, there are two people elected; the top two winners in the general election are the ones sent to the Assembly. Typically, the two members of each party run as a team in each election. After the previous election, Democrats captured 48 seats while the Republicans won 32 seats. At the time of the general election, there were two vacancies: One in the 5th District resulting from Democrat Angel Fuentes's resignation on June 30, 2015, and one in the 24th District resulting from Republican Alison Littell McHose's resignation on October 17, 2015.

Ultimately four Democrats defeated four incumbent Republicans leading to the Democrats controlling 52 of 80 seats in the 2016–17 Assembly session, the highest percentage they held since 1979. Democrats flipped both seats in the 11th district, and one each in the 16th and the 1st.

==== Overall results ====
Summary of the November 3, 2015 New Jersey General Assembly election results:

↓
| 52 | 28 |
| Democratic | Republican |

| Parties | Candidates | Seats | | | | Popular Vote | | |
| Parties | Candidates | 2013 | 2015 | +/- | Strength | Vote | % | Change |
|---|---|---|---|---|---|---|---|---|
| Democratic | 78 | 48 | 52 | ▲4 | 65% | 1,111,320 | 53.3% | 0.0% |
| Republican | 79 | 32 | 28 | ▼4 | 35% | 958,085 | 45.9% | 0.0% |
| Green | 8 | 0 | 0 | Steady | 0% | 8,643 | 0.4% | 0.0% |
| Libertarian | 2 | 0 | 0 | Steady | 0% | 1,180 | 0.1% | 0.0% |
| Independent | 8 | 0 | 0 | Steady | 0% | 6,891 | 0.3% | 0.0% |
| Total | 175 | 80 | 80 | 0 | 100.0% | 2,086,119 | 100.0% | - |
