= New Jersey Libertarian Party =

State affiliate of the Libertarian Party

- Chairperson: Bruno Pereira
- Secretary: Jade Pao
- Ideology: Libertarianism
- National affiliation: Libertarian Party
- Colors: Gold
- New Jersey Senate: 0 / 40
- New Jersey House of Representatives: 0 / 80
- U.S. Senate (New Jersey): 0 / 2
- U.S. House of Representatives (New Jersey): 0 / 12
- Other elected officials: 1 (August 2025)

Website
- njlp.org

The New Jersey Libertarian Party (NJLP) is the affiliate of the Libertarian Party in New Jersey. The branch's chairman is Bruno Pereira. As of August 1, 2025, there were 24,026 people registered as Libertarians in the state. As of August 2, 2025, only one Libertarian, Caitlin Stratkus, holds office in the entire state.

== Chairs ==
- Bruno Pereira (2025–Present)
- Paul Baratelli (2023 - 2025)
- Patrick McKnight (~2016 -?)
- Robert (Rob) Steiner (October 6, 1972 -?)

== Candidate performances ==
=== Presidential ===
| Year | Candidate | Votes | Percentage |
|---|---|---|---|
| 1972 | John Hospers (Write-in) | 89 | 0.003% |
| 1976 | Roger MacBride | 9,449 | 0.3% |
| 1980 | Ed Clark | 20,652 | 0.7% |
| 1984 | David Bergland | 6,416 | 0.2% |
| 1988 | Ron Paul | 8,421 | 0.3% |
| 1992 | Andre Marrou | 6,822 | 0.2% |
| 1996 | Harry Browne | 14,763 | 0.5% |
| 2000 | Harry Browne | 6,312 | 0.2% |
| 2004 | Michael Badnarik | 4,514 | 0.1% |
| 2008 | Bob Barr | 8,441 | 0.2% |
| 2012 | Gary Johnson | 21,045 | 0.6% |
| 2016 | Gary Johnson | 72,477 | 1.9% |
| 2020 | Jo Jorgensen | 31,677 | 0.7% |
| 2024 | Chase Oliver | 10,500 | 0.25% |

=== Gubernatorial ===
| Year | Candidate | Votes | Percentage |
|---|---|---|---|
| 1973 | John A. Goodson | 3,071 | 0.14 |
| 1977 | Frank J. Primich | 5,674 | 0.27 |
| 1981 | Jack Moyers | 2,377 | 0.10 |
| 1985 | Virginia Flynn | 4,710 | 0.24 |
| 1989 | Daniel M. Karlan | 11,878 | 0.53 |
| 1993 | Kenneth R. Kaplan | 7,935 | 0.32 |
| 1997 | Murray Sabrin | 114,172 | 4.7 |
| 2001 | Mark Edgerton | 4,684 | 0.21 |
| 2005 | Jeffrey Pawlowski | 15,417 | 0.67 |
| 2009 | Kenneth R. Kaplan | 4,830 | 0.20 |
| 2013 | Kenneth R. Kaplan | 12,155 | 0.57 |
| 2017 | Pete Rohrman | 10,531 | 0.49 |
| 2021 | Gregg Mele | 7,768 | 0.30 |
| 2025 | Vic Kaplan | 11,880 | 0.36 |
