= Wenonah, New Jersey =

Borough in Gloucester County, New Jersey, US

- Borough
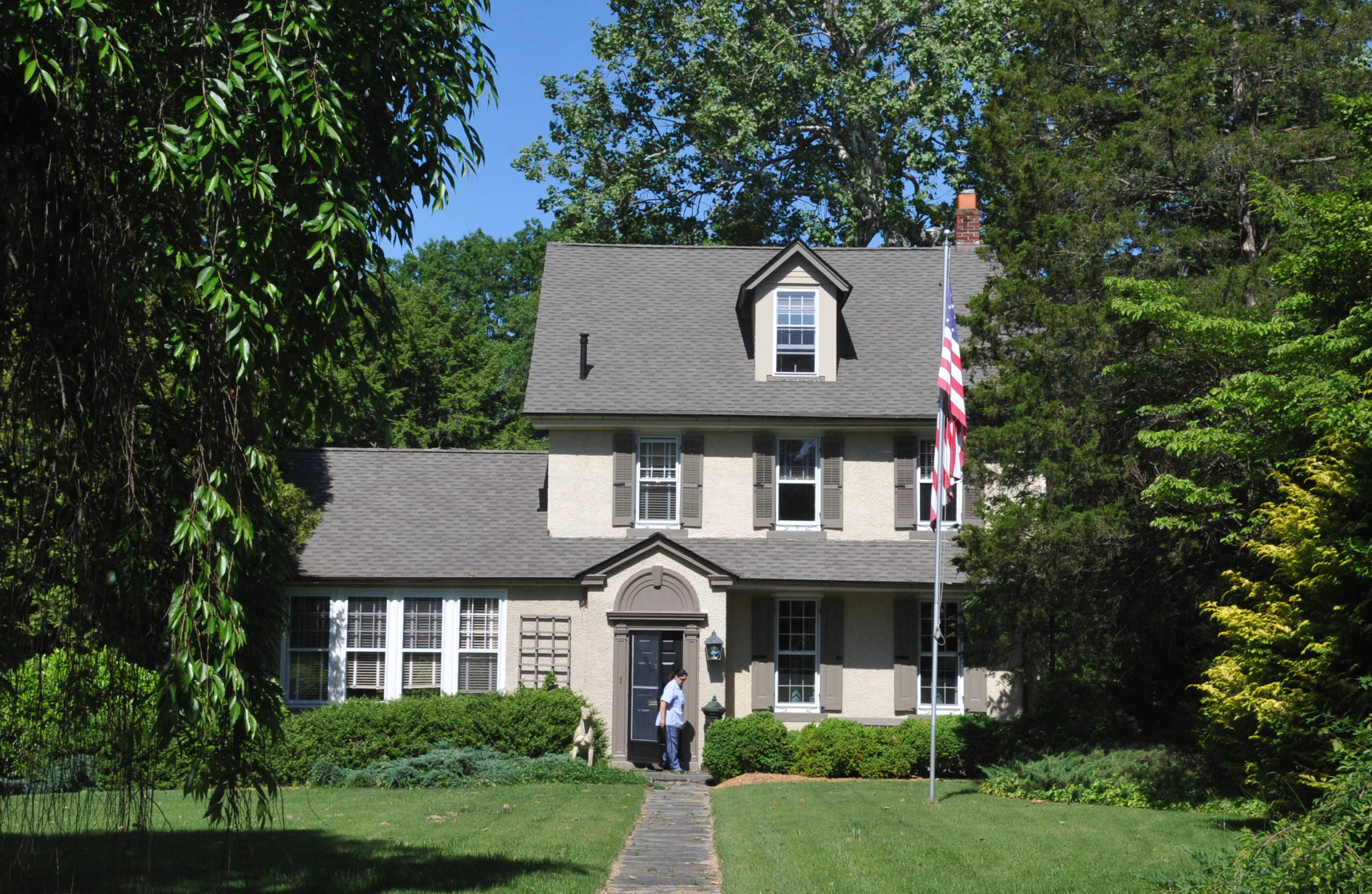
- Stone House Inn, built c. 1773

- Seal

- Map of Wenonah highlighted within Gloucester County. Inset: Location of Gloucester County in New Jersey.

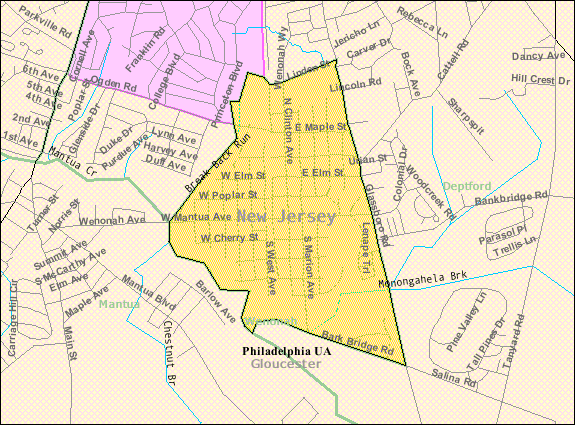
- Census Bureau map of Wenonah, New Jersey

- Location in Gloucester County Location in New Jersey Location in the United States
- Coordinates: 39.792001°N 75.148216°W
- Country: United States
- State: New Jersey
- County: Gloucester
- Incorporated: March 10, 1883

Government
  - Type: Borough
  - Body: Borough Council
  - Mayor: Jessica S. Doheny (D, term ends December 31, 2026)
  - Municipal clerk: Karen L. Sweeney

Area
  - Total: 1.01 sq mi (2.62 km^{2})
  - Land: 1.00 sq mi (2.58 km^{2})
  - Water: 0.015 sq mi (0.04 km^{2}) 1.58%
  - Rank: 498th of 565 in state 23rd of 24 in county
- Elevation: 69 ft (21 m)

Population (2020)
  - Total: 2,283
  - Estimate (2023): 2,309
  - Rank: 476th of 565 in state 23rd of 24 in county
  - Density: 2,293/sq mi (885/km^{2})
  - Rank: 272nd of 565 in state 9th of 24 in county
- Time zone: UTC−05:00 (Eastern (EST))
  - Summer (DST): UTC−04:00 (Eastern (EDT))
- ZIP Code: 08090
- Area code: 856 Exchanges: 415, 464, 468
- FIPS code: 3401578110
- GNIS feature ID: 0885434
- Website: www.boroughofwenonah.com

Wenonah is a borough in Gloucester County, in the U.S. state of New Jersey. As of the 2020 United States census, the borough's population was 2,283, an increase of five people (+0.2%) from the 2010 census count of 2,278, which in turn reflected a decline of 39 (−1.7%) from the 2,317 counted in the 2000 census. It is located approximately 10 miles (16 km) south of Philadelphia, the nation's sixth-most populous city.

Wenonah was established as a borough by the New Jersey Legislature on March 10, 1883, from portions of Deptford Township, based on the results of a referendum that was held two days earlier. The borough was named for the mother of Hiawatha in Henry Wadsworth Longfellow's poem The Song of Hiawatha.

It is a dry town where alcohol cannot be bought or sold legally.

The borough had the 29th-highest property tax rate in New Jersey, with an equalized rate of 4.120% in 2020, compared to 3.212% in the county as a whole and a statewide average of 2.279%.

== History ==
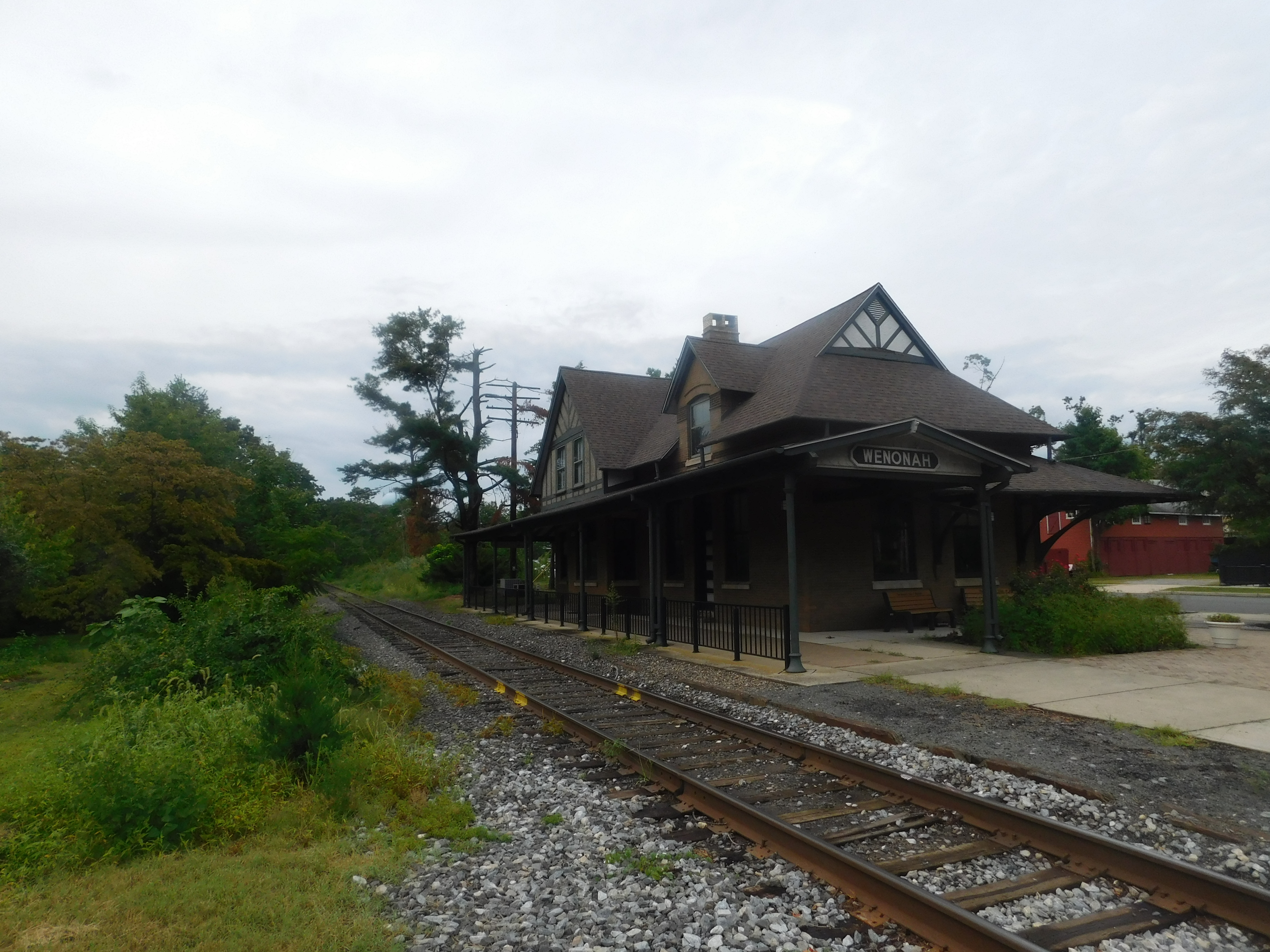
The former Pennsylvania Railroad station in Wenonah in August 2022

Wenonah was founded in 1871 by Philadelphia businessmen as a country resort, drawn by its location along the Mantua Creek and on the West Jersey Railroad. Over the next 40 years, numerous dams were installed to create recreational lakes. From 1902 until the Great Depression, Wenonah Military Academy, a private military school, trained cadets there.

Throughout its history, Wenonah has been almost exclusively a residential area. Over 21% of the borough's land area is conservation land, which is protected by ordinance from development. There are more than 6 miles (9.7 km) of hiking trails are threaded around lakes and alongside waterways in these conserved areas.

The area was hit by a strong EF3 tornado on September 1, 2021, with winds of up to 150 miles per hour (240 km/h), produced by the remnants of Hurricane Ida. More than 200 properties in Wenonah were damaged, the largest number of any municipality hit by the tornado.

== Geography ==
According to the U.S. Census Bureau, the borough had a total area of 1.01 square miles (2.62 km^{2}), including 1.00 square miles (2.58 km^{2}) of land and 0.02 square miles (0.04 km^{2}) of water (1.58%).

Wenonah borders Deptford Township and Mantua Township.

== Demographics ==
Historical population
Census	Pop.	Note	%±
1880	166		—
1890	383		130.7%
1900	498		30.0%
1910	645		29.5%
1920	918		42.3%
1930	1,245		35.6%
1940	1,311		5.3%
1950	1,511		15.3%
1960	2,100		39.0%
1970	2,364		12.6%
1980	2,303		−2.6%
1990	2,331		1.2%
2000	2,317		−0.6%
2010	2,278		−1.7%
2020	2,283		0.2%
2023 (est.)	2,309	▲	1.1%
Population sources: 1890–2000 1880–1890; 1890–1920 1890–1910; 1910–1930 1940–2000; 2000 2010 2020

=== 2020 census ===
As of the 2020 census, Wenonah had a population of 2,283. The median age was 45.9 years. 20.5% of residents were under the age of 18 and 19.6% of residents were 65 years of age or older. For every 100 females there were 97.2 males, and for every 100 females age 18 and over there were 95.6 males age 18 and over.

100.0% of residents lived in urban areas, while 0.0% lived in rural areas.

There were 845 households in Wenonah, of which 32.8% had children under the age of 18 living in them. Of all households, 61.9% were married-couple households, 13.5% were households with a male householder and no spouse or partner present, and 20.4% were households with a female householder and no spouse or partner present. About 19.1% of all households were made up of individuals and 10.5% had someone living alone who was 65 years of age or older.

There were 882 housing units, of which 4.2% were vacant. The homeowner vacancy rate was 2.2% and the rental vacancy rate was 6.1%.

Racial composition as of the 2020 census
Race	Number	Percent
White	2,098	91.9%
Black or African American	20	0.9%
American Indian and Alaska Native	4	0.2%
Asian	32	1.4%
Native Hawaiian and Other Pacific Islander	0	0.0%
Some other race	13	0.6%
Two or more races	116	5.1%
Hispanic or Latino (of any race)	71	3.1%

=== 2010 census ===
The 2010 United States census counted 2,278 people, 829 households, and 649 families in the borough. The population density was 2,342.8 inhabitants per square mile (904.6/km^{2}). There were 860 housing units at an average density of 884.4 per square mile (341.5/km^{2}). The racial makeup was 96.27% (2,193) White, 0.92% (21) Black or African American, 0.13% (3) Native American, 1.05% (24) Asian, 0.04% (1) Pacific Islander, 0.22% (5) from other races, and 1.36% (31) from two or more races. Hispanic or Latino of any race were 1.36% (31) of the population.

Of the 829 households, 33.9% had children under the age of 18; 66.3% were married couples living together; 9.4% had a female householder with no husband present and 21.7% were non-families. Of all households, 18.0% were made up of individuals and 6.3% had someone living alone who was 65 years of age or older. The average household size was 2.74 and the average family size was 3.13.

25.1% of the population were under the age of 18, 6.9% from 18 to 24, 21.6% from 25 to 44, 33.7% from 45 to 64, and 12.7% who were 65 years of age or older. The median age was 42.6 years. For every 100 females, the population had 103.4 males. For every 100 females ages 18 and older there were 98.0 males.

The Census Bureau's 2006–2010 American Community Survey showed that (in 2010 inflation-adjusted dollars) median household income was $103,403 (with a margin of error of +/− $8,030) and the median family income was $112,891 (+/− $12,345). Males had a median income of $78,417 (+/− $11,006) versus $64,205 (+/− $16,821) for females. The per capita income for the borough was $47,743 (+/− $6,172). About 1.1% of families and 1.4% of the population were below the poverty line, including 3.4% of those under age 18 and none of those age 65 or over.

=== 2000 census ===
As of the 2000 census, there were 2,317 people, 844 households, and 652 families residing in the borough. The population density was 2,380.3 inhabitants per square mile (919.0/km^{2}). There were 860 housing units at an average density of 883.5 per square mile (341.1/km^{2}). The racial makeup of the borough was 97.546% White, 1.084% African American, 0.093% Native American, 0.65% Asian, and 0.652% from two or more races. Hispanic or Latino of any race were 0.731% of the population.

There were 844 households, out of which 35.3% had children under the age of 18 living with them, 66.4% were married couples living together, 8.6% had a female householder with no husband present, and 22.7% were non-families. 19.7% of all households were made up of individuals, and 7.1% had someone living alone who was 65 years of age or older. The average household size was 2.70 and the average family size was 3.13.

In the borough, the population was spread out, with 25.9% under the age of 18, 5.1% from 18 to 24, 26.0% from 25 to 44, 29.1% from 45 to 64, and 13.8% who were 65 years of age or older. The median age was 41 years. For every 100 females, there were 94.9 males. For every 100 females age 18 and over, there were 93.0 males.

The median income for a household in the borough was $71,625, and the median income for a family was $82,505. Males had a median income of $57,381 versus $37,500 for females. The per capita income for the borough was $34,116. About 2.0% of families and 2.5% of the population were below the poverty line, including 2.8% of those under age 18 and 4.3% of those age 65 or over.

== Government ==
=== Local government ===
Wenonah is governed under the borough form of New Jersey municipal government, which is used in 218 of 564 municipalities statewide, making it the most common form of government in New Jersey. The governing body is comprised of a mayor and a borough council, with all positions elected at-large on a partisan basis as part of the November general election. A mayor is elected directly by the voters to a four-year term of office. The borough council includes six members elected to serve three-year terms on a staggered basis, with two seats coming up for election each year in a three-year cycle. The borough form of government used by Wenonah is a "weak mayor / strong council" government in which council members act as the legislative body with the mayor presiding at meetings and voting only in the event of a tie. The mayor can veto ordinances subject to an override by a two-thirds majority vote of the council. The mayor makes committee and liaison assignments for council members, and most appointments are made by the mayor with the advice and consent of the council.

As of 2025, Wenonah's mayor is Democrat Jessica S. Doheny, whose term of office ends December 31, 2026. Members of the Wenonah Borough Council are Council President Jaclyn Graves (D, 2025), Jonathan Barbato (D, 2026) Daniel Cox (D, 2027), Anthony J. Fini (D, 2026), Jeanne Grigri (D, 2025) and Alex Pozza (I, 2027).

In May 2016, the borough council selected Daniel Cox to fill the vacant seat expiring in December 2018 that had been held by John F. Howard until his death the previous month.

=== Federal, state, and county representation ===
Wenonah is located in the 1st Congressional District and is part of New Jersey's 3rd state legislative district.

For the 119th United States Congress, New Jersey's 1st congressional district is represented by Donald Norcross (D, Camden). New Jersey is represented in the United States Senate by Democrats Cory Booker (Newark, term ends 2027) and Andy Kim (Moorestown, term ends 2031).

For the 2026–2027 session, the 3rd legislative district of the New Jersey Legislature is represented in the State Senate by John Burzichelli (D, Paulsboro) and in the General Assembly by David Bailey (D, Woodstown) and Heather Simmons (D, Glassboro).

Gloucester County is governed by a board of county commissioners, whose seven members are elected at-large to three-year terms of office on a staggered basis in partisan elections, with either two or three seats coming up for election each year. At a reorganization meeting held each January, the Board selects a Director and a Deputy Director from among its members. As of 2025, Gloucester County's Commissioners are:

Director Frank J. DiMarco (D, Deptford Township, 2025), Matt Weng (D, Pitman, 2026), Joann Gattinelli (D, Washington Township, 2026), Nicholas DeSilvio (R, Franklin Township, 2027), Denice DiCarlo (D, West Deptford Township, 2025) Deputy Director Jim Jefferson (D, Woodbury, 2026) and Christopher Konawel Jr. (R, Glassboro, 2027).

Gloucester County's constitutional officers are: Clerk James N. Hogan (D, Franklin Township; 2027), Sheriff Carmel Morina (D, Greenwich Township; 2027) and Surrogate Giuseppe "Joe" Chila (D, Woolwich Township; 2028).

=== Politics ===
United States presidential election results for Wenonah 2024 2020 2016 2012 2008 2004
Year	Republican		Democratic		Third party(ies)	
Year	No.	%	No.	%	No.	%
2024	536	35.76%	930	62.04%	33	2.20%
2020	569	35.43%	1,002	62.39%	35	2.18%
2016	525	38.49%	762	55.87%	77	5.65%
2012	619	45.12%	727	52.99%	26	1.90%
2008	647	44.90%	775	53.78%	19	1.32%
2004	688	48.18%	715	50.07%	25	1.75%

As of March 2011, there were a total of 1,748 registered voters in Wenonah, of which 571 (32.7%) were registered as Democrats, 461 (26.4%) were registered as Republicans and 714 (40.8%) were registered as Unaffiliated. There were 2 voters registered as either Libertarians or Greens.

In the 2012 presidential election, Democrat Barack Obama received 53.0% of the vote (727 cast), ahead of Republican Mitt Romney with 45.1% (619 votes), and other candidates with 1.9% (26 votes), among the 1,383 ballots cast by the borough's 1,780 registered voters (11 ballots were spoiled), for a turnout of 77.7%. In the 2008 presidential election, Democrat Barack Obama received 53.3% of the vote (775 cast), ahead of Republican John McCain with 44.5% (647 votes) and other candidates with 1.3% (19 votes), among the 1,455 ballots cast by the borough's 1,786 registered voters, for a turnout of 81.5%. In the 2004 presidential election, Democrat John Kerry received 49.8% of the vote (715 ballots cast), outpolling Republican George W. Bush with 47.9% (688 votes) and other candidates with 1.4% (25 votes), among the 1,436 ballots cast by the borough's 1,769 registered voters, for a turnout percentage of 81.2.

Gubernatorial election results for Wenonah
Year	Republican		Democratic		Third party(ies)	
Year	No.	%	No.	%	No.	%
2025	452	35.79%	797	63.10%	14	1.11%
2021	439	43.08%	565	55.45%	15	1.47%
2017	403	42.07%	533	55.64%	22	2.30%
2013	563	61.13%	334	36.26%	24	2.61%
2009	469	44.97%	436	41.80%	138	13.23%
2005	499	47.43%	498	47.34%	55	5.23%

In the 2013 gubernatorial election, Republican Chris Christie received 61.1% of the vote (563 cast), ahead of Democrat Barbara Buono with 36.3% (334 votes), and other candidates with 2.6% (24 votes), among the 933 ballots cast by the borough's 1,748 registered voters (12 ballots were spoiled), for a turnout of 53.4%. In the 2009 gubernatorial election, Republican Chris Christie received 44.3% of the vote (469 ballots cast), ahead of Democrat Jon Corzine with 41.2% (436 votes), Independent Chris Daggett with 12.3% (130 votes) and other candidates with 0.8% (8 votes), among the 1,059 ballots cast by the borough's 1,775 registered voters, yielding a 59.7% turnout.

United States Senate election results for Wenonah1
Year	Republican		Democratic		Third party(ies)	
Year	No.	%	No.	%	No.	%
2024	534	36.23%	908	61.60%	32	2.17%
2018	534	43.70%	627	51.31%	61	4.99%
2012	579	43.14%	696	51.86%	67	4.99%
2006	577	48.82%	570	48.22%	35	2.96%

United States Senate election results for Wenonah2
Year	Republican		Democratic		Third party(ies)	
Year	No.	%	No.	%	No.	%
2020	615	38.37%	941	58.70%	47	2.93%
2014	429	46.73%	462	50.33%	27	2.94%
2013	244	47.01%	267	51.45%	8	1.54%
2008	638	46.67%	687	50.26%	42	3.07%

== Education ==
Wenonah School District serves public school students in kindergarten through sixth grade at Wenonah Elementary School. As of the 2023–24 school year, the district, comprised of one school, had an enrollment of 163 students and 19.5 classroom teachers (on an FTE basis), for a student–teacher ratio of 8.4:1. In the 2016–17 school year, Wenonah had the 37th smallest enrollment of any school district in the state, with 177 students.

For seventh through twelfth grades, public school students attend Gateway Regional High School, a regional public high school that also serves students from the boroughs of National Park, Westville and Woodbury Heights, as part of the Gateway Regional High School District. As of the 2023–24 school year, the high school had an enrollment of 875 students and 82.2 classroom teachers (on an FTE basis), for a student–teacher ratio of 10.6:1.

Students from across the county are eligible to apply to attend Gloucester County Institute of Technology, a four-year high school in Deptford Township that provides technical and vocational education. As a public school, students do not pay tuition to attend the school.

== Transportation ==
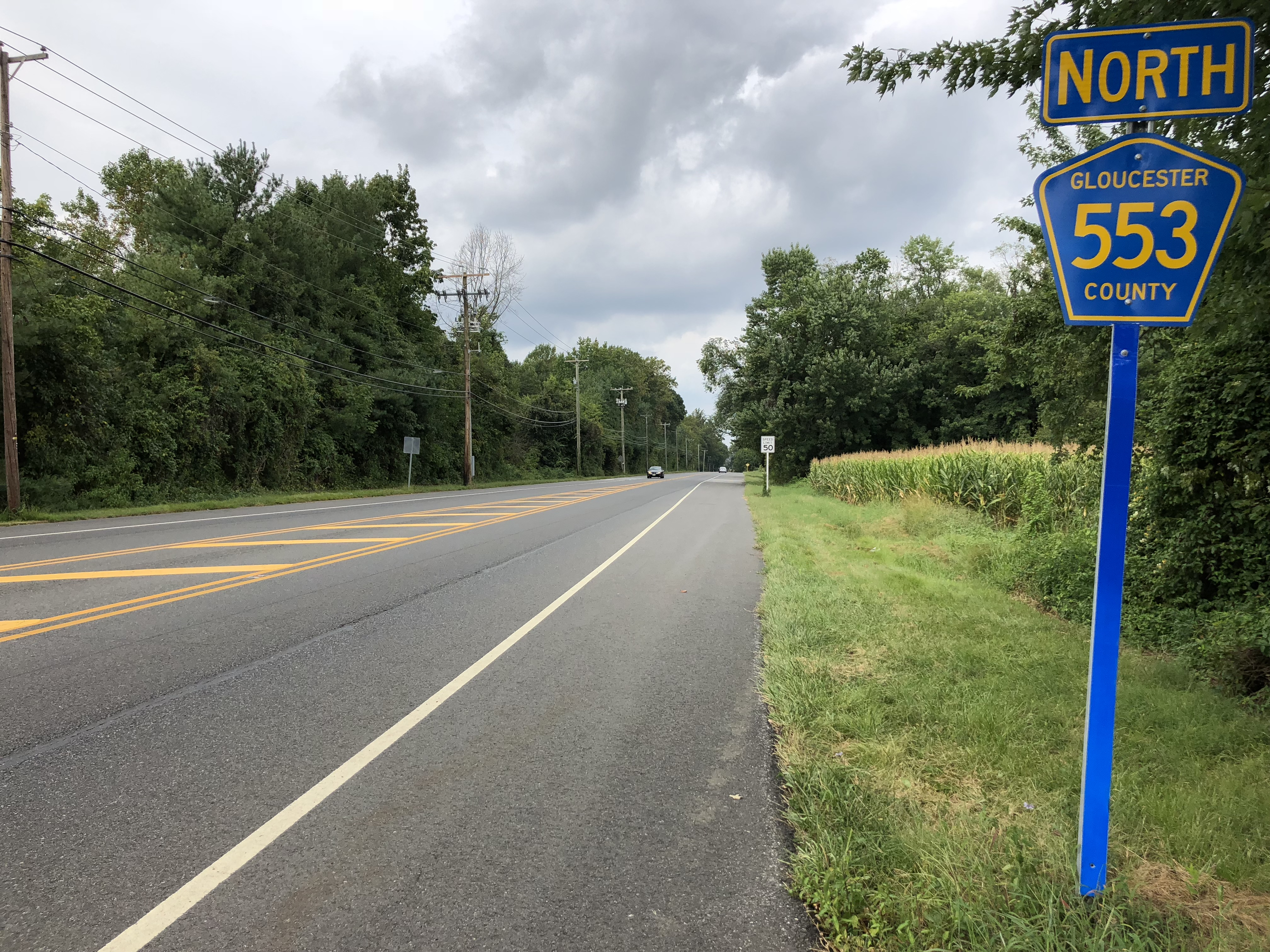
County Route 553 northbound along Wenonah's eastern border

=== Roads and highways ===
As of May 2010, the borough had a total of 15.42 miles (24.82 km) of roadways, of which 13.63 miles (21.94 km) were maintained by the municipality and 1.79 miles (2.88 km) by Gloucester County.

County Route 553 and County Route 632 are the main roadways serving Wenonah.

=== Public transportation ===
NJ Transit bus service between Sewell and Philadelphia is available on the 412 route.

The borough is the site of a planned stop on the Glassboro–Camden Line, an 18-mile (28.97 km) diesel multiple unit light rail system projected for completion in 2019. However, as of 2019, completion is not expected until 2025.

== Notable people ==
People who were born in, residents of, or otherwise closely associated with Wenonah include:

- B.C. Camplight (born 1979, as Brian Christinzio), singer-songwriter
- Michael Capuzzo (born 1957), author of Close to Shore: A True Story of Terror in an Age of Innocence and four-time Pulitzer Prize nominee
- Ethel A. Grosscup (1891–1949), physical educator and child health consultant
- Edward Everett Grosscup (1860–1933), chairman of the New Jersey Democratic State Committee from 1911 to 1919 and Treasurer of the State of New Jersey from 1913 to 1915
- Carl Hausman (born 1953), journalist, educator and commentator, who is the author of Lies We Live By
- Isaac Pursell (1853–1910), architect
- Grover C. Richman Jr. (1911–1983), lawyer who served as United States Attorney for the District of New Jersey from 1951 to 1953 and New Jersey Attorney General from 1954 to 1958
- Joseph C. Salema, New Jersey Governor James Florio's former chief of staff who resigned in the spring of 1993 amid accusations of accepting payments in a pay to play scandal
- Joe Solecki (born 1993), professional mixed martial artist competing for the Ultimate Fighting Championship
- Steve Squyres (born 1957), astronomer and principal investigator of the Mars Exploration Rover Mission
- Tim Squyres (born 1959), film editor of Crouching Tiger, Hidden Dragon, Hulk, Life of Pi and Syriana, among others
- Bob Steuber (1921–1996), NFL football player who was elected to the College Football Hall of Fame in 1971
