= John McCormac =

American politician (born 1958)

John E. McCormac
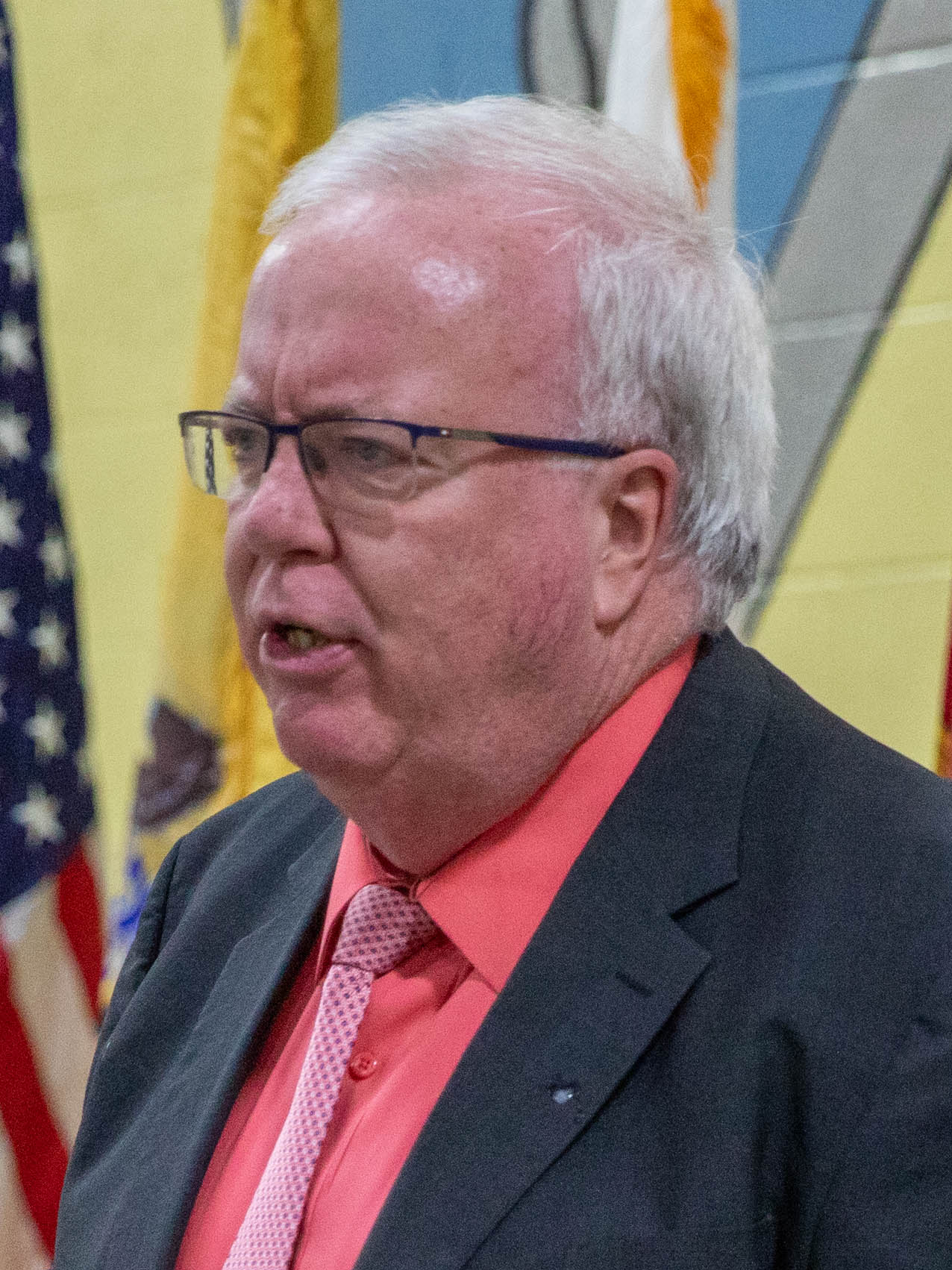

21st Mayor of Woodbridge Township
- Incumbent
- Assumed office November 13, 2006
- Preceded by: Joe Vitale

Treasurer of New Jersey
- In office January 2002 – January 2006
- Governor: Jim McGreevey; Richard Codey
- Preceded by: Peter Lawrance
- Succeeded by: Bradley Abelow

Personal details
- Born: 1958 (age 67–68) Woodbridge, New Jersey, U.S.
- Party: Democratic
- Education: Rutgers University (BA); St. John's University (MS)

John E. McCormac is an American Democratic Party politician, who is serving as the Mayor of Woodbridge Township, New Jersey. He served as State Treasurer of New Jersey for four years in the cabinets of former Governor of New Jersey James McGreevey and former Gov. Richard Codey.

== Biography ==
McCormac was born and raised in Woodbridge. He attended St. Cecelia's grammar school in Iselin and graduated from St. Thomas Aquinas High School in 1976. He earned a BA in accounting from Rutgers University and a master's degree in finance from St. John's University.

McCormac had served as chief financial officer and business administrator of Woodbridge Township, during McGreevey's tenure as Mayor of the Township. When McGreevey became governor, he named McCormac to the treasurer's job. Codey, who succeeded McGreevey in November 2004, retained McCormac in the post for his administration.

After leaving the treasurer's office in January 2006, McCormac announced his intention to seek the Democratic nomination for Mayor of Woodbridge in the 2007 election. He was planning on opposing Mayor Frank Pelzman in the Democratic primary. Pelzman's unexpected June 2006 death triggered a November 2006 special election where McCormac won; he was sworn in on November 13, 2006, and has held the post ever since; State Senator Joseph Vitale was appointed to serve as mayor until the special election winner was sworn in. McCormac is a member of the Mayors Against Illegal Guns Coalition.

Political offices
Preceded by Peter Lawrance	Treasurer of New Jersey; 2002 – 2006	Succeeded by Bradley Abelow
Preceded by Joseph Vitale	Mayor of Woodbridge Township, New Jersey; November 13, 2006 – Present	Succeeded by Incumbent
