= Clarence Lushbaugh =

American physician and pathologist

- Born: Clarence Chancelum Lushbaugh, Jr. March 15, 1916; Covington, Kentucky, US
- Died: October 13, 2000 (aged 84); Oak Ridge, Tennessee, US
- Education: University of Chicago
- Spouse: Mary Helen Chisolm (1942–1963) Dorothy Bess Hale (1963–2000, his death)
- Children: 3
- Scientific career
- Fields: Pathology, radiology
- Workplaces: University of Chicago Los Alamos National Laboratory Oak Ridge Associated Universities
- Thesis: The Effect of Alcoholic Intoxication Upon Acquired Resistance to Pneumococcal Infection in Rabbits
- Academic advisors: Franklin C. McLean

Clarence Chancelum Lushbaugh Jr. (March 15, 1916 – October 13, 2000) was an American physician and pathologist. He was considered an expert in radiological accidents and injuries, as well as a pioneer in radiation safety research, and he is known for his controversial research involving human subjects.

Lushbaugh started his career in 1939 as a professor in the Department of Pathology at the University of Chicago, while he was working towards his Ph.D. His early medical research was directed by the onset of World War II, and resulted in the discovery of the chemotherapeutic potential of compounds being tested as chemical weapons. After completing his medical degree from the school in 1948, he joined the Los Alamos National Laboratory as a pathologist, and began to develop expertise applying the science to victims of radiological accidents.

What became known as the Los Alamos Human Tissue Analysis Program began in 1958 after Lushbaugh performed an autopsy on the body of Cecil Kelley, who died of radiation-induced heart failure following a criticality accident at Los Alamos. Lushbaugh identified an opportunity to analyze Kelley's remains to confirm or improve Los Alamos safety procedures concerning radiation exposure. To this end, Lushbaugh extracted some of the irradiated organs and tissues from Kelley for analysis, eventuating the development of safer radiation exposure limits. Lushbaugh had taken these organs and tissues from Kelley without permission from Kelley's nearest of kin. The propriety of the removal of Kelley's organs was eventually called into question, and his daughter filed a successful lawsuit against Lushbaugh and Los Alamos in 1996.

Lushbaugh's career continued at the Medical and Health Sciences Division of Oak Ridge Associated Universities, where he was brought on to lead several scientific endeavors, most notably the Total Body Irradiation Program, an experimental program designed to determine the limits at which exposure to radiation would begin to cause radiation sickness. Though the goals of the program were to improve radiation safety protocols, they became controversial because the test subjects did not know they were being subjected to the radiation, which was administered in specialized chambers disguised as waiting rooms. Lushbaugh became Chairman of the Division and helped found the Radiation Emergency Assistance Center/Training Site (REAC/TS), an organization that serves as a major emergency response consultant for the Department of Energy.

== Early life and education ==
Clarence Chancelum Lushbaugh Jr. was born on March 15, 1916, in Covington, Kentucky. His father, Clarence Lushbaugh Sr., was a railroad freight worker who died after contracting the Spanish flu in 1918. Lushbaugh attended Walnut Hills High School in Cincinnati, Ohio, near where he grew up. As a child, he was an excellent student, and was elected class president during his senior year, beating out fellow student and future colleague Eugene Saenger. He was also an avid participant in the Boy Scouts of America, earning his Eagle Scout rank on September 27, 1932, with Troop 102 in Cincinnati, Ohio.

He enrolled at the University of Cincinnati, where he studied for three years before moving in 1937 to the University of Chicago, finishing his bachelor's degree in anatomy in 1938.

== Academic career ==
After graduation, he was given a fellowship at the University of Chicago medical school, though at the time was undecided regarding the pursuit of a medical degree. He instead pursued a Ph.D. in experimental pathology, and as a fellow also worked as an instructor and assistant professor in the Department of Pathology.

During the course of his graduate studies at the University of Chicago medical school, he worked closely with Paul Steiner, a professor in the Department of Pathology. The two published the results of a study in which they describe the condition of amniotic fluid embolism based on a case study of eight autopsies of pregnant women who died suddenly during childbirth. Though the complication was originally described in 1926 by J. R. Meyer at the University of São Paulo, Lushbaugh and Steiner's 1941 report was considered a landmark publication that enabled widespread recognition of the diagnosis within the medical community. It was eventually republished as such in the Journal of the American Medical Association.

Lushbaugh completed his doctoral program in 1942. His thesis, titled The Effect of Alcoholic Intoxication Upon Acquired Resistance to Pneumococcal Infection in Rabbits, was published the following year in the Journal of Immunology. Following this, he joined the faculty of the university as a pathologist and pathology professor. During World War II, his research efforts were structured by the war effort, and he worked within the university's toxicology laboratory, researching nerve agents for use as chemical weapons in the war effort, research which employed various animals as test subjects. With his advisor Franklin C. McLean, he explored the use of nitrogen mustards for this purpose, later determining that their lymphotoxic properties had potential chemotherapeutic applications. He received credit on a study that explored these applications with human test subjects.

As a fellow of pathology, Lushbaugh was afforded his own laboratory at the university, though his zeal for his research projects at times proved enough to outspend his resources. Former research assistant John B. Storer recalled:

I worked part-time in Lush's laboratory while I was in medical school and returned full-time as a Fellow after my internship. We worked vigorously and with great enthusiasm on a variety of research projects. In fact, our enthusiasm was so great that one day the department chairman discovered that we had taken over all the department's animal rooms except one and had also occupied an animal room that belonged to the Department of Surgery. We rapidly retrenched.

Lushbaugh returned to his studies and finished his M.D. in 1948, having come to the conclusion his lack of formal medical education would negatively impact his ability to conduct clinical research.

== Los Alamos National Laboratory ==
Lushbaugh left the University of Chicago in 1949 to join the Medical Center of the Los Alamos National Laboratory as a pathologist. The job had been offered to him by Franklin McLean, and involved both research work in Los Alamos Biomedical Research Group, as well as clinical work at the Los Alamos Medical Center. Pursuant to this clinical requirement, he applied and took the exam for a medical license in New Mexico. He passed the American Medical Association's scientific examination, and, though he had completed no formal residency, he was given credit for part of his tenure at the University of Chicago as medical practice and received a medical license.

During his stay in Los Alamos, he served from 1950 to 1958 as the Assistant District Health Officer for Los Alamos County.

=== Los Alamos Human Tissue Analysis Program ===
On December 30, 1958, at the Los Alamos laboratory, 38-year-old chemical operator Cecil Kelley was involved in a criticality accident in which he absorbed 36 gray of ionizing radiation from a mixing tank containing highly concentrated plutonium-239. He died 35 hours after this exposure from heart failure caused by the radiation he absorbed. After his death, his body was sent to Lushbaugh at the Los Alamos Medical Center for autopsy. Lushbaugh had worked with radiological injuries in the past, but Kelley's autopsy presented an opportunity that none before it had. Previously, safety assessments regarding radiation exposure had been reached based on predictive interpretations of urine tests. As an employee of Los Alamos directly involved in the handling of radioactive materials, Kelley had given urine samples before he died, and now with his autopsy and the circumstances that preceded it, Lushbaugh identified a unique opportunity to confirm the validity of those tests and associated exposure limits, as well as ascertain the distribution of plutonium throughout the organs and skeleton. Though it was considered acceptable to take samples during an autopsy to confirm diagnoses or cause of death, Lushbaugh proceeded during the Kelley autopsy to remove more than eight pounds (3.6 kg) of organs from the body, including the brain and spinal cord, which he placed into empty glass mayonnaise jars for transport back to the biomedical lab.

The results of the examination of Kelley's tissue proved to be fruitful; while the urine tests were found to be accurate in their prediction of whole-body plutonium content, analysis of the organs found that the conventional models of where in the body the element would settle and accumulate were inaccurate. High concentrations of plutonium were found in Kelley's lungs and lymph nodes, and less in his liver and bone marrow. So significant were these findings that Lushbaugh sent the samples from Kelley's body to other labs around the country so that they could independently verify the findings. He also made this type of tissue removal part of the standard procedure for autopsies at Los Alamos, for both employees and non-employees, the latter of whom would act as a control group. This decision marked the beginning of the Los Alamos Human Tissue Analysis Program.

To this end, when the next-of-kin was asked to authorize an autopsy at Los Alamos, a provision was included in the form to allow, at the discretion of the examining physician, the removal of tissues and other specimens for research purposes. The explicit intention to use these tissues in the experimental program, however, was not revealed to those who signed the authorization. Additionally, most deaths that did not occur within the Los Alamos Medical Center fell under the authority of the coroner, who would be able to authorize the tissue removal without any involvement or awareness from the next-of-kin. In his capacity as the Assistant District Health Officer for Los Alamos County, however, Lushbaugh was himself the de facto county coroner. The program would last until 1978 – the first twelve years operating entirely from the Los Alamos Medical Center under Lushbaugh's purview.

In 1996, after discovering the fate of her father's remains through a series of information requests to Los Alamos, Katie Kelley Mareau, Cecil Kelley's daughter, initiated a class-action lawsuit against the Los Alamos Medical Center, the University of California (who ran the laboratory), and Lushbaugh individually. The Los Alamos Medical Center and the university settled five years later in 2001, but Lushbaugh neither settled nor conceded any wrongdoing. During a deposition, he was asked who gave him permission to extract the organs from Cecil Kelley's body. He replied, "God gave me permission".

=== SL-1 reactor accident ===
Throughout the 1950s during his career at Los Alamos, Lushbaugh had built a reputation as an expert on radiological pathology, specifically concerning the investigation of nuclear accidents. In this capacity, he was called in 1961 to the National Reactor Testing Station in Idaho Falls, Idaho, to aid in the investigation of the accident in the SL-1 experimental nuclear power reactor that had resulted in the deaths of its three operators. Because of the nature of the reactor accident, the bodies of all three men contained fragments of nuclear fuel from the reactor core and were thus extremely radioactive. Lushbaugh was called to perform the autopsy of the men, but because of the radioactivity of the remains, could not be in the same room as them to do so. In order to perform any significant degree of analysis, he and his team elected to remove the most radioactive parts of the bodies. To do this, he used a hacksaw blade that had been welded to a ten-foot (3.0 m) length of pipe, which he maneuvered from outside of the room. These pieces were sealed in steel drums and buried underground with concrete as radioactive waste in the desert near the reactor.

== Oak Ridge National Laboratory ==
In 1963, shortly after his divorce from his first wife, Lushbaugh left the Los Alamos Laboratory to move to Oak Ridge, Tennessee, to join the Oak Ridge Institute of Nuclear Studies as the Chief Scientist of the Medical and Health Sciences Division. He would cite his divorce as part of the reason for the move, but the largest influence was the opportunity to continue his work with living subjects, whereas in Los Alamos he was limited to working with the deceased.

=== Total Body Irradiation Program ===
At Oak Ridge, Lushbaugh became involved in research at the behest of NASA and the Atomic Energy Commission (AEC) designed to ascertain the point at which exposure to radiation would begin to cause acute radiation sickness. Starting in 1960 and continuing until 1974, around 89 patients who were admitted to the Medical and Health Sciences Division clinic for cancer treatment were directly exposed to high levels of ionizing radiation as human test subjects. Lushbaugh was brought on in 1964, along with hematologist Gould Andrews, to lead the project.

The exposure was conducted in one of two custom-built radiation therapy chambers: the Medium-Exposure-Rate Total-Body Irradiator (METBI), which was originally designed for administering spray irradiation treatment for rare blood cancers, and the Low-Exposure-Rate Total-Body Irradiator (LETBI), which was custom-built for this project and administered lower doses over a longer period of time, and was also disguised to look like a normal waiting room. All of these procedures were performed under the guise of cancer treatment, which the patients had been referred to the clinic for, and the nature of the experiment was not divulged to them or their family members.

After the conclusion of the experiments, an AEC review board questioned their propriety, empirical value, and actual benefit to the patients who unwittingly participated in the program. In a later interview Lushbaugh would propose several instances of positive outcomes from individuals in the programs, and a colleague said that the procedures under the purview of his experiments were still customized to the specific condition of each patient. He also later stated that he was not directly responsible for selecting which patients referred to the clinic would be placed in the experiment, though it was attested by several others that he was among the senior staff that formed the committee which made such decisions. The controversy did not hinder his activities, however, as in the year following the conclusion of the study, he would be promoted and would continue his research into radiation exposure. Of the controversy, he quipped, "Only God can retire me".

=== Chairmanship and REAC/TS ===
In 1975, Lushbaugh became the Chairman of the Medical and Health Sciences Division and was also promoted to Chief of Radiation Medicine. He was involved around this time in the establishment of the Radiation Emergency Assistance Center/Training Site, a facility at Oak Ridge that oversaw emergency care and treatment of patients following radiation exposure accidents. He served as its first director from 1976 to 1977. The facility became a major resource for education and emergency response coordination concerning radiological accidents, and is a key consulting body for the National Nuclear Security Administration, part of the Department of Energy.

Lushbaugh left Oak Ridge National Laboratory in 1984.

== Other activities ==
Lushbaugh was a prolific researcher, and throughout his career his name appeared on over 150 scientific publications. From 1961 to 1971, he was an associate editor for Radiation Research, an academic journal of the Radiation Research Society. Additionally, he was a founding member of and served on the Plutonium Registry Advisory Committee from 1968 to 1982.

Lushbaugh returned to academia in 1980, joining the faculty of the School of Public Health at the University of North Carolina at Chapel Hill as an adjunct professor of epidemiology.

During the Chernobyl reactor accident in 1986, he was one of several radiation experts whose counsel was requested by the United States government. He traveled to the Soviet Union during this time to provide such counsel to American embassies and personnel in the region, and was reportedly impressed at the efficiency of the Soviet response to the incident.

== Personal life ==
Lushbaugh, known to those around him by his preferred nickname "Lush", had, despite his short and balding appearance, an imposing and combative presence, and a pointed sense of humor. He would jokingly describe himself as a "cantankerous bastard", and his nameplate from his desk at Oak Ridge National Laboratory read "HSOBIC" – Head Son-of-a-Bitch In Charge. At the same time, colleagues positively recall working with him, with some of the technicians who worked under him at Los Alamos noting his willingness to take their ideas and proposals into consideration, and to share credit with them on publications.

Lushbaugh's first marriage to Mary Helen Chisolm in 1942 produced three children – William, who was a professor at the University of Mississippi, and Bob and Nancy, both of whom worked at Oak Ridge National Laboratory. Lushbaugh and Chisolm divorced in 1963. His second marriage was to Dorothy Bess Hale in 1963 in Oak Ridge, Tennessee. Dorothy was a research assistant at Los Alamos during his tenure there. They remained married until his death; she died on December 10, 2000.

Lushbaugh died on Friday, October 13, 2000, from complications related to Alzheimer's disease.
