= George W. F. Gaunt =

American politician

George Washington French Gaunt (September 2, 1865 – September 24, 1918) was an American farmer and politician from New Jersey.

== Life ==
Gaunt was born on the Homestead Farm in Mantua Township, New Jersey on September 2, 1865, the son of John Gaunt Jr. and Elizabeth Colson French.

Gaunt attended public school in the Harrison Township and the Deptford School in Woodbury. He was active with agricultural organizations, including the Grange; he was Master of the New Jersey State Grange, lecturer of the National Grange, and High Priest of Demeter. In his sixteen years as Master of the State Grange, the State Grange's membership grew from 3,000 to 25,000. He resided in the Homestead Farm he was born in until 1901, when he bought a farm in Mullica Hill. He worked as a farmer there. He was also president of the Rural Telephone Company.

In 1908, Gaunt was elected to the New Jersey Senate as a Republican, representing Gloucester County. He served in the Senate in 1909, 1910, 1911, 1912, 1913, 1914, 1915, 1916, and 1917. He was considered an authority on agricultural matters, and before his election to the Senate he spoke before Senate committees on agricultural and dairy interests in the state. In his first year in the Senate, he successfully passed the Trolley Freight Bill. He subsequently was actively involved in Public Utility, Cold Storage, the Commission on Tuberculosis in Animals, and Good Roads and Automobile legislation, and passed the Fifty-year Franchise act. When William T. Read resigned from the Senate in March 1916, he was chosen to replace Read as President of the Senate. In that position, he served as Acting Governor while Governor James Fairman Fielder. Under the provisions of the Federal Reserve Act, he was elected a director of the Federal Reserve Bank of Philadelphia. He was re-elected director for a three-year term in 1915. He was a delegate to the 1916 Republican National Convention, and by the time he died he was a member of the State Highways Commission and the State Board of Agriculture.

In 1888, Gaunt married Anna G. West. They had one surviving child, J. Webber.

Gaunt died at home on September 24, 1918. His death was due to spinal injuries he received two years previously while serving as a volunteer fireman. The honorary pallbearers in his funeral included New Jersey Governor Walter Evans Edge, U.S. Senators Joseph S. Frelinghuysen Sr. and David Baird Sr., Congressman William J. Browning, State Senator Edward L. Sturgess, State Treasurer William T. Read, and New Jersey Anti-Saloon League secretary Dr. J. K. Shields. He was buried in the Friends' Cemetery in Mullica Hill.

Political offices
Preceded by William T. Read	President of the New Jersey Senate; 1916–1917	Succeeded by Thomas F. McCran
