= Grosscup =

Grosscup is a surname. Notable people with the surname include:

- Edward Everett Grosscup (1860–1933), American politician
- Lee Grosscup (1936–2020), American football player and sportscaster
- Peter S. Grosscup (1852–1921), American judge
