= Cecil Kelley criticality accident =

1958 nuclear accident at Los Alamos, New Mexico

Coordinates: 35°52′54″N 106°17′54″W

A criticality accident occurred on December 30, 1958, at Los Alamos National Laboratory (LANL) in Los Alamos, New Mexico, in the United States. It is one of 60 known criticality events that have occurred globally outside the controlled conditions of a nuclear reactor or test and the third event that took place in 1958, after events on June 16 at the Y-12 Plant and on October 15 at the Vinča Nuclear Institute. The accident involved plutonium compounds dissolved in liquid chemical reagents; within 35 hours, it killed chemical operator Cecil Kelley by severe radiation poisoning.

== Context of the accident ==
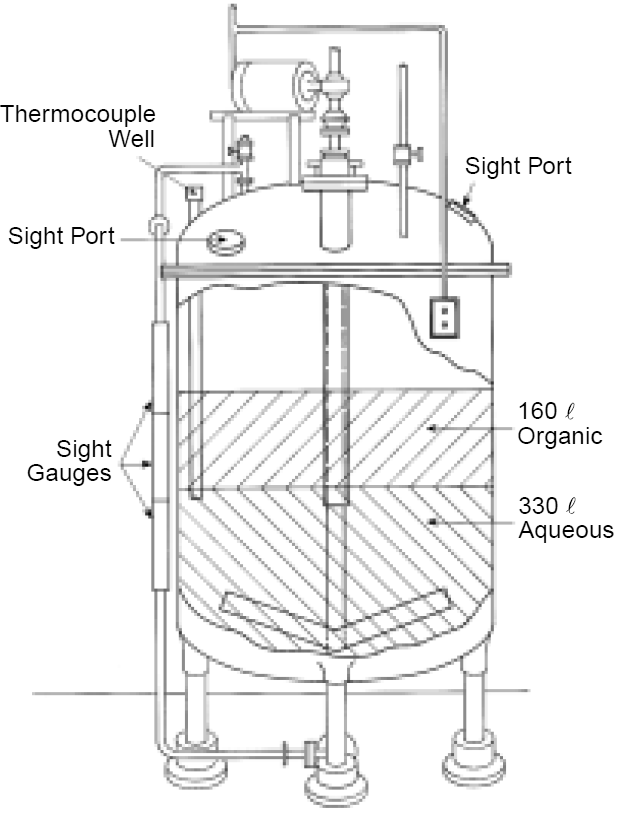
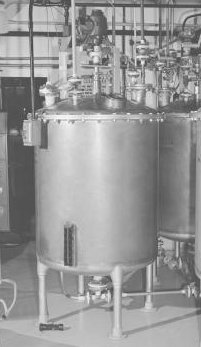
Left: Configuration of solutions (aqueous and organic) in the vessel before the accident. Right: Vessel in which the accident occurred

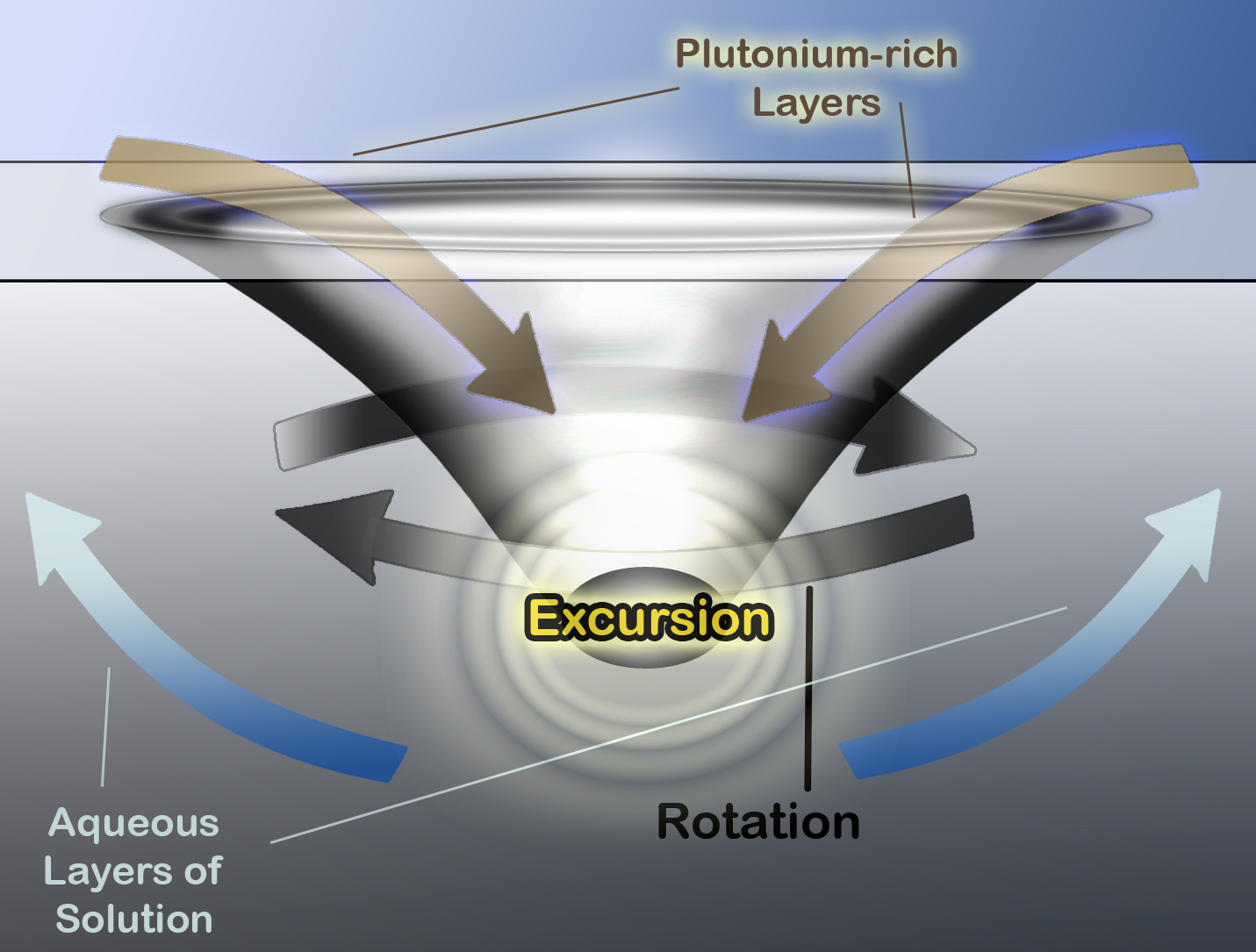
Diagram of the criticality accident

Cecil Kelley was a 38-year-old chemical operator with 11 years of experience; he had spent more than half of this time at LANL, where one of his duties was to operate a large, 1 m^{3} capacity, stainless-steel mixing tank. The tank contained residual plutonium-239 (^{239}Pu) from other experiments and applications, along with various organic solvents and acids in aqueous solution for the purpose of recovery and reuse. In pure form and under normal temperature and pressure, plutonium is a solid, silvery metal. It tarnishes quickly when exposed to air and readily dissolves in concentrated hydrochloric, hydroiodic, perchloric, and other acids. On the day of the accident, the mixing tank was supposed to contain a "lean" concentration of dissolved plutonium (≤ 0.1 g of plutonium per liter of solution) in a bath of highly corrosive nitric acid and a caustic, stabilized, aqueous, organic emulsion; however, the concentration of plutonium in the mixing tank was in fact nearly 200 times higher than Kelley anticipated, as a result of at least two improper transfers of plutonium waste to the tank from undetermined sources. Also, the plutonium was distributed unevenly, with the upper layer of solution containing especially high concentrations, amounting to a total of >3 kg of plutonium, dangerously close to criticality. When Kelley switched on the mixer, a vortex began to form. The denser aqueous layer within the tank was forced outward and upward forming a "bowl", and the less dense, plutonium-rich layer was drawn toward the vessel's center.

== The excursion ==
The optimal shape for any fissile substance to become supercritical is the shape of least surface area—‌a sphere. Although the plutonium-rich solution was not spherical, the vortex made it thicker in the center; this, along with the increase in density and neutron reflectivity of the aqueous layer surrounding it, caused the fissile material in the mixer to become supercritical after approximately one second.

A randomly occurring neutron in any assembly occasionally strikes a fissile nucleus, causing it to fission and liberate more than one neutron. Normally, the effective neutron multiplication factor (the average number of secondary neutrons provoked by one neutron) is intentionally kept far less than 1.0, so that each incipient nuclear chain reaction cannot accelerate; it dies out very quickly. Changes of shape, concentration, neutron reflectivity, and other factors can increase the neutron multiplication factor. As soon as the neutron multiplication factor exceeds 1.0, one of the next random neutrons starts a rapidly growing nuclear chain reaction. In a liquid criticality accident, the energy released by the chain reaction indirectly slows or stops the chain reaction (due to increasing temperature, increasing volume due to thermal expansion and steam formation, and other factors). Sometimes the reaction rate increases again or restarts.

An uncontrolled release of nuclear energy is referred to as a criticality accident or an excursion. This excursion lasted only 200 microseconds, but it released a huge burst of neutrons and gamma radiation before it stopped. Within 3 seconds, the mixer had dispersed the layers in the mixture, which fortuitously made further excursions impossible, unlike the 1964 Wood River Junction criticality accident, in which subsequent actions provoked two additional smaller excursions.

== Immediate consequences ==
Kelley was standing on a ladder looking at the contents of the mixing tank through a viewing window when the excursion occurred. Two other technicians working in the laboratory witnessed a bright flash of blue light followed by a thud. The burst either caused Kelley to collapse or knocked him off the ladder, and he had fallen to the ground. He arose disoriented, and apparently switched the mixer off and then back on again before running out of the building. The other technicians found Kelley outdoors in a state of ataxia (uncoordinated muscle movement) and repeating the phrase, "I'm burning up! I'm burning up!"

Because the possibility of an excursion in a mixing tank had been considered to be virtually non-existent, the technicians decided that Kelley must have somehow been exposed to either alpha radiation, the acid bath, or both, and one of them took him to a chemical shower while the other switched off the mixer. Other staff members arrived at the scene within minutes to find Kelley virtually unconscious. The bright pink color of his face indicated erythema brought on by cutaneous radiation syndrome.

Any accident at Los Alamos involving a radioactive substance requires an immediate investigation by a team of radiation monitoring staff. Even before Kelley was taken to an emergency room, these staff members began examining the mixing room with radiation detectors capable of assessing the alpha radiation from escaped plutonium. Alpha activity would have been widespread if any of the plutonium mixture had escaped the tank, but none was found. Eighteen minutes later, the team began searching for gamma radiation, and were surprised to find intense gamma radiation near the mixing tank, on the order of tens of rads per hour. Such intense gamma radiation could only be produced by significant amounts of fission product; this, plus the otherwise inexplicable flash of light reported by the other two technicians, confirmed that a criticality accident had occurred.

== Kelley's clinical course ==
For the first hour and forty minutes after the accident, Kelley was incoherent, and went through waves of intense vomiting and retching. He then stabilized, was once again able to converse normally, and was able to have his pulse taken and his blood drawn. The blood sample indicated that Kelley had been exposed to about 9 Gy from fast neutrons and 27 Gy from gamma rays—a total of 36 Gy. For an adult human, exposure to 2 Gy from an unfocused radiation source such as an excursion will cause radiation sickness but is not definitely lethal; about 4.5 to 5 Gy is the LD_{50}, or median lethal dose; 8 Gy is the LD_{99}. Kelley had received more than 7 times the LD_{50} and at least 4 times the LD_{99}. Although the medical staff in the emergency room took steps to ease his pain with pethidine and morphine, previous research on radiation exposure in animals indicated Kelley's death was inevitable. Within six hours his lymphocytes were all but gone. A bone biopsy 24 hours after the incident produced bone marrow that was watery and contained no red blood cells. Numerous blood transfusions had no lasting helpful effect: Only 35 hours after his initial exposure and after a final bout of intense restlessness, agitation, sweating, becoming ashen-skinned, and having an irregular pulse, Kelley died of heart failure.

== Implications ==
An investigation into the circumstances of the accident never resulted in a public explanation of how the mixing tank became filled with such a high concentration of plutonium; initially, the blame was placed on Kelley himself.

Robert L. Nance, a colleague of Kelley, was the chemist assigned to recover the remaining plutonium in the tank. This task revealed to him that the solvent in the tank was not as potent as expected (possibly broken down by extended exposure to radiation), so there may have been a buildup to a higher concentration for that reason. The report prepared by Nance was not approved to be published.

Although Kelley had neither ingested nor inhaled any plutonium during the accident, he, like many laboratory technicians at Los Alamos, had been exposed to minute particles of airborne plutonium over the course of several years. An event such as this was therefore considered an "experiment of opportunity". Careful records were kept of every moment of Kelley's life from accident through death and onto the autopsy table. His organs were kept for pathological examination and their plutonium levels analyzed. The results of these tissue analyses were considered fundamental to understanding what would happen to a population during a nuclear attack and impossible to obtain any other way. Although the bone marrow biopsy of Kelley's sternum was performed under the premise that the physicians wished to determine if he were a candidate for a bone marrow transplant, Kelley's death was inevitable, and an actual transplant was not seriously considered.

== Court case ==
In 1996, Doris Kelley and her daughter, Katie Kelley-Mareau, filed a lawsuit against Clarence Lushbaugh, the pathologist who performed the autopsy on Cecil Kelley. The case alleged the misconduct of doctors, the hospital, and the administration of Los Alamos in removing organs from the deceased without consent from next-of-kin over a span of many years (1958–1980). Kelley's autopsy was the first instance of this type of post-mortem analysis, but Lushbaugh and others performed many more in later years at Los Alamos. During a deposition for the case, Lushbaugh, when asked who gave him the authority to take eight pounds (3.6 kilograms) of organs and tissue from Kelley's body, said, "God gave me permission." The class action suit was settled by the defendants for about $9.5 million in 2002 and an additional $800,000 in 2007. None of the defendants admitted any wrongdoing.

== See also ==
- Nuclear criticality safety
- 1964 Wood River Junction criticality accident
- 1999 Tokaimura nuclear accidents
