= Bradley Abelow =

American businessman (born 1958)

Chief of Staff to the Governor of New Jersey
- In office September 1, 2007 – December 1, 2008
- Governor: Jon Corzine
- Preceded by: Thomas Shea
- Succeeded by: Lisa Jackson

Treasurer of New Jersey
- In office January 23, 2006 – September 1, 2007
- Governor: Jon Corzine
- Preceded by: John McCormac
- Succeeded by: Michellene Davis

Personal details
- Born: Bradley Ira Abelow; June 9, 1958 (age 68) New York City, U.S.
- Party: Democratic
- Education: Northwestern University (BA); Yale University (MBA)

Bradley Ira Abelow (born June 9, 1958) is an American businessman and political leader who formerly served as chief of staff to the governor of New Jersey in the cabinet of Governor Jon Corzine. Prior to entering Governor Corzine's Cabinet as state treasurer, he was a top executive for the Wall Street firm of Goldman Sachs. After working in Corzine's cabinet, he was global chief operating officer of MF Global joining the firm on September 13, 2010.

== Wall Street career ==
He served for 15 years in executive positions with Goldman Sachs, where he worked with Governor Jon Corzine, the investment bank's former CEO. Abelow headed the company's global operations and previously managed its Hong Kong office. During his tenure, he also served on the board of the Depository Trust & Clearing Corporation.

In 2011, Abelow testified before the United States House Committee on Financial Services during hearings on MF Global, addressing the firm’s risk management and oversight practices.

== Treasurer of New Jersey ==
Abelow formerly served as New Jersey State Treasurer. He was appointed treasurer by Governor of New Jersey, Jon Corzine and took office on January 23, 2006. In his role as treasurer, Abelow oversaw the New Jersey Department of the Treasury, and its approximately 4,000 employees across the Treasury's eleven divisions and offices which perform three major functions: Revenue collection and generation, assets management, and statewide support services.

As treasurer, Abelow held seats on several state boards in New Jersey. In June 2007, he was named the #3 most influential political personality in the state of New Jersey. While at the Treasury, Abelow put together the 2006 and 2007 state budgets and helped craft several initiatives the Corzine Administration launched with regard to fixing the state's financial structure.

== Chief of Staff to the Governor ==
On September 1, 2007, Corzine named Abelow to serve as his chief of staff, replacing Thomas Shea. Abelow was considered an unusual choice for the post since he had no background in New Jersey politics and was primarily a business executive by training. Most of Abelow's predecessors as chief of staff had been long-standing New Jersey political operatives, lobbyists and former legislators.

On December 1, 2008, Abelow was succeeded as chief of staff by Lisa P. Jackson, who had served as the Commissioner of the New Jersey Department of Environmental Protection.

== Personal life ==
Abelow received a Bachelor of Arts (B.A.) degree from Northwestern University, and was awarded an M.B.A. from the Yale School of Management.

Formerly a New York resident, Abelow relocated to Montclair, New Jersey, with his wife and three children.

Political offices
Preceded by John McCormac	Treasurer of New Jersey; 2006–2007	Succeeded by Michellene Davis; Acting Treasurer
Preceded by Thomas Shea	Chief of Staff to the Governor of New Jersey; September 1, 2007 – December 1, 2008	Succeeded by Lisa P. Jackson
