= Joseph C. Salema =

Joseph C. Salema is the former Chief of Staff to New Jersey Governor James Florio, a position he held from 1990 to 1993. Salema resigned in the Spring of 1993 amid intensifying media scrutiny during an investigation of illegal misconduct while serving the State of New Jersey.

He lived in Wenonah, New Jersey and is the married father of two children.

== Armacon Securities Scandal ==
Prior to becoming the Governor's Chief of Staff in 1990, Salema joined in a partnership with longtime friend and associate, Nicholas Rudi, within the Armacon Securities firm. Seven months after being named Governor James Florio's Chief of Staff, Salema engaged in a blind trust with Armacon Securities, in what was later speculated to be an attempt to conceal a personal interest.

=== Investigation ===
In 1990, Mark Fitterman, the Associate Director of the U.S. Securities and Exchange Commission's Market Regulation division, led the investigation into whether the Merrill Lynch investment bank took part in an illegal pay to play scheme in the sale of $2.9 billion in New Jersey Turnpike bonds. In the sale of such bonds, it is considered advantageous for an investment bank to attain the lead manager mandate, as these banks customarily keep 50% of all underwriting fees.

It is during the prospective sale of these bonds (in February 1990) that Armacon Securities' cash holdings increased from $4,600 to $412,000; Armacon's assets skyrocketed from $10,100 to $665,577 and their net capital increased in similar fashion from $8,100 to $395,710. Armacon Securities prospered greatly while performing extremely little underwriting during this period. In 1991, the following year, Armacon took in $727,800 in underwriting fees, while its total operating expenses were less than $50,000. The firm operated without any staff to sell the bonds, no clients to buy the bonds and very little capital with which to finance an inventory.

In the three years that Joseph Salema served as the Governor's Chief of Staff, Armacon Securities received over one million dollars in underwriting fees while lacking the necessities a firm would require to operate as an underwriter.

In 1993, Armacon Securities became a familiar name in the daily news media. Journalists became increasingly aware that a chief aide to the Governor of New Jersey was a partner in a firm that was managing to post robust returns while remaining virtually inactive. By May 1993, Joseph Salema willingly resigned amid growing public sentiment that he had inappropriately made use of his position to funnel cash and assets into his firm. Salema and his legal representation denied being the subject of the federal inquiry, claiming the resignation was a measure to spare Governor James Florio further political embarrassment.

== Guilty Plea and Sentencing ==
At the conclusion of the federal investigation, Joseph Salema was formally indicted in February 1995 for the acceptance of kickbacks in exchange for influencing New Jersey state bond deals.

Salema pleaded guilty to the federal charge of sharing in more than $200,000 in kickbacks. In August 1995, he was sentenced to six months in a halfway house and six months of home confinement. Salema was also fined $10,000 and required to serve 1,400 hours of community service. (His Armacon Securities partner, Nicholas Rudi, was later acquitted of all federal charges after going to trial in June 1996).

In a subsequent civil suit filed by the U.S. Securities and Exchange Commission, Joseph Salema reached a settlement, paying $324,764.55 without admitting or denying liability.
