= National Medical Fellowships =

U.S. nonprofit organization

National Medical Fellowships, Inc.
- Formation: 1946; 80 years ago
- Founder: Franklin McLean
- Type: Nonprofit
- Location: Alexandria, Virginia, United States
- Services: Scholarships, service learning programs, diversity in clinical research
- Key people: Michellene Davis, President & CEO; Dr. Bryan Baugh, Chair
- Website: https://nmfonline.org/

National Medical Fellowships, Inc. (NMF) is a nonprofit organization in the United States that provides scholarships and support for underrepresented students in medicine and the health professions.

Founded in 1946, NMF has provided over $45 million to more than 32,000 students underrepresented in medicine. The organization offers need-based and merit scholarships to Black, Indigenous, People of Color (BIPOC) students of medicine and other health professions and works to increase diversity in research.

== History ==
NMF was started by Dr. Franklin C. McLean MD, PhD, then a professor of physiology at the University of Chicago. Dr. McLean saw that the lack of opportunities for African American physicians was a problem.

NMF started by awarding scholarships to African American physicians and medical students. Over time, NMF expanded its scholarships to other groups that were underrepresented in medicine.

The New York Times credited NMF for its contributions to decreasing racial discrimination and rising medical school enrollment by minorities in 1962.

== Alumni ==
The Alumni Alliance and the Young Leaders Council advance alumni engagement.
