= Ethel A. Grosscup =

American physical educator

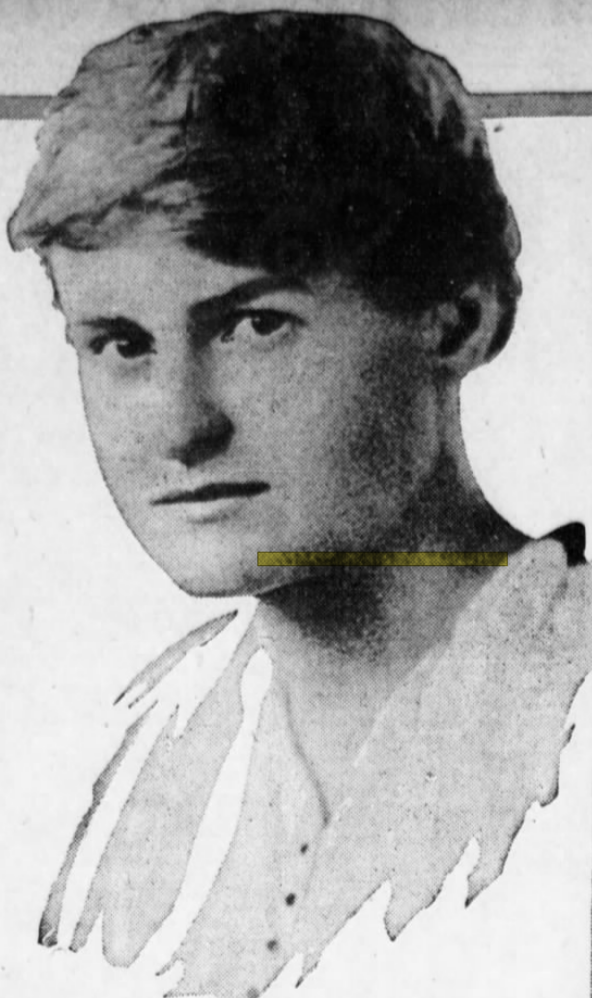
- Ethel A. Grosscup, from a 1915 newspaper
- Born: Ethel Amanda Grosscup; July 1891; Wenonah, New Jersey
- Died: May 29, 1949 (age 57); Montclair, New Jersey
- Occupation: Physical educator
- Father: Edward Everett Grosscup

Ethel Amanda Grosscup (July 1891 – May 29, 1949) was an American physical educator and child health consultant, based in New Jersey.

== Early life and education ==
Grosscup was raised in Wenonah, New Jersey, the daughter of Edward Everett Grosscup and Anna Josephine Swaney Grosscup. She graduated from Goucher College in 1914 and trained further as a physical educator at the New Haven Normal School of Gymnastics. She earned a master's degree at New York University in 1931, with a thesis titled "Juvenile delinquency fluctuations in areas with and without playgrounds."

While in college, Grosscup was president of the Goucher Athletic Association, and a member of the basketball team. She also competed in swimming, diving, gymnastics, baseball, and hockey events, and was active in dramatics, student government, and music programs. She was part of Goucher's delegation to a YWCA convention on Lake George in 1911.

== Career ==
In 1915, Grosscup was appointed chair of the English department and director of athletics at the International Institute for Girls in Spain, a Protestant school run by American missionary Alice Gordon Gulick. She was director of physical education at Hollins College in Virginia from 1916 to 1920. During World War I, she volunteered to train hundreds of young women for work with the Red Cross, and to create a "coast patrol guard" of young women, from a base camp on land she owned in New Jersey.

Grosscup became head of the physical training department at Montclair State Normal School in New Jersey in 1920. In 1922, she staged an original outdoor pageant in Montclair, titled A College Medley, as a benefit for Goucher College; it included dozens of school children and clubwomen in the large cast. She was assistant director of physical training for the New Jersey Board of Education until she resigned in 1928, and an advisor to the National Tuberculosis Association in the early 1930s. She spoke about tuberculosis prevention to students at the University of Missouri, and before other community groups. In 1930, she helped plan "health trails" for local Girl Scout councils in Binghamton and Newburgh.

In 1931, Grosscup gave a lecture on child health at the New York School of Social Work. She spoke at the American Physical Education Association state and regional conferences in Atlantic City in 1926, Louisville in 1931, and in Jacksonville in 1932. She organized the Round Table Child Health Conference in Syracuse, and gave a paper at the World Federation of Education Associations conference.

== Publications ==
- "Physical Education Progress in the Rural Districts of New Jersey" (1927)
- "The Value of Rest and Sleep" (1931)

== Personal life ==
Grosscup died suddenly in 1949, at the age of 57, in Montclair.
