= Joe F. Vitale =

Member of the New Jersey Senate

Joe Vitale
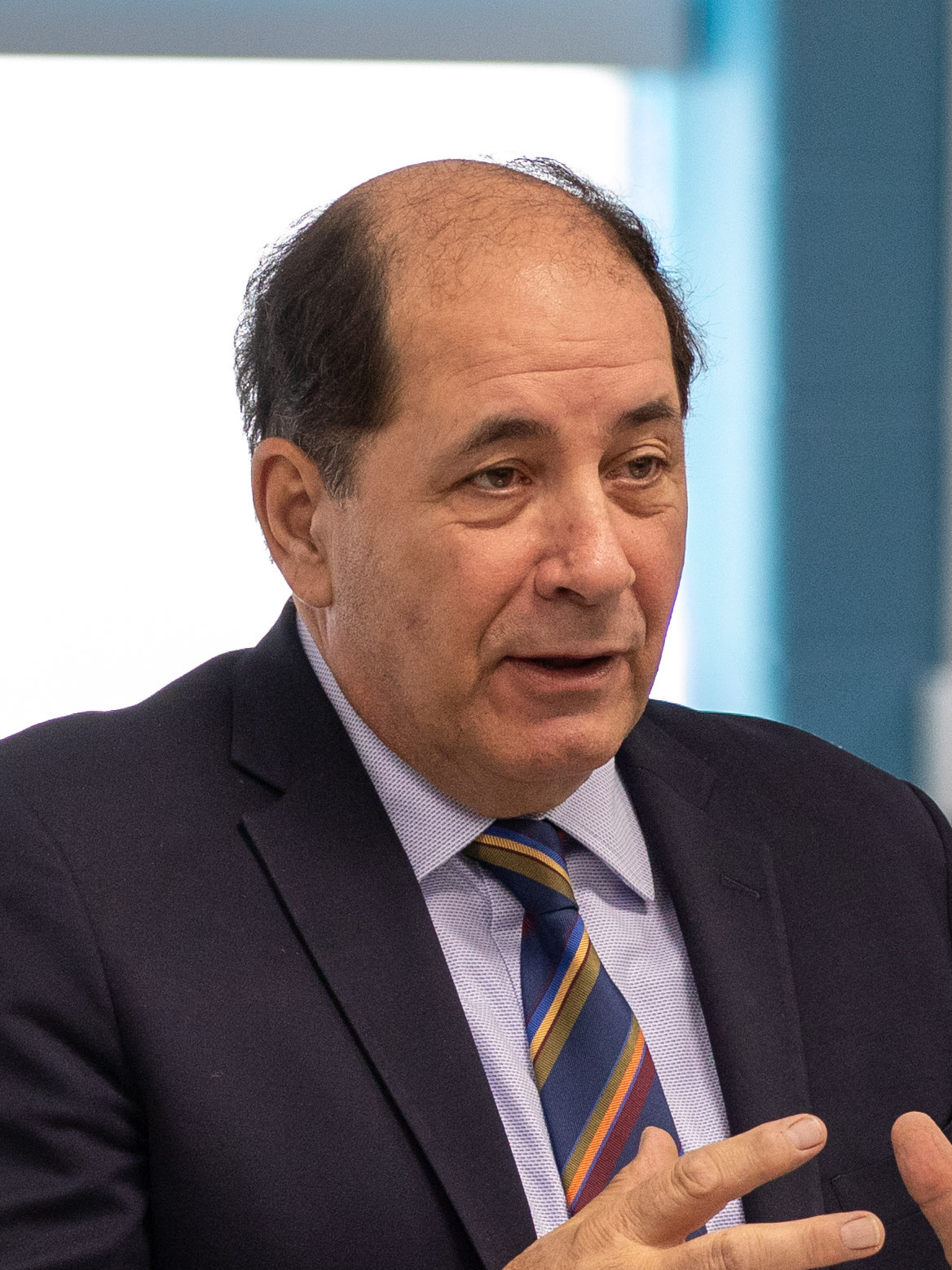
- Vitale speaking in 2026

Member of the New Jersey Senate from the 19th district
- Incumbent
- Assumed office January 13, 1998
- Preceded by: Jim McGreevey

Chair of the New Jersey Senate Committee on Health, Human Services, and Senior Citizens
- Incumbent
- Assumed office January 10, 2012

Deputy Majority Leader of the New Jersey State Senate
- In office 2004–2010
- Preceded by: Position Established
- Succeeded by: Position Abolished

Interim Mayor of Woodbridge Township, New Jersey
- In office July 25, 2006 – November 13, 2006
- Preceded by: Frank Pelzman
- Succeeded by: John McCormac

Personal details
- Born: November 10, 1954 (age 71) Elizabeth, New Jersey, U.S.
- Party: Democratic
- Website: Legislative Webpage

Joseph F. Vitale (born November 10, 1954) is an American Democratic Party politician, who has been serving in the New Jersey State Senate since 1998, where he represents the 19th Legislative District. He is also the former Mayor of Woodbridge Township, having been elected by the Township Council in July 2006 to fill a temporary vacancy, following the death of Mayor Frank Pelzman. Senator Vitale came to the Senate in 1998 filling a vacancy created when Jim McGreevey stepped down from his seat as part of his ultimately unsuccessful bid for election as Governor of New Jersey in 1997. Vitale attended John F. Kennedy Memorial High School in Woodbridge Township.

== Mayor of Woodbridge ==
Following Pelzman's death in June 2006, Vitale volunteered to serve as Woodbridge's interim mayor. He was nominated by the township's Democratic Committee and voted in by the Township Council to serve a four-month term as mayor, saying he was taking on the mayor's job in order to continue Pelzman's programs and to provide leadership during the interim period, though the time constraints of dual office holding were making him rule out seeking the remaining 14 months of Pelzman's term during the November 2006 special election for mayor. Vitale endorsed former State Treasurer John McCormac in the special election and served as mayor until November 13, 2006, when McCormac was sworn in.

== New Jersey Senate ==
Vitale was elected in the 1997 elections to succeed Jim McGreevey who was running for Governor. As the 19th districts consists of mainly Democrat-friendly towns in Middlesex County, he has been easily reelected in every Senate election never winning by less than 20 points. From 2004 to 2009, Vitale was the Deputy Majority Leader in the Senate. Currently, he is Chairman of the Senate on the Health, Human Services and Senior Citizens Committee and the Vice Chairman in the Senate for Economic Growth. Vitale and William Gormley were the lead sponsors of the 1999 New Jersey Homeless Youth Act, which allows minors to seek homeless shelter without parental approval. He is also the sponsor of bills to allow needle exchange programs for drug users and to prohibit gun ownership by those convicted of domestic violence offenses. Senator Vitale was the prime sponsor of over forty bills that were signed into law, including bills establishing the KidCare and FamilyCare health care coverage programs, as well as a bill which would require nursing aides to undergo certified criminal background checks, a bill which would prohibit the use of mandatory overtime in health care facilities except in emergency situations, and the New Jersey Health Care Access and Patient Protection Act, which requires the State to compile information on doctors, such as office location and medical malpractice history, in a database available to the public. As chairman of the Health and Human Services Committee, Vitale has blocked a vote in the Senate on a measure that has passed twice in the General Assembly under which non-professional bakers would be allowed to legally sell their goods to consumers, leaving New Jersey and Wisconsin as the only states that forbid the practice. Vitale has cited "public safety and public health concerns", along with the impact of home-based competition on local brick-and-mortar businesses, as his reasons for blocking the measure.

=== Committees ===
Committee assignments for the 2024—2025 Legislative Session are:

- Health, Human Services and Senior Citizens (as chair)

=== District 19 ===
Each of the 40 districts in the New Jersey Legislature has one representative in the New Jersey Senate and two members in the New Jersey General Assembly. The representatives from the 19th District for the 2024—2025 Legislative Session are:

- Senator Joe F. Vitale (D)
- Assemblyman Craig Coughlin (D)
- Assemblywoman Yvonne Lopez (D)

== Electoral history ==
=== New Jersey Senate ===
19th Legislative District General Election, 2023
Party	Candidate	Votes	%
Democratic	Joseph F. Vitale (incumbent)	19,571	63.2
Republican	Maria Garcia	11,392	36.8
Total votes		30,963	100.0
Democratic hold			

19th Legislative District general election, 2021
Party	Candidate	Votes	%
Democratic	Joseph F. Vitale (incumbent)	27,767	59.90
Republican	Pedro "Peter" Pisar	18,585	40.10
Total votes		46,352	100.0
Democratic hold			

New Jersey general election, 2017
Party	Candidate	Votes	%	±%
Democratic	Joseph F. Vitale (Incumbent)	27,681	100.0	▲37.4
Total votes		27,68	100.0	

New Jersey State Senate elections, 2013
Party	Candidate	Votes	%
Democratic	Joseph F. Vitale (Incumbent)	24,126	62.6
Republican	Robert Luban	14,439	37.4

New Jersey State Senate elections, 2011
Party	Candidate	Votes	%
Democratic	Joseph F. Vitale (Incumbent)	18,623	66.9
Republican	Paul Lund, Jr.	9,232	33.1

New Jersey State Senate elections, 2007
Party	Candidate	Votes	%
Democratic	Joseph F. Vitale (incumbent)	18,864	66.4
Republican	Donald H. Nelsen, Jr.	9,557	33.6

New Jersey general election, 2003
Party	Candidate	Votes	%	±%
Democratic	Joseph F. Vitale (Incumbent)	22,643	65.5	▼11.9
Republican	Paul "Daniels" Danielczyk	11,949	34.5	▲11.9
Total votes		34,592	100.0	

New Jersey general election, 2001
Party	Candidate	Votes	%
Democratic	Joseph F. Vitale (Incumbent)	37,322	77.4
Republican	Naresh G. "Nick" Gidwani	10,928	22.6
Total votes		48,250	100.0

New Jersey general election, 1997
Party	Candidate	Votes	%	±%
Democratic	Joseph F. Vitale	32,454	60.2	▲12.6
Republican	Stephen A. Mikulak	21,445	39.8	▼5.3
Total votes		53,899	100.0	

New Jersey Senate
Preceded by Jim McGreevey	Member of the New Jersey Senate for the 19th District; January 13, 1998 – Present	Succeeded by Incumbent
Political offices
Preceded by Frank Pelzman	Mayor of Woodbridge Township, New Jersey; July 25, 2006 – November 13, 2006	Succeeded by John McCormac
