= Amniotic fluid embolism =

Potentially fatal complication of pregnancy

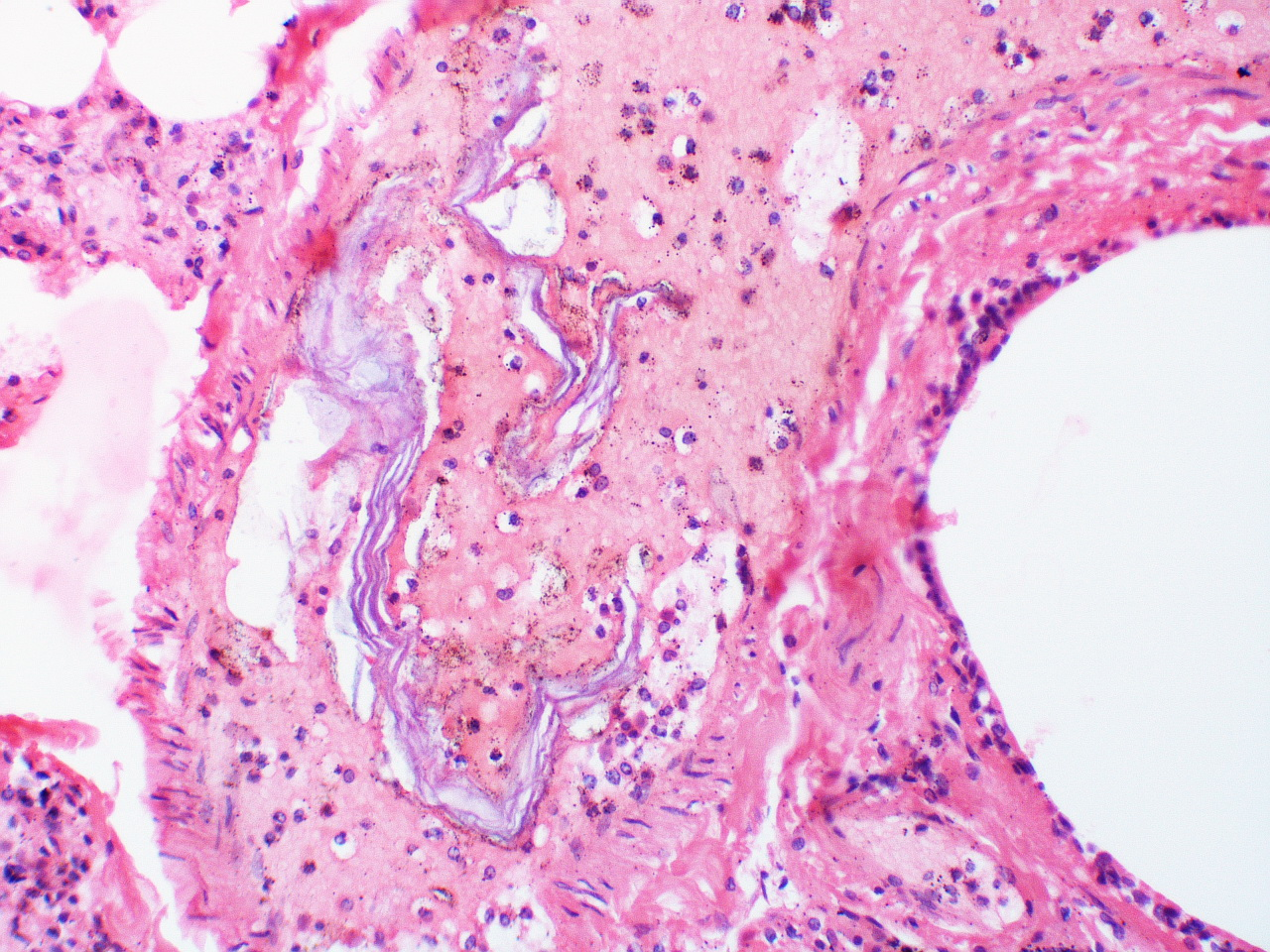
- Intravascular squames are present in this example of amniotic fluid embolism.
- Specialty: Obstetrics
- Risk factors: Advanced maternal age, history of pre-eclampsia, uterine rupture, fetal distress
- Frequency: 1 in 20,000 births

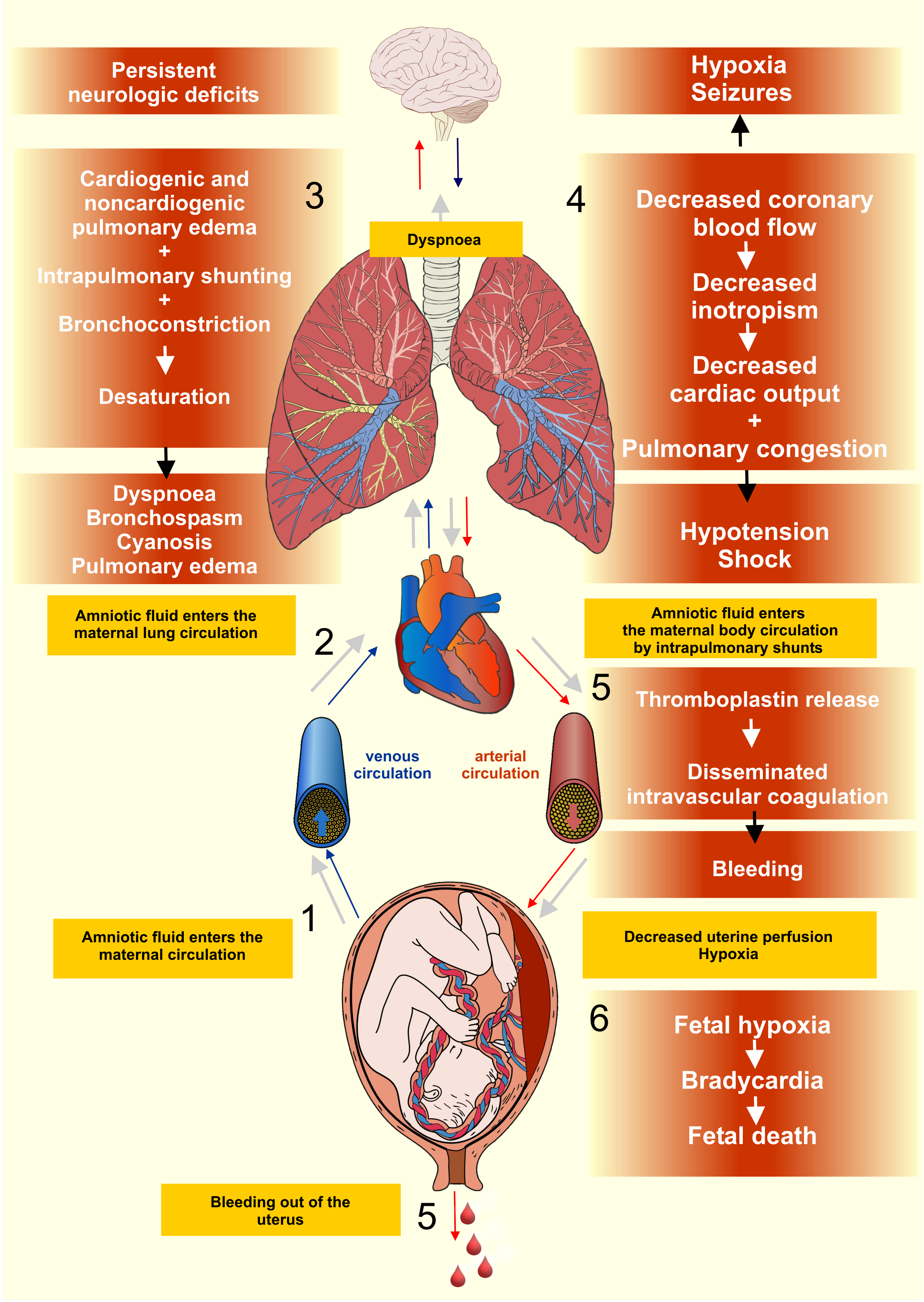
Pathophysiology of the amniotic fluid embolism

An amniotic fluid embolism (AFE) is a life-threatening childbirth (obstetric) emergency in which amniotic fluid enters the blood stream of the mother, triggering a serious reaction which results in cardiorespiratory (heart and lung) collapse and massive bleeding (coagulopathy). The rate at which it occurs is 1 instance per 20,000 births and it comprises 10% of all maternal deaths.

== Signs and symptoms ==
Amniotic fluid embolism is suspected when a woman giving birth experiences very sudden insufficient oxygen to body tissues, low blood pressure, and profuse bleeding due to defects in blood coagulation.

The signs and symptoms of amniotic fluid embolism can vary from one individual to another but involve systemic involvement of multiple organ systems. Often, a patient may present with a cough due to the release of bradykinin, an inflammatory marker released during times of pain and which causes an anaphylactoid reaction. The cough may then progress to dyspnea and shortness of breath or difficulty breathing due to the vasoconstriction of the pulmonary arterioles making it more difficult for air to flow through. This decreased air flow will lead to the decrease of oxygen being delivered to the tissues to offload carbon dioxide from the blood. The heart will try to compensate by speeding up and causing tachycardia or a fast heart rate in the mother. The fetus will respond to the changes in the mother if still in labor by exhibiting tachycardia and decelerations in the fetal heart rate tracing. It will then register as a low pulse oximetry reading when performed by the health care staff and will result in hypoxia.

Most commonly patients will experience hypotension or low blood pressure due to the widespread inflammation and anaphylaxis occurring.

As the amniotic fluid builds up in the lungs, the patient may begin to exhibit signs of pulmonary hypertension due to the fluid blocking the blood flow of the lungs and decreasing the oxygen. As the amniotic fluid embolism progresses the final stage before cardiovascular collapse involves hemorrhaging or large volume blood loss. This leads to the over activation of the coagulation cascade creating an over production of blood clots with the inability to be broken down resulting in DIC or disseminated intravascular coagulation.

== Causes and pathophysiology ==
There are several posited ways that have been positioned to cause amniotic fluid embolism. The first of which involves the thought that a combination of one of the following that include a difficult labor, a placenta that is abnormal and trauma to the abdomen through a caesarean section or other surgical tools dissipates the barrier that exists from the maternal fluid to the fetal fluid. The disruption then causes a buildup of hydrostatic pressures and oncotic pressures leaking the fetal fluid into the maternal circulation. This fluid is then carried through the veins to the inferior vena cava to the right atrium and on to the right ventricle eventually entering the pulmonary artery and disseminating through the pulmonary circuit. This causes the fluid of the alveoli of the lungs to build up and cause increased pressures that put extra work on the heart. This leads to pulmonary hypertension causing right ventricular heart failure which leads to cardiovascular collapse.

The second school of thought is that a series of inflammatory markers in amniotic fluid causes a widespread inflammatory activation in the blood throughout the maternal circulation. This causes intense pulmonary vasospasm leading to dysregulation of the pulmonary circulation causing failure in the systemic circulation. This school of thought is supported by a study which showed that amniotic fluid can activate complement. Additionally, another study showed activity levels of C1 esterase inhibitor, a key regulator of the complement system, are significantly decreased in amniotic fluid embolism patients compared with control women.

Furthermore, amniotic fluid contains further elements such as tissue factor and other clotting factors that lead to a hypercoagulable state or consistent development and formation of blood clots in the body with the inability to be broken down. This hypercoagulable state is amplified by the decreased C1 esterase inhibitor levels as this protein is the primary inhibitor of Factor XIa and Factor XIIa in the clotting cascade, and deficiency has been shown to be associated with an increased risk of venous thromboembolism. This leads to the sequelae of DIC or disseminated intravascular coagulation. The DIC in amniotic fluid embolism is often associated with hyperfibrinolysis, which is likely to be due to elevated tissue plasminogen activator (tPA) and decreased total thrombin-activatable fibrinolysis inhibitor (TAFI).

It is also supposed that endothelin a potent vasoconstrictor is upregulated during the course of the amniotic fluid embolism in the maternal circulation. This endothelin acts in an antagonistic fashion to blood vessels causing intense vasoconstriction. This leads to super tight vessels that cut off the blood supply to the lungs and heart resulting in cardiorespiratory collapse.

=== Risk factors ===
The occurrence of amniotic fluid embolism is not readily defined as it is a spontaneous event and has not set progression. However, it is most known to occur alongside a cesarean section delivery, a difficult vaginal birth and hours after delivery has been completed.

Some risk factors for amniotic fluid embolism include:

- Advanced maternal age during birth
- Prior history of caesarean section
- A known history of eclampsia or preeclampsia in a prior or current pregnancy
- Multigestational pregnancy
- Previous or current abdominal trauma
- A history of placenta previa or any abnormal placenta implantation
- Gestational hypertension or diabetes mellitus
- Uterine rupture
- Vacuum assisted delivery
- Placental abruption
- Amnioinfusion

The method by which labor is induced seemingly plays a role in the risk for amniotic fluid embolism as well. Induction with vaginal prostaglandin E2 was seen as significantly increasing the relative risk for the emergence of amniotic fluid embolism on a laboring mother.

Overall, however, any method of induction for labor including surgical induction, artificial rupture of membranes or oxytocin is seen as increasing the risk of amniotic fluid embolism in labor.

Male fetuses and fetuses of low birth weight also present an increased risk to mothers.

== Diagnosis ==
In order to diagnose amniotic fluid embolism, there are a few important factors that must be present:

1. Hypoxia
2. Hypotension
3. Acutely severe hemorrhage
4. Occurs during labor or up to 30 minutes after labor

In order to diagnose an amniotic fluid embolism, an arterial blood gas (ABG) must be taken immediately to determine the acid-base status. The ABG should demonstrate a low PH and increased PCO2 levels consistent with a respiratory acidosis. Continuous pulse oximetry readings as well will determine the level of hypoxia and what the oxygen requirements are.

Coagulation studies should also be collected. Special attention should be paid to the PT (prothrombin time) and the PTT (partial thromboplastin time). If coagulation factors are being used, the PT will be prolonged and the PTT may be normal or prolonged.

A type and screen should also be ordered in case there needs to be blood products transfused in the event of an hemorrhage.

=== Biomarkers ===
There are several biomarkers that are said to be able to determine if AFE will occur or has occurred, including:

- Insulin-like growth-factor-binding protein-1 (ILGFBP-1)-can be detected in amniotic fluid and if leaked into the maternal circulation can be measured as it has high sensitivity for detecting breach in the maternal-fetal circulation.
- C3 and C4 levels-significantly low in amniotic fluid embolism
- Tumor markers present in certain cancers like CEA (carcinogenic embryonic antigen) and CA-125 are also found in high amounts in amniotic fluid

== Treatment and management ==
When dealing with a patient with amniotic fluid embolism, stabilizing the patient is the first line of action. If the patient is in need of oxygen, oxygen delivered via a high flow rebreather mask should be given. If a patient is unstable and unable to receive oxygen via the high flow rebreather mask or nasal cannula, then steps should be taken to support the patient via endotracheal tube and placed on a ventilator.

A patient at risk of cardiovascular compromise due to late stage vasodilation of the blood vessels should be given phenylephrine to vasoconstrict the arteries and raise the blood pressure to prevent persistent hypotension Due to the nature of AFE being an anaphylaxis-like reaction epinephrine should be given as well.

If hemorrhage occurs, the transfusion of packed red blood cells is given promptly to prevent further complications. In the case of DIC, recombinant activated factor VIIa is a quick way to address this issue. Serine proteinase inhibitor FOY and Aprotinin have also been used to treat DIC in AFE.

The successful use of heparin in these cases could be attributable not only to it being an anticoagulant useful in the treatment of DIC, but also due to its ability to enhance c1 esterase inhibitor activity thereby reducing complement activation and inflammation. A case report published in 2015 also documented the successful use of c1 esterase inhibitor concentrate in the treatment of amniotic fluid embolism.

A case report on Amniotic Fluid Embolism published in the A & A Practice Journal in 2020 has revealed that when milrinone is administered as an aerosol, selective pulmonary vasodilation occurs without significant changes in mean arterial pressure or systemic vascular resistance; and if used immediately after Amniotic Fluid Embolism, inhaled milrinone may mitigate the pulmonary vasoconstriction.

== Epidemiology ==
Amniotic fluid embolism is very uncommon and the rate at which it occurs is 1 instance per 20,000 births. Though rare, it comprises 10% of all maternal deaths.

== History ==
This rare complication has been recorded seventeen times prior to 1950. The complication was originally described in 1926 by J. R. Meyer at the University of São Paulo. A 1941 case study of eight autopsies of pregnant women who died suddenly during childbirth by Clarence Lushbaugh and Paul Steiner enabled widespread recognition of the diagnosis within the medical community, and was eventually republished as a landmark paper in the Journal of the American Medical Association.
