= Mayor of Woodbridge Township, New Jersey =

Political office in the United States

Mayor of Woodbridge Township
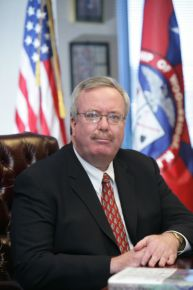
- Incumbent; John McCormac since November 13, 2006
- Term length: Four years
- Website: Mayor John E. McCormac

The Mayor of Woodbridge Township is the official head and chief executive officer of Woodbridge Township in Middlesex County, New Jersey, U.S. The mayor serves a four-year term. On June 29, 2006, incumbent mayor Frank Pelzman died of cancer, leading to the appointment of state senator Joe Vitale as interim mayor. Former state treasurer John McCormac was won a special election for the office in November 2006 and has since been reelected in 2007, 2011, 2015, and 2019.

== List ==
- Walter Zirpolo (D) January 1, 1962 to April 11, 1967
- Ralph Barone (D), April 11, 1967 to December 31, 1971
- John J. Cassidy (R), January 1, 1972 to December 31, 1979
- Joseph DeMarino (D), January 1, 1980 to December 31, 1983
- Philip M. Cerria (R), January 1, 1984 to December 31, 1987
- Joseph DeMarino (D), January 1, 1988 to December 31, 1992
- Jim McGreevey (D), January 1, 1992 to January 15, 2002
- Frank Pelzman (D), January 17, 2002 to June 29, 2006
- Joe Vitale (D), Interim Mayor, July 25, 2006 to November 13, 2006
- John McCormac (D), November 13, 2006 to present
