= Aaron Binder =

American politician

Treasurer of New Jersey
- Incumbent
- Assumed office January 20, 2026; Acting: January 20, 2026 – February 24, 2026
- Governor: Mikie Sherrill
- Preceded by: Elizabeth Maher Muoio

Personal details
- Party: Democratic
- Education: Brandeis University (BA); University of Pennsylvania (MPA)

Aaron Binder is an American politician. He has served as treasurer of New Jersey since 2026.

== Life ==
Binder was raised in Portland, Maine, and attended Brandeis University, where he pitched on the baseball team. He earned a master's degree at the Fels Institute of Government of the University of Pennsylvania. Then a resident of the Holland section of Northampton Township, Bucks County, Pennsylvania, Binder was named to represent the United States in softball at the 2013 Maccabiah Games, though an elbow injury he attributed to his years pitching in cold weather meant that he would be unlikely to play.

Political offices
Preceded by Elizabeth Maher Muoio	Treasurer of New Jersey; 2026–present	Incumbent
