= Michellene Davis =

American lawyer, executive, and politician

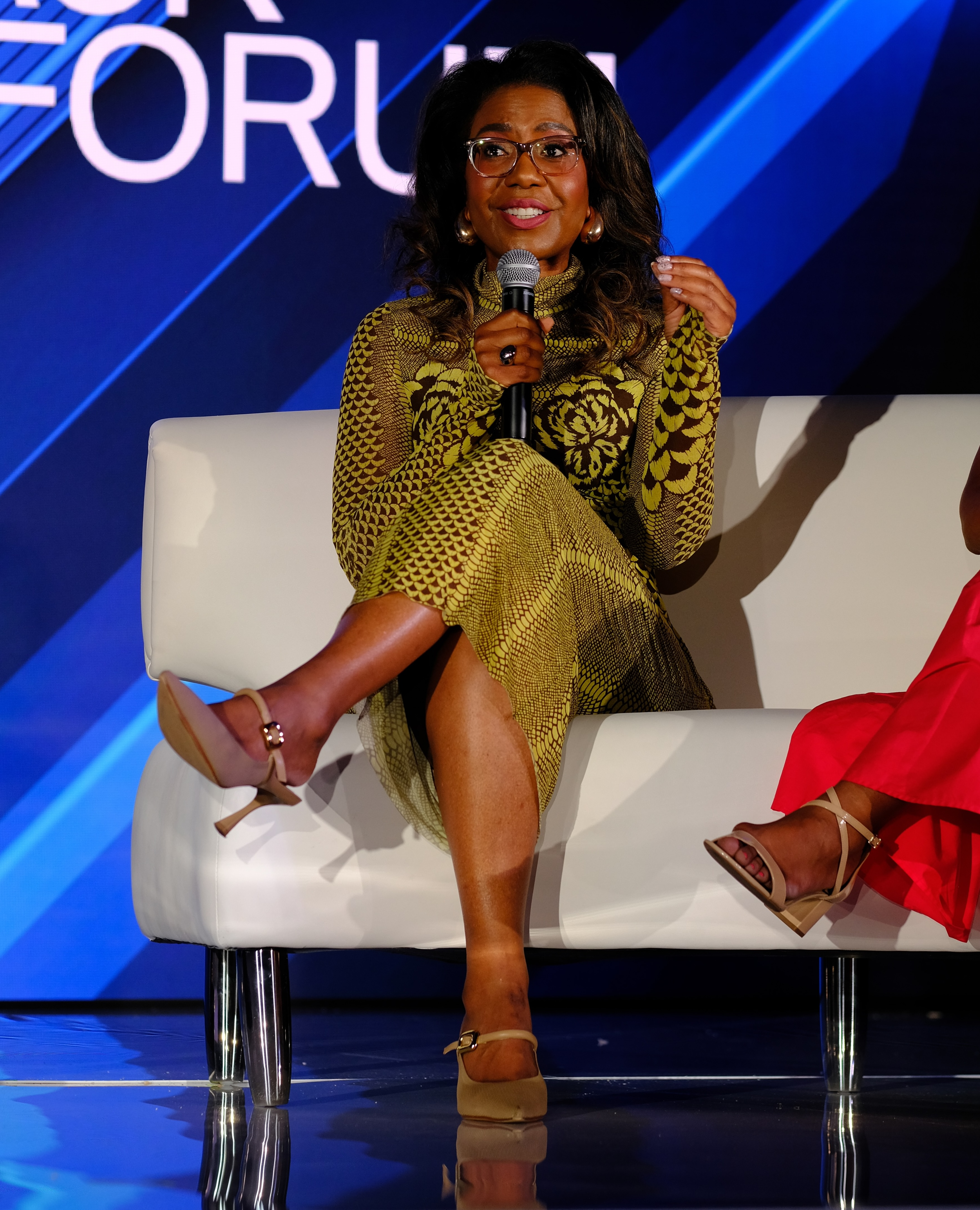

New Jersey State Treasurer
- In office September 2007 – January 2008
- Governor: Jon Corzine
- Preceded by: Bradley Abelow
- Succeeded by: David Rousseau

Personal details
- Born: Camden, New Jersey, US
- Education: Seton Hall University, Seton Hall University School of Law
- Occupation: Lawyer, executive, politician

Michellene Davis is an American lawyer and executive who served as acting State Treasurer of New Jersey from September 2007 to January 2008. She was the first African American and the second woman to hold this office. As of 2023, she is CEO of National Medical Fellowships.

== Life and career ==
Born and raised in a working-class household in Camden, New Jersey, Davis attended private school in Cherry Hill. She attended Camden County Technical Schools Pennsauken Campus, where she was active with Future Business Leaders of America. She graduated with honors from Seton Hall University and received her JD from Seton Hall University School of Law. She practiced law as a public defender and trial attorney and became the youngest person to serve as executive director of the New Jersey Lottery under Democratic governor Richard Codey. Next, she served as a senior policy advisor in the New Jersey Department of Health and Senior Services and then as deputy state treasurer under Governor Jon Corzine. Corzine then appointed Davis to serve as acting state treasurer, an office she held from September 2007 to January 2008. She was the first African American and the second woman to hold this office. She administered a $30 billion budget, 6500 staff, and a $70 billion pension investment portfolio and established an office of supplier diversity. She subsequently worked as chief policy counsel to Governor Corzine.

Davis joined RWJBarnabas Health in 2009–2010. She was first woman and first person of color to serve as executive vice president in the health system's history. She was responsible for corporate and governmental affairs, global affairs, and policy development as well as healthy living and employee wellness and engagement. In 2012, NJBIZ Magazine named her New Jersey's top healthcare lobbyist. In 2017, she launched the company's social impact and community investment program. Modern Healthcare recognized her as one of the top 25 minority executives in healthcare in 2018.

Davis co-authored Changing Missions, Changing Lives: How a Change Agent Can Turn the Ship and Create Impact (ForbesBooks, 2020). She has received the 2016 Corporate Sector Award from the New Jersey Women Lawyers Association and has been named the 2014 Business Advocate of the Year by the New Jersey Hispanic Chamber of Commerce, and one of the 25 most influential Black women in business nationally by The Network Journal in 2014. She has served on the boards of the Essex County College, Sacred Heart University, Rowan University, and The Fund for New Jersey.

In 2021, Davis became CEO of the National Medical Fellowships, which provides scholarships and support for underrepresented students in medicine and the health professions.
