= William T. Read =

American politician (1878-1954)

William Thackara Read (November 22, 1878 – August 7, 1954) was an American lawyer and politician from New Jersey.

== Read ==
Read was born on November 22, 1878, in Camden, New Jersey, the son of William Thackara Read and Lucretia Swindell McCormick.

Read attended the Camden public schools and the William Penn Charter School in Philadelphia, Pennsylvania. He graduated from the University of Pennsylvania with a B.S. in 1900. He attended the University of Pennsylvania Law School and studied in the law office of former State Comptroller J. Willard Morgan. He was admitted to the bar as an attorney in 1903 and as a counselor in 1906. He then opened a law office in Camden and became solicitor of First National Bank of Camden and the Mutual Building and Loan Association of Camden. He was also Solicitor of the borough of Riverton and the township of Voorhees, and for eight years he was District Examiner of the Camden Board of Education. In 1909, he became second lieutenant of the Third Regiment of the New Jersey National Guard and assigned to the First Battalion as quartermaster and commissary. An expert rifleman, he was a member of the Third Regiment Rifle Team from 1910 to 1911. In 1915 Adjutant General Sadler appointed him to his staff as a major. He became a lieutenant colonel on the staff of General Spencer in 1917, and in 1918 he became colonel.

In 1911, Read was elected to the New Jersey Senate as a Republican, representing Camden County. He served in the Senate in 1912, 1913, 1914, 1915, and 1916. He was Minority Leader of the Senate in 1913 and 1914, Majority Leader of the Senate in 1915, and President of the Senate in 1916. He resigned from the Senate in 1916 to became State Treasurer, an office he held until retired in 1928. He became trustee of the State Teachers Pension and Annuity Fund in 1930, serving two terms in that position until he resigned to become a member of the board of control of the State Department of Institutions and Agencies. He resigned from that position in 1953. He was a delegate to the 1947 New Jersey State Constitutional Convention. He was Camden County Treasurer from 1941 to 1945, and when he died he was chairman of the board of the Camden Fire Insurance Association. By the time he died, he lived in Merchantville. He was also a delegate to the 1932, 1936, 1940, and 1944 Republican National Conventions.

Read was vice-president of the First National Bank and director of the West Jersey Trust Co. of Camden and the Colestown Cemetery Co. He was a member of the American Bar Association, the New Jersey State Bar Association, the Camden County Bar Association, the American Academy of Political and Social Science, the Philadelphia Club, the Army and Navy Club, the Freemasons, the Knights Templar, and the Sons of the American Revolution. In 1903, he married Florence Atmore. Their children were William T. Jr., Walter N., and Edith. He attended the Grace Episcopal Church in Merchantville.

Read died from a stroke in Cooper Hospital on August 7, 1954. He was buried in the family crypt in Colestown Cemetery.

Political offices
Preceded by Walter E. Edge	President of the New Jersey Senate; 1916	Succeeded by George W. F. Gaunt
Preceded by Edward Everett Grosscup	Treasurer of New Jersey; 1916–1928	Succeeded by Albert Middleton
