= Daniel Spader Voorhees =

American government official

Daniel Spader Voorhees Jr.

New Jersey State Treasurer
- In office 1907–1913
- Governor: Edward Casper Stokes
- Preceded by: Frank Obadiah Briggs
- Succeeded by: Edward Everett Grosscup

Personal details
- Born: August 15, 1852 Somerville, New Jersey
- Died: August 12, 1935 (aged 82) Morristown, New Jersey
- Spouse: Frances L. White
- Parents: Daniel Spader Voorhees, Sr.; Mary Louise Compton Doty

Daniel Spader Voorhees Jr. (August 15, 1852 – August 12, 1935) was the New Jersey State Treasurer from 1907 to 1913. He was the superintendent of Greystone Park Psychiatric Hospital.

== Biography ==
He was born on August 15, 1852, in Somerville, New Jersey, to Daniel Spader Voorhees, Sr. and Mary Louise Compton Doty.

On January 18, 1874, he married Frances L. White (born January 18, 1856). She was the daughter of Margaret and William W. White of New Brunswick, New Jersey.

In 1898 he was elected county clerk of Morris County. The New Jersey Senate convened on February 14, 1907, and appointed him as the New Jersey State Treasurer for a term of three years, to succeed Frank Obadiah Briggs. He started his term on March 1, 1907, and in 1910 was re-elected and served until 1913. He was succeeded by Edward Everett Grosscup.

He died on August 12, 1935, in Morristown, New Jersey.
