= Edward Everett Grosscup =

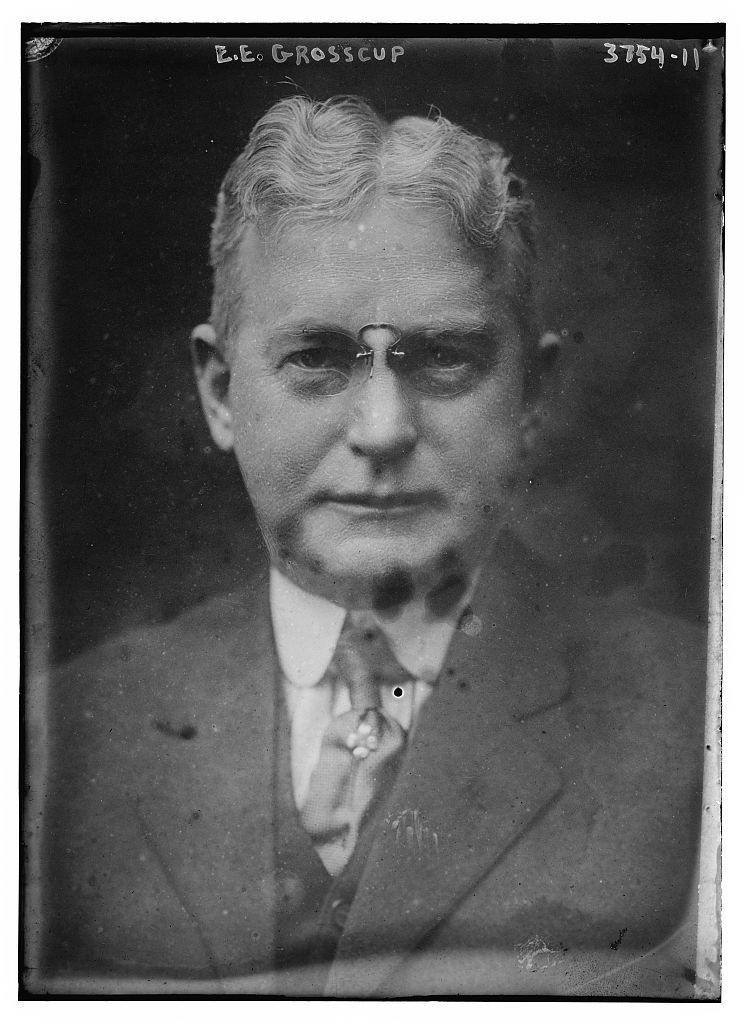

Treasurer of the State of New Jersey
- In office 1913–1916
- Governor: Woodrow Wilson
- Preceded by: Daniel Spader Voorhees
- Succeeded by: William T. Read

Personal details
- Born: August 2, 1860 Bridgeton, New Jersey
- Died: December 16, 1933 (aged 73) Philadelphia, Pennsylvania

Edward Everett Grosscup (August 2, 1860 – December 16, 1933) was chairman of the New Jersey Democratic State Committee from 1911 to 1919 and Treasurer of the State of New Jersey from 1913 to 1915. In 1916 he became the New Jersey state purchasing agent.

== Biography ==
He was born on August 2, 1860, in Bridgeton, New Jersey, to Charles Christopher Grosscup and Anna Dare Hires.

He married Sarah E. Finlaw (1858–1884) on October 19, 1881, in Camden, New Jersey, and had as their child, Walter Truman Grosscup (1883–1950).

After the death of his first wife he married Anna Josephine Swaney (1861–1907) on July 10, 1885, in Camden and had as their children: George Charles Grosscup (1887–1936), and Ethel Amanda Grosscup (1891–1949).

Grosscup had made an unsuccessful run in Cumberland County for sheriff in 1896, and lost a race for a seat in the New Jersey Senate in 1898 to Edward C. Stokes, a Republican who would later be elected as Governor. He moved to Gloucester County in 1899, settling in Wenonah, later making an unsuccessful run for Congress, opposing Henry Clay Loudenslager.

He was elected Treasurer of the State of New Jersey in 1913 replacing Daniel Spader Voorhees. He married for a third time, Florence Steele (born 1895) on June 17, 1914.

He became the state purchasing agent for New Jersey on March 21, 1916.

He died on December 16, 1933, in Philadelphia, Pennsylvania, at age 73.
