= Frank Pelzman =

American politician

20th Mayor of Woodbridge Township
- In office January 17, 2002 – June 29, 2006
- Preceded by: Jim McGreevey
- Succeeded by: Joe Vitale

Personal details
- Born: Frank George Pelzman; November 13, 1934 Newark, New Jersey, U.S.
- Died: June 29, 2006 (aged 71) Avenel, New Jersey, U.S.
- Party: Democratic
- Spouse: Dorothy

Military service
- Allegiance: United States
- Branch/service: United States Army
- Years of service: 1955–1957

Frank George Pelzman (November 13, 1934 – June 29, 2006) was the former Mayor of Woodbridge Township, New Jersey. A long time member of the township council, Pelzman became mayor in 2002, after Jim McGreevey resigned to become Governor of New Jersey. Pelzman was elected by the Township Council in January 2002 to serve until the November 2002 special election for mayor, which he won. He was elected to a full four-year term as mayor in 2003. He died of cancer in June 2006, a month after being diagnosed. Since he was a supporter of outdoor youth recreation, a park was dedicated in his name on October 19, 2006.

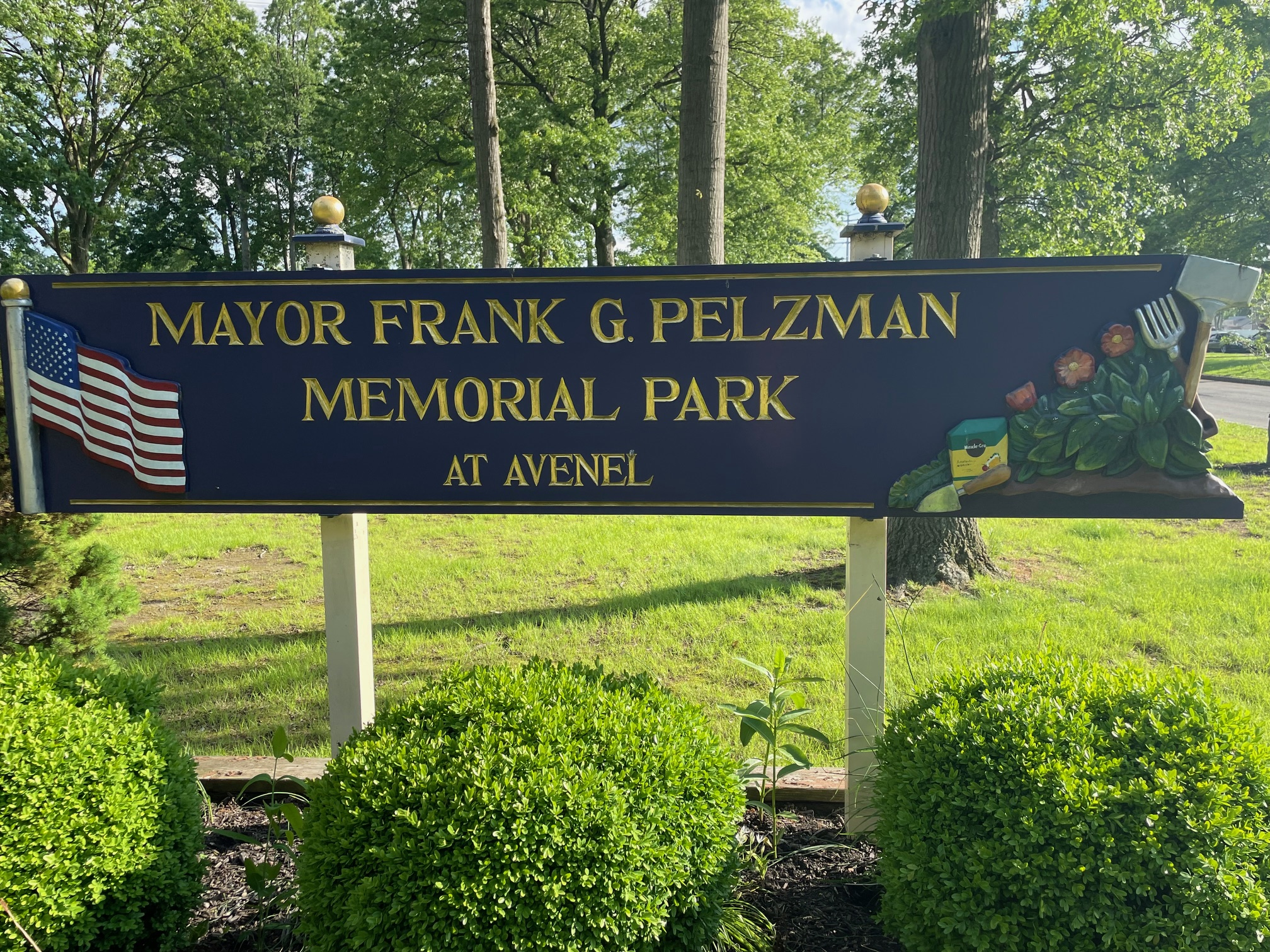
Mayor Frank G. Pelzman Memorial Park at Avenel, New Jersey
