= Franklin C. McLean =

Dr. Franklin C. McLean
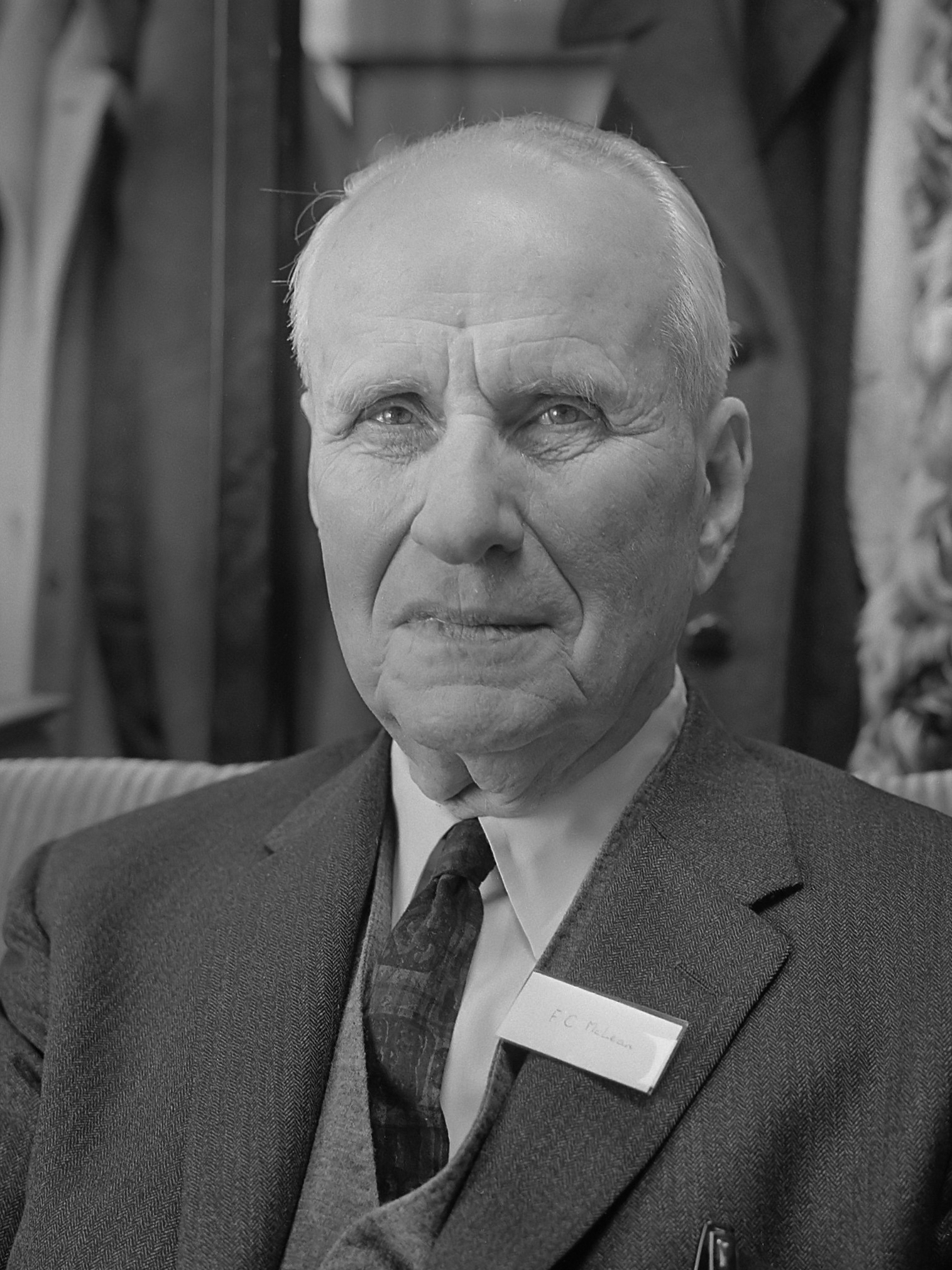
- Franklin Chambers McLean (1966)
- Born: Franklin Chambers McLean; February 29, 1888; Maroa, Illinois
- Died: September 10, 1968 (aged 80); Chicago, Illinois
- Occupation: American Physician
- Known for: • University of Chicago Medical Clinics -Director, Professor & Chairman for the Department of Medicine • National Medical Fellowships -Founder • The Franklin C. McLean Scholarship Award

Franklin Chambers McLean (1888 - September 10, 1968) was a Professor and Chairman of the Department of Medicine and the first appointed Director of the University of Chicago Medical Clinics, as well as the founder of the National Medical Fellowships. He aided the Manhattan Project by studying effects of radiation on organisms. He was also a trustee of the Julius Rosenwald Fund and Fisk University.

McLean was also a founder of the Peking Union Medical College. He was instrumental in solving complex social and ethical issues during the era of discrimination and segregation in the United States. A scholarship has been established in his name - the Franklin C. McLean Award. This award is given to medical students of minority background.

== Early life ==
McLean was born February 29, 1888, in Maroa, Illinois. The son and grandson of physicians, he received a B.S. degree from the University of Chicago in 1907, his M.D. from Rush Medical College in 1910, his M.S. degree in 1912 and his Ph.D. degree in 1915. Among his teachers was Anton Julius Carlson. During graduate studies he interned at Cook County Hospital, studied at the University of Graz as well as Vienna, along with several other responsibilities. While in China, he met a fellow medical doctor named Helen Vincent whom he married in 1923.

== Early career ==
McLean became a professor of pharmacology and materia medica in 1911 at the University of Oregon. He stayed in this position until 1914. He then moved on to assistant resident at the Hospital of the Rockefeller Institute for Medical Research in New York. In 1916 the Rockefeller Foundation sponsored his trips to China to found the Peking Union Medical College. He was appointed Director of the college, but did not stay for any length of time until 1920 due to his active army duty during World War I. In 1919 he returned to plan the layout of buildings and medical laboratories that were completed in 1921. McLean resigned his administrative duties in 1920, but remained chairman and professor of medicine until 1923, upon returning to the U.S.

== University of Chicago ==
In 1923 McLean was invited to direct the new medical school envisioned by the University of Chicago and set forth planning, overseeing and raising the funds necessary. The medical school opened in 1927. McLean served as its first vice-chairman of the faculty and the chairman of the Department of Medicine. In 1929 he resigned the department chair so as to assume the title of Director of University Clinics and Assistant to the President in Medical Affairs. In 1932 he was forced to resign, leaving behind all administrative duties. He easily shifted back to his research and continued to make many advancements in medicine. McLean was made Professor Emeritus in 1953, but continued his work, which included publishing.

== Death ==
McLean died on September 10, 1968, at the former Billings Hospital in Chicago, Illinois.

== Notable works ==
- Bone: An introduction to the physiology of skeletal tissue, (The Scientist's library: Biology and medicine) by Franklin C McLean. Chicago U.P. (1st ed 1955; 3rd ed 1968 ISBN 0-226-56073-2)
- Radioisotopes and bone: a symposium organized by the Council for International Organizations of Medical Sciences established under the joint auspices of UNESCO & WHO. Edited under the direction of Franklin C. McLean by P. Lacroix & Ann M. Bundy. Blackwell (1962)
- Calcium and phosphorus metabolism in man and animals with special reference to pregnancy and lactation. Conference chairman Franklin C. McLean, organizing chairman and consulting editor Robert R. Marshak. Annals of the New York Academy of Sciences v.64, art.30 (1956)
