= New Jersey Department of the Treasury =

State agency of New Jersey, United States

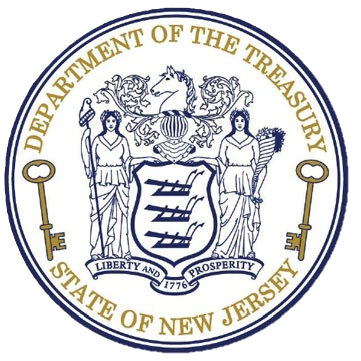
- Seal of the NJ Treasury Department

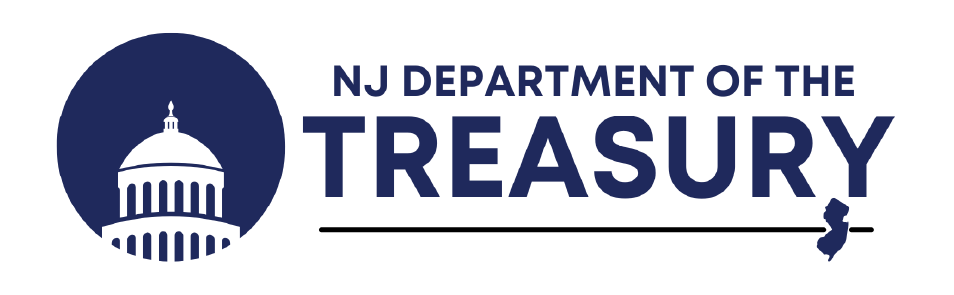
- Logo of the NJ Treasury Department

Department overview
- Formed: July 1, 1948; 78 years ago
- Preceding department: Department of Taxation and Finance
- Jurisdiction: Government of New Jersey
- Headquarters: New Jersey State House 125 West State Street, Trenton, New Jersey
- Annual budget: US$5.7 billion (FY2027)
- Department executives: Aaron Binder, State Treasurer; Kavin K. Mistry, Deputy State Treasurer
- Website: nj.gov/treasury

The mission of the New Jersey Department of the Treasury is to formulate and manage the state's budget, generate and collect revenues, disburse the appropriations used to operate New Jersey state government, manage the state's physical and financial assets, and provide statewide support services to state and local government agencies as well as the citizens of New Jersey. The department's overriding goal is to ensure the most beneficial use of fiscal resources and revenues to meet critical needs, all within a policy framework set by the governor.

The Office of the State Treasurer is one of the oldest units of New Jersey state government, the first treasurer named in 1776, following adoption of the first Constitution of New Jersey.

== State treasurers of New Jersey ==
- John Stevens, 1776 to 1779
- James Mott, 1783 to 1799
- Stacy A. Paxon, 1845 to 1847
- David Naar, 1865
- Gershom Mott, 1875
- John J. Toffey, 1875 to 1891
- George B. Swain, 1894 to 1901
- Frank O. Briggs, 1902 to 1907
- Daniel Spader Voorhees, 1907 to 1913
- Edward Everett Grosscup, 1913 to 1916
- William T. Read, 1916 to 1928
- Albert Middleton, 1928
- Robert C. Hendrickson, 1942 to January 1949
- John J. Dickerson, January 1949 to April 1949
- Walter Margetts, April 1949 to January 1954
- Archibald S. Alexander, January 1954 to May 1957
- Aaron Neeld, May 1957 to July 1958
- John Kervick, July 1958 to January 1970
- Katharine Elkus White, 1961 (Acting)
- William Marfuggi, January 1973 to January 1974
- Richard Leone, January 1974 to December 1976
- Clifford Goldman, December 1976 to January 1982
- Kenneth Biederman, January 1982 to March 1984
- Michael Horn, March 1984 to January 1986
- Feather O'Conner, January 1986 to January 1990
- Douglas Berman, January 1990 to January 1992
- Samuel Crane, January 1992 to January 1994
- Brian Clymer, January 1994 to June 1997
- James DiEleuterio, July 1997 to August 1999
- Ronald Machold, August 1999 to January 2001
- Isabel Miranda, January 2001 (Acting)
- Peter Lawrance, February 2001 to January 2002
- John McCormac, January 2002 to January 2006
- Bradley Abelow, January 2006 to August 2007
- Michellene Davis, September 2007 to January 2008 (Acting)
- David Rousseau, January 2008 to January 2010
- Andrew Sidamon-Eristoff, January 2010 to July 2015 (Acting until March 2010)
- Robert Romano, July 2015 to November 2015 (Acting)
- Ford Scudder, November 2015 to January 2018 (Acting until September 2016)
- Liz Muoio, January 2018 to January 2026 (Acting until April 2018)
- Aaron Binder, January 2026 to present

== Commission on Science, Innovation and Technology ==
In August 2018, Governor Phil Murphy signed legislation re-establishing the former New Jersey Commission on Science and Technology, which was originally created in 1985 and became non-operational in 2010. The revitalized commission was established in, but not of, the Department of the Treasury. He named Beth Simone Noveck as chief innovation officer.

== Related legislation ==
- 1948: Department of the Treasury Act of 1948, P.L. 1948, c. 92

== See also ==
- List of company registers
