= Benjamin F. Howell =

American politician

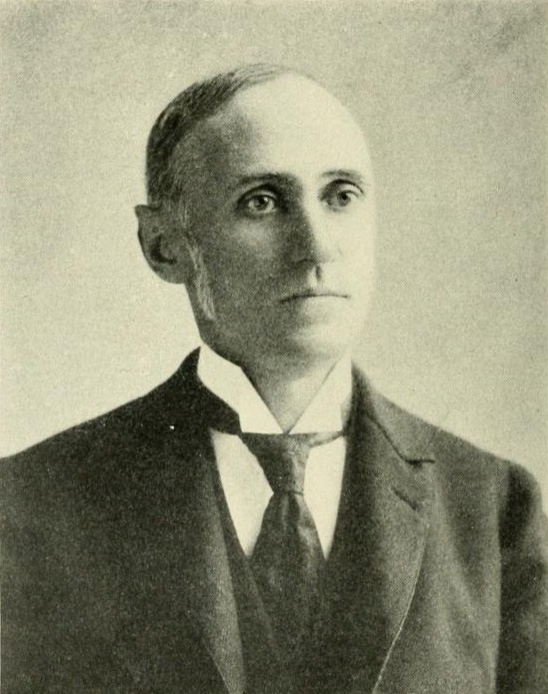

Member of the U.S. House of Representatives from New Jersey's 3rd district
- In office March 4, 1895 – March 3, 1911
- Preceded by: Jacob Augustus Geissenhainer
- Succeeded by: Thomas J. Scully

Personal details
- Born: Benjamin Franklin Howell; January 27, 1844 Cedarville, New Jersey
- Died: February 1, 1933 (aged 89) New Brunswick, New Jersey
- Resting place: Christ Cemetery, South Amboy, New Jersey
- Party: Republican
- Profession: Politician

Benjamin Franklin Howell (January 27, 1844 – February 1, 1933) was an American banker and Civil War veteran who served eight terms as a Republican Party politician, representing New Jersey's 3rd congressional district in the United States House of Representatives from 1895 to 1911.

== Early life and education ==
Born in Cedarville, New Jersey, Howell attended the common schools, and graduated from Fort Edward Institute, New York.

=== Civil War ===
He enlisted in the Twelfth Regiment, New Jersey Volunteers, in 1862 and served until the close of the war.

=== Early career ===
He engaged in mercantile pursuits in South Amboy, New Jersey, 1865 and was named to the Township Committee, and served as Surrogate of Middlesex County from 1882 to 1892. He served as president of the People's National Bank of New Brunswick, vice president of the New Brunswick Savings Institution, and was a founder and vice president of the First National Bank of South Amboy (now known as Amboy Bank).

== Congress ==
Howell was elected as a Republican to the Fifty-fourth and to the seven succeeding Congresses, serving in office from March 4, 1895 to March 3, 1911. He served as chairman of the Committee on Immigration and Naturalization (Fifty-eighth through Sixty-first Congresses). He was an unsuccessful candidate for reelection in 1910 to the Sixty-second Congress.

He served as a delegate to the 1896 Republican National Convention. He served as a member of the United States Immigration Commission 1907–1910.

== Death ==
He died at the age of 89 at his home in New Brunswick, New Jersey, February 1, 1933, and was interred in Christ Cemetery, South Amboy, New Jersey.

U.S. House of Representatives
Preceded by Jacob A. Geissenhainer	Member of the U.S. House of Representatives from New Jersey's 3rd congressional district March 4, 1895-March 3, 1911	Succeeded by Thomas J. Scully
