= Cardinal McCarrick High School =

Defunct Catholic high school in Middlesex County, New Jersey, United States

Location
- 310 Augusta Street; South Amboy, (Middlesex County), New Jersey 08879
- 40°28′57″N 74°17′3″W

Information
- Type: Private, Coeducational
- Religious affiliation: Roman Catholic
- Established: 1885
- Status: Defunct
- Closed: June 2015
- Oversight: Diocese of Metuchen
- Principal: Karen Juliano
- Chaplain: John Gordon
- Faculty: 25.6 (on FTE basis)
- Grades: 9–12
- Enrollment: 328 (2009-10)
- Student to teacher ratio: 12.8:1
- Colors: Blue and Gold
- Sports: Basketball, Football, Baseball, Soccer, Tennis, Bowling, Track and Field, Softball, Golf, Cheerleading, Cross Country
- Team name: Eagles
- Rival: South Amboy Middle High School
- Accreditation: Middle States Association of Colleges and Schools
- Publication: Reflections (literary magazine)
- Newspaper: The Eagle Press
- Website: cardinalmccarrick.com at the Wayback Machine (archive index)

Cardinal McCarrick High School (CMHS), later known as Cardinal McCarrick/St. Mary's High School, was a Catholic secondary school located in South Amboy, New Jersey, that operated under the supervision of the Roman Catholic Diocese of Metuchen. The school closed at the end of the 2014–15 school year, in the wake of an increasing financial deficit.

As of the 2009–10 school year, the school had an enrollment of 328 students and 25.6 classroom teachers (on an FTE basis), for a student–teacher ratio of 12.8:1.

== Description ==
The school said its goal was to help to ensure that each CMHS student continues to reach their potential during high school. Initiatives to advance this goal included a College Advisory Program, a Formalized Academic Support Program, an Enhanced College Testing Program, Distance Learning Opportunities, and an Interdisciplinary Honors Program.

== History ==
The school was founded in 1885 by Saint Mary's parish, and included grades one to eleven. It was expanded to include the twelfth grade in 1918, was accredited as Saint Mary's High School in 1919, and the first graduating class was in 1922. The original building was destroyed by a fire and a new school building that opened in 1968 was built in its place.

During the late 1980s, the high school went from being a parish high school to a diocesan high school, separating completely from the now-defunct St. Mary Elementary School (K-8). As a result of the change the high school went through several name changes, including St. Mary Regional High School (1988–2000), St. Mary Diocesan High School (2000–2001). On June 11, 2001, then Diocese of Metuchen Bishop Vincent Breen announced that Saint Mary's would close and reopen under a new name the following fall. In September 2001, the school was named Cardinal McCarrick High School, in honor of Theodore Edgar McCarrick, the first bishop of the Diocese of Metuchen.

Also in fall of 2001, the school opened a local branch of a credit union called the Eagle's Nest.

The high school had a partnership with Saint Peter's University of Jersey City to serve as a satellite campus for their graduate studies.

In 2013, the school, along with Sacred Heart Elementary School, joined the umbrella organization Raritan Bay Catholic Preparatory School.

== Athletics ==
The Cardinal McCarrick High School Eagles competed in the Greater Middlesex Conference, which includes public and private high schools located in the greater Middlesex County area. The league operates under the supervision of the New Jersey State Interscholastic Athletic Association (NJSIAA).

The boys basketball team won the NJSIAA Parochial South B championship in 2003, defeating Wildwood Catholic High School, 67–51. The 2005 team repeated the feat with a 75–56 win over Holy Spirit High School in the tournament final.

The girls bowling team won the Group I state championship in 2012 and 2013.

Sports included:
Fall
Varsity Soccer (Boys and Girls)
Varsity Cross Country (Boys and Girls)
Varsity Tennis (Girls)
Varsity and JV Football
Varsity Cheerleading

Winter
Varsity and JV Cheerleading
Freshman, Varsity and JV Basketball (Boys)
Varsity and JV Basketball (Girls)
Varsity Bowling (Boys and Girls)

Spring
Varsity Track and Field (Boys and Girls)
Freshman, Varsity and JV Baseball (Boys)
Varsity and JV Softball (Girls)
Varsity Golf (Boys and Girls)

== Notable alumni ==
- Allie Clark (1923-2012), baseball player for the New York Yankees and World Series winner.
- Tom Kelly (born 1950), Minnesota Twins Manager and World Series Winner.
- Matt Loughlin, sportscaster who is the radio play-by-play voice of the New Jersey Devils of the National Hockey League on WFAN.
- Jack McKeon (born 1930), Florida Marlins Manager and World Series winner.
- Johnny O'Brien (born 1930), former professional baseball player.
- Eddie O'Brien (born 1930), former professional baseball player.
- James T. Phillips (1953–2014), politician who served in the New Jersey Senate andas mayor of Old Bridge Township, New Jersey
- Marques Townes (born 1995), basketball player for the Loyola Ramblers men's basketball team, who transferred out of Cardinal McCarrick after his sophomore year.

== Closing ==
The Cardinal McCarrick school closed its doors as of June 2015. The Cardinal himself resigned that rank in July 2018 (reverting to Archbishop) and was laicized in February, 2019.

Bishop Ahr High School (now St. Thomas Aquinas High School) accepted its former students; Ahr and the former McCarrick had the same tuition prices.
