= Stewart Appleby =

Stewart Appleby may refer to:

- Stewart H. Appleby (1890–1964), U.S. Representative from New Jersey
- Stuart Appleby (born 1971), Australian golfer
