= Johnny O'Brien =

American baseball player (1930–2025)

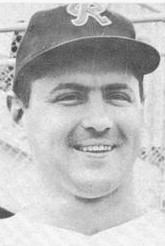
- O'Brien with 1960 Seattle Rainiers
- Second baseman / Pitcher
- Born: December 11, 1930; South Amboy, New Jersey, U.S.
- Died: June 13, 2025 (aged 94); Seattle, Washington, U.S.
- Batted: Right Threw: Right

MLB debut
- April 19, 1953, for the Pittsburgh Pirates

Last MLB appearance
- July 19, 1959, for the Milwaukee Braves

MLB statistics
- Batting average: .250
- Home runs: 4
- Runs batted in: 59
- Win–loss record: 1–3
- Earned run average: 5.61
- Strikeouts: 30
- Stats at Baseball Reference

Teams
- Pittsburgh Pirates (1953, 1955–1958); St. Louis Cardinals (1958); Milwaukee Braves (1959)

John Thomas O'Brien (December 11, 1930 – June 13, 2025) was an American second baseman and pitcher in Major League Baseball who played for the Pittsburgh Pirates (1953, 1955–58), St. Louis Cardinals (1958) and Milwaukee Braves (1959). O'Brien batted and threw right-handed. His twin brother, Eddie, was also a major league infielder. In college, O'Brien was an All-American basketball player for Seattle University.

== Early life ==
O'Brien attended Saint Mary's High School in South Amboy (since renamed as Cardinal McCarrick High School), where he had been inducted into the school's sports hall of fame. After high school, he and his brother, Eddie, tried out for the basketball team at Seton Hall University but were rejected and went to work in a toilet factory. While playing in a national semiprofessional baseball tournament, they caught the attention of an opposing first baseman, Al Brightman, who coached basketball and baseball at Seattle University.

O'Brien and his twin attended Seattle University, where they played both for the Chieftains baseball and basketball teams. O'Brien scored 43 points in a stunning 84–81 upset over the Harlem Globetrotters on January 21, 1952. In 1953, O'Brien became the first player in NCAA history to score 1,000 points in a season. That same year, the 5 ft 9 in (1.75 m) O'Brien became the shortest player to be named an All-American (in 2016, Kentucky's Tyler Ulis matched the feat).

To this day, O'Brien dominates the Seattle University scoring record book, ranking first in career points (2,733), second in career scoring average (25.8, trailing Basketball Hall-of-Famer Elgin Baylor), first in field goals made (904), second in field goals attempted (1,707), and first in free throws made and attempted (925 and 1,195).

He and Eddie were drafted by the Milwaukee Hawks in the 1953 NBA Draft, but both opted to play professional baseball, signing with the Pittsburgh Pirates.

== Baseball career ==
In a six-season MLB career, O'Brien was a .250 hitter (204-for-815) with four home runs and 59 RBI in 339 games played. From 1956 to 1958, he also doubled as a pitcher, appearing in 25 games (all but one in relief) and 61 innings, surrendering 61 hits, walking 30 and striking out 35. He lost three of four decisions (.250) with an earned run average of 5.61.

While in Pittsburgh, Johnny and Eddie O'Brien became the second set of twins in major league history to play for the same team in the same game. They are also one of only four brother combinations to play second base/shortstop on the same major league club. The others are Garvin and Granny Hamner, for the Philadelphia Phillies in 1945; Frank and Milt Bolling, with the Detroit Tigers in 1958, and Billy and Cal Ripken, for the Baltimore Orioles during the 1980s.

O'Brien spent 1960 back in the city of his college glory days, playing for the Seattle Rainers, the Cincinnati Reds' Triple A affiliate.

== Later life and death ==
In retirement, O'Brien worked variously as a city councilman in Seattle, a sportscaster of Seattle University basketball games along with Keith Jackson, the head of security, sales and promotions at the Kingdome and an energy consultant for the Alaskan shipping industry.

O'Brien served as a King County Commissioner (later Councilmember) from 1962 to 1973. He was preceded as commissioner by Robert M. Ford, and succeeded as District 5 councilmember by Ruby Chow.

On November 2, 1972, O'Brien was part of the groundbreaking ceremony to start construction at the Kingdome. Protestors attended the ceremony, upset about the impact of the stadium on the neighboring Chinatown-International District. O'Brien and King County Executive John Spellman were hit by mudballs thrown by some protestors. O'Brien later became the Kingdome's first operations manager. He retired in 1987.

O'Brien's grandson is St. Louis Cardinals pitcher Riley O'Brien. O'Brien died on June 13, 2025, at the age of 94.
