= South Amboy, New Jersey =

City in Middlesex County, New Jersey, US

- City
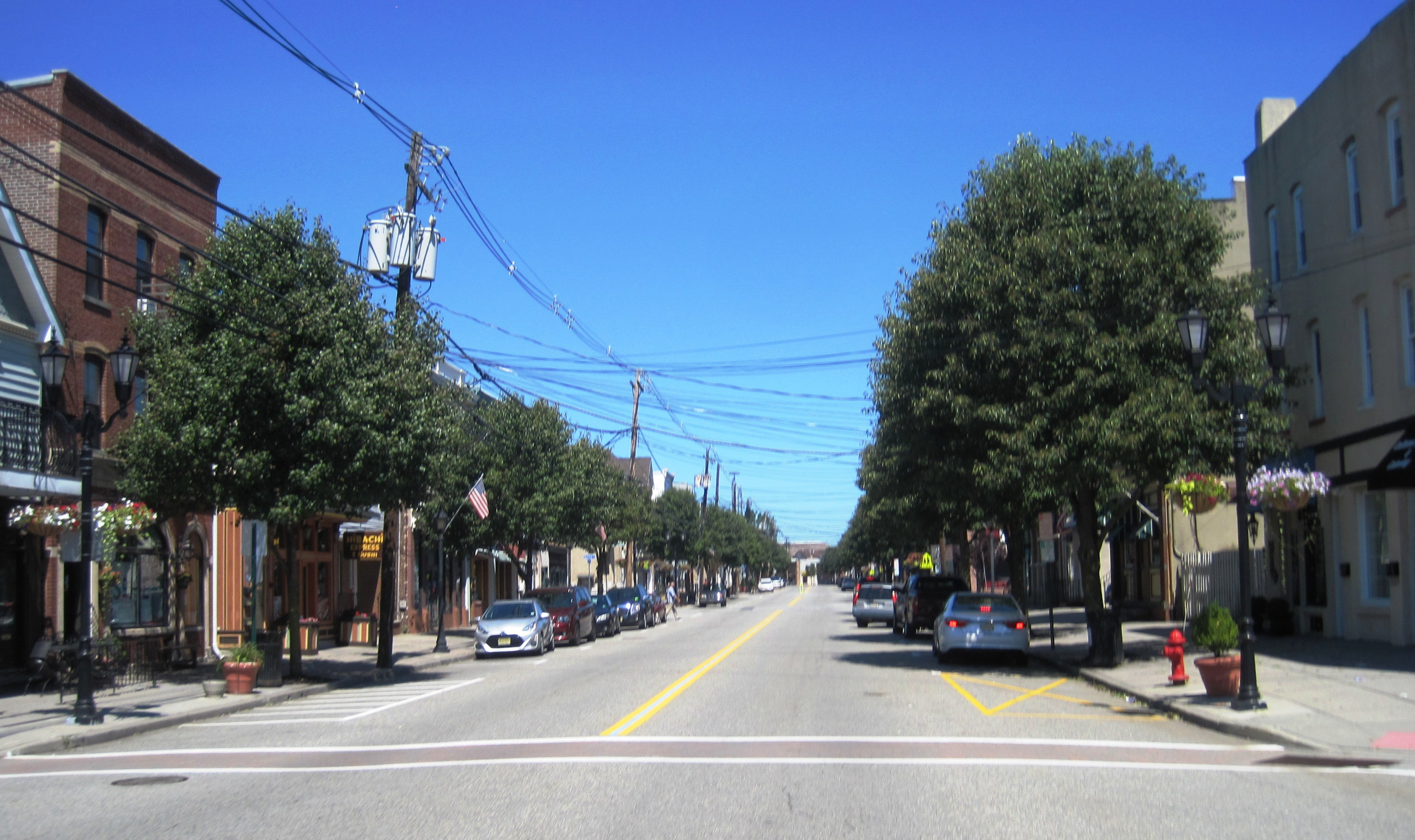
- Downtown South Amboy along Broadway

- Seal
- Nickname: "The Gateway to the Shore"
- Location of South Amboy in Middlesex County highlighted in red (left). Inset map: Location of Middlesex County in New Jersey highlighted in orange (right).

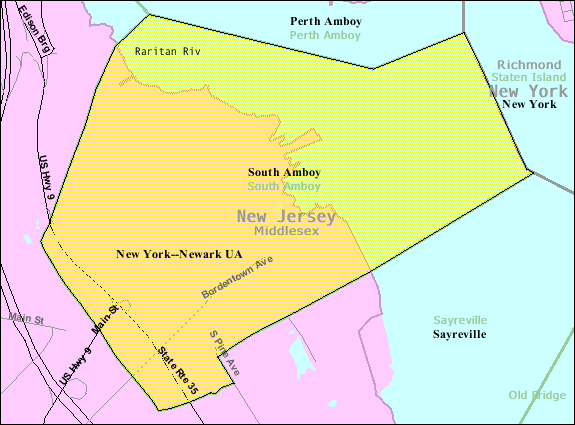
- Census Bureau map of South Amboy, New Jersey

- Location in Middlesex County Location in New Jersey Location in the United States
- Coordinates: 40°28′55″N 74°16′59″W
- Country: United States
- State: New Jersey
- County: Middlesex
- Incorporated: February 21, 1798

Government
  - Type: Faulkner Act (mayor–council)
  - Body: City Council
  - Mayor: Fred A. Henry (D, term ends December 31, 2026)
  - Administrator: David Kales
  - Municipal clerk: Deborah Brooks

Area
  - Total: 2.70 sq mi (6.99 km^{2})
  - Land: 1.54 sq mi (3.98 km^{2})
  - Water: 1.16 sq mi (3.01 km^{2}) 42.76%
  - Rank: 365th of 565 in state 19th of 25 in county
- Elevation: 9 ft (2.7 m)

Population (2020)
  - Total: 9,411
  - Estimate (2024): 10,549
  - Rank: 254th of 565 in state 19th of 25 in county
  - Density: 6,119/sq mi (2,363/km^{2})
  - Rank: 88th of 565 in state 6th of 25 in county
- Time zone: UTC−05:00 (Eastern (EST))
  - Summer (DST): UTC−04:00 (Eastern (EDT))
- ZIP Codes: 08879
- Area codes: 732 and 848
- FIPS code: 3402368550
- GNIS feature ID: 0885399
- Website: www.southamboynj.gov

South Amboy is a city in Middlesex County, in the U.S. state of New Jersey, located on Raritan Bay. As of the 2020 United States census, the city's population was 9,411, an increase of 780 (+9.0%) from the 2010 census count of 8,631, which in turn reflected an increase of 718 (+9.1%) from the 7,913 counted in the 2000 census.

South Amboy and Perth Amboy, across the Raritan River, are collectively referred to as The Amboys. Signage for exit 11 on the New Jersey Turnpike refers to "The Amboys" as a destination.

== History ==
First settled by the Lenape Native Americans, who called the area around Perth Amboy by the name "Ompoge" (meaning "level ground"), the settlement ultimately became a key port for commerce between Lower New York Bay and Philadelphia, connected first by stagecoach and eventually by railroad. The city was initially founded as a village by Dutch fishermen known as Radford's Ferry, but later become a key city to safeguard New Amsterdam from the British. When settled by Europeans in 1684, the city was named New Perth in honor of James Drummond, Earl of Perth, one of the associates of a company of Scottish proprietaries. The Algonquian language name was corrupted to Ambo, or Point Amboy, and eventually a combination of the native and colonial names was used. South Amboy is mentioned during the Revolutionary War in letters to and from George Washington referring to an "officer stationed on the South Amboy shore" and by General Washington himself writing that he was "now in Jersey" and suggesting the enemy "may proceed to South Amboy". Once known as Radford's Ferry, as well as the South Ward of Perth Amboy, South Amboy became one of the earliest townships around 1685 as well as one of the largest at 18 miles long and six miles wide.

In 1808, the first store was opened by Samuel Gordon. In 1831, Robert L. Stevens brought the steam engine "John Bull" to the Camden & Amboy Railroad. In 1832, Charles Moore became the town's first lawyer. In 1844, the first post office was established in the town. In 1852, the Swan Hill Pottery was established. Most of the town's churches were established between the 1850s-1880s. In 1880, the Great Beds Lighthouse is built offshore. In 1882, local newspaper "The Citizen" was established. In 1888, Amboy National Bank was established. In 1889, the oldest active fraternal organization, the Knights of Pythias Lodge was established. In 1890, a huge fire destroyed an entire city block of wooden houses on the east side of Broadway, which led to the establishment of the city's first fire station that same year. In 1912, the Woman's Club was formed. In 1912, New Jersey's first air mail flight was made between South Amboy and Perth Amboy. In 1914, the South Amboy Public Library was established. In 1919, the first public high school was established. In 1924, the South Amboy Hospital was built. In 1927, the Victory Bridge was built, connecting South Amboy to Perth Amboy. In 1931, the South Amboy First Aid Squad was established. In 1972, the library was rededicated as Sadie Pope Dowdell Public Library. In 1984, scenes for The Purple Rose of Cairo (1985) were filmed in South Amboy at the Raritan Diner. In 1991, the South Amboy-Sayreville Times newspaper was established. In 1993, the Amboy Beacon newspaper was established. Raritan Bay Waterfront Park opened in 1998. In 1999, filming for Coyote Ugly (2000) took place in South Amboy, where the film partially is set. In 2002, the South Amboy Neighborhood Preservation Program started. In 2002, the Seastreak Ferry service began. In 2004, South Amboy joined the New Jersey Main Street Program. In 2010, the YMCA and senior center opened.

South Amboy has passed through three of the five types of New Jersey municipalities. It was first mentioned on May 28, 1782, in minutes of the Board of Chosen Freeholders as having been formed from Perth Amboy Township. It was formally incorporated as a township by the Township Act of 1798 on February 21, 1798. Over the next 90 years, portions split off to form Monroe Township (April 9, 1838), Madison Township (March 2, 1869; later renamed as Old Bridge Township) and Sayreville Township (April 6, 1876; later Borough of Sayreville). Other modern municipalities included in these splits are Jamesburg, South Brunswick and Cranbury. As of February 25, 1888, South Amboy borough was formed, replacing South Amboy Township. On April 11, 1908, South Amboy was incorporated as a city, replacing South Amboy borough, confirmed by a referendum held on July 21, 1908.

=== Ammunition explosions ===
As a result of South Amboy's strategic location as a transportation hub, the city has been heavily damaged by military explosives in two major incidents. The 1918 explosions occurred during World War I at the Gillespie Shell Loading Plant, just south of the town. The 1950 explosion struck as Healing Lighterage Company dockworkers were transferring ammunition from a freight train onto barges. Both disasters killed dozens and injured hundreds of local victims, damaged hundreds of South Amboy buildings, required emergency declarations of martial law, and scattered wide areas of ammunition remnants that continue to surface occasionally.

== Geography ==
According to the United States Census Bureau, the city had a total area of 2.68 square miles (6.95 km^{2}), including 1.54 square miles (3.98 km^{2}) of land and 1.15 square miles (2.97 km^{2}) of water (42.76%). South Amboy is bordered by land with Sayreville to the south and west, by Perth Amboy to the north (across the Raritan River), and Staten Island to the east (across the Raritan Bay in New York City).

Area codes 732 and 848 are used in South Amboy. The city had been in area code 908, until January 1, 1997, when 908 was split forming area code 732. South Amboy has an enclave of apartments near Kohl's in Sayreville, whose residents use a South Amboy mailing address. The Melrose and Morgan sections of Sayreville and the Laurence Harbor section of Old Bridge also use the South Amboy Zip Code of 08879. Mechanicsville, White's Dock, and Thomas J. Dohany Homes are neighborhoods in the city.

== Demographics ==
As The New York Times said of South Amboy in 2000: "The population mix has not changed much since the beginning of the 20th century, when Irish and Polish immigrants came to work on the three railroads that crisscrossed the city." South Amboy remains a strong enclave of Polish ethnicity, including 21% of its population in the 2000 census, and the historic Sacred Heart Church and School.

Historical population
Census	Pop.	Note	%±
1790	2,626		—
1810	3,071		—
1820	3,406		10.9%
1830	3,782		11.0%
1840	1,825	*	−51.7%
1850	2,266		24.2%
1860	3,652		61.2%
1870	4,525	*	23.9%
1880	3,648	*	−19.4%
1890	4,330		18.7%
1900	6,349		46.6%
1910	7,007		10.4%
1920	7,897		12.7%
1930	8,476		7.3%
1940	7,802		−8.0%
1950	8,422		7.9%
1960	8,422		0.0%
1970	9,338		10.9%
1980	8,322		−10.9%
1990	7,863		−5.5%
2000	7,913		0.6%
2010	8,631		9.1%
2020	9,411		9.0%
2024 (est.)	10,549		12.1%
Population sources: 1790–1920; 1840 1850–1870 1850; 1870 1880–1890; 1890–1910 1910–1930; 1940–2000 2000; 2010 2020 * = Lost territory in previous decade.

=== 2020 census ===
As of the 2020 census, South Amboy had a population of 9,411. The median age was 40.9 years. 19.6% of residents were under the age of 18 and 16.6% of residents were 65 years of age or older. For every 100 females there were 96.2 males, and for every 100 females age 18 and over there were 93.3 males age 18 and over.

100.0% of residents lived in urban areas, while 0.0% lived in rural areas.

There were 3,740 households in South Amboy, of which 27.8% had children under the age of 18 living in them. Of all households, 41.3% were married-couple households, 21.4% were households with a male householder and no spouse or partner present, and 28.4% were households with a female householder and no spouse or partner present. About 29.1% of all households were made up of individuals and 12.6% had someone living alone who was 65 years of age or older.

There were 3,906 housing units, of which 4.2% were vacant. The homeowner vacancy rate was 2.0% and the rental vacancy rate was 4.4%.

Racial composition as of the 2020 census
Race	Number	Percent
White	6,399	68.0%
Black or African American	582	6.2%
American Indian and Alaska Native	40	0.4%
Asian	474	5.0%
Native Hawaiian and Other Pacific Islander	2	0.0%
Some other race	895	9.5%
Two or more races	1,019	10.8%
Hispanic or Latino (of any race)	2,093	22.2%

=== 2010 census ===
The 2010 United States census counted 8,631 people, 3,372 households, and 2,256 families in the city. The population density was 5,577.1 per square mile (2,153.3/km^{2}). There were 3,576 housing units at an average density of 2,310.7 per square mile (892.2/km^{2}). The racial makeup was 86.42% (7,459) White, 4.43% (382) Black or African American, 0.10% (9) Native American, 4.03% (348) Asian, 0.00% (0) Pacific Islander, 2.99% (258) from other races, and 2.03% (175) from two or more races. Hispanic or Latino of any race were 13.42% (1,158) of the population.

Of the 3,372 households, 28.0% had children under the age of 18; 46.8% were married couples living together; 14.1% had a female householder with no husband present and 33.1% were non-families. Of all households, 26.7% were made up of individuals and 9.6% had someone living alone who was 65 years of age or older. The average household size was 2.56 and the average family size was 3.11.

20.8% of the population were under the age of 18, 8.6% from 18 to 24, 29.8% from 25 to 44, 29.5% from 45 to 64, and 11.3% who were 65 years of age or older. The median age was 39.3 years. For every 100 females, the population had 96.8 males. For every 100 females ages 18 and older there were 93.2 males.

The Census Bureau's 2006–2010 American Community Survey showed that (in 2010 inflation-adjusted dollars) median household income was $61,566 (with a margin of error of +/− $6,388) and the median family income was $80,815 (+/− $4,285). Males had a median income of $54,000 (+/− $5,767) versus $49,303 (+/− $4,574) for females. The per capita income for the borough was $31,590 (+/− $2,232). About 10.2% of families and 9.0% of the population were below the poverty line, including 15.7% of those under age 18 and 5.5% of those age 65 or over.

=== 2000 census ===
As of the 2000 United States census there were 7,913 people, 2,967 households, and 2,041 families residing in the city. The population density was 5,102.1 inhabitants per square mile (1,969.9/km^{2}). There were 3,110 housing units at an average density of 2,005.3 per square mile (774.3/km^{2}). The racial makeup of the city was 94.22% White, 0.86% African American, 0.19% Native American, 1.38% Asian, 0.03% Pacific Islander, 1.71% from other races, and 1.62% from two or more races. Hispanic or Latino of any race were 6.75% of the population.

There were 2,967 households, out of which 32.2% had children under the age of 18 living with them, 48.8% were married couples living together, 14.5% had a female householder with no husband present, and 31.2% were non-families. 25.9% of all households were made up of individuals, and 12.3% had someone living alone who was 65 years of age or older. The average household size was 2.65 and the average family size was 3.22.

In the city the population was spread out, with 24.3% under the age of 18, 7.7% from 18 to 24, 32.9% from 25 to 44, 21.5% from 45 to 64, and 13.6% who were 65 years of age or older. The median age was 37 years. For every 100 females, there were 95.5 males. For every 100 females age 18 and over, there were 92.0 males.

The median income for a household in the city was $50,529, and the median income for a family was $62,029. Males had a median income of $42,365 versus $29,737 for females. The per capita income for the city was $23,598. About 6.7% of families and 7.4% of the population were below the poverty line, including 10.6% of those under age 18 and 6.0% of those age 65 or over.

== Government ==
=== Local government ===
South Amboy is governed within the Faulkner Act, formally known as the Optional Municipal Charter Law, under the Mayor-Council system of municipal government. The city is one of 71 municipalities (of the 564) statewide governed under this form. The governing body is composed of the Mayor and the five-member City Council. The mayor is elected directly by the voters. The City Council includes five members, two of whom are elected on an at-large basis while three are elected from wards. All members of the governing body are elected in partisan elections to serve four-year terms of office on a staggered basis in even-numbered years as part of the November general election, with the three ward seats up for election together and the two at-large seats and the mayoral seat up for vote together two years later.

As of 2024, the Mayor of South Amboy is Democrat Fred Henry, whose term of office ends December 31, 2026. He announced in early 2026 that he would not be running for another term as mayor in the upcoming 2026 election. Members of the City Council are Council President Michael "Mickey" Gross (D, 2026; at-large), Anthony Conrad (D, 2026; at-large), Zusette Dato (D, 2028; Third Ward), Lawrence “Larry” Lenahan (D, 2028; First Ward) and Thomas B. Reilly (D, 2028; Second Ward).

In February 2015, the City Council appointed Thomas Reilly to fill the Second Ward expiring in December 2016 that became vacant when Christine Noble took office in an at-large seat. In the 2015 November general election, Reilly was elected to serve the balance of the term of office.

Following the death of Russell Stillwagon in June 2010, after serving nearly two decades on the City Council, Donald Applegate was chosen the following month by council members from among three names proposed to fill the vacancy representing the First Ward.

=== Federal, state and county representation ===
South Amboy is located in the 6th Congressional District and is part of New Jersey's 19th state legislative district.

For the 119th United States Congress, New Jersey's 6th congressional district is represented by Frank Pallone (D, Long Branch). New Jersey is represented in the United States Senate by Democrats Cory Booker (Newark, term ends 2027) and Andy Kim (Moorestown, term ends 2031).

For the 2026–2027 session, the 19th legislative district of the New Jersey Legislature is represented in the State Senate by Joe F. Vitale (D, Woodbridge Township) and in the General Assembly by Craig Coughlin (D, Woodbridge Township) and Yvonne Lopez (D, Perth Amboy).

Middlesex County is governed by a Board of County Commissioners, whose seven members are elected at-large on a partisan basis to serve three-year terms of office on a staggered basis, with either two or three seats coming up for election each year as part of the November general election. At an annual reorganization meeting held in January, the board selects from among its members a commissioner director and deputy director. As of 2025, Middlesex County's Commissioners (with party affiliation, term-end year, and residence listed in parentheses) are:

Director Ronald G. Rios (D, Carteret, 2027), Deputy Director Shanti Narra (D, North Brunswick, 2027), Claribel A. "Clary" Azcona-Barber (D, New Brunswick, 2025), Charles Kenny (D, Woodbridge Township, 2025), Leslie Koppel (D, Monroe Township, 2026), Chanelle Scott McCullum (D, Piscataway, 2025) and Charles E. Tomaro (D, Edison, 2026).

Constitutional officers are: Clerk Nancy Pinkin (D, 2025, East Brunswick), Sheriff Mildred S. Scott (D, 2025, Piscataway) and Surrogate Claribel Cortes (D, 2026; North Brunswick).

=== Politics ===
As of November 2018, there were a total of 5,876 registered voters in South Amboy, of which 2,948 (50.%) submitted ballots in the last General Election. Incumbent Mayor Fred Henry (1,490) secured his third term by defeating Republican candidate Peter Pisar (923) and independent amateur Brandon Russell (403). Of the 5,876 registered voters: 2,410 (41.0%) were registered as Democrats, 658 (11.2%) were registered as Republicans and 2,803 (47.7%) were registered as Unaffiliated. There were 3 voters registered as Libertarians or Greens.

United States presidential election results for South Amboy
Year	Republican		Democratic		Third party(ies)	
Year	No.	%	No.	%	No.	%
2024	2,399	54.56%	1,893	43.05%	105	2.39%
2020	2,155	50.96%	2,014	47.62%	60	1.42%
2016	1,870	53.40%	1,506	43.00%	126	3.60%
2012	1,373	42.68%	1,790	55.64%	54	1.68%
2008	1,722	47.04%	1,875	51.22%	64	1.75%
2008	1,566	46.24%	1,784	52.67%	37	1.09%
2000	949	34.75%	1,644	60.20%	138	5.05%

In the 2012 presidential election, Democrat Barack Obama received 55.6% of the vote (1,790 cast), ahead of Republican Mitt Romney with 42.7% (1,373 votes), and other candidates with 1.7% (54 votes), among the 3,269 ballots cast by the city's 5,491 registered voters (52 ballots were spoiled), for a turnout of 59.5%. In the 2008 presidential election, Democrat Barack Obama received 50.8% of the vote (1,875 cast), ahead of Republican John McCain with 46.6% (1,722 votes) and other candidates with 1.7% (64 votes), among the 3,693 ballots cast by the city's 5,382 registered voters, for a turnout of 68.6%. In the 2004 presidential election, Democrat John Kerry received 52.4% of the vote (1,784 ballots cast), outpolling Republican George W. Bush with 46.0% (1,566 votes) and other candidates with 0.7% (37 votes), among the 3,405 ballots cast by the city's 4,971 registered voters, for a turnout percentage of 68.5.

Gubernatorial election results for South Amboy
Year	Republican		Democratic		Third party(ies)	
Year	No.	%	No.	%	No.	%
2025	1,517	46.58%	1,718	52.75%	22	0.68%
2021	1,415	57.33%	1,032	41.82%	21	0.85%
2017	1,019	50.55%	945	46.88%	52	2.58%
2013	1,341	65.00%	689	33.40%	33	1.60%
2009	1,288	53.22%	865	35.74%	267	11.03%
2005	816	38.20%	1,033	48.36%	287	13.44%

In the 2013 gubernatorial election, Republican Chris Christie received 65.0% of the vote (1,341 cast), ahead of Democrat Barbara Buono with 33.4% (689 votes), and other candidates with 1.6% (33 votes), among the 2,104 ballots cast by the city's 5,486 registered voters (41 ballots were spoiled), for a turnout of 38.4%. In the 2009 gubernatorial election, Republican Chris Christie received 52.7% of the vote (1,288 ballots cast), ahead of Democrat Jon Corzine with 35.4% (865 votes), Independent Chris Daggett with 9.2% (226 votes) and other candidates with 1.7% (41 votes), among the 2,445 ballots cast by the city's 5,298 registered voters, yielding a 46.1% turnout.

United States Senate election results for South Amboy1
Year	Republican		Democratic		Third party(ies)	
Year	No.	%	No.	%	No.	%
2024	2,067	50.75%	1,875	46.03%	131	3.22%
2018	1,445	50.83%	1,274	44.81%	124	4.36%
2012	1,216	40.59%	1,693	56.51%	87	2.90%
2006	966	39.35%	1,356	55.23%	133	5.42%

United States Senate election results for South Amboy2
Year	Republican		Democratic		Third party(ies)	
Year	No.	%	No.	%	No.	%
2020	1,899	46.75%	2,015	49.61%	148	3.64%
2014	626	40.78%	881	57.39%	28	1.82%
2013	632	52.15%	568	46.86%	12	0.99%
2008	1,365	41.44%	1,832	55.62%	97	2.94%

== Education ==
The South Amboy Public Schools serve students in pre-kindergarten through twelfth grade. As of the 2020–21 school year, the district, comprised of two schools, had an enrollment of 1,100 students and 81.0 classroom teachers (on an FTE basis), for a student–teacher ratio of 13.6:1. Schools in the district (with 2020–21 enrollment data from the National Center for Education Statistics) are South Amboy Elementary School with 514 students in grades PreK-5 and South Amboy Middle High School with 559 students in grades 6-12.

Eighth grade students from all of Middlesex County are eligible to apply to attend the high school programs offered by the Middlesex County Magnet Schools, a county-wide vocational school district that offers full-time career and technical education at its schools in East Brunswick, Edison, Perth Amboy, Piscataway and Woodbridge Township, with no tuition charged to students for attendance.

Raritan Bay Catholic Preparatory—Sacred Heart School was a parochial elementary school opened in 1895 and serving Pre-K–3 to eighth grade that operated under the auspices of the Roman Catholic Diocese of Metuchen, until it was closed in June 2016 due to insufficient enrollment. Cardinal McCarrick High School closed at the end of the 2014–2015 school year, in the wake of an increasing financial deficit.

== Transportation ==
=== Roads and highways ===
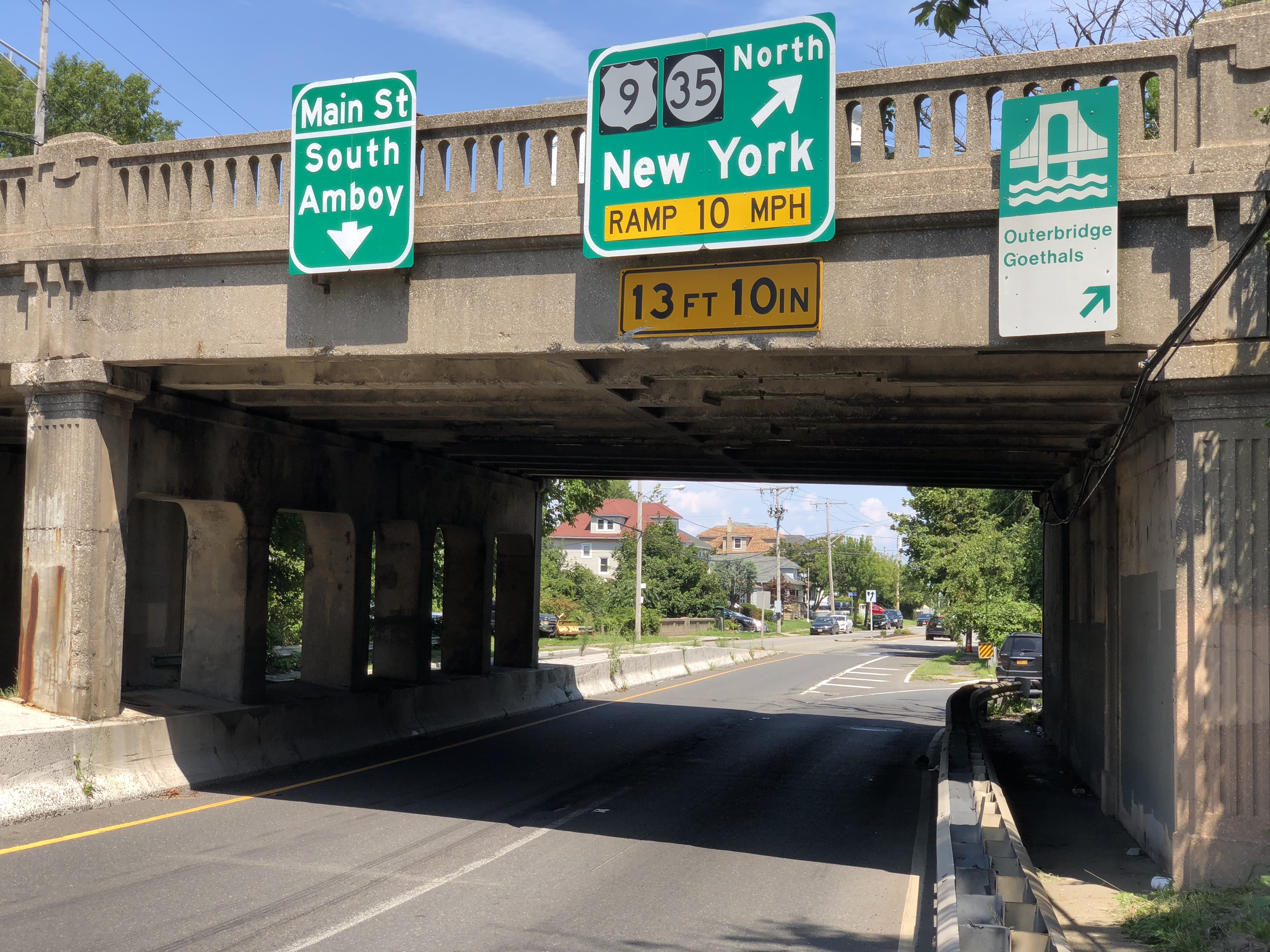
View north along US 9 at Route 35 in South Amboy

As of May 2010, the city had a total of 23.65 miles (38.06 km) of roadways, of which 18.73 miles (30.14 km) were maintained by the municipality, 3.50 miles (5.63 km) by Middlesex County, and 1.42 miles (2.29 km) by the New Jersey Department of Transportation.

Several major roads and highways traverse the city. These include portions of U.S. Route 9, Route 35 and CR 615, 621, 670, 684, 686 and 688. Three Garden State Parkway exits (123–125) are just beyond the city's western border.

=== Public transportation ===
The South Amboy station provides frequent service on NJ Transit's North Jersey Coast Line, with most northbound trains heading to Newark Penn Station, Secaucus Junction and New York Penn Station in Midtown Manhattan and some heading to Hoboken Terminal, while southbound trains all head to Bay Head.

NJ Transit local bus service is available on two routes. The 815 runs between New Brunswick and the Woodbridge Center, with stops in Woodbridge Township, Perth Amboy, Sayreville, South River. The 817 runs between Middletown and Perth Amboy, with stops in Keansburg, Hazlet, Union Beach, Keyport, Aberdeen Township, and Old Bridge Township.

Plans for the ferry service to Lower and Midtown Manhattan were announced in November 2018. In June 2020, the project received $5.3 million in federal funding for construction of a terminal near the train station. On October 30, 2023, the NY Waterway began service between South Amboy and Manhattan, with stops at Downtown (Brookfield Place/Battery Park City) and Midtown (W39th Street) at 100 Radford Ferry Road. Free local shuttles run between Sayreville and South Amboy with various current bus stops, as well as one at South Amboy Station. As of now, the ferry schedule is limited to Monday-Friday during mornings and evenings, each with four departures. Morning departures from South Amboy begin at 5:45AM and end at 8:45AM, with all trips arrive about 55 minutes to Brookfield Place, and only the last two going to Midtown, which arrives about 10 minutes later. There are no trips to South Amboy in the mornings. Evening departures from Manhattan only leave Midtown at 3:15PM and 4:15PM, while departures are at every hour from 3:30PM to 6:30PM at Brookfield Place. There are two return trips from South Amboy to Manhattan at 4:25PM and 5:25PM. The ferry includes free transfers to Weehawken, Hoboken, and Jersey City. The ferry offers tea, coffee, and refreshments on board. There is free parking by the ferry terminal. There is currently only a temporary terminal at the end of an abandoned industrial pier, but a $30 million dollar permanent facility is in the process of being built nearby with a planned opening in 2025.

The Raritan River Railroad provided passenger service to the city from 1888 to 1938. The railroad is now defunct along this part of the line. Proposals have been made to use the line as a light rail route.

== Notable people ==
People who were born in, residents of, or otherwise closely associated with South Amboy include:

- Don Campbell (1916–1991), tackle who played for two NFL seasons
- Allie Clark (1923–2012), champion of the 1947 & 1948 World Series
- Richard Field Conover (1858–1930), tennis player, lawyer and real estate manager
- Craig Coughlin (born 1958), New Jersey General Assembly member who has represented the 19th Legislative District since 2010
- Greg Evigan (born 1953), actor best known for appearing on the TV series B. J. and the Bear and My Two Dads
- John H. Froude (born 1930), politician who served in the New Jersey General Assembly from 1972 to 1980
- Monroe Green (c. 1904–1996), businessman and long-time advertising director of The New York Times
- Harold G. Hoffman (1896–1954), mayor, congressman for New Jersey's 3rd congressional district between 1927-1931, and 41st governor of New Jersey between1935-1938, for whom South Amboy Elementary School is named
- Benjamin Franklin Howell (1844–1933), Founder of Amboy Bank, Republican congressman for New Jersey's 3rd congressional district between 1895-1911 , buried in Christ Church Cemetery
- Jack McKeon (born 1930), manager of the 2003 World Series champion Florida Marlins
- Johnny O'Brien (1930-2025) and Eddie O'Brien (1930–2014), twin baseball players for the Pittsburgh Pirates
- Charles Pettit (1736–1806), lawyer, merchant, and delegate to the Congress of the Confederation
- Thomas J. Scully (1864–1921), South Amboy mayor (1910-1911) and Democratic congressman for New Jersey's 3rd congressional district between 1911-1921
- Elmer Stout (1929–2013), football player
- Edward D. Thalmann (1945–2004), expert in diving medicine
- Marques Townes (born 1995), basketball player for the Loyola Ramblers men's basketball team
- Ted Weiss (1927–1992), politician who served in the United States House of Representatives for New York from 1977 until his death in 1992
- Timothy Wiltsey (1985–1991), child murder victim whose mother was convicted 25 years later, a conviction vacated on appeal in 2021 by the New Jersey Supreme Court

== In popular culture ==
Scenes from the 1985 Woody Allen movie The Purple Rose of Cairo were filmed in the former Raritan Diner.

Scenes from the 2000 film Coyote Ugly starring Piper Perabo were filmed in South Amboy and the main character is from the city.

A punishment for the TV show Impractical Jokers was filmed at the Rollermagic Rollerrink, featuring a local roller-derby team.
