= Eddie O'Brien (baseball) =

American baseball player (1930–2014)

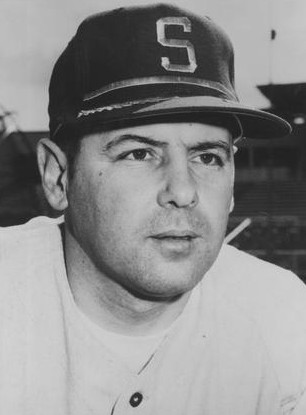
- O'Brien as a coach for the Seattle Pilots in 1969
- Shortstop / Center fielder / Pitcher
- Born: December 11, 1930; South Amboy, New Jersey, U.S.
- Died: February 21, 2014 (aged 83); Seattle, Washington, U.S.
- Batted: Right Threw: Right

MLB debut
- April 25, 1953, for the Pittsburgh Pirates

Last MLB appearance
- April 19, 1958, for the Pittsburgh Pirates

MLB statistics
- Batting average: .236
- Home runs: 0
- Hits: 131
- Runs batted in: 25
- Won-lost record: 1–0
- Earned run average: 3.31
- Innings pitched: 16 1/3
- Stats at Baseball Reference

Teams
- As player: Pittsburgh Pirates (1953, 1955–1958); As coach: Seattle Pilots (1969)

Edward Joseph O'Brien (December 11, 1930 – February 21, 2014) was an American Major League Baseball shortstop, outfielder and pitcher. He played his entire five-year baseball career for the Pittsburgh Pirates (1953, 1955–58). His twin brother, Johnny, was a second baseman and pitcher.

== Early life ==
O'Brien attended Saint Mary's High School in South Amboy, later known as Cardinal McCarrick High School, where he was inducted into the school's sports hall of fame.

O'Brien attended Seattle University, where he played on the basketball team for the Chieftains (along with his brother Johnny) and participated in a stunning 84–81 upset over the Harlem Globetrotters on January 21, 1952. He and Johnny were drafted by the NBA's Milwaukee Hawks in 1953, but they never played in the NBA.

== Baseball career ==
While in Pittsburgh, Johnny and Eddie O'Brien became the first twins in major league history to play for the same team in the same game. They are also one of only four brother combinations to play second base/shortstop on the same major league club. The others are Garvin and Granny Hamner, for the Philadelphia Phillies in 1945; Frank and Milt Bolling, with the Detroit Tigers in 1958, and Billy and Cal Ripken, for the Baltimore Orioles during the 1980s.

== Later life ==
In Jim Bouton's book Ball Four, a memoir of the 1969 baseball season, O'Brien—who in that year had served as bullpen coach for the Seattle Pilots expansion club—was represented as Bouton's consistent antagonist, owing to his refusal to help catch Bouton's knuckleball pitch after the team catchers were reluctant to do so.

Bouton also said the team nicknamed O'Brien “Mr. Small Stuff” because of his attention to minor details.

O’Brien also worked as the Athletic Director at Seattle University and as an energy consultant for the Alaskan shipping industry.

On February 21, 2014, O'Brien died at the age of 83.
