= Don Campbell (American football) =

American football player (1916–1991)

No. 29
- Position: Tackle

Personal information
- Born: November 25, 1916; South Amboy, New Jersey, U.S.
- Died: September 1, 1991 (aged 74); Pittsburgh, Pennsylvania, U.S.
- Listed height: 6 ft 0 in (1.83 m)
- Listed weight: 225 lb (102 kg)

Career information
- High school: South River
- College: Carnegie Mellon

Career history
- Pittsburgh Pirates/Steelers (1939–1940)

Career statistics
- Games started: 12
- Games played: 22
- Stats at Pro Football Reference

Donald Charles Campbell (November 25, 1916 – September 1, 1991) was an American professional football tackle who played with the Pittsburgh Pirates/Steelers of the National Football League (NFL) for two seasons from 1939 to 1940. Campbell played college football at Carnegie Mellon University.
