= Peppadew Fresh Vineyards =

Former farm/winery

Coordinates: 40.366019°N 74.260992°W

- Location: 97 Harbor Road, Morganville, NJ, USA
- Coordinates: 40.366019 N, 74.260992 W
- First vines planted: 2011
- Opened to the public: 2012; Farm winery license deprecated as of 2018
- Key people: Pierre Crawley (owner)
- Area cultivated: 4
- Cases/yr: 900 (estimated, 2016)
- Other products: Azaleas, flowering quinces, hydrangeas, peppadews, pussywillows

Peppadew Fresh Vineyards was a winery in the Morganville section of Marlboro in Monmouth County, New Jersey. Formerly a flower farm, grapes were first planted in 2011, and the winery opened to the public in 2012. As of 2018, Peppadew's farm winery license issued by the Division of Alcoholic Beverage Control of the State of New Jersey no longer appeared on the state's list of licensees.

== Wines and other products ==
Peppadews, the fruit for which the winery was named, were first planted in 2008. In 2012, Peppadew Fresh received a $260,000 grant from the United States Department of Agriculture to expand production and distribution.

It was the only farm in the United States that cultivated peppadews, a pepper cultivar discovered in South Africa in 1996. Peppadew Fresh was not located in one of New Jersey's three viticultural areas.
