= Morganville, New Jersey =

Populated place in Monmouth County, New Jersey, US

- Census-designated place
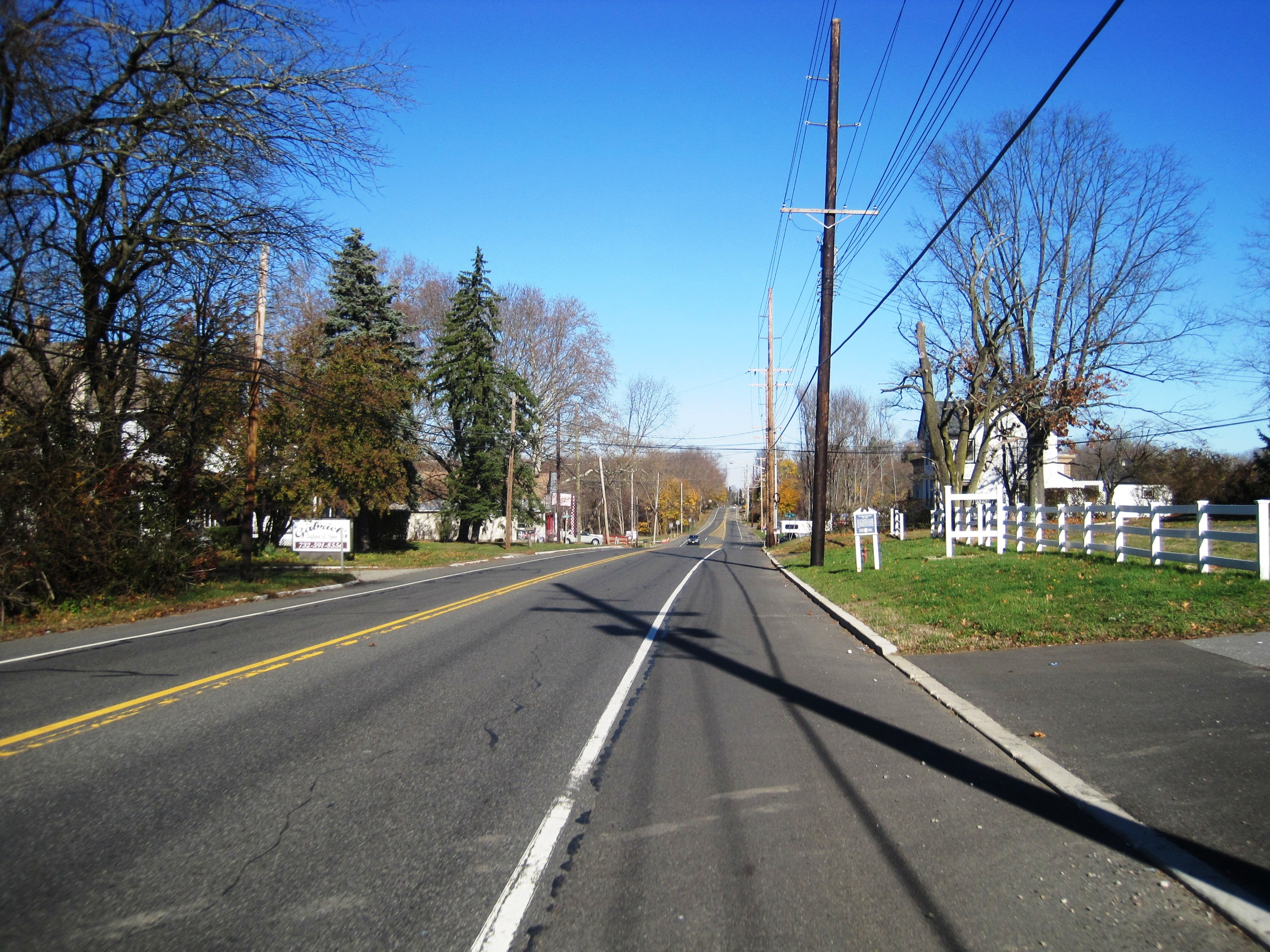
- Along northbound Route 79

- Location of Morganville in Monmouth County highlighted in red (left). Inset map: Location of Monmouth County in New Jersey highlighted in orange (right).

- Location in Monmouth County Location in New Jersey Location in the United States
- Coordinates: 40.375327°N 74.23281°W
- Country: United States
- State: New Jersey
- County: Monmouth
- Township: Marlboro

Area
  - Total: 5.42 sq mi (14.04 km^{2})
  - Land: 5.41 sq mi (14.02 km^{2})
  - Water: 0.0039 sq mi (0.01 km^{2}) 0.11%
- Elevation: 190 ft (58 m)

Population (2020)
  - Total: 6,203
  - Density: 1,145.5/sq mi (442.3/km^{2})
- Time zone: UTC−05:00 (Eastern (EST))
  - Summer (DST): UTC−04:00 (Eastern (EDT))
- ZIP Code: 07751
- Area codes: 732/848
- FIPS code: 34-48030
- GNIS feature ID: 02389505

Morganville is an unincorporated community and census-designated place (CDP) within Marlboro Township, in Monmouth County, New Jersey, United States. As of the 2020 census, the CDP's population was 6,203, up from 5,040 in 2010.

Morganville has its own post office, with a ZIP Code of 07751.

== Geography ==
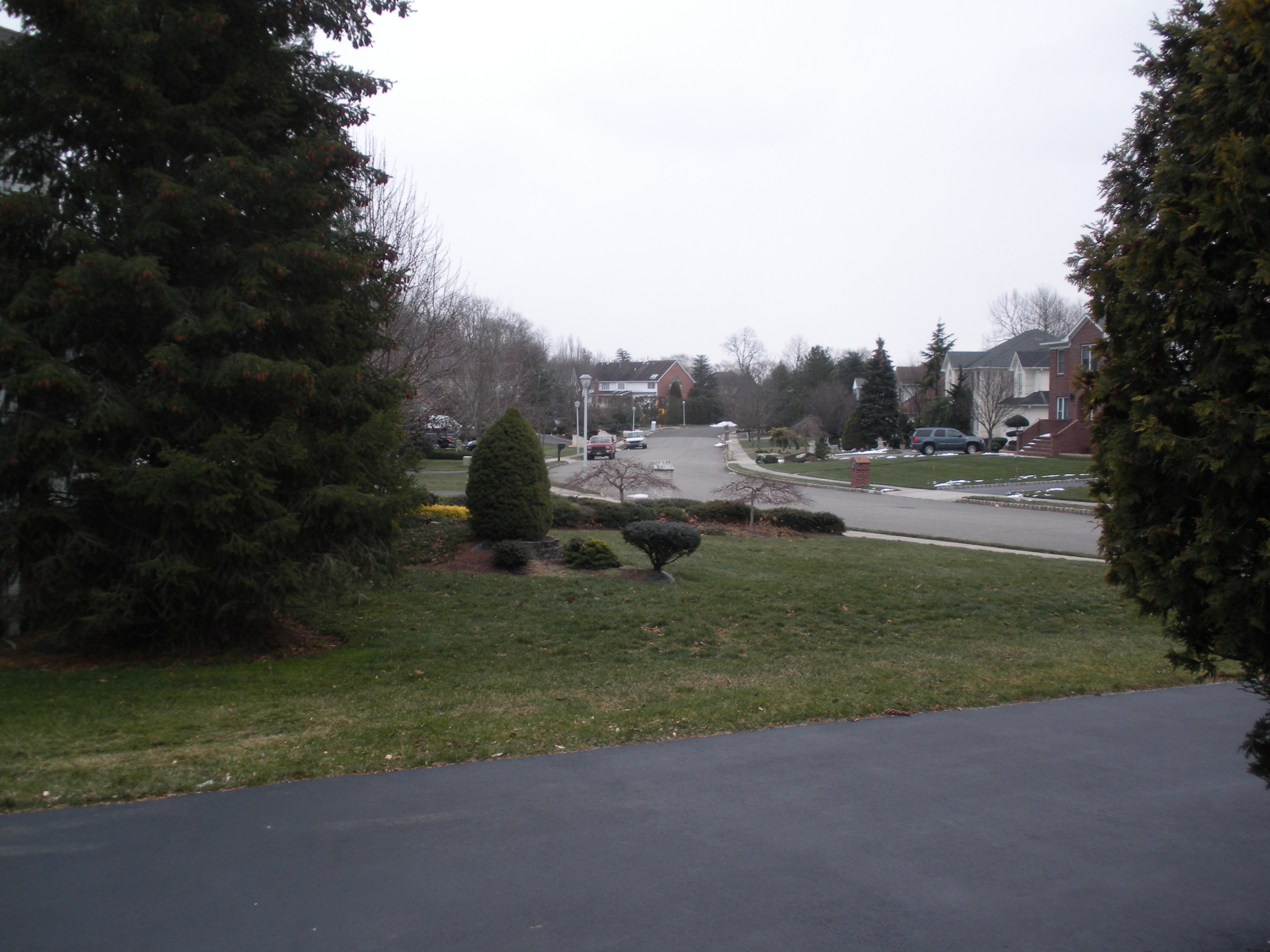
A neighborhood in Morganville

Morganville is in northern Monmouth County, at the northern end of Marlboro Township. It is bordered to the north by the Strathmore section of Aberdeen Township and the borough of Matawan and to the northwest by Old Bridge Township in Middlesex County. New Jersey Route 79 passes through Morganville, leading north 2.5 miles (4.0 km) to Route 34 in Matawan and south 8 miles (13 km) to Freehold Borough, the Monmouth county seat.

According to the United States Census Bureau, Morganville has a total area of 5.42 square miles (14.04 km^{2}), including 0.006 square miles (0.016 km^{2}) of water (0.11%). Mount Pleasant, with an elevation of 364 feet (111 m), is in the southeast part of the community. Land in Morganville drains north via Gravelly Brook toward Matawan Creek, and to the west via Deep Run toward the South River. The entire community is within the watershed of Raritan Bay.

== Demographics ==
Historical population
| Census | Pop. | Note | %± |
|---|---|---|---|
| 2010 | 5,040 | | — |
| 2020 | 6,203 | | 23.1% |
Population sources: 1990-2010 2000; 2010 2020

Morganville first appeared as a census designated place in the 2010 U.S. census. It contains no portion out of the Morganville CDP existent in 2010 (renamed Robertsville in 2010).

=== Racial and ethnic composition ===
Morganville CDP, New Jersey – Racial and ethnic composition Note: the US Census treats Hispanic/Latino as an ethnic category. This table excludes Latinos from the racial categories and assigns them to a separate category. Hispanics/Latinos may be of any race.
| Race / Ethnicity (NH = Non-Hispanic) | Pop 2010 | Pop 2020 | % 2010 | % 2020 |
|---|---|---|---|---|
| White alone (NH) | 3,607 | 3,858 | 71.57% | 62.20% |
| Black or African American alone (NH) | 164 | 163 | 3.25% | 2.63% |
| Native American or Alaska Native alone (NH) | 6 | 7 | 0.12% | 0.11% |
| Asian alone (NH) | 933 | 1,645 | 18.51% | 26.52% |
| Native Hawaiian or Pacific Islander alone (NH) | 0 | 1 | 0.00% | 0.02% |
| Other race alone (NH) | 3 | 15 | 0.06% | 0.24% |
| Mixed race or Multiracial (NH) | 75 | 123 | 1.49% | 1.98% |
| Hispanic or Latino (any race) | 252 | 391 | 5.00% | 6.30% |
| Total | 5,040 | 6,203 | 100.00% | 100.00% |

=== 2020 census ===
As of the 2020 census, Morganville had a population of 6,203. The median age was 43.2 years. 21.8% of residents were under the age of 18 and 14.0% were 65 years of age or older. For every 100 females there were 95.4 males, and for every 100 females age 18 and over there were 95.8 males.

96.9% of residents lived in urban areas, while 3.1% lived in rural areas.

There were 2,166 households, of which 38.8% had children under the age of 18 living in them. Of all households, 68.3% were married-couple households, 10.7% were households with a male householder and no spouse or partner present, and 18.2% were households with a female householder and no spouse or partner present. About 15.3% of all households were made up of individuals, and 6.4% had someone living alone who was 65 years of age or older.

There were 2,270 housing units, of which 4.6% were vacant. The homeowner vacancy rate was 1.0% and the rental vacancy rate was 6.9%.

=== 2010 census ===
The 2010 United States census counted 5,040 people, 1,526 households, and 1,370 families in the CDP. The population density was 929.4 per square mile (358.8/km^{2}). There were 1,583 housing units at an average density of 291.9 per square mile (112.7/km^{2}). The racial makeup was 75.12% (3,786) White, 3.27% (165) Black or African American, 0.14% (7) Native American, 18.53% (934) Asian, 0.00% (0) Pacific Islander, 1.07% (54) from other races, and 1.87% (94) from two or more races. Hispanic or Latino of any race were 5.00% (252) of the population.

Of the 1,526 households, 52.4% had children under the age of 18; 80.9% were married couples living together; 5.6% had a female householder with no husband present and 10.2% were non-families. Of all households, 8.1% were made up of individuals and 4.1% had someone living alone who was 65 years of age or older. The average household size was 3.29 and the average family size was 3.49.

30.7% of the population were under the age of 18, 6.5% from 18 to 24, 21.8% from 25 to 44, 32.6% from 45 to 64, and 8.4% who were 65 years of age or older. The median age was 40.7 years. For every 100 females, the population had 100.9 males. For every 100 females ages 18 and older there were 98.8 males.

=== Income and poverty ===
Based on data from the Census Bureau's 2010-2014 American Community Survey, the median income for a household in the CDP was $119,215, and the median income for a family was $126,213. Males had a median income of $126,208 versus $62,326 for females. The per capita income for the CDP was $50,942. About 0.9% of families and 0.7% of the population were below the poverty line, including 0.8% of those under age 18 and none of those age 65 or over.

== Transportation ==
New Jersey Transit offers bus service to the Port Authority Bus Terminal in Midtown Manhattan on route 139.

== Education ==
As Morganville is located in Marlboro Township, students in public school are served by the Marlboro Township Public School District. Children in Morganville attend Robertsville Elementary School, Frank Defino Elementary School and Asher Holmes Elementary School.

== Wineries ==
- Peppadew Fresh Vineyards

== Notable people ==
People who were born in, residents of, or otherwise closely associated with Morganville include:

- Monica Aksamit (born 1990), saber fencer who won a bronze medal at the 2016 Summer Olympics in the Women's Saber Team competition
- Denis Douglin (born 1988), professional boxer who was the 2008 National Golden Gloves middleweight champion
- Jeff Feuerzeig (born 1964), film screenwriter and director
- Elmer H. Geran (1875–1954), politician who represented New Jersey's 3rd congressional district from 1923 to 1925
- Ellen Karcher (born 1964), member of the New Jersey Senate from 2004 to 2008
- Akash Modi (born 1995), artistic gymnast who represented the United States at the 2018 World Artistic Gymnastics Championships
