= T. Frank Appleby =

United States Congressman from New Jersey (1864–1924)

Theodore Frank Appleby
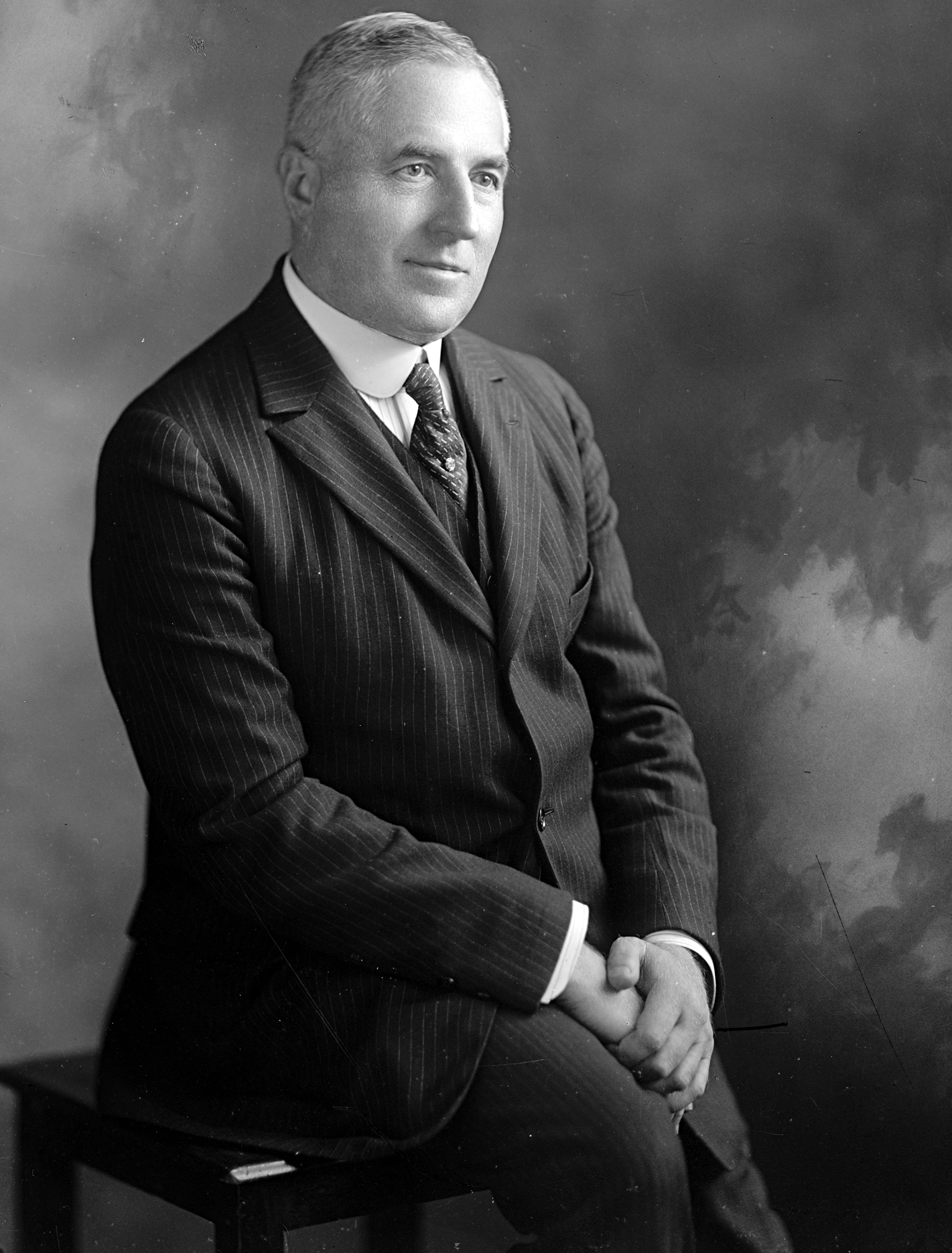

Member of the U.S. House of Representatives from New Jersey's 3rd district
- In office March 4, 1921 – March 4, 1923
- Preceded by: Thomas J. Scully
- Succeeded by: Elmer H. Geran

Personal details
- Born: October 10, 1864 Old Bridge, New Jersey, US
- Died: December 15, 1924 (aged 60) Baltimore, Maryland, US
- Resting place: Chestnut Hill Cemetery
- Party: Republican
- Spouse: Alice C. Hoffman (m. 1889)
- Children: Stewart Hoffman Appleby
- Profession: Real estate and insurance businessman
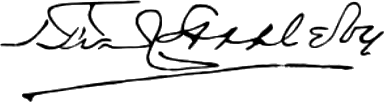
- Signature

Theodore Frank Appleby (October 10, 1864 – December 15, 1924) was an American realtor, insurance agent, banker, and Republican Party politician from Asbury Park, New Jersey who represented Middlesex, Monmouth, and Ocean counties in the United States House of Representatives from 1921 to 1923. He lost re-election in 1922 and won his seat back in 1924 but died before he was sworn into office. He also served as mayor of Asbury Park from 1908 to 1912.

He was the father of Stewart H. Appleby, who took his seat in the next Congress.

== Early life and education ==
Theodore Frank Appleby was born on October 10, 1864, in Old Bridge, New Jersey to Theodore Appleby and Margaret S. (née Mount) Appleby.

After attending Asbury Park public schools and Pennington Seminary, Appleby graduated from Fort Edwards Collegiate Institute in New York in 1885.

== Business career ==
After his graduation, Appleby returned to Asbury Park and entered the real estate business. He was a member of the New Jersey Real Estate Exchange and active in the Asbury Park Building and Loan Association.

He also became involved in the insurance industry, serving for several years as president of the New Jersey Fire Underwriters, and he was a member of the New Jersey Chamber of Commerce. He was also a director of the Asbury Park and Ocean Grove Bank and an attendee at many American Bankers Association conventions.

== Political career ==
Appleby entered politics in 1887 after his election to the local Board of Education. He served for ten years from 1887 to 1897, overlapping briefly with his tenure on the New Jersey Board of Education from 1894 to 1902. He was later appointed by the governor to the board of the New Jersey Geological Survey.

In 1896, Appleby was elected by the New Jersey Republican convention as a district delegate to the 1896 Republican National Convention.

Locally, Appleby was elected as a member of the Asbury Park city council from 1899 to 1906, serving as its president for five terms. He was next elected as mayor of Asbury Park twice and served from 1908 to 1912. He was a member of the Monmouth County Board of Taxation from 1917 to 1920 and served as chair of the Ocean Boulevard Committee.

During the controversy over Prohibition in the state, Governor John Franklin Fort appointed Appleby to a commission investigating excise conditions in the state. The commission produced a report alleging that many local officials did not enforce state liquor laws and that liquor was sold and used even in so-called "dry towns."

=== United States House of Representatives ===
In 1920, he was elected as a Republican to represent New Jersey's 3rd congressional district (consisting of Monmouth County and neighboring Middlesex and Ocean) in the 67th Congress. He lost his re-election campaign in 1922 but was reelected in 1924. During the 1924 election, Appleby was endorsed by the Ku Klux Klan.

Appleby died before he could take his seat for the next Congress and was replaced by his eldest son, Stewart.

== Personal life and death ==
Appleby married Alice C. Hoffman on April 10, 1889 in Somerville, New Jersey. They had three sons:

- Stewart H. Appleby (b. 1890)
- Richard H. Appleby (b. 1891)
- Theodore F. Appleby II (b. 1895)

Appleby was fond of traveling and made an extensive trip to England, France, and Italy. He visited the Panama Canal while it was under construction. He was a member of the Deal Golf Club in Deal, New Jersey.

He died on December 15, 1924, in Baltimore, Maryland. He was buried in Chestnut Hill Cemetery near Old Bridge in East Brunswick, New Jersey.

U.S. House of Representatives
Preceded by Thomas J. Scully	Member of the U.S. House of Representatives from New Jersey's 3rd congressional district 1921–1923	Succeeded by Elmer H. Geran
