= Elmer H. Geran =

American politician (1875-1954)

Elmer Hendrickson Geran
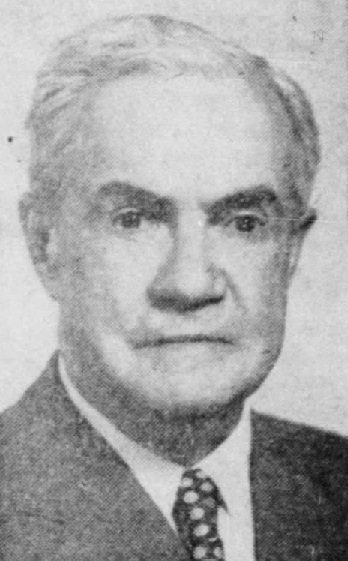
- Asbury Park Press, November 3, 1949

Member of the U.S. House of Representatives from New Jersey's 3rd district
- In office March 4, 1923 – March 3, 1925
- Preceded by: T. Frank Appleby
- Succeeded by: Stewart H. Appleby

Member of the New Jersey General Assembly
- In office 1911–1912
- In office 1916–1917

Sheriff of Monmouth County, New Jersey
- In office 1917–1920
- Preceded by: Cornelius B. Barkalow
- Succeeded by: Walter H. Gravatt

Personal details
- Born: October 24, 1875 Matawan, New Jersey, U.S.
- Died: January 12, 1954 (aged 78) Morganville, New Jersey, U.S.
- Party: Democratic
- Profession: politician

Elmer Hendrickson Geran (October 24, 1875 – January 12, 1954) was an American Democratic Party politician who represented New Jersey's 3rd congressional district from 1923 to 1925.

== Biography ==
=== Education ===
Geran was born in Matawan, New Jersey on October 24, 1875, where he attended the public schools and the Glenwood Military Academy of Matawan, New Jersey. He graduated from Peddie Institute in Hightstown, New Jersey in 1895, from Princeton University in 1899, and from New York Law School in 1901.

=== Career path ===
He was admitted to the New Jersey bar in 1901 and commenced practice in Jersey City, New Jersey. He was Matawan Boro attorney for a number of years. He was known for speeches on the subject of banking. On May 11, 1911 he presented at the Annual Convention for NJ Banking Association in Atlantic City, NJ.

=== Public office ===
He ran for a state senate seat in 1911 but withdrew himself from the race in August 1911 and instead ran for the Assembly. He was a member of the New Jersey General Assembly in 1911 and 1912, and appointed a member of the New Jersey State Water Supply Commission from 1912 to 1915. Geran was assistant prosecutor of the pleas of Monmouth County from 1915 to 1917, and was again a member of the Assembly in 1916 and 1917 and served as minority leader. He served as Sheriff of Monmouth County, New Jersey from 1917 to 1920. One odd event during his tenure as Monmouth County Sheriff was the sale of liquor in 1920. He was ordered by the New Jersey court to sell off the effects of a bar to settle a creditor demands. However, most of the effects of the bar were intoxicating beverages of various types. He was able to obtain federal permission to legally sell the holdings during prohibition.

He was widely considered as a prospective candidate for Governor of New Jersey in 1918 but decided not to run. He was appointed U.S. Attorney for the District of New Jersey by President Woodrow Wilson in 1920. During his tenure he was associated with enforcing the federal law at the time against dissemination of motion pictures of a fight. The fight referenced was the Dempsey-Carpenter fight in Jersey City - July 1921. On December 16, 1921, then Attorney General Dougherty requested Geran's resignation. Stated reason was that the Attorney General desired a Republican hold the office. Geran resigned in 1921 and resumed the practice of law in Asbury Park, New Jersey.

Geran was elected as a Democrat to the Sixty-eighth Congress from March 4, 1923 – March 3, 1925. He was a delegate to the 1924 Democratic National Convention. He also was an unsuccessful candidate for reelection in 1924 to the Sixty-ninth Congress.

=== Later career ===
After leaving Congress, Geran resumed the practice of his profession until September 22, 1927. In 1927, he became Vice President of the New Jersey Gravel & Sand Co. at Farmington. In 1933, he formed the New Jersey Sand and Gravel Producers Association which advocated the use of New Jersey materials in state highway construction. The 1940 Federal Census showed him as manager of a sand and gravel plant and residing on Hodgner Road in Marlboro.

=== Death ===
He died at his home, Glen Geran Farm, in the Morganville section of Marlboro Township, New Jersey on January 12, 1954, and was interred in Old Tennent Cemetery, Manalapan Township, New Jersey.

== The Geran Bill ==
Geran is credited with working under Gov. Woodrow Wilson and drafting a series of election reform laws in 1911 that transformed the way elections were handled in New Jersey. Chiefly viewed as an anti-corruption act for voting, the legislation reform was one of the cornerstones of Gov. Woodrow Wilson's program. Among its many provisions, It is the bill which requires county clerks to mail voters sample ballots before an election.

== Business Interests ==
- Geran was one of 5 principals in the incorporation of The Western Telephone and Telegraph Company in January 1902. WT&T was a holding company within AT&T from 1902 to 1911. In 1911, AT&T absorbed the WT&T in a stock purchase of three shares of AT&T for four shares of WT&T shares plus $20.
- Geran was also one of 5 principals in the incorporation of the Accidental Company under the laws of 1896 on January 23, 1902. This was a telephone company which was set up to carry on business "outside the state of New Jersey".
- Geran was one of 12 principals in the establishment of the Vandalia Coal Company in 1905. Vandalia Coal Company owned and operated mines in the mid-west.
- He joined with three others in the incorporation of Lind & Company in 1909. This was a real estate company which specialized in purchasing land and building mines.
- In 1910 he started the Bankers Organization and Asset Realization Company. The company was a general real estate and investment business.
- He was Director of the Hudson County Water Company. This company primarily appropriated water from New Jersey and sold the water on Staten Island. He resigned his position in this company in 1911 prior to becoming an Assemblyman. He stated it may have been viewed as a conflict of interest.
- In 1931 he was on the Board of Directors for the Matawan Bank when it closed it doors due to exhausting its cash funds.
- In 1932 he was president of the City Mortgage Company which he put into receivership following him uncovering that there was "unscrupulous trading of company stock" by the Board of Directors.
- He was president of the Central Jersey Sand and Gravel Company of Asbury Park when the company went into receivership and became insolvent in 1932.

U.S. House of Representatives
Preceded by T. Frank Appleby	Member of the U.S. House of Representatives from New Jersey's 3rd congressional district March 4, 1923 – March 3, 1925	Succeeded by Stewart H. Appleby
Legal offices
Preceded by Joseph L. Bodine	United States Attorney for the District of New Jersey; 1920–1922	Succeeded by Walter G. Winne
