= South Amboy Public Schools =

School district in Middlesex County, New Jersey, US

Address
- 240 John Street South Amboy, Middlesex County, New Jersey, 08879; United States
- Coordinates: 40.481515°N 74.280429°W

District information
- Grades: PreK-12
- Superintendent: Frederick D. Williams
- Business administrator: Peter Frascella
- Schools: 2

Students and staff
- Enrollment: 1,100 (as of 2020–21)
- Faculty: 81.0 FTEs
- Student–teacher ratio: 13.6:1

Other information
- District Factor Group: CD
- Website: sapublicschools.com
Ind.	Per pupil	District spending	Rank (*)	K-12 average	%± vs. average
1A	Total Spending	$15,928	7	$18,891	−15.7%
1	Budgetary Cost	11,461	4	14,783	−22.5%
2	Classroom Instruction	7,005	7	8,763	−20.1%
6	Support Services	1,421	3	2,392	−40.6%
8	Administrative Cost	1,510	14	1,485	1.7%
10	Operations & Maintenance	1,200	5	1,783	−32.7%
13	Extracurricular Activities	262	3	268	−2.2%
16	Median Teacher Salary	63,282	31	64,043
Data from NJDoE 2014 Taxpayers' Guide to Education Spending. *Of K-12 districts with up to 1,800 students. Lowest spending=1; Highest=49

The South Amboy Public Schools are a comprehensive community public school district that serve students in pre-kindergarten through twelfth grade from South Amboy, in Middlesex County, in the U.S. state of New Jersey.

As of the 2020–21 school year, the district, comprising two schools, had an enrollment of 1,100 students and 81.0 classroom teachers (on an FTE basis), for a student–teacher ratio of 13.6:1.

The district is classified by the New Jersey Department of Education as being in District Factor Group "CD", the sixth-highest of eight groupings. District Factor Groups organize districts statewide to allow comparison by common socioeconomic characteristics of the local districts. From lowest socioeconomic status to highest, the categories are A, B, CD, DE, FG, GH, I and J.

== Awards and recognition ==
The NAMM Foundation named the district in its 2008 survey of the "Best Communities for Music Education", which included 110 school districts nationwide.

== Schools ==
Schools in the district (with 2020–21 enrollment data from the National Center for Education Statistics) are:

- South Amboy Elementary School with 514 students in grades PreK-5
- South Amboy Middle High School with 559 students in grades 6-12

== Administration ==
Core members of the district's administration are:

- Frederick D. Williams, superintendent
- Peter Frascella, business administrator and board secretary

== Board of education ==
The district's board of education, composed of nine members, sets policy and oversees the fiscal and educational operation of the district through its administration. As a Type II school district, the board's trustees are elected directly by voters to serve three-year terms of office on a staggered basis, with three seats up for election each year held (since 2014) as part of the November general election. The board appoints a superintendent to oversee the district's day-to-day operations and a business administrator to supervise the business functions of the district.
