= Jacob Augustus Geissenhainer =

American politician (1839-1917)

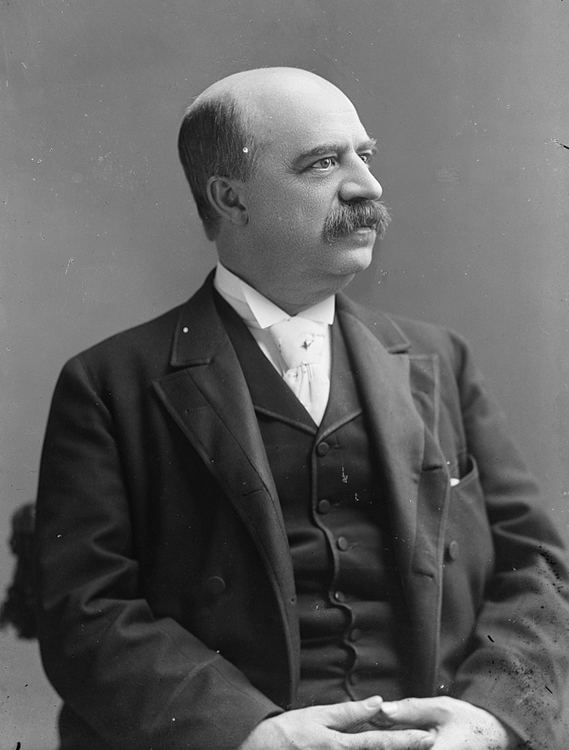
- From Library of Congress

Member of the U.S. House of Representatives from New Jersey's 3rd district
- In office March 4, 1889 – March 3, 1895
- Preceded by: John Kean
- Succeeded by: Benjamin Franklin Howell

Personal details
- Born: August 28, 1839 New York City, New York, U.S.
- Died: July 20, 1917 (aged 77) Mount Pocono, Pennsylvania, U.S.
- Resting place: West Laurel Hill Cemetery, Bala Cynwyd, Pennsylvania, U.S.
- Party: Democratic
- Profession: Politician

Jacob Augustus Geissenhainer (August 28, 1839 – July 20, 1917) was an American politician who served as a Democratic member of the United States House of Representatives for New Jersey's 3rd congressional district from 1889 to 1895.

== Early life and education ==
Geissenhainer was born August 28, 1839, in New York City and attended private schools. He received an A.B. degree in 1858 and a LL.B. degree in 1860 from Columbia College. He attended Yale Law School and received a law degree from New York University in 1860. He also attended the University of Berlin. In 1862 he was admitted to the bar, and he commenced practice in New York City.

== Career ==
He lived in Freehold Township, New Jersey, and was elected as a Democrat to the Fifty-first, Fifty-second and Fifty-third Congresses where he served from March 4, 1889 until March 3, 1895.

He also served as chairman of the Committee on Immigration and Naturalization (Fifty-third Congress), and on the Committee on Naval Affairs (Fifty-third Congress). Geissenhainer was an unsuccessful candidate for reelection in 1894 to the Fifty-fourth Congress. After serving in Congress, he resumed the practice of law.

He died July 20, 1917, at Mount Pocono, Pennsylvania, and was interred in West Laurel Hill Cemetery, Bala Cynwyd, Pennsylvania.

== Personal life ==
He married Susan H. Burkhalter and together they had a son and daughter.

U.S. House of Representatives
Preceded by John Kean	Member of the U.S. House of Representatives from New Jersey's 3rd congressional district March 4, 1889-March 3, 1895	Succeeded by Benjamin F. Howell
