= Thomas J. Scully =

American politician

Thomas Joseph Scully
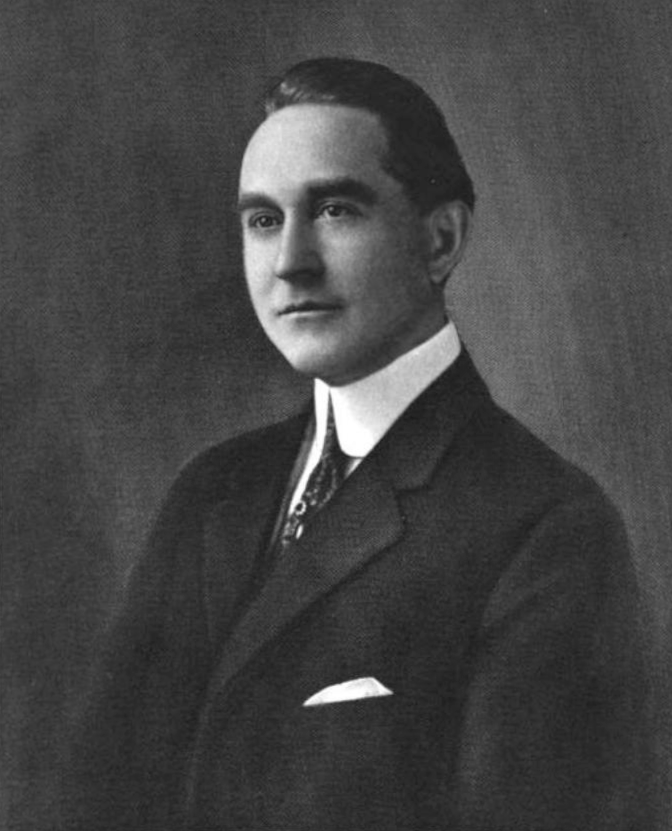

Member of the U.S. House of Representatives from New Jersey's 3rd district
- In office March 4, 1911 – March 4, 1921
- Preceded by: Benjamin F. Howell
- Succeeded by: T. Frank Appleby

Personal details
- Born: September 19, 1868 South Amboy, New Jersey, U.S.
- Died: December 14, 1921 (aged 53) South Amboy, New Jersey, U.S.
- Party: Democratic
- Profession: Towing and transportation

Thomas Joseph Scully (September 19, 1868 – December 14, 1921) was an American Democratic Party politician who represented New Jersey's 3rd congressional district for five terms from 1911 to 1921.

== Biography ==
Scully was born in South Amboy, New Jersey, on September 19, 1868. He attended the public schools, and Seton Hall College in South Orange, New Jersey. He engaged in the marine towing and transportation business. Scully was a member of the board of education from 1893 to 1895 and served as the Mayor of South Amboy, New Jersey in 1909 and 1910. He was elected as a Democrat to the 62nd United States Congress and to the four succeeding Congresses, serving in office from March 4, 1911 to March 4, 1921.

He was a delegate to the 1912 Democratic National Convention. After he left Congress, he served again mayor of South Amboy, from 1921 until his death in that city on December 14, 1921. He was interred in St. Mary's Cemetery, South Amboy, New Jersey.

U.S. House of Representatives
Preceded by Benjamin F. Howell	Member of the U.S. House of Representatives from New Jersey's 3rd congressional district March 4, 1911 – March 4, 1921	Succeeded by T. Frank Appleby
