= Frank Bolling =

American baseball player (1931–2020)

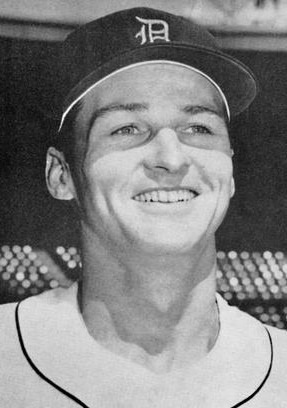
- Bolling, circa 1959
- Second baseman
- Born: November 16, 1931; Mobile, Alabama, U.S.
- Died: July 11, 2020 (aged 88); Mobile, Alabama, U.S.
- Batted: Right Threw: Right

MLB debut
- April 13, 1954, for the Detroit Tigers

Last MLB appearance
- September 15, 1966, for the Atlanta Braves

MLB statistics
- Batting average: .254
- Home runs: 106
- Runs batted in: 556
- Stats at Baseball Reference

Teams
- Detroit Tigers (1954–1960); Milwaukee / Atlanta Braves (1961–1966)

Career highlights and awards
- 4× All-Star (1961–1962²); Gold Glove Award (1958)

Francis Elmore Bolling (November 16, 1931 – July 11, 2020) was an American baseball second baseman who played twelve seasons in Major League Baseball (MLB). He played for the Detroit Tigers and Milwaukee/Atlanta Braves from 1954 until 1966. He batted and threw right-handed, and was the younger brother of shortstop Milt Bolling.

Bolling was signed as an amateur free agent by the Detroit Tigers in 1951 and played for four of their minor league affiliates until 1954, when the Tigers promoted him to the major leagues. After completing military service in 1955, he went on to spend five more seasons with the organization. He was subsequently dealt to the Milwaukee Braves. The team moved to Atlanta in 1966, the final season of his career, and he played his last game on September 15 that year.

== Early life ==
Bolling was born in Mobile, Alabama, on November 16, 1931. He attended McGill–Toolen Catholic High School, and went on to study at Spring Hill College. He was signed as an amateur free agent by the Detroit Tigers in June 1951.

== Career ==
Bolling reached the majors in 1954 with the Detroit Tigers, playing six seasons with them before moving to the Milwaukee Braves in 1961. He was on the Braves' roster when the team moved to Atlanta in 1966.

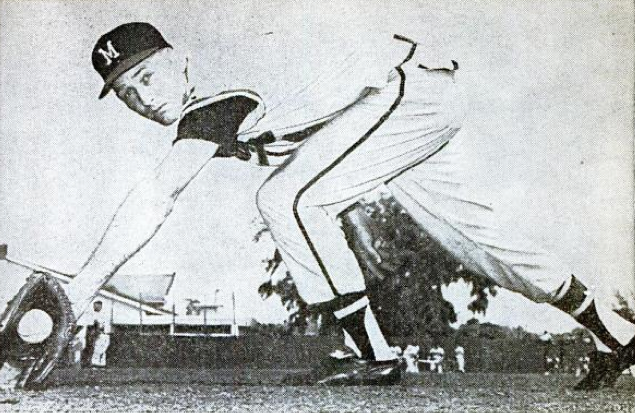
Milwaukee Braves second baseman Frank Bolling in a 1961 issue of Baseball Digest

A fine defensive second baseman, Bolling also averaged 14 home runs from 1957 to 1959, with a career-high 15 in 1957. His most productive season was 1958, when he posted career high numbers in hits (164), doubles (27), runs and RBIs (75), and won the Gold Glove Award after leading the American League second basemen in fielding percentage. When his brother Milt was traded to Detroit during the same season, the Bollings became one of only four brother combinations in major league history to play the keystone combination (second base and shortstop) on the same club. The others are Garvin and Granny Hamner (for the Philadelphia Phillies in 1945), the twins Eddie and Johnny O'Brien with the Pittsburgh Pirates in the mid-1950s, and Cal and Billy Ripken for the Baltimore Orioles during the 1980s.

Traded to the Braves for Bill Bruton after the 1960 season, Bolling led National League second basemen in fielding in 1961, 1962 and 1964. He made the National League All-Star team in 1961 and 1962, and also was named on The Sporting News NL All-Star Team in 1961. During his penultimate season in 1965, Bolling hit the only grand slam of his career off Sandy Koufax on September 22. It was also the last game the Braves played in Milwaukee before moving to Atlanta. Bolling played his final major league game on September 15, 1966, two months shy of his 35th birthday. He was subsequently released by the Braves in October of that year. Bolling finished his career with a .254 batting average, 106 home runs, and 556 runs batted in (RBI) in 1,540 games played. He never played an inning at any position other than second base, ending with a career fielding mark of .982.

== Post-playing career ==
The road that Hank Aaron Stadium is on, Bolling Brothers Boulevard, is named in tribute to Bolling and his brother Milt. He was inducted into the Milwaukee Braves' Wall of Honor at Miller Park in May 2019.

Bolling died on July 11, 2020, at the age of 88. He had been suffering from cancer in the four years leading up to his death.
