= Marques Townes =

Dominican-American basketball player (born 1995)

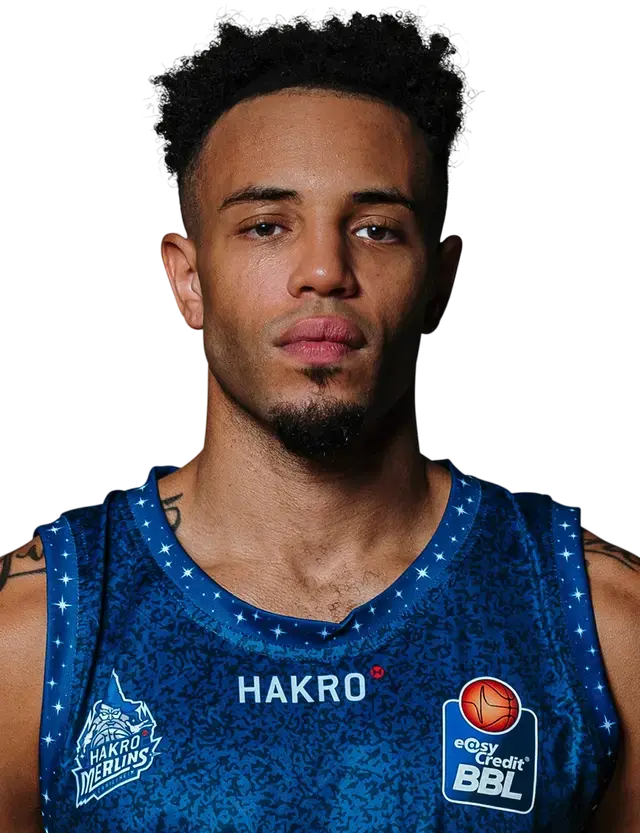
- Townes in 2023

No. 3 – Gran Canaria
- Position: Point guard / Shooting guard
- League: Primera FEB

Personal information
- Born: September 3, 1995 (age 31) New Brunswick, New Jersey, U.S.
- Listed height: 6 ft 4 in (1.93 m)
- Listed weight: 88 kg (194 lb)

Career information
- High school: Cardinal McCarrick (South Amboy, New Jersey); St. Joseph (Metuchen, New Jersey)
- College: Fairleigh Dickinson (2014–2016); Loyola Chicago (2017–2019)
- NBA draft: 2019: undrafted
- Playing career: 2019–present

Career history
- 2019–2021: Murcia
- 2021: BC Kalev
- 2021–2022: Pieno žvaigždės Pasvalys
- 2022: Tours Métropole Basket
- 2022–2023: Kecskeméti TE
- 2023: Crailsheim Merlins
- 2023–2024: Opava
- 2024: PAOK Thessaloniki
- 2025: Peja
- 2025–2026: Oviedo
- 2026–present: Gran Canaria

Career highlights
- MVC Player of the Year (2019); First-team All-MVC (2019)

Marques Rashaad Townes Villar (born September 3, 1995) is a Dominican-American basketball player for Gran Canaria of the Spanish Primera FEB. He played college basketball for the Loyola Ramblers, after beginning his career with Fairleigh Dickinson.

He drew national attention after helping the Ramblers reach the Final Four round of the 2018 NCAA tournament. Entering the college level, the 6-foot-4, 210-pound guard was a three-star basketball recruit. A native of Edison, New Jersey, he attended Cardinal McCarrick High School and St. Joseph High School, where he played both basketball and american football.

== Early life ==
Townes was born in Edison, New Jersey to Bryant and Luisa Townes but grew up in the nearby city of Rahway. While in fifth grade, he moved to South Amboy, New Jersey. Townes began his high school years at Cardinal McCarrick High School in South Amboy, where he played basketball under head coach Joe Lewis. As a sophomore, he averaged 19.2 points and 7.5 rebounds per game, earning first-team All-County honors from The Star-Ledger and leading the team to a 22–7 record. At the time, he was being recruited by several major college programs, including Miami, Rutgers, and Virginia.

Before his junior season, Townes announced that he would transfer to St. Joseph High School in Metuchen, New Jersey, in pursuit of "bigger and better opportunities." He joined a lineup that featured future National Basketball Association (NBA) players Karl-Anthony Towns and Wade Baldwin IV. As a senior, he averaged about 17 points, five rebounds, three assists, and two steals per game, being a third-team All-State pick by The Star-Ledger. His team, which was ranked the 12th best in the nation by USA Today, finished with a 30–2 record and won the state's Tournament of Champions for the first time in program history. He accumulated 1,863 points, the most in school history behind Jay Williams.

Townes also saw success on the football field at St. Joseph, where he played the outside linebacker position. He drew interest from various college football programs, such as Penn State, Maryland, and Rutgers, but eventually chose to focus on basketball.

== College career ==
A three-star recruit, Townes decided to start his college basketball career with the Fairleigh Dickinson Knights, turning down offers from Saint Peter's, South Alabama, Hartford, and Charleston Southern. In his freshman season for the Knights, he averaged 9.1 points, 3.3 rebounds, 1.3 assists, and 1.6 steals per game. On December 29, 2015, against Towson, he recorded 18 points, six rebounds, and five steals, all season-bests. As a sophomore at Fairleigh Dickinson, Townes started in all 33 games, averaging 11.5 points, 3.9 rebounds, 2.7 assists, and 1.3 steals per game. He led the team to the 2016 NCAA Division I men's basketball tournament, where they lost to Florida Gulf Coast in the First Four round.

After his second season in college, Townes announced that he transfer to play for the Loyola Ramblers. He sat out in the 2016–17 season due to National Collegiate Athletic Association (NCAA) transfer rules. On November 24, 2017, he scored a season-high 23 points to help beat UNC Wilmington. At the 2018 NCAA tournament, Townes helped Loyola, an 11-seed, make a Cinderella run to the Final Four. In the team's Sweet 16 match-up with Nevada, he made the game-clinching three-pointer with 6.3 seconds left in regulation. With his success in the tournament, he garnered national attention, being featured in the New York Post and Chicago Tribune.

Coming into his senior season, Townes was named to the Preseason Second Team All-MVC. He was named MVC Player of the Year. Townes averaged 15.3 points, 5.0 rebounds, 3.6 assists and 1.1 steals per game as Loyola won 20 games and earned a spot in the National Invitation Tournament.

== Professional career ==
On July 23, 2019, Townes signed with UCAM Murcia of the Liga ACB. He averaged 6 points per game during his rookie season. On June 10, 2020, Townes extended his contract by one season.

On March 11, 2021, he signed with Kalev/Cramo of the VTB United League.

On September 16, 2021, he signed with Pieno žvaigždės Pasvalys of the Lithuanian Basketball League. Townes averaged 11.4 points, 3.1 rebounds, 3.0 assists and 1.1 steals per game. On January 3, 2022, he signed with Tours Métropole Basket of the LNB Pro B.

On November 22, 2023, he signed with BK Opava of NBL due to the injury of Opava captain Jakub Šiřina. On January 22, 2024, he joined PAOK Thessaloniki of the Greek Basket League.

On October 12, 2025, he signed for Oviedo CB of the Spanish Primera FEB. On July 10, 2026, he signed for Gran Canaria of the Primera FEB.

== National team career ==
In July 2018, Townes was selected to represent the Dominican Republic at the Central American and Caribbean Games.
