= Monroe Green =

- Born: c. 1904; South Amboy, New Jersey
- Died: December 7, 1996 (age 92); Palm Beach, Florida
- Education: B.A. University of Pennsylvania
- Occupation: Businessman
- Known for: Advertising director of The New York Times
- Spouse(s): Ruth Gast (died 1979); Jean Green
- Children: 2

Monroe Green (c. 1904 – December 7, 1996) was an American businessman and long-time advertising director of The New York Times.

== Biography ==
Green was born in South Amboy, New Jersey, to a Jewish family, the only child of an owner of a small clothing store. His father died when Green was 10. In 1927, Green graduated from the University of Pennsylvania and after school, went to work as a store advertising manager for Macy's. In 1930, he accepted a position with The New York American becoming advertising director of New York Journal-American in 1936 after its merger with New York Evening Journal.

In 1942, he joined The New York Times as advertising director where he doubled the newspaper's advertising revenues, expanded internationally, and propelled The Times Magazine to the top position in fashion advertising. Under his tenure, he grew advertising revenues to be three times the revenues from the sale of newspapers. In 1968, Green retired.

== Personal life ==
Green was married twice. His first wife, Ruth Gast, died in 1979. He was survived by his wife, Jean Green; and two children: George Green and Nancy Green Sherman Friedman. Green died at his home on December 7, 1996, in Palm Beach, Florida.
