= Stewart H. Appleby =

American politician

Stewart Appleby
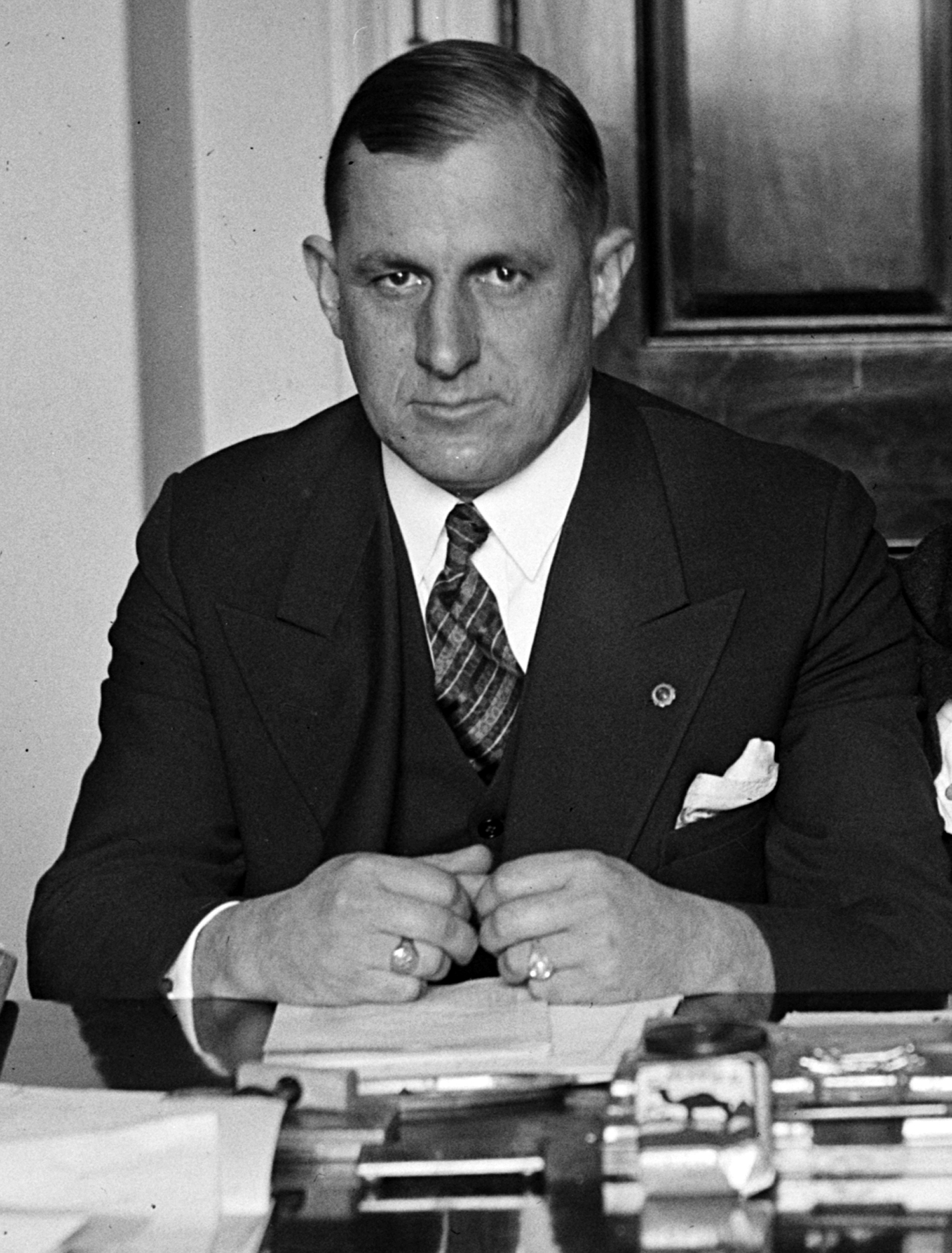

Member of the U.S. House of Representatives from New Jersey's 3rd district
- In office November 3, 1925 – March 3, 1927
- Preceded by: Elmer H. Geran
- Succeeded by: Harold G. Hoffman

Personal details
- Born: Stewart Hoffman Appleby; May 17, 1890 Asbury Park, New Jersey, US
- Died: January 12, 1964 (aged 73) Miami, Florida, US
- Resting place: Arlington National Cemetery
- Party: Republican
- Profession: politician

Stewart Hoffman Appleby (May 17, 1890 – January 12, 1964) was an American businessman, military officer, and politician who served one term as a Republican Party politician who represented New Jersey's 3rd congressional district from 1925–1927, filling the vacancy of his father T. Frank Appleby, who had been elected to office but died before taking the seat.

== Early life and career ==
Born in Asbury Park, New Jersey, Appleby attended the public schools of Asbury Park, and Mercersburg Academy. He graduated from Rutgers University, New Brunswick, New Jersey, in 1913 and afterward engaged in the real estate and insurance business.

Appleby organized and served as vice president of the First National Bank of Avon-by-the-Sea, New Jersey. During the First World War, he enlisted in the United States Marine Corps on May 17, 1917, and served until May 17, 1921. He was commissioned a captain in the United States Marine Corps Reserve on November 24, 1925.

== Congress ==
Appleby was elected as a Republican to the Sixty-ninth Congress to fill the vacancy caused by the death of his father, Representative-elect T. Frank Appleby, and served from November 3, 1925, to March 3, 1927, but was not a candidate for renomination in 1926.

== World War II and retirement ==
During World War II, Appleby served in the United States Coast Guard, being discharged in September 1945 as a coxswain.

He retired to Hallandale, Florida, and died in Miami, Florida, January 12, 1964. He was interred in Arlington National Cemetery, Fort Myer, Virginia.

U.S. House of Representatives
Preceded by Elmer H. Geran	Member of the U.S. House of Representatives from New Jersey's 3rd congressional district November 3, 1925 – March 3, 1927	Succeeded by Harold G. Hoffman
