= South Amboy Middle High School =

High school in Middlesex County, New Jersey, US

Location
- 200 Governor Harold G. Hoffman Plaza; South Amboy, Middlesex County, New Jersey 08879; United States
- Coordinates: 40.481437°N 74.274203°W

Information
- Type: Public high school
- School district: South Amboy Public Schools
- NCES School ID: 341512000154
- Principal: Erin Lamberson
- Faculty: 40.9 FTEs
- Grades: 6-12
- Enrollment: 594 (as of 2023–24)
- Student to teacher ratio: 14.5:1
- Colors: Purple and gold
- Athletics conference: Greater Middlesex Conference
- Team name: Governors or Guvs
- Website: mhs.sapublicschools.com

South Amboy Middle / High School (also known as H. G. Hoffman High School) is a seven-year comprehensive community public high school that serves students in sixth through twelfth grades from South Amboy in Middlesex County, in the U.S. state of New Jersey, operating as the lone secondary school of the South Amboy Public Schools.

As of the 2023–24 school year, the school had an enrollment of 594 students and 40.9 classroom teachers (on an FTE basis), for a student–teacher ratio of 14.5:1. There were 236 students (39.7% of enrollment) eligible for free lunch and 61 (10.3% of students) eligible for reduced-cost lunch.

== Awards, recognition and rankings ==
The school was the 245th-ranked public high school in New Jersey out of 339 schools statewide in New Jersey Monthly magazine's September 2014 cover story on the state's "Top Public High Schools", using a new ranking methodology. The school had been ranked 172nd in the state of 328 schools in 2012, after being ranked 165th in 2010 out of 322 schools listed. The magazine ranked the school 209th in 2008 out of 316 schools. The school was ranked 198th in the magazine's September 2006 issue, which surveyed 316 schools across the state. Schooldigger.com ranked the school 205th out of 376 public high schools statewide in its 2010 rankings (an increase of 3 positions from the 2009 rank) which were based on the combined percentage of students classified as proficient or above proficient on the language arts literacy and mathematics components of the High School Proficiency Assessment (HSPA).

== Athletics ==
The South Amboy Middle High School Governors (or Guvs) compete in the Greater Middlesex Conference, which is comprised of public and private high schools located in the greater Middlesex County area, and operates under the supervision of the New Jersey State Interscholastic Athletic Association (NJSIAA). With 210 students in grades 10–12, the school was classified by the NJSIAA for the 2019–20 school year as Group I for most athletic competition purposes, which included schools with an enrollment of 75 to 476 students in that grade range.

The school participates in joint cooperative field hockey and football teams with Sayreville War Memorial High School as the host school / lead agency. These co-op programs operate under agreements scheduled to expire at the end of the 2023–24 school year.

The boys' basketball team won the Group II state championship in 1939 (defeating Wildwood High School in the tournament final) and won the Group I title in 1963 (vs. Wood-Ridge High School). The 1939 came back in the fourth quarter to defeat Wildwood for the Group II title and was presented the championship trophy by former Governor Harold Hoffman, the school's namesake. In 1963, the team defeated Wood-Ridge 63–60 in overtime to win the Group I state championship game in front of a crowd of 5,000 at Convention Hall in Atlantic City.

The 1984 baseball team won the Group I state title with a 3–0 victory against Emerson Junior-Senior High School in the championship game, to finish the season 19–3.

The girls' basketball team won the Group I state championship in five consecutive seasons, in 1985 (defeating New Providence High School in the tournament final), 1986 and 1987 (vs. Waldwick High School both years), 1988 (vs. Roselle Park High School) and 1989 (vs. University High School); the five state titles are tied for tenth-most in the state and the five consecutive titles are the second-longest streak in the state. The team won their second consecutive Group I title in 1987 with a 73–29 win in the championship game against Waldwick. Despite being one of the smallest high schools in New Jersey, the 1989 team set a state record with their fifth consecutive group title, before being awarded the sixth and lowest seed in the Tournament of Champions, where they defeated third-seeded Bishop Eustace Preparatory School 74–61 in the first round and then second-seed Pascack Valley High School by a score of 45–43 in the semifinals before a 45–43 overtime win against fourth-seeded Union Catholic Regional High School in the finals. For their accomplishments, the team was inducted into the NJSIAA Hall of Fame in 2015.

The 1986 softball team finished the season with a record of 19-0-1 after winning the Group I state championship in with a 10-2 one-hitter against Pompton Lakes High School in their first and only playoff final to date.

== Administration ==
The school's principal is Erin Lamberson. Her administration team includes the vice principal.

== Notable alumni ==
- Craig Coughlin (born 1958), politician who has represented the 19th Legislative District in the New Jersey General Assembly since 2010 and has served as the Speaker of the General Assembly since 2018
- Harold G. Hoffman (1896-1954, class of 1913), 41st Governor of New Jersey, from 1935 to 1938
- Ted Weiss (1927–1992, class of 1946), politician who served in the United States House of Representatives for New York from 1977 until his death in 1992.
