= Amboy Bank =

American bank

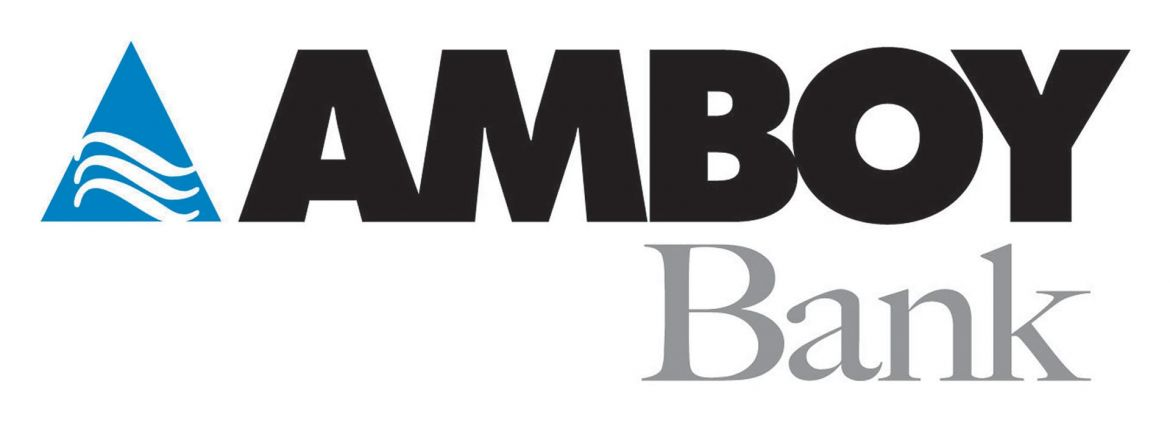
- Type: Private company
- Industry: Banking
- Founded: 1888; 138 years ago
- Headquarters: Old Bridge, New Jersey, U.S.
- Area served: New Jersey (some products available nationwide)
- Products: Deposits, mortgages, home equity loans, commercial loans
- Total assets: $2.31 billion (Q4 2018)
- Parent: Amboy Bancorp
- Subsidiaries: Amboy Direct
- Website: www.amboybank.com

Amboy Bank is an American bank headquartered in Old Bridge, New Jersey. Amboy Bank has locations in Middlesex and Monmouth Counties in central New Jersey, and serves consumer and commercial customers. Its deposits are insured to the legal maximum by the Federal Deposit Insurance Corporation (FDIC).

== History ==
Amboy Bank was chartered on May 12, 1888 as The First National Bank of South Amboy by a group of prominent local businessmen. In the late 1950s the bank began to open branches in the area, and in 1960 the name was changed to First National Bank of South Amboy-Madison Township to reflect the move of its headquarters to nearby Madison Township (later renamed Old Bridge Township). In 1963 the name was changed to Amboy-Madison National Bank, and was shortened to Amboy National Bank in 1991. The bank is now known as Amboy Bank, a name change that occurred in 2008 after the bank converted to a state charter.

Amboy Bank has been privately owned since its inception, and has been held by Amboy Bancorporation since 1984.

In the mid-1980s, Amboy Bank became one of the first lenders in the United States to offer a biweekly mortgage. Amboy Direct was established in 1995 to provide products to those outside of Amboy Bank’s traditional footprint. In 2003 it transitioned to offering accounts that could be opened online.

Amboy Bank has been voted by readers of the Home News Tribune as the Best Bank in Middlesex County for 27 years in a row.

== Community involvement ==
In 1998, the Amboy Foundation was established to provide grants to community organizations that support education, civic, health, and social services.

== Locations ==
Excluding its corporate headquarters, as of 2024, Amboy Bank operated 12 locations in Middlesex County and 10 in Monmouth County.
