= Milt Bolling =

American baseball player (1930–2013)

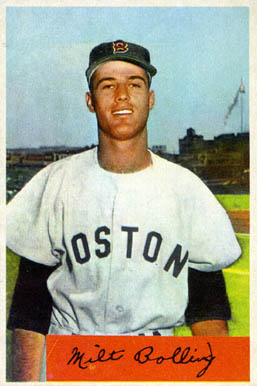
- Infielder
- Born: August 9, 1930; Mississippi City, Mississippi, U.S.
- Died: January 19, 2013 (aged 82); Mobile, Alabama, U.S.
- Batted: Right Threw: Right

MLB debut
- September 10, 1952, for the Boston Red Sox

Last MLB appearance
- July 28, 1958, for the Detroit Tigers

MLB statistics
- Batting average: .241
- Home runs: 19
- Runs batted in: 94
- Stats at Baseball Reference

Teams
- Boston Red Sox (1952–1957); Washington Senators (1957); Detroit Tigers (1958)

Milton Joseph Bolling (August 9, 1930 – January 19, 2013) was an American shortstop in Major League Baseball who played from 1952 through 1958 for the Boston Red Sox (1952–1957), Washington Senators (1957) and Detroit Tigers (1958). Bolling batted and threw right-handed. He was the older brother of Frank Bolling.

In a seven-season career, Bolling was a .241 hitter with 19 home runs and 94 runs batted in (RBIs) in 400 games played.

== Early career ==
At the age of 17, Bolling was signed by the Boston Red Sox as an amateur free agent. He began his professional career in Minor League Baseball for the Class B Piedmont League Roanoke Red Sox. As a shortstop, he was not brought in for his bat, but as a defensive specialist. In the 1948 season, Bolling had 54 hits in 293 at bats to compile a .184 batting average in 85 games. 1949 saw Bolling as Roanoke's starting shortstop for the majority of the season. He had 12 home runs and 28 doubles to go with a .230 batting average in 139 games. His quality play earned him a spot at shortstop on the Piedmont League All-Star Team.

In 1950 Bolling was advanced to the Class A Scranton Miners of the Eastern League. Along with his fielding prowess, his batting was starting to get hot as well, batting .276 for the season with 134 hits in 486 at bats. For a short period, Bolling was promoted to the AA Birmingham Barons. He failed to make a good impression, going just 2 for 27 in 10 games to compile a .074 average. 1951 was familiar territory for Bolling as he began his second season with the Scranton Red Sox. He only played in 71 games, but still managed to hit a modest .253 with 56 hits and 16 doubles. 1952 would prove to be a big year for Bolling. He was promoted once again to the Birmingham Barons, but this time he held his own by hitting a clean .250 with 83 hits in 94 games.

== Boston Red Sox ==
In September 1952, the struggling Boston Red Sox brought up 11 minor leaguers all at once, including Bolling. On September 10, Bolling made his Major League debut by replacing Johnny Lipon at shortstop for Boston. Bolling walked in his first at bat in the seventh inning against Bill Wight of the Detroit Tigers. In the top of the ninth, Bolling slugged his first major league hit. The Red Sox would go on to lose the game 6 to 2. For the rest of September, Bolling put up typical numbers for a shortstop of the era. He hit .222 with a lone home run on September 16 and three runs batted in for only 36 at bats.

1953 was the first full Major League season for Bolling. He competed with veteran Lipon for the starting role at shortstop which was eventually won by Bolling when the Red Sox sold Lipon to the St Louis Browns on September 8. On April 16, opening day for the Red Sox against the Philadelphia Athletics, Milt started at shortstop and got off to a red-hot start, going 4 for 5 with a double and one run batted in en route to an 11–6 victory. Milt finished April with a strong .293 average, but struggled in May and June with monthly batting averages of .215 and .229. In July, Bolling's bat got white hot as he hit .380 in 71 at bats. He eventually tapered off but put up a respectable .263 batting average with five home runs and 28 RBIs in 109 games as the Sox shortstop. He was sixth in the American League for sacrifice hits with 13.

1954 was more of the same for Bolling, except this time he led the American League in errors committed with 33. However, he was fourth with assists at shortstop, and first with his range factor. Milt put down 13 more sacrifice hits, good enough for fourth in the league. Bolling was third in doubles among all AL shortstops with 20. His hitting got off to a slow start and he never truly recovered, batting just .249 with six home runs and 36 RBIs.

On March 23, 1955, Milt had a career-threatening injury when he broke his left elbow in a Spring training game against the St. Louis Cardinals after he had already won the starting role at shortstop for the season. He was expected to return after six weeks, but ended up playing in only six games for the entire season.

By the time Bolling got a clean bill of health, he had lost his starting job to Don Buddin for the 1956 season. Milt was a rarely used pinch hitter until he started seeing some starts at the tail end of the season in August and September. He could only muster a .212 batting average to go with 3 home runs and 8 RBI in just 45 games.

== Washington Senators ==
After playing just one game into the season for the Red Sox off the bench, on April 29, 1957, the Red Sox traded Bolling along with Russ Kemmerer and Faye Throneberry to the Washington Senators for Bob Chakales and Dean Stone. Milt was immediately put to work with the Senators, starting at shortstop occasionally in May and June before becoming their everyday starter from July through the end of the season. Bolling split time between second base and shortstop, committing 11 errors. His bat was cold once again, hitting .227 with four home runs and 19 RBIs in 91 games.

== Detroit Tigers and retirement ==
On February 25, 1958, the Senators traded Bolling to the Cleveland Indians for Pete Mesa. It didn't work out, however, as a month later the Indians swapped him with the Detroit Tigers for Pete Wojey and $20,000. He became teammates with his brother, Frank Bolling, a five-year veteran for the Tigers as their starting second baseman. Despite the connection to his brother, Milt struggled to find playing time throughout the season. He started several games in April before being sidelined for a few days with a virus attack, and afterward playing time was scarce. Milt played his final Major League game on July 28, ending his season with a .194 average in just 31 at bats.

After his playing days, Bolling spent more than 30 years with the Red Sox, first as an executive assistant to owner Tom Yawkey, and later as an area scout based in Alabama.

== Personal life and death ==
Bolling attended Spring Hill College. In late 2012, he underwent open-heart surgery. His health had declined since the surgery. He died on January 19, 2013.
