= 1980 United States House of Representatives elections in New Jersey =

- November 4, 1980

All 15 New Jersey seats to the United States House of Representatives
- Turnout: 80% (▲23pp)
	Majority party	Minority party
Party	Democratic	Republican
Last election	10	5
Seats won	8	7
Seat change	▼2	▲2
Popular vote	1,316,100	1,368,981
Percentage	48.0%	49.9%
Swing	▼6.0pp	▲6.6pp
Democratic
40–50%
50–60%
60–70%
70–80%
Republican
50–60%
60–70%
70–80%

The 1980 United States House of Representatives elections in New Jersey were held on November 4, 1980, to determine who would represent the people of New Jersey in the United States House of Representatives. This election coincided with national elections for President, U.S. House and U.S. Senate. New Jersey had fifteen seats in the House, apportioned according to the 1970 United States census. Representatives are elected for two-year terms.

== Overview ==
1980 United States House of Representatives elections in New Jersey
Party	Votes	Percentage	Candidates	Seats	+/–
Democratic	1,316,100	48.01%	15	8	▼2
Republican	1,368,981	49.94%	15	7	▲2
Libertarian	27,572	1.01%	15	0	Steady
Citizens	3,025	0.11%	2	0	Steady
Socialist Labor	2,923	0.11%	4	0	Steady
Socialist Workers	1,869	0.07%	2	0	Steady
Constitution	666	0.02%	1	0	Steady
Socialist	643	0.02%	1	0	Steady
Independents	47,188	1.72%	13	0	Steady
Totals	2,741,395	100.00%	54	15	Steady

== District 1 ==
1980 New Jersey's 1st congressional district election
- November 4, 1980
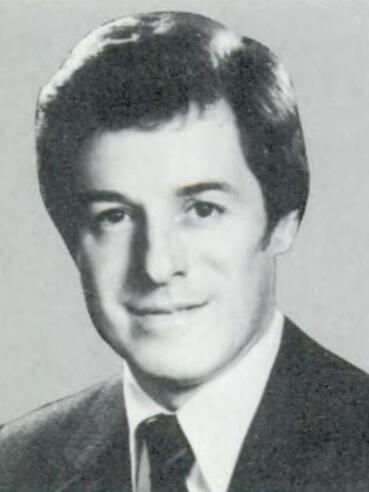

Nominee	James Florio	Scott Sibert
Party	Democratic	Republican
Popular vote	147,352	42,154
Percentage	76.7%	21.9%
U.S. Representative before election
James Florio
Democratic
Elected U.S. Representative
James Florio
Democratic

Incumbent James Florio won. The district included Gloucester County and parts of Camden County.

=== Democratic primary ===
==== Candidates ====
- James Florio, incumbent Representative since 1975

==== Results ====
1980 Democratic primary
Party	Candidate	Votes	%
Democratic	James Florio (incumbent)	33,181	100.00%
Total votes		33,181	100.00%

=== Republican primary ===
==== Candidates ====
- Scott L. Sibert

==== Results ====
1980 Republican primary
Party	Candidate	Votes	%
Republican	Scott L. Sibert	9,742	100.00%
Total votes		9,742	100.00%

=== General election ===
==== Candidates ====
- Scott L. Sibert (Republican)
- James Florio, incumbent Representative since 1975 (Republican)
- Julius Levin, perennial candidate (Socialist Labor)
- Thomas S. Watson Jr. (Independent)
- Ronald K. Wishart (Libertarian)

==== Results ====
1980 U.S. House election
Party	Candidate	Votes	%	±%
Democratic	James Florio (incumbent)	147,352	76.71%	
Republican	Scott L. Sibert	42,154	21.95%	
Independent	Thomas S. Watson Jr.	1,327	0.69%	
Libertarian	Ronald K. Wishart	1,029	0.54%	
Socialist Labor	Julius Levin	219	0.11%	
Total votes		192,081	100.00%	
Democratic hold		Swing	{{{swing}}}	

== District 2 ==
1980 New Jersey's 2nd congressional district election
- November 4, 1980
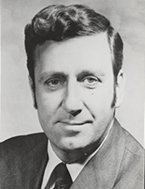

Nominee	William J. Hughes	Beech Fox
Party	Democratic	Republican
Popular vote	135,437	97,072
Percentage	57.5%	41.2%
U.S. Representative before election
William J. Hughes
Democratic
Elected U.S. Representative
William J. Hughes
Democratic

Incumbent William J. Hughes won. This district, the largest in South Jersey, included all of Atlantic, Cape May, Cumberland, and Salem counties and parts of Burlington and Ocean counties.

=== Democratic primary ===
==== Candidates ====
- William J. Hughes, incumbent Representative since 1975

==== Results ====
1980 Democratic primary
Party	Candidate	Votes	%
Democratic	William J. Hughes (incumbent)	15,360	100.00%
Total votes		15,360	100.00%

=== Republican primary ===
==== Candidates ====
- Beech N. Fox, Cape May County sheriff
- John J. Mahoney, chair of the Atlantic County Young Republicans

==== Results ====
1980 Republican primary
Party	Candidate	Votes	%
Republican	Beech N. Fox	19,143	63.42%
Republican	John J. Mahoney	11,041	36.58%
Total votes		30,184	100.00%

=== General election ===
==== Candidates ====
- Beech N. Fox, Cape May County sheriff (Republican)
- Adele Frisch (Socialist Labor)
- William J. Hughes, incumbent Representative since 1975 (Democratic)
- Robert C. Rothhouse (Libertarian)

==== Results ====
1980 U.S. House election
Party	Candidate	Votes	%	±%
Democratic	William J. Hughes (incumbent)	135,437	57.46%	
Republican	Beech N. Fox	97,072	41.18%	
Libertarian	Robert C. Rothhouse	2,262	0.96%	
Socialist Labor	Adele Frisch	939	0.40%	
Total votes		235,710	100.00%	
Democratic hold		Swing	{{{swing}}}	

== District 3 ==
1980 New Jersey's 3rd congressional district election
- November 4, 1980
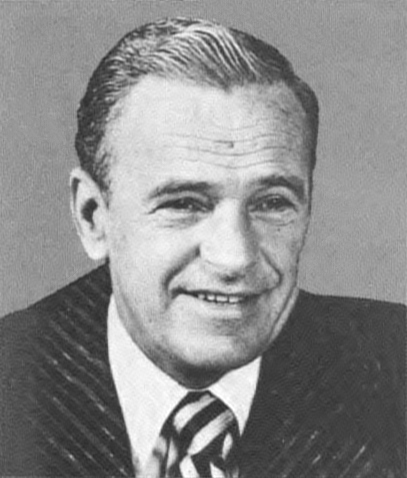

Nominee	James J. Howard	Marie Sheehan Muhler
Party	Democratic	Republican
Popular vote	106,269	104,184
Percentage	49.9%	49.0%
U.S. Representative before election
James J. Howard
Democratic
Elected U.S. Representative
James J. Howard
Democratic

Incumbent James J. Howard won. This district included parts of Monmouth and Ocean counties.

=== Democratic primary ===
==== Candidates ====
- James J. Howard, incumbent Representative since 1965

==== Results ====
1980 Democratic primary
Party	Candidate	Votes	%
Democratic	James J. Howard (incumbent)	20,522	100.00%
Total votes		20,522	100.00%

=== Republican primary ===
==== Candidates ====
- Marie Sheehan Muhler, assemblywoman from Marlboro

==== Results ====
1980 Republican primary
Party	Candidate	Votes	%
Republican	Marie Sheehan Muhler	16,540	100.00%
Total votes		16,540	100.00%

=== General election ===
==== Candidates ====
- Lawrence D. Erickson (Socialist)
- James J. Howard, incumbent Representative since 1965 (Democratic)
- Marie Sheehan Muhler, assemblywoman from Marlboro (Republican)
- Tom Palven (Libertarian)
- L. James Wilson (J.E.B. Party Inc.)

==== Results ====
1980 U.S. House election
Party	Candidate	Votes	%	±%
Democratic	James J. Howard (incumbent)	106,269	49.93%	
Republican	Marie Sheehan Muhler	104,184	48.95%	
Libertarian	Tom Palven	1,450	0.68%	
Socialist	Lawrence D. Erickson	643	0.30%	
Independent	L. James Wilson	284	0.13%	
Total votes		212,830	100.00%	
Democratic hold		Swing	{{{swing}}}	

== District 4 ==
1980 New Jersey's 4th congressional district election
- November 4, 1980
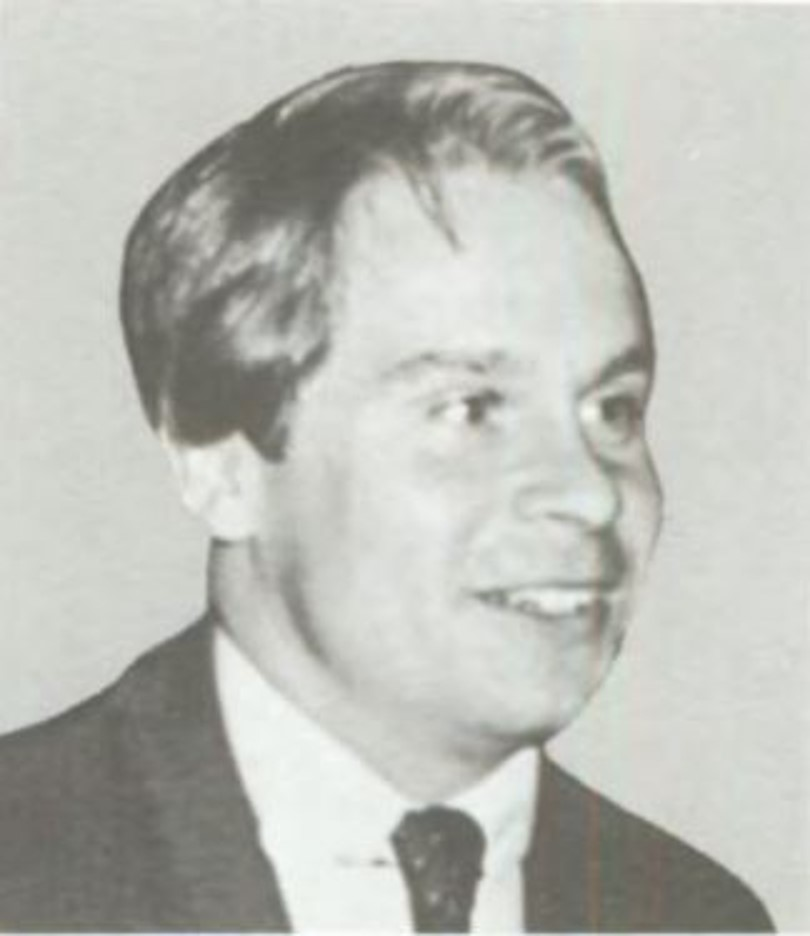

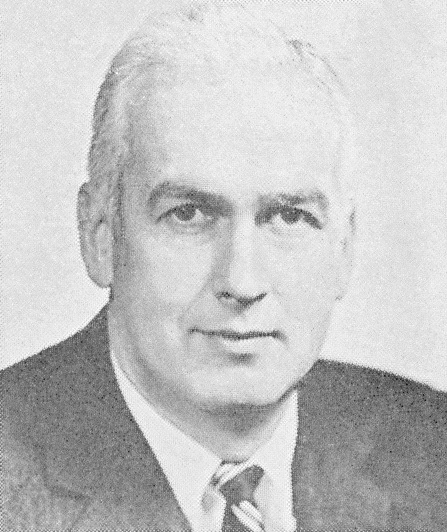
Nominee	Chris Smith	Frank Thompson
Party	Republican	Democratic
Popular vote	95,447	68,480
Percentage	56.6%	40.6%
U.S. Representative before election
Frank Thompson
Democratic
Elected U.S. Representative
Chris Smith
Republican

This district, in Central Jersey, consisted of parts of Burlington, Mercer, Middlesex, and Monmouth counties.

Incumbent Frank Thompson ran for a fourteenth consecutive term in office; however, his campaign was severely damaged by his implication in the Abscam scandal and indictment on bribery charges. Republican Chris Smith, who had also run for the seat in 1978, won.

=== Democratic primary ===
==== Candidates ====
- Frank Thompson, incumbent Representative since 1955

==== Results ====
1980 Democratic primary
Party	Candidate	Votes	%
Democratic	Frank Thompson (incumbent)	20,713	100.00%
Total votes		20,713	100.00%

=== Republican primary ===
==== Candidates ====
- Chris Smith, chair of the New Jersey Right to Life Committee and nominee for this district in 1978
- John D. Scalamonti, former Catholic priest and convert to Orthodox Judaism

==== Declined ====
- Jeff Bell, nominee for U.S. Senate in 1978
- John K. Rafferty, mayor of Hamilton Township

==== Results ====
1980 Republican primary
Party	Candidate	Votes	%
Republican	Chris Smith	8,121	82.89%
Republican	John D. Scalamonti	1,676	17.11%
Total votes		9,797	100.00%

=== General election ===
==== Candidates ====
- Jack Moyers (Libertarian)
- Paul B. Rizzo (Independent)
- Chris Smith, chair of the New Jersey Right to Life Committee and nominee for this district in 1978 (Republican)
- Frank Thompson, incumbent Representative since 1955 (Democratic)

==== Campaign ====
After Thompson was indicted on charges of bribery and conspiracy in connection with the Abscam FBI sting operation, Republicans considered replacing Smith with a more established candidate. Two such potential candidates, 1978 U.S. Senate nominee Jeff Bell and Hamilton Township mayor Jack Rafferty, declined.

==== Results ====
1980 U.S. House election
Party	Candidate	Votes	%	±%
Republican	Chris Smith	95,447	56.64%	
Democratic	Frank Thompson (incumbent)	68,480	40.64%	
Libertarian	Jack Moyers	2,801	1.66%	
Independent	Paul B. Rizzo	1,776	1.05%	
Total votes		168,504	100.00%	
Republican gain from Democratic		Swing	{{{swing}}}	

== District 5 ==
1980 New Jersey's 5th congressional district election
- November 4, 1980
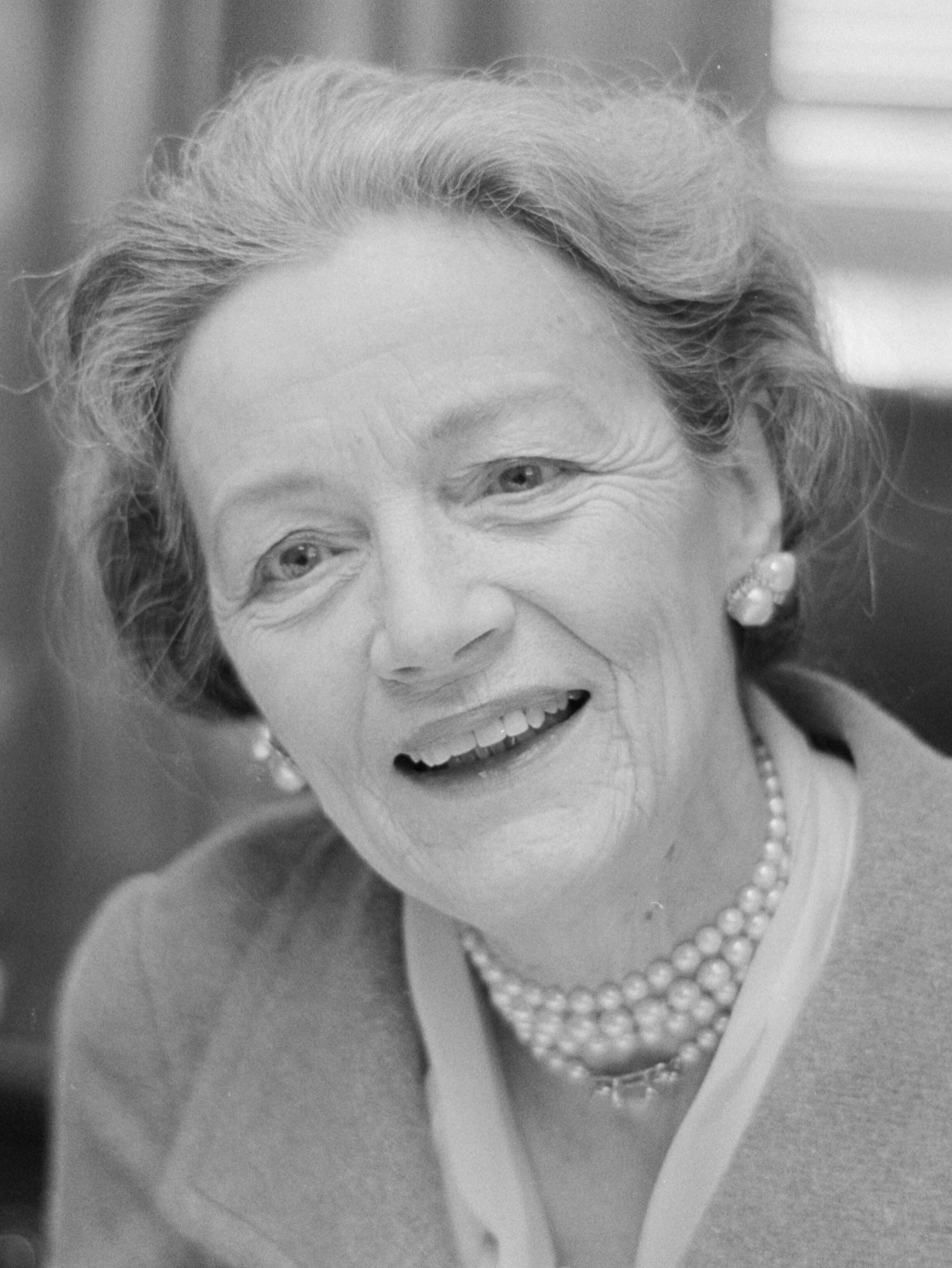

Nominee	Millicent Fenwick	Kieran Pillion
Party	Republican	Democratic
Popular vote	156,016	41,269
Percentage	77.5%	20.5%
U.S. Representative before election
Millicent Fenwick
Republican
Elected U.S. Representative
Millicent Fenwick
Republican

Incumbent Millicent Fenwick won. This district included Somerset County and parts of Essex, Mercer, Middlesex, and Morris counties.

=== Republican primary ===
==== Candidates ====
- Millicent Fenwick, incumbent Representative since 1975
- Larry Haverly, Denville businessman

==== Campaign ====
Haverly spent approximately $30,000 against Fenwick in the primary.

==== Results ====
1980 Republican primary
Party	Candidate	Votes	%
Republican	Millicent Fenwick (incumbent)	23,419	69.91%
Republican	Larry C. A. Haverly	10,080	30.09%
Total votes		33,499	100.00%

=== Democratic primary ===
==== Candidates ====
- Kieran E. Pillion Jr., Millington lawyer
- William R. Norris II, Neshanic Station history teacher

==== Results ====
1980 Democratic primary
Party	Candidate	Votes	%
Democratic	Kieran E. Pillion Jr.	6,839	51.24%
Democratic	William R. Norris II	6,507	48.76%
Total votes		13,346	100.00%

=== General election ===
==== Candidates ====
- Millicent Fenwick, incumbent Representative since 1975 (Republican)
- Jasper C. Gould (Contempt of Court)
- Kieran E. Pillion Jr., Millington lawyer (Democratic)
- Carl R. Samson (Libertarian)

==== Campaign ====
In the general election, Fenwick and Pillion agreed to a spending cap of $22,500. Ultimately, Pillion was only able to raise about $7,200. Fenwick's campaign was managed by future state senator Kip Bateman. Pillion argued that he would be better positioned to attract federal funding to solve flooding issues in the district because he was a member of the same party as President Carter.

==== Results ====
1980 U.S. House election
Party	Candidate	Votes	%	±%
Republican	Millicent Fenwick (incumbent)	156,016	77.50%	
Democratic	Kieran E. Pillion Jr.	41,269	20.50%	
Libertarian	Carl R. Samson	2,465	1.22%	
Independent	Jasper C. Gould	1,549	0.77%	
Total votes		201,299	100.00%	
Turnout		134,220	46.32%	
Republican hold		Swing	{{{swing}}}	

== District 6 ==
1980 New Jersey's 6th congressional district election
- November 4, 1980
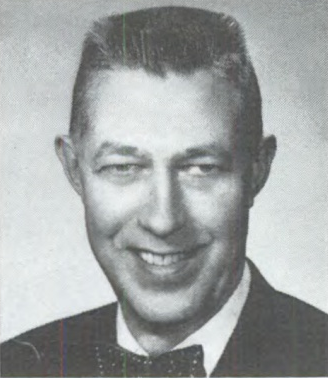

Nominee	Edwin B. Forsythe	Lewis Weinstein
Party	Republican	Democratic
Popular vote	125,792	92,227
Percentage	56.3%	41.3%
U.S. Representative before election
Edwin B. Forsythe
Republican
Elected U.S. Representative
Edwin B. Forsythe
Republican

This district included parts of Burlington, Camden, and Ocean counties.

Incumbent Republican Edwin B. Forsythe won.

=== Republican primary ===
==== Candidates ====
- Richard D. Amber, candidate for this district in 1978
- Edwin B. Forsythe, incumbent Representative from Moorestown since 1970

==== Results ====
1980 Republican primary
Party	Candidate	Votes	%
Republican	Edwin B. Forsythe (incumbent)	18,768	89.82%
Republican	Richard D. Amber	2,126	10.18%
Total votes		20,894	100.00%

=== Democratic primary ===
==== Candidates ====
- Alene S. Ammond, former state senator from Cherry Hill
- Bruce MacNaul, Burlington County Surrogate
- Lewis M. Weinstein, former Cherry Hill township manager

==== Results ====
1980 Democratic primary
Party	Candidate	Votes	%
Democratic	Lewis M. Weinstein	9,713	36.51%
Democratic	Bruce MacNaul	8,535	32.08%
Democratic	Alene S. Ammond	8,357	31.41%
Total votes		26,605	100.00%

=== General election ===
==== Candidates ====
- Bernardo S. Doganiero, perennial candidate (Socialist Labor)
- Virginia A. Flynn (Libertarian)
- Edwin B. Forsythe, incumbent Representative from Moorestown since 1970 (Republican)
- John Kinnevy III (Citizens)
- Donald L. Smith (Constitution)
- Lewis M. Weinstein, former Cherry Hill township manager (Democratic)

==== Results ====
1980 U.S. House election
Party	Candidate	Votes	%	±%
Republican	Edwin B. Forsythe (incumbent)	125,792	56.34%	
Democratic	Lewis M. Weinstein	92,227	41.31%	
Libertarian	Virginia A. Flynn	2,165	0.97%	
Citizens	John Kinnevy III	1,848	0.83%	
Constitution	Donald L. Smith	666	0.30%	
Socialist Labor	Bernardo S. Doganiero	556	0.25%	
Total votes		223,254	100.00%	
Republican hold		Swing	{{{swing}}}	

== District 7 ==
1980 New Jersey's 7th congressional district election
- November 4, 1980
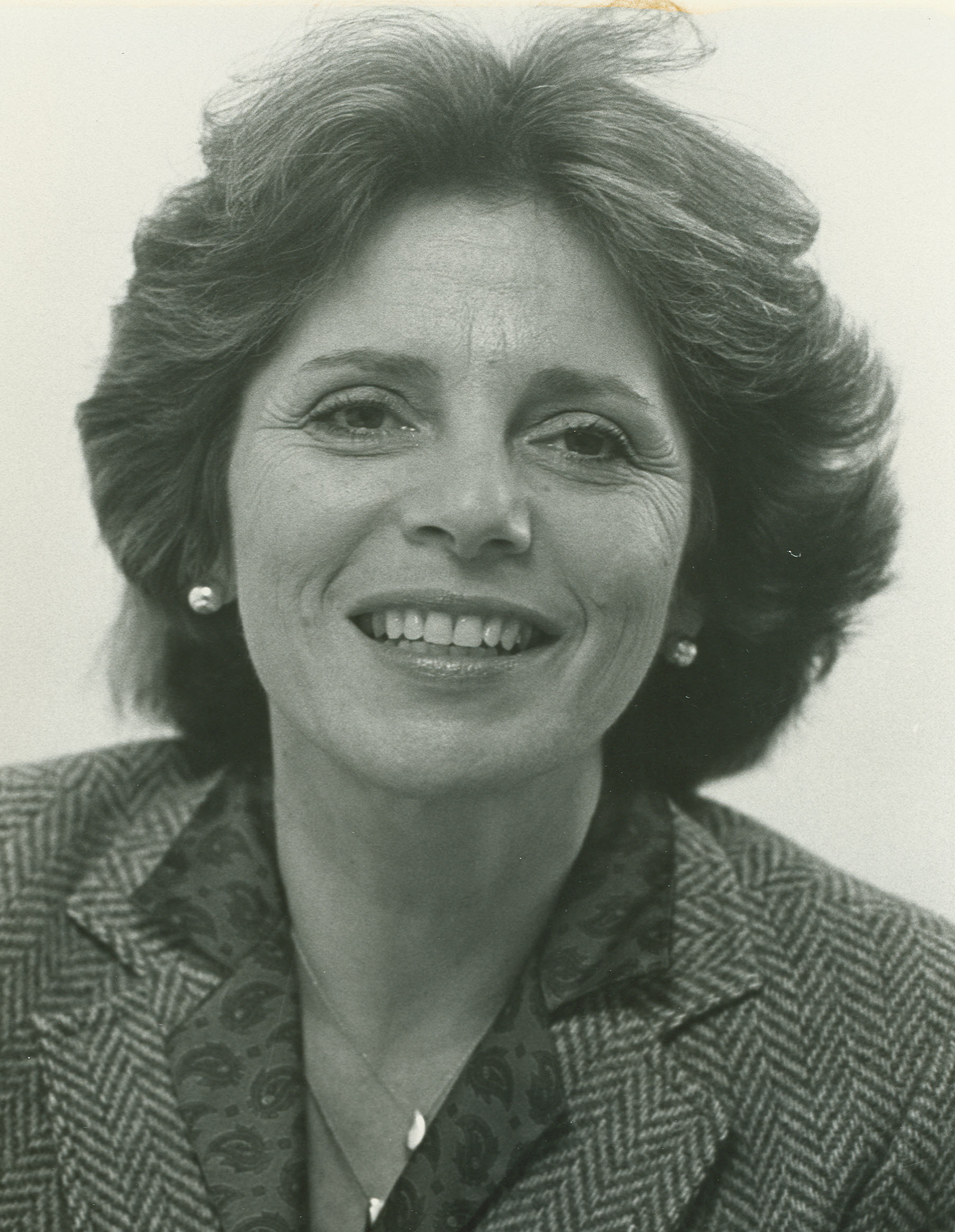

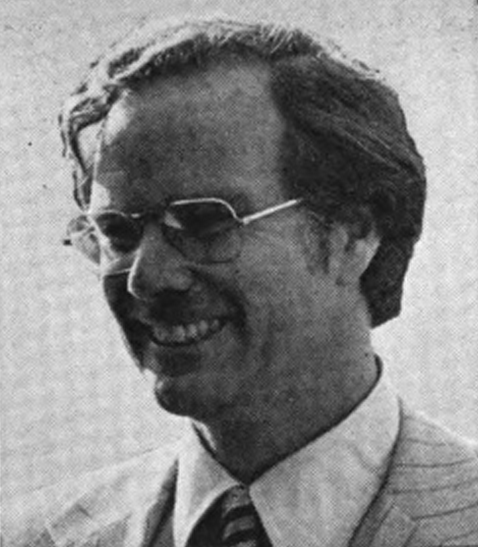
Nominee	Marge Roukema	Andrew Maguire
Party	Republican	Democratic
Popular vote	108,760	99,737
Percentage	50.8%	46.6%
U.S. Representative before election
Andrew Maguire
Democratic
Elected U.S. Representative
Marge Roukema
Republican

This district included western parts of Bergen County. Incumbent Andrew Maguire ran for a fourth term in office but was defeated by Marge Roukema in a rematch of the 1978 campaign.

=== Democratic primary ===
==== Candidates ====
- Andrew Maguire, incumbent Representative since 1975

==== Results ====
1980 Democratic primary
Party	Candidate	Votes	%
Democratic	Andrew Maguire (incumbent)	23,452	100.00%
Total votes		23,452	100.00%

=== Republican primary ===
==== Candidates ====
- Marge Roukema, former member of the Ridgewood Board of Education and nominee for this district in 1978

==== Results ====
1980 Republican primary
Party	Candidate	Votes	%
Republican	Marge Roukema	16,880	100.00%
Total votes		16,880	100.00%

=== General election ===
==== Candidates ====
- Andrew Maguire, incumbent Representative since 1975 (Democratic)
- Patrick Randazzo (Pro-Life Independent)
- Marge Roukema, former member of the Ridgewood Board of Education and nominee for this district in 1978 (Republican)
- Robert Shapiro (Libertarian)
- Martin E. Wendelken (Independent)

==== Results ====
1980 U.S. House election
Party	Candidate	Votes	%	±%
Republican	Marge Roukema	108,760	50.85%	
Democratic	Andrew Maguire (incumbent)	99,737	46.63%	
Independent	Patrick Randazzo	3,594	1.68%	
Libertarian	Robert Shapiro	1,640	0.77%	
Independent	Martin E. Wendelken	612	0.29%	
Total votes		213,893	100.00%	
Republican gain from Democratic		Swing	{{{swing}}}	

== District 8 ==
1980 New Jersey's 8th congressional district election
- November 4, 1980
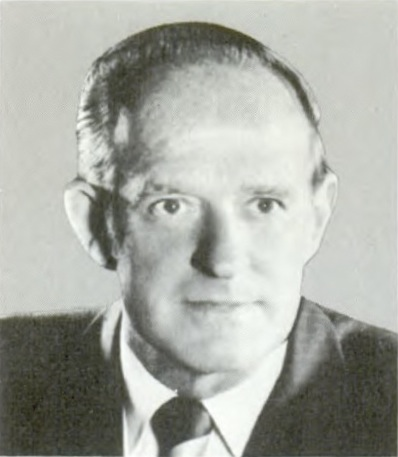

Nominee	Robert A. Roe	William Cleveland
Party	Democratic	Republican
Popular vote	116,128	44,625
Percentage	67.2%	31.4%
U.S. Representative before election
Robert A. Roe
Democratic
Elected U.S. Representative
Robert A. Roe
Democratic

This district included parts of Bergen and Passaic counties. Incumbent Robert Roe won.

=== Democratic primary ===
==== Candidates ====
- Robert A. Roe, incumbent Representative from Wayne since 1969

==== Results ====
1980 Democratic primary
Party	Candidate	Votes	%
Democratic	Robert A. Roe (incumbent)	14,662	100.00%
Total votes		14,662	100.00%

=== Republican primary ===
==== Candidates ====
- William R. Cleveland

==== Results ====
1980 Republican primary
Party	Candidate	Votes	%
Republican	William R. Cleveland	7,072	100.00%
Total votes		7,072	100.00%

=== General election ===
==== Candidates ====
- William R. Cleveland (Republican)
- Michael Horowitz (Libertarian)
- Donald Rabel (Socialist Labor)
- Robert A. Roe, incumbent Representative from Wayne since 1969 (Democratic)

==== Results ====
1980 U.S. House election
Party	Candidate	Votes	%	±%
Democratic	Robert A. Roe (incumbent)	95,493	67.15%	
Republican	William R. Cleveland	44,625	31.38%	
Socialist Labor	Donna Rabel	1,209	0.85%	
Libertarian	Michael Horowitz	874	0.61%	
Total votes		142,201	100.00%	
Democratic hold		Swing	{{{swing}}}	

== District 9 ==
1980 New Jersey's 9th congressional district election
- November 4, 1980
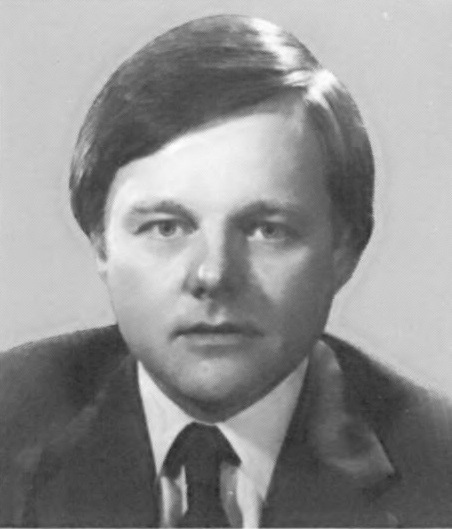

Nominee	Harold C. Hollenbeck	Gabriel Ambrosio
Party	Republican	Democratic
Popular vote	116,128	75,321
Percentage	59.1%	38.3%
U.S. Representative before election
Harold C. Hollenbeck
Republican
Elected U.S. Representative
Harold C. Hollenbeck
Republican

This district consisted of parts of Bergen and Hudson counties. Incumbent Harold C. Hollenbeck won.

As of 2025, this is the most recent election in which a Republican was elected to represent any portion of Hudson County in the House.

=== Republican primary ===
==== Candidates ====
- Harold Hollenbeck, incumbent Representative from East Rutherford since 1977

==== Results ====
1980 Republican primary
Party	Candidate	Votes	%
Republican	Harold C. Hollenbeck (incumbent)	12,050	100.00%
Total votes		12,050	100.00%

=== Democratic primary ===
==== Candidates ====
- Gabriel M. Ambrosio, Lyndhurst attorney and candidate for Bergen County Freeholder in 1979
- Henry Helstoski, former Representative and independent candidate for this district in 1978
- Burt Ross, former mayor of Fort Lee

===== Withdrew =====
- Stephen M. Bunda, doctoral student and Bergen County political consultant
- S. Sanford Schlitt, car dealer

==== Declined ====
- Bob Torricelli, former aide to governor Brendan Byrne and advisor to the Jimmy Carter 1980 presidential campaign

==== Results ====
1980 Democratic primary
Party	Candidate	Votes	%
Democratic	Gabriel M. Ambrosio	16,804	41.41%
Democratic	Burt Ross	14,417	35.53%
Democratic	Henry Helstoski	9,359	23.06%
Total votes		40,580	100.00%

=== General election ===
==== Candidates ====
- Gabriel M. Ambrosio, Lyndhurst attorney (Democratic)
- Edward G. Davis (Citizens)
- Harold Hollenbeck, incumbent Representative from East Rutherford since 1977 (Republican)
- Henry Koch (Libertarian)
- Herbert Shaw (Politicians Are Crooks)

==== Results ====
1980 U.S. House election
Party	Candidate	Votes	%	±%
Republican	Harold C. Hollenbeck (inc.)	116,128	59.10%	
Democratic	Gabriel M. Ambrosio	75,321	38.33%	
Libertarian	Henry Koch	2,290	1.17%	
Independent	Herbert H. Shaw	1,588	0.81%	
Citizens	Edward G. Davis	1,177	0.60%	
Total votes		196,504	100.00%	
Republican hold		Swing	{{{swing}}}	

== District 10 ==
1980 New Jersey's 10th congressional district election
- November 4, 1980
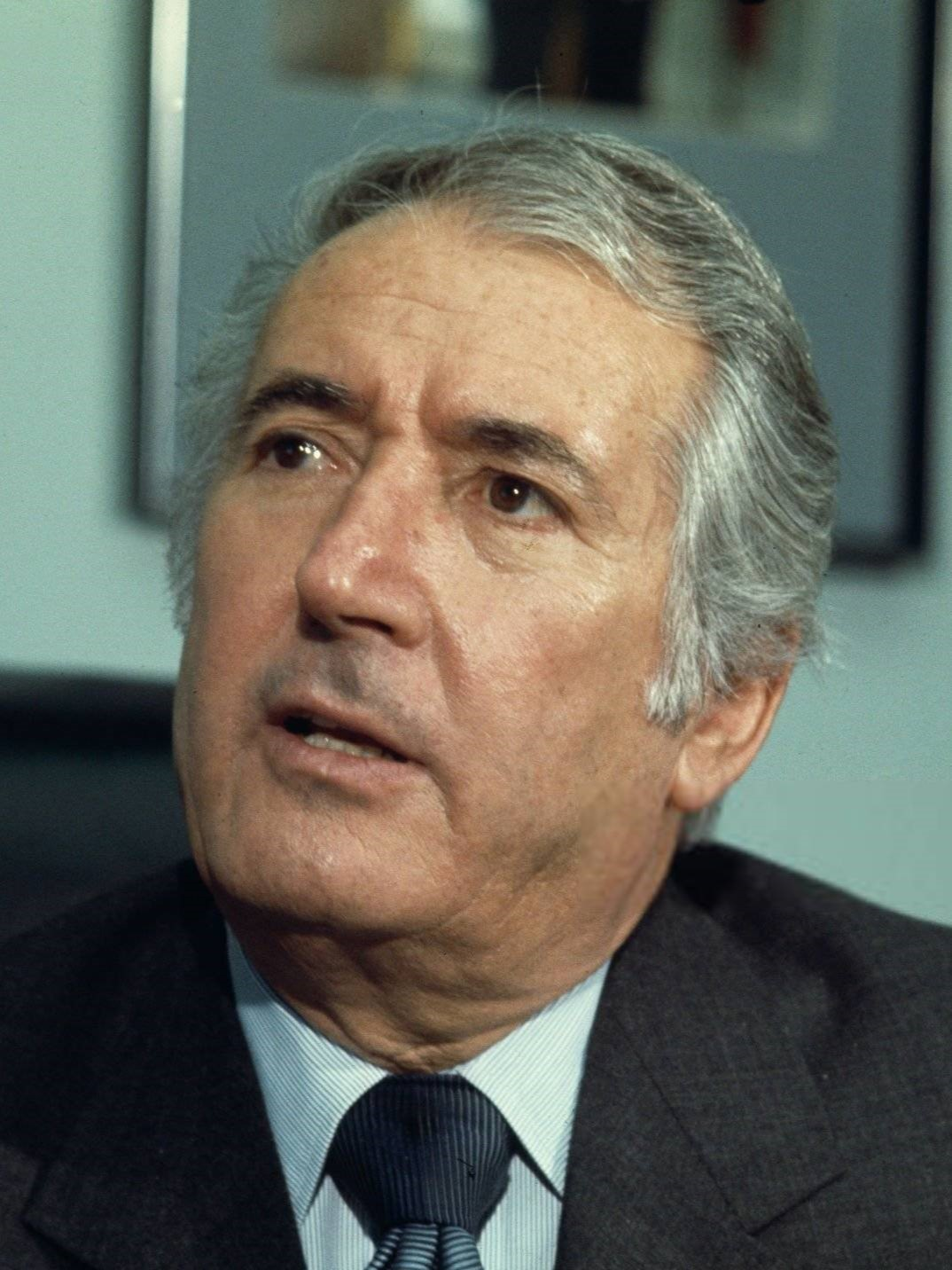

Nominee	Peter W. Rodino	Everett Jennings
Party	Democratic	Republican
Popular vote	76,154	11,778
Percentage	85.3%	13.2%
U.S. Representative before election
Peter W. Rodino
Democratic
Elected U.S. Representative
Peter W. Rodino
Democratic

The district included parts of Essex and Hudson counties. Incumbent Democrat Peter W. Rodino won.

=== Democratic primary ===
==== Candidates ====
- Russell Fox, reverend of Mount Olive Baptist Church
- Golden E. Johnson, former Newark Municipal Court judge
- Donald M. Payne, former Essex County Freeholder
- Peter W. Rodino, incumbent Representative since 1949

==== Results ====
1980 Democratic primary
Party	Candidate	Votes	%
Democratic	Peter W. Rodino (incumbent)	26,943	62.17%
Democratic	Donald M. Payne	9,825	22.67%
Democratic	Golden E. Johnson	5,316	12.27%
Democratic	Russell Fox	1,251	2.89%
Total votes		43,335	100.00%

=== Republican primary ===
==== Candidates ====
- Everett J. Jennings

==== Results ====
1980 Republican primary
Party	Candidate	Votes	%
Republican	Everett J. Jennings	2,174	100.00%
Total votes		2,174	100.00%

=== General election ===
==== Candidates ====
- Christine Hildebrand (Socialist Workers)
- Everett J. Jennings (Republican)
- Christine Keno (Human Rights Ratification)
- Ronald Penque (Libertarian)
- Peter W. Rodino, incumbent Representative since 1949 (Democratic)
- Frankie Lee Scott (Youth Against Draft)

==== Results ====
1980 U.S. House election
Party	Candidate	Votes	%	±%
Democratic	Peter W. Rodino (inc.)	76,154	85.33%	
Republican	Everett J. Jennings	11,778	13.20%	
Independent	Christine Keno	542	0.61%	
Independent	Frankie Lee Scott	281	0.31%	
Libertarian	Ronald Penque	271	0.30%	
Socialist Workers	Christine Hildebrand	219	0.25%	
Total votes		89,245	100.00%	
Democratic hold		Swing	{{{swing}}}	

== District 11 ==
1980 New Jersey's 11th congressional district election
- November 4, 1980
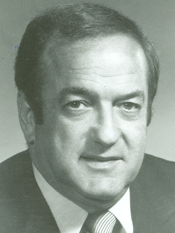

Nominee	Joseph Minish	Robert Davis
Party	Democratic	Republican
Popular vote	106,155	57,772
Percentage	63.0%	34.3%
U.S. Representative before election
Joseph Minish
Democratic
Elected U.S. Representative
Joseph Minish
Democratic

This district consisted of parts of Bergen, Essex, Passaic, and Union counties. Incumbent Democrat Joseph Minish won.

=== Democratic primary ===
==== Candidates ====
- Joseph Minish, incumbent Representative from West Orange since 1963

==== Results ====
1980 Democratic primary
Party	Candidate	Votes	%
Democratic	Joseph Minish (incumbent)	28,491	100.00%
Total votes		28,491	100.00%

=== Republican primary ===
==== Candidates ====
- Robert A. Davis

==== Results ====
1980 Republican primary
Party	Candidate	Votes	%
Republican	Robert A. Davis	12,298	100.00%
Total votes		12,298	100.00%

=== General election ===
==== Candidates ====
- Jon Britton (Socialist Workers)
- Robert A. Davis (Republican)
- Joseph Minish, incumbent Representative from West Orange since 1963 (Democratic)
- Richard S. Roth (Libertarian)
- Robert G. Trugman (The Independent Alternative)

==== Resultsd ====
1980 U.S. House election
Party	Candidate	Votes	%	±%
Democratic	Joseph Minish (incumbent)	106,155	62.99%	
Republican	Robert A. Davis	57,772	34.28%	
Socialist Workers	Jon Britton	1,650	0.98%	
Independent	Robert G. Trugman	1,630	0.97%	
Libertarian	Richard S. Roth	1,317	0.78%	
Total votes		168,524	100.00%	
Democratic hold		Swing	{{{swing}}}	

== District 12 ==
1980 New Jersey's 12th congressional district election
- November 4, 1980
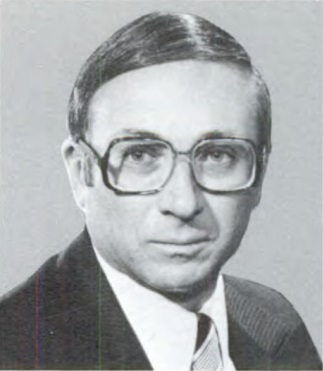

Nominee	Matt Rinaldo	Rose Monyek
Party	Republican	Democratic
Popular vote	134,973	36,577
Percentage	77.1%	20.9%
U.S. Representative before election
Matt Rinaldo
Republican
Elected U.S. Representative
Matt Rinaldo
Republican

This district included parts of Union County. Incumbent Matt Rinaldo won.

=== Republican primary ===
==== Candidates ====
- Matt Rinaldo, incumbent Representative from Union since 1973

==== Results ====
1980 Republican primary
Party	Candidate	Votes	%
Republican	Matt Rinaldo (incumbent)	17,431	100.00%
Total votes		17,431	100.00%

=== Democratic primary ===
==== Candidates ====
- Charles A. Leary
- Rose Zeidwerg Monyek

==== Results ====
1980 Democratic primary
Party	Candidate	Votes	%
Democratic	Rose Zeidwerg Monyek	9,085	52.80%
Democratic	Charles A. Leary	8,120	47.20%
Total votes		17,205	100.00%

=== General election ===
==== Candidates ====
- David-Leif Jensen (Independent for Congress)
- Rose Zeidwerg Monyek (Democratic)
- Matt Rinaldo, incumbent Representative from Union since 1973 (Republican)
- William Vandersteel (Libertarian)

==== Results ====
1980 U.S. House election
Party	Candidate	Votes	%	±%
Republican	Matt Rinaldo (incumbent)	134,973	77.12%	
Democratic	Rose Zeidwerg Monyek	36,577	20.90%	
Independent	David-Leif Jensen	2,358	1.35%	
Libertarian	William Vandersteel	1,118	0.64%	
Total votes		175,026	100.00%	
Republican hold		Swing	{{{swing}}}	

== District 13 ==
1980 New Jersey's 13th congressional district election
- November 4, 1980
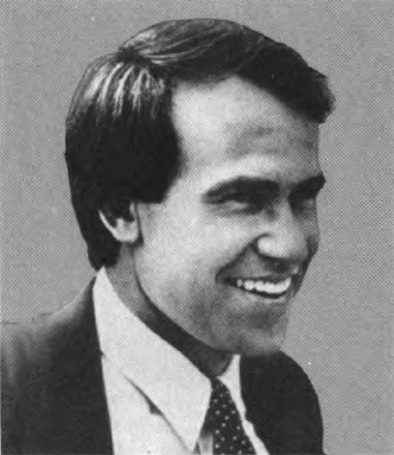

Nominee	Jim Courter	Dave Stickle
Party	Republican	Democratic
Popular vote	152,862	56,251
Percentage	71.6%	26.4%
U.S. Representative before election
Jim Courter
Republican
Elected U.S. Representative
Jim Courter
Republican

This sprawling district included Hunterdon, Sussex, and Warren counties and parts of Mercer and Morris counties. Incumbent Representative Jim Courter won.

=== Republican primary ===
==== Candidates ====
- Jim Courter, incumbent Representative from Hackettstown since 1979

==== Results ====
1980 Republican primary
Party	Candidate	Votes	%
Republican	Jim Courter (incumbent)	25,779	100.00%
Total votes		25,779	100.00%

=== Democratic primary ===
==== Candidates ====
- Edward J. Baker
- Carl A. Mottey
- Ray Rollinson
- Roger A. Singerling
- Dave Stickle, Pompton Plains warehouse manager

==== Results ====
1980 Democratic primary
Party	Candidate	Votes	%
Democratic	Dave Stickle	8,064	40.03%
Democratic	Edward J. Baker	4,678	23.22%
Democratic	Carl A. Mottey	3,972	19.72%
Democratic	Ray Rollinson	2,272	11.28%
Democratic	Roger A. Singerling	1,160	5.76%
Total votes		20,146	100.00%

=== General election ===
==== Candidates ====
- Jim Courter, incumbent Representative from Hackettstown since 1979 (Republican)
- John S. Schafer (Libertarian)
- Dave Stickle, Pompton Plains warehouse manager (Democratic)

==== Results ====
1980 U.S. House election
Party	Candidate	Votes	%	±%
Republican	Jim Courter (incumbent)	152,862	71.64%	
Democratic	Dave Stickle	56,251	26.36%	
Libertarian	John S. Schafer	4,260	2.00%	
Total votes		213,373	100.00%	
Republican hold		Swing	{{{swing}}}	

== District 14 ==
1980 New Jersey's 14th congressional district election
- November 4, 1980
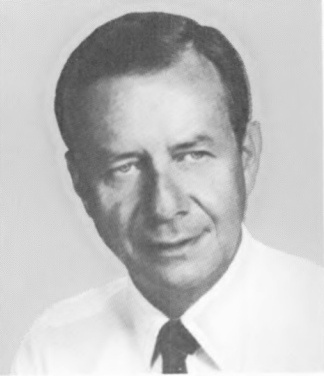

Nominee	Frank Guarini	Dennis Teti
Party	Democratic	Republican
Popular vote	86,921	45,606
Percentage	64.2%	33.7%
U.S. Representative before election
Frank J. Guarini
Democratic
Elected U.S. Representative
Frank J. Guarini
Democratic

This district included parts of Hudson County. Incumbent Democrat Frank J. Guarini won.

=== Democratic primary ===
==== Candidates ====
- Frank J. Guarini, incumbent Representative since 1979

==== Results ====
1980 Democratic primary
Party	Candidate	Votes	%
Democratic	Frank J. Guarini (incumbent)	40,825	100.00%
Total votes		40,825	100.00%

=== Republican primary ===
==== Candidates ====
- Dennis Teti, Weehawken insurance broker

==== Results ====
1980 Republican primary
Party	Candidate	Votes	%
Republican	Dennis Teti	3,371	100.00%
Total votes		3,371	100.00%

=== General election ===
==== Candidates ====
- Kenneth Famularo (Action Talks)
- Frank J. Guarini, incumbent Representative since 1979 (Democratic)
- Jonathan Steele (LIbertarian)
- Dennis Teti, Weehawken insurance broker (Republican)

==== Results ====
1980 U.S. House election
Party	Candidate	Votes	%	±%
Democratic	Frank J. Guarini (incumbent)	86,921	64.18%	
Republican	Dennis Teti	45,606	33.67%	
Libertarian	Jonathan Steele	1,765	1.30%	
Independent	Kenneth Famularo	1,138	0.84%	
Total votes		135,430	100.00%	
Democratic hold		Swing	{{{swing}}}	

== District 15 ==
1980 New Jersey's 15th congressional district election
- November 4, 1980
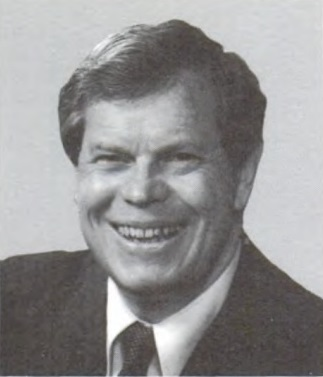

Nominee	Bernard J. Dwyer	William O'Sullivan
Party	Democratic	Republican
Popular vote	92,457	75,812
Percentage	53.4%	43.8%
U.S. Representative before election
Edward J. Patten
Democratic
Elected U.S. Representative
Bernard J. Dwyer
Democratic

This district included parts of Middlesex and Union counties. Incumbent Democrat Edward Patten did not run for re-election to a tenth term in office. Bernard J. Dwyer won the open seat.

=== Democratic primary ===
==== Candidates ====
- Bernard J. Dwyer, state senator and former mayor of Edison
- Richard Pucci, Perth Amboy business director
- David C. Schwartz, assemblyman from Highland Park and former Rutgers University professor
- Doris Sios, Felician College administrator
- George A. Spadoro, Edison attorney and candidate for this district in 1978

==== Declined ====
- Edward J. Patten, incumbent Representative since 1963
- Thomas Molyneux, Middlesex County Clerk
- Anthony Yelencsics, mayor of Edison

==== Results ====
1980 Democratic primary
Party	Candidate	Votes	%
Democratic	Bernard J. Dwyer	16,328	32.03%
Democratic	David C. Schwartz	12,800	25.11%
Democratic	George A. Spadoro	12,329	24.18%
Democratic	Richard Pucci	7,720	15.14%
Democratic	Doris Sipos	1,806	3.54%
Total votes		50,983	100.00%

=== Republican primary ===
==== Candidates ====
- William J. O'Sullivan Jr., Middlesex County Republican Party treasurer
- Charles W. Wiley, freelance journalist and nominee for this district in 1978

==== Results ====
1980 Republican primary
Party	Candidate	Votes	%
Republican	William J. O'Sullivan Jr.	4,538	54.19%
Republican	Charles W. Wiley	3,836	45.81%
Total votes		8,374	100.00%

=== General election ===
==== Candidates ====
- Bernard J. Dwyer, state senator and former mayor of Edison (Democratic)
- Charles M. Hart (Libertarian)
- Ira W. Mintz (People's Independent Coalition)
- William J. O'Sullivan Jr. (Republican)

==== Results ====
1980 U.S. House election
Party	Candidate	Votes	%	±%
Democratic	Bernard J. Dwyer	92,457	53.42%	
Republican	William J. O'Sullivan Jr.	75,812	43.80%	
Independent	Ira W. Mintz	2,937	1.70%	
Libertarian	Charles M. Hart	1,865	1.08%	
Total votes		173,071	100.00%	
Democratic hold		Swing	{{{swing}}}	
