= 1978 United States House of Representatives elections in New Jersey =

- November 7, 1978

All 15 New Jersey seats to the United States House of Representatives
- Turnout: 57% (▼24pp)
	Majority party	Minority party
Party	Democratic	Republican
Last election	11	4
Seats won	10	5
Seat change	▼1	▲1
Popular vote	1,043,747	837,783
Percentage	54.0%	43.3%
Swing	▼0.7pp	Steady
Democratic
40–50%
50–60%
60–70%
70–80%
Republican
40–50%
50–60%
60–70%
70–80%

The 1978 United States House of Representatives elections in New Jersey were held on November 7, 1978, to determine who would represent the people of New Jersey in the United States House of Representatives. This election coincided with national elections for U.S. House and U.S. Senate. New Jersey had fifteen seats in the House, apportioned according to the 1970 United States census. Representatives are elected for two-year terms.

== Overview ==
1978 United States House of Representatives elections in New Jersey
Party	Votes	Percentage	Candidates	Seats	+/–
Democratic	1,043,747	53.97%	15	10	▼1
Republican	837,783	43.32%	15	5	▲1
Libertarian	5,169	0.27%	5	0	Steady
Socialist Labor	1,755	0.09%	3	0	Steady
US Labor	1,196	0.06%	3	0	Steady
Independents	44,273	2.29%	8	0	Steady
Totals	1,933,923	100.00%		15	Steady

== District 1 ==
1978 New Jersey's 1st congressional district election
- November 7, 1978
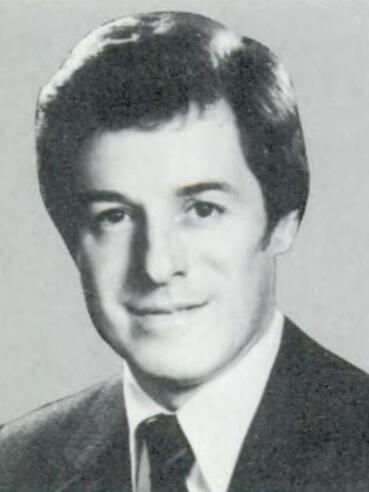

Nominee	James Florio	Robert Deitch
Party	Democratic	Republican
Popular vote	106,096	26,853
Percentage	76.7%	20.1%
U.S. Representative before election
James Florio
Democratic
Elected U.S. Representative
James Florio
Democratic

Incumbent Democrat James Florio won. The district included Gloucester County and parts of Camden County.

=== Democratic primary ===
==== Candidates ====
- James Florio, incumbent Representative since 1975

==== Results ====
1978 Democratic primary
Party	Candidate	Votes	%
Democratic	James Florio (incumbent)	30,480	100.00%
Total votes		30,480	100.00%

=== Republican primary ===
==== Candidates ====
- Robert M. Deitch, Sicklerville resident

==== Results ====
1978 Republican primary
Party	Candidate	Votes	%
Republican	Robert M. Deitch	9,898	100.00%
Total votes		9,898	100.00%

=== General election ===
==== Candidates ====
- Robert M. Deitch, Sicklerville resident (Republican)
- James Florio, incumbent Representative since 1975 (Republican)
- Julius Levin, perennial candidate (Socialist Labor)

==== Results ====
1978 U.S. House election
Party	Candidate	Votes	%	±%
Democratic	James Florio (incumbent)	106,096	79.40%	
Republican	Robert M. Deitch	26,853	20.09%	
Socialist Labor	Julius Levin	671	0.50%	
Total votes		133,620	100.00%	
Democratic hold		Swing	{{{swing}}}	

== District 2 ==
1978 New Jersey's 2nd congressional district election
- November 7, 1978
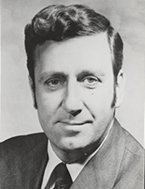

Nominee	William J. Hughes	James H. Biggs
Party	Democratic	Republican
Popular vote	112,768	56,997
Percentage	66.4%	33.6%
U.S. Representative before election
William J. Hughes
Democratic
Elected U.S. Representative
William J. Hughes
Democratic

Incumbent William J. Hughes won. This district, the largest in South Jersey, included all of Atlantic, Cape May, Cumberland, and Salem counties and parts of Burlington and Ocean counties.

=== Democratic primary ===
==== Candidates ====
- William J. Hughes, incumbent Representative since 1975

==== Results ====
1978 Democratic primary
Party	Candidate	Votes	%
Democratic	William J. Hughes (incumbent)	16,821	100.00%
Total votes		16,821	100.00%

=== Republican primary ===
==== Candidates ====
- James H. Biggs, Methodist minister and former mayor of Island Heights

==== Results ====
1978 Republican primary
Party	Candidate	Votes	%
Republican	James H. Biggs	25,899	100.00%
Total votes		25,899	100.00%

=== General election ===
==== Candidates ====
- James H. Biggs, Methodist minister and former mayor of Island Heights (Republican)
- William J. Hughes, incumbent Representative since 1975 (Democratic)

==== Results ====
1978 U.S. House election
Party	Candidate	Votes	%	±%
Democratic	William J. Hughes (incumbent)	112,768	66.43%	
Republican	James H. Biggs	56,997	33.57%	
Total votes		169,765	100.00%	
Democratic hold		Swing	{{{swing}}}	

== District 3 ==
1978 New Jersey's 3rd congressional district election
- November 7, 1978
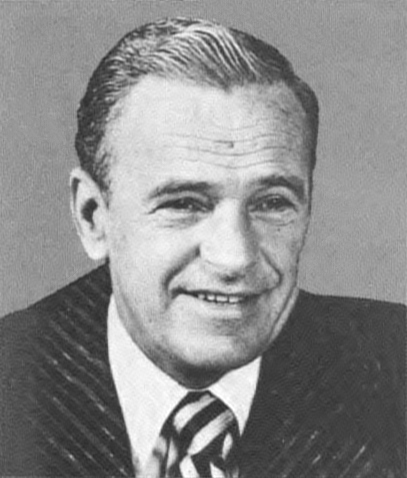

Nominee	James J. Howard	Bruce G. Coe
Party	Democratic	Republican
Popular vote	83,349	64,730
Percentage	56.0%	43.5%
U.S. Representative before election
James J. Howard
Democratic
Elected U.S. Representative
James J. Howard
Democratic

Incumbent Democrat James J. Howard won.

This district included parts of Monmouth and Ocean counties.

=== Democratic primary ===
==== Candidates ====
- James J. Howard, incumbent Representative since 1965

==== Results ====
1978 Democratic primary
Party	Candidate	Votes	%
Democratic	James J. Howard (incumbent)	19,773	100.00%
Total votes		19,773	100.00%

=== Republican primary ===
==== Candidates ====
- Bruce G. Coe, executive director of the New Jersey Commission on Capital Budgeting and Planning

==== Results ====
1978 Republican primary
Party	Candidate	Votes	%
Republican	Bruce G. Coe	17,059	100.00%
Total votes		17,059	100.00%

=== General election ===
==== Candidates ====
- James J. Howard, incumbent Representative since 1965 (Democratic)
- Bruce G. Coe, executive director of the New Jersey Commission on Capital Budgeting and Planning (Republican)
- Stevenson M. Enterline, former Republican member of the Matawan borough council (Libertarian)

==== Results ====
1978 U.S. House election
Party	Candidate	Votes	%	±%
Democratic	James J. Howard (incumbent)	83,349	55.96%	
Republican	Bruce G. Coe	64,730	43.46%	
Libertarian	Stevenson Enterline	876	0.59%	
Total votes		148,955	100.00%	
Democratic hold		Swing	{{{swing}}}	

== District 4 ==
1978 New Jersey's 4th congressional district election
- November 7, 1978
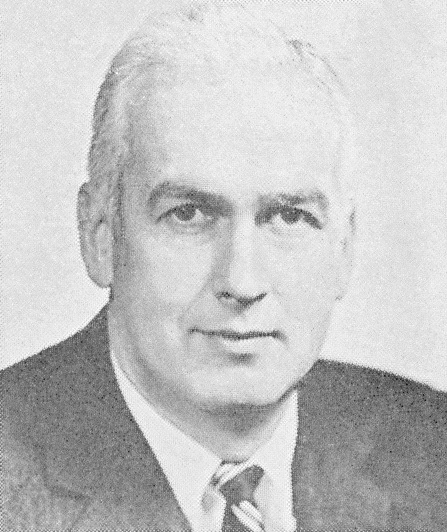

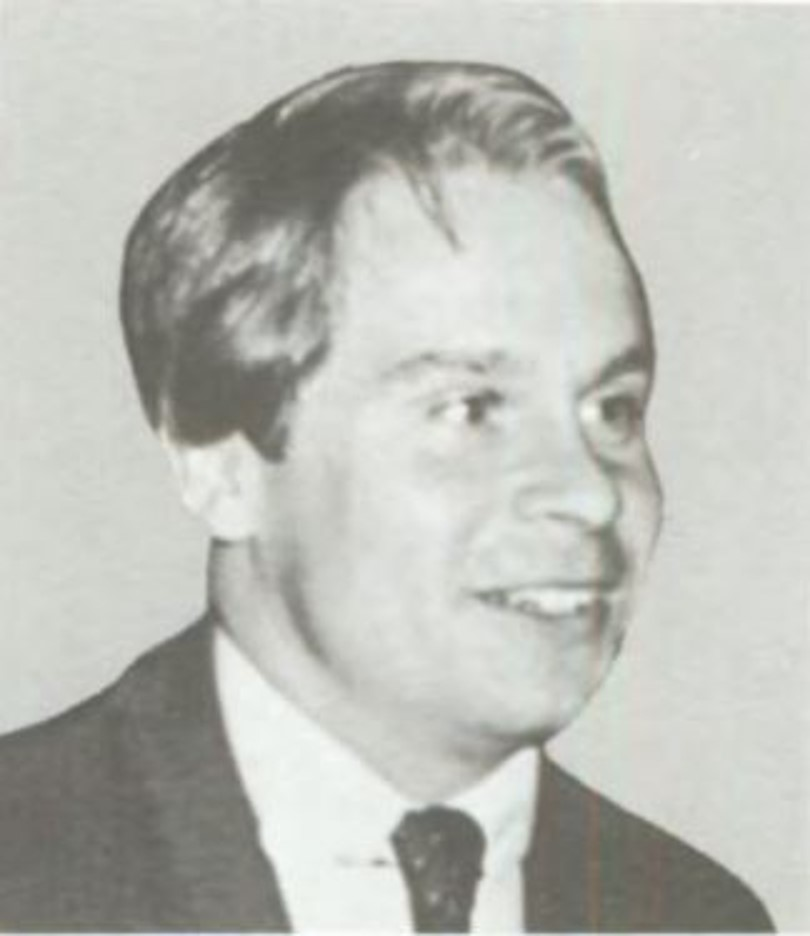
Nominee	Frank Thompson	Chris Smith
Party	Democratic	Republican
Popular vote	69,259	41,833
Percentage	61.1%	36.9%
U.S. Representative before election
Frank Thompson
Democratic
Elected U.S. Representative
Frank Thompson
Democratic

Incumbent Democrat Frank Thompson won. This district, in Central Jersey, consisted of parts of Burlington, Mercer, Middlesex, and Monmouth counties.

=== Democratic primary ===
==== Candidates ====
- Frank Thompson, incumbent Representative since 1955

==== Results ====
1978 Democratic primary
Party	Candidate	Votes	%
Democratic	Frank Thompson (incumbent)	17,278	100.00%
Total votes		17,278	100.00%

=== Republican primary ===
==== Candidates ====
- Chris Smith, chair of the New Jersey Right to Life Committee

==== Results ====
1978 Republican primary
Party	Candidate	Votes	%
Republican	Chris Smith	6,549	100.00%
Total votes		6,549	100.00%

=== General election ===
==== Candidates ====
- Judson Carter Sr. (Independent)
- John Val Jean Mahalchik, populist gadfly and perennial candidate (Betsy Ross)
- Paul B. Rizzo (Independent)
- Chris Smith, chair of the New Jersey Right to Life Committee (Republican)
- Frank Thompson, incumbent Representative since 1955 (Democratic)

===== Withdrew =====
- Jack Moyers (Libertarian) (ran for U.S. Senate)

==== Results ====
1978 U.S. House election
Party	Candidate	Votes	%	±%
Democratic	Frank Thompson (incumbent)	69,259	61.08%	
Republican	Chris Smith	41,833	36.90%	
Independent	John V. Mahalchik	1,145	1.01%	
Independent	Paul B. Rizzo	827	0.73%	
Independent	Judson Carter Sr.	318	0.28%	
Total votes		113,382	100.00%	
Democratic hold		Swing	{{{swing}}}	

== District 5 ==
1978 New Jersey's 5th congressional district election
- November 7, 1978
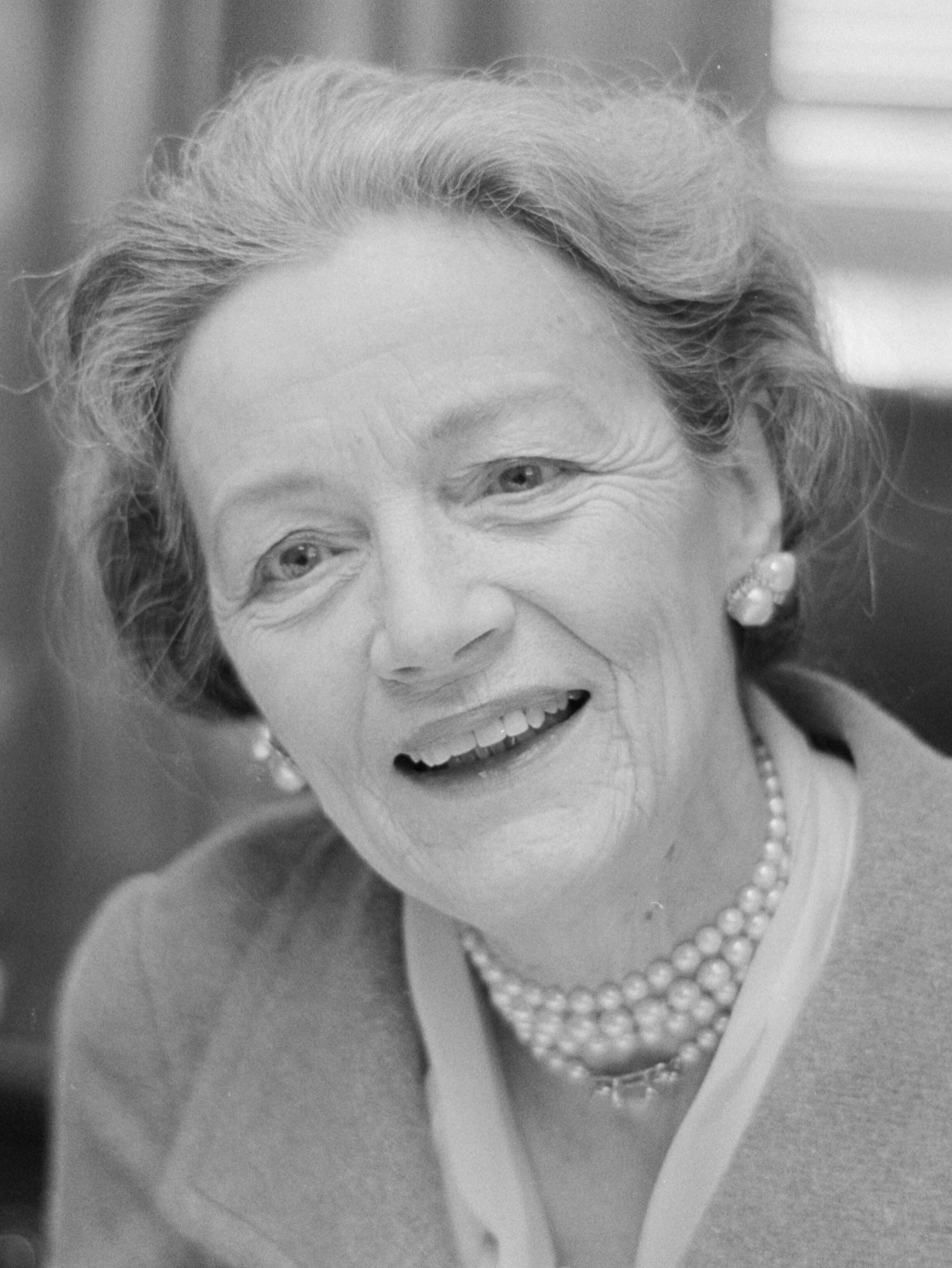

Nominee	Millicent Fenwick	John T. Fahy
Party	Republican	Democratic
Popular vote	100,739	38,108
Percentage	72.6%	27.4%
U.S. Representative before election
Millicent Fenwick
Republican
Elected U.S. Representative
Millicent Fenwick
Republican

Incumbent Millicent Fenwick won. This district included Somerset County and parts of Essex, Mercer, Middlesex, and Morris counties.

=== Republican primary ===
==== Candidates ====
- Millicent Fenwick, incumbent Representative since 1975

==== Results ====
1978 Republican primary
Party	Candidate	Votes	%
Republican	Millicent Fenwick (incumbent)	11,775	100.00%
Total votes		11,775	100.00%

=== Democratic primary ===
==== Candidates ====
- John T. Fahy, mayor of Parsippany

==== Results ====
1978 Democratic primary
Party	Candidate	Votes	%
Democratic	John T. Fahy	3,290	100.00%
Total votes		3,290	100.00%

=== General election ===
==== Candidates ====
- John T. Fahy, mayor of Parsippany (Democratic)
- Millicent Fenwick, incumbent Representative since 1975 (Republican)

==== Results ====
1978 U.S. House election
Party	Candidate	Votes	%	±%
Republican	Millicent Fenwick (incumbent)	100,739	72.55%	
Democratic	John T. Fahy	38,108	27.45%	
Total votes		201,299	100.00%	
Republican hold		Swing	{{{swing}}}	

== District 6 ==
1978 New Jersey's 6th congressional district election
- November 7, 1978
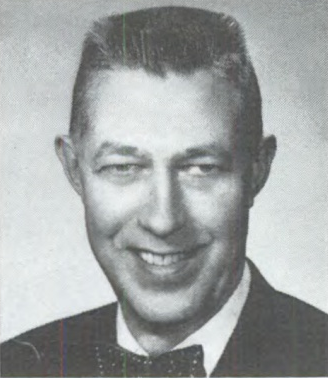

Nominee	Edwin B. Forsythe	W. Thomas McGann
Party	Republican	Democratic
Popular vote	89,446	56,874
Percentage	60.4%	38.4%
U.S. Representative before election
Edwin B. Forsythe
Republican
Elected U.S. Representative
Edwin B. Forsythe
Republican

Incumbent Republican Edwin B. Forsythe won.

This district included parts of Burlington, Camden, and Ocean counties.

=== Republican primary ===
==== Candidates ====
- Richard D. Amber, Mount Holly resident
- Edwin B. Forsythe, incumbent Representative from Moorestown since 1970

==== Results ====
1978 Republican primary
Party	Candidate	Votes	%
Republican	Edwin B. Forsythe (incumbent)	17,106	84.68%
Republican	Richard D. Amber	3,095	15.32%
Total votes		20,201	100.00%

=== Democratic primary ===
==== Candidates ====
- Joseph Carroll
- W. Thomas McGann, former Superior Court judge

==== Results ====
1978 Democratic primary
Party	Candidate	Votes	%
Democratic	W. Thomas McGann	9,465	52.15%
Democratic	Joseph Carroll	8,684	48.85%
Total votes		18,149	100.00%

=== General election ===
==== Candidates ====
- Bernardo S. Doganiero, perennial candidate (Socialist Labor)
- Edwin B. Forsythe, incumbent Representative from Moorestown since 1970 (Republican)
- W. Thomas McGann, former Superior Court judge (Democratic)
- Hazel McGlory, Burlington Township widow and prisoner (Betsy Ross)
- Charles M. Pike Jr. (Libertarian)

==== Results ====
1978 U.S. House election
Party	Candidate	Votes	%	±%
Republican	Edwin B. Forsythe (incumbent)	89,446	60.36%	
Democratic	W. Thomas McGann	56,874	38.38%	
Socialist Labor	Bernardo S. Doganiero	737	0.50%	
Libertarian	Charles M. Pike Jr.	643	0.43%	
Independent	Hazel McGlory	484	0.33%	
Total votes		148,184	100.00%	
Republican hold		Swing	{{{swing}}}	

== District 7 ==
1978 New Jersey's 7th congressional district election
- November 7, 1978
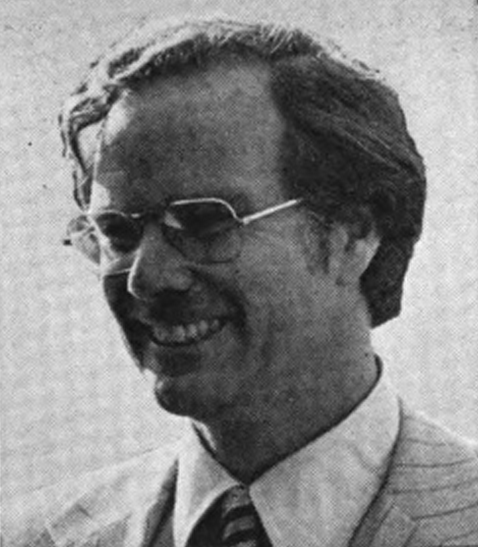

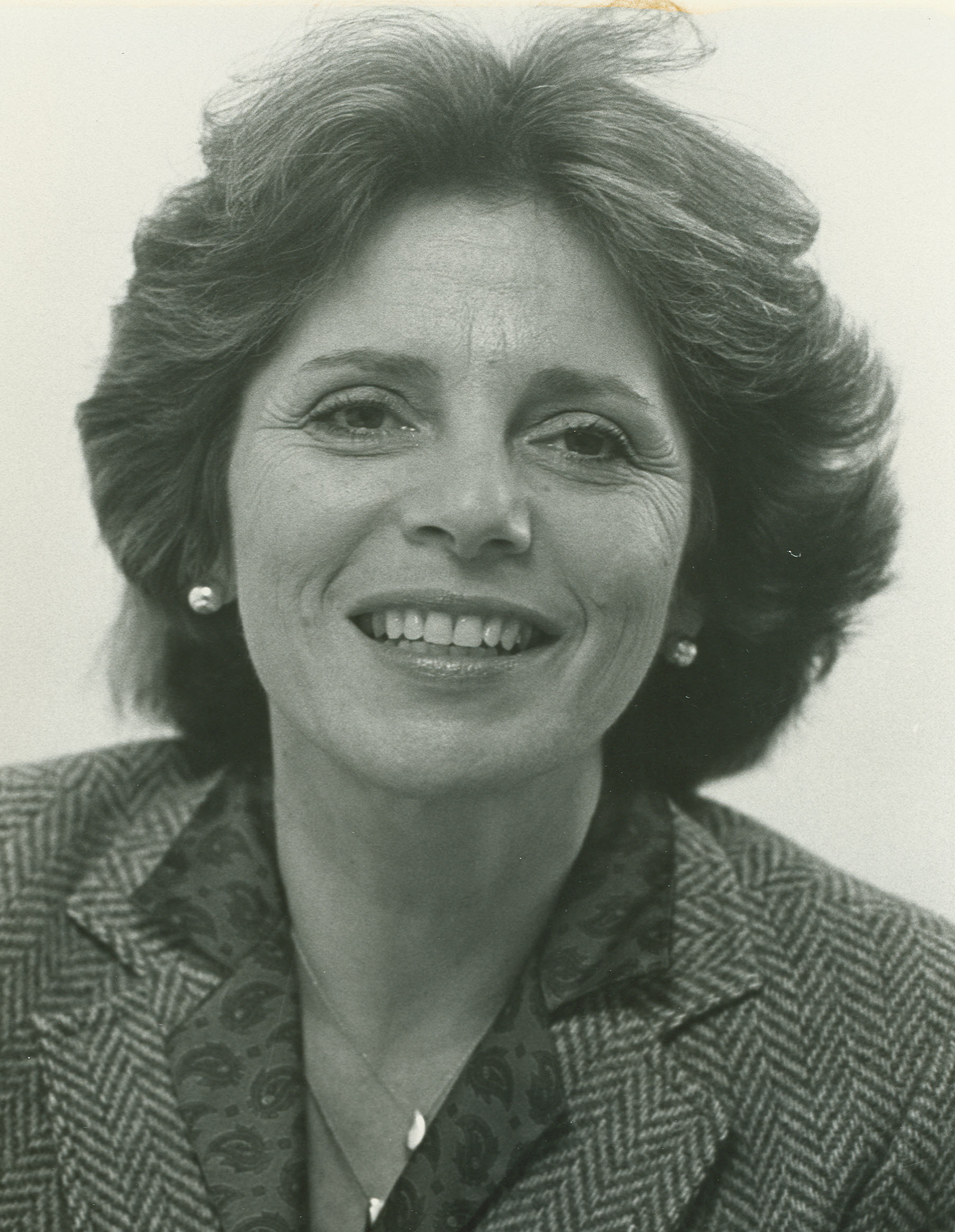
Nominee	Andrew Maguire	Marge Roukema
Party	Democratic	Republican
Popular vote	78,358	69,543
Percentage	52.5%	46.6%
U.S. Representative before election
Andrew Maguire
Democratic
Elected U.S. Representative
Andrew Maguire
Democratic

Incumbent Andrew Maguire was re-elected to a third term in office. This district included western parts of Bergen County.

=== Democratic primary ===
==== Candidates ====
- Andrew Maguire, incumbent Representative since 1975

==== Results ====
1978 Democratic primary
Party	Candidate	Votes	%
Democratic	Andrew Maguire (incumbent)	16,321	100.00%
Total votes		16,321	100.00%

=== Republican primary ===
==== Candidates ====
- Marge Roukema, former member of the Ridgewood board of education
- Gerald L. Williams, Mahwah businessman and member of the John Birch Society
- Joseph C. Woodcock, former state senator and candidate for governor in 1977

===== Declined =====
- James J. Sheehan, member of the Wyckoff township committee and nominee for this district in 1976

==== Results ====
1978 Republican primary
Party	Candidate	Votes	%
Republican	Marge Roukema	8,346	39.30%
Republican	Joseph C. Woodcock	6,712	31.61%
Republican	Gerald Williams	6,176	29.09%
Total votes		21,234	100.00%

=== General election ===
==== Candidates ====
- Elliot Greenspan (Labor)
- Andrew Maguire, incumbent Representative since 1975 (Democratic)
- Marge Roukema, former member of the Ridgewood Board of Education (Republican)
- Robert Shapiro, chair of the Bergen County Libertarian Party (Libertarian)

==== Results ====
1978 U.S. House election
Party	Candidate	Votes	%	±%
Democratic	Andrew Maguire (incumbent)	78,358	52.55%	
Republican	Marge Roukema	69,543	46.64%	
Libertarian	Robert Shapiro	974	0.65%	
U.S. Labor	Elliot Greenspan	243	0.16%	
Total votes		149,118	100.00%	
Democratic hold		Swing	{{{swing}}}	

== District 8 ==
1978 New Jersey's 8th congressional district election
- November 7, 1978
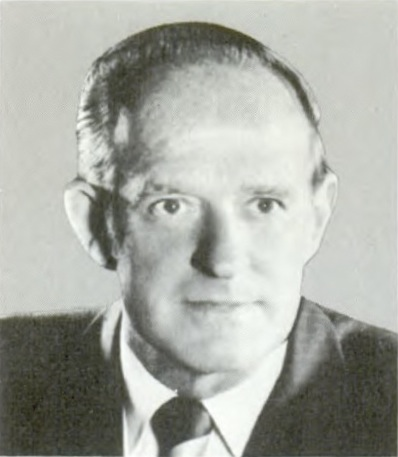

Nominee	Robert A. Roe	Thomas Melani
Party	Democratic	Republican
Popular vote	69,496	23,842
Percentage	74.5%	25.5%
U.S. Representative before election
Robert A. Roe
Democratic
Elected U.S. Representative
Robert A. Roe
Democratic

Incumbent Robert Roe won. This district included parts of Bergen and Passaic counties.

=== Democratic primary ===
==== Candidates ====
- Robert A. Roe, incumbent Representative from Wayne since 1969

==== Results ====
1978 Democratic primary
Party	Candidate	Votes	%
Democratic	Robert A. Roe (incumbent)	10,688	100.00%
Total votes		10,688	100.00%

=== Republican primary ===
==== Candidates ====
- Thomas Melani, Wayne attorney

==== Results ====
1978 Republican primary
Party	Candidate	Votes	%
Republican	Thomas Melani	6,465	100.00%
Total votes		6,465	100.00%

=== General election ===
==== Candidates ====
- Thomas Melani, Wayne attorney (Republican)
- Robert A. Roe, incumbent Representative from Wayne since 1969 (Democratic)

==== Results ====
1978 U.S. House election
Party	Candidate	Votes	%	±%
Democratic	Robert A. Roe (incumbent)	69,496	74.46%	
Republican	Thomas Melani	23,842	25.54%	
Total votes		93,338	100.00%	
Democratic hold		Swing	{{{swing}}}	

== District 9 ==
1978 New Jersey's 9th congressional district election
- November 7, 1978
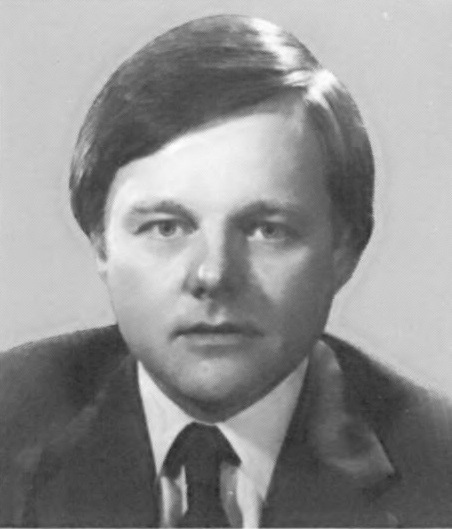

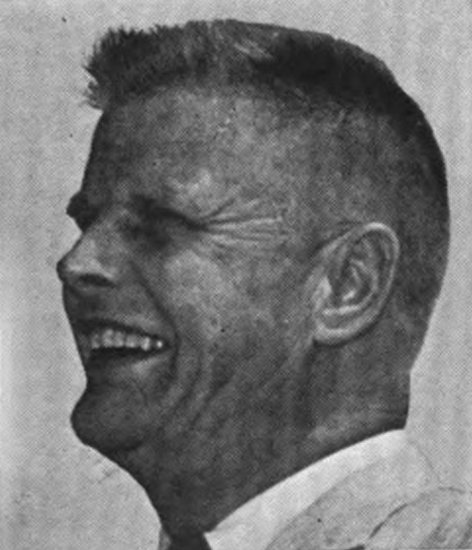
Nominee	Harold C. Hollenbeck	Nicholas S. Mastorelli	Henry Helstoski
Party	Republican	Democratic	Independent Democratic
Popular vote	73,478	56,888	19,126
Percentage	48.9%	37.9%	12.7%
U.S. Representative before election
Harold C. Hollenbeck
Republican
Elected U.S. Representative
Harold C. Hollenbeck
Republican

This district consisted of parts of Bergen and Hudson counties.

Incumbent Republican Harold C. Hollenbeck won.

=== Republican primary ===
==== Candidates ====
- Harold Hollenbeck, incumbent Representative from East Rutherford since 1977
- Hugh A. Wagner, Alpine resident

==== Results ====
1978 Republican primary
Party	Candidate	Votes	%
Republican	Harold C. Hollenbeck (incumbent)	10,083	81.79%
Republican	Hugh A. Wagner	2,245	18.21%
Total votes		12,328	100.00%

=== Democratic primary ===
==== Candidates ====
- Albert Burstein, assemblyman from Teaneck
- Mike Jousan Jr., Leonia reverend
- Nicholas Mastorelli, executive director of the North Hudson Council of Mayors

===== Declined =====
- Byron Baer, assemblyman from Englewood and candidate for this district in 1976
- Anthony Scardino, state senator from Lyndhurst

==== Results ====
1978 Democratic primary
Party	Candidate	Votes	%
Democratic	Nicholas Mastorelli	16,448	51.24%
Democratic	Albert Burstein	13,694	42.66%
Democratic	Mike Jousan	1,958	6.10%
Total votes		32,100	100.00%

=== General election ===
==== Candidates ====
- Henry Helstoski, former Representative for this district (Independent)
- Harold Hollenbeck, incumbent Representative from East Rutherford since 1977 (Republican)
- Nicholas S. Mastorelli, executive director of the North Hudson Council of Mayors (Democratic)
- Bruce Todd (Labor)

==== Results ====
1978 U.S. House election
Party	Candidate	Votes	%	±%
Republican	Harold C. Hollenbeck (inc.)	73,478	48.93%	
Democratic	Nicholas Mastorelli	56,888	37.89%	
Independent	Henry Helstoski	19,126	12.74%	
U.S. Labor	Bruce Todd	663	0.44%	
Total votes		150,155	100.00%	
Republican hold		Swing	{{{swing}}}	

== District 10 ==
1978 New Jersey's 10th congressional district election
- November 7, 1978
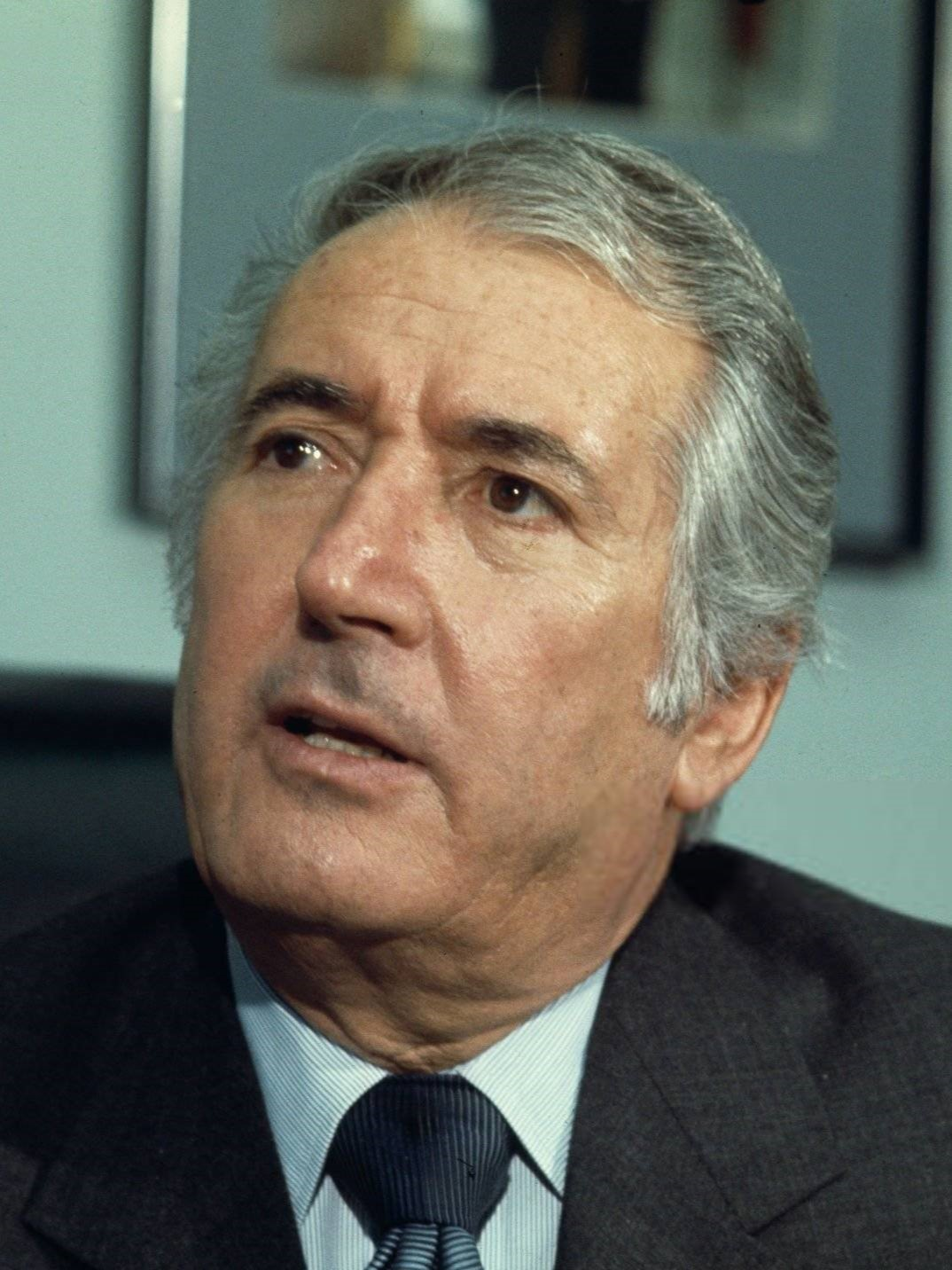

Nominee	Peter W. Rodino	John L. Pelt
Party	Democratic	Republican
Popular vote	55,074	8,066
Percentage	86.4%	12.6%
U.S. Representative before election
Peter W. Rodino
Democratic
Elected U.S. Representative
Peter W. Rodino
Democratic

The district included parts of Essex and Hudson counties. Incumbent Democrat Peter W. Rodino won.

=== Democratic primary ===
==== Candidates ====
- Peter W. Rodino, incumbent Representative since 1949

==== Results ====
1978 Democratic primary
Party	Candidate	Votes	%
Democratic	Peter W. Rodino (incumbent)	15,074	100.00%
Total votes		15,074	100.00%

=== Republican primary ===
==== Candidates ====
- John L. Pelt, Newark car salesman

===== Declined =====
- Tony Grandison, former Newark Housing Authority supervisor and nominee for this district in 1976

==== Results ====
1978 Republican primary
Party	Candidate	Votes	%
Republican	John L. Pelt	2,699	100.00%
Total votes		2,699	100.00%

=== General election ===
==== Candidates ====
- Tony Austin (Socialist Workers)
- Gordon A. Douglas (Labor)
- John L. Pelt, Newark car salesman (Republican)
- Peter W. Rodino, incumbent Representative since 1949 (Democratic)

==== Results ====
1978 U.S. House election
Party	Candidate	Votes	%	±%
Democratic	Peter W. Rodino (inc.)	55,074	86.35%	
Republican	John L. Pelt	8,066	12.65%	
Socialist Workers	Tony Austin	219	0.54%	
U.S. Labor	Gordon A. Douglas	290	0.45%	
Total votes		63,777	100.00%	
Democratic hold		Swing	{{{swing}}}	

== District 11 ==
1978 New Jersey's 11th congressional district election
- November 7, 1978
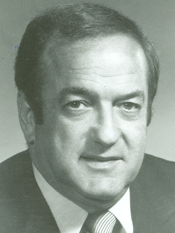

Nominee	Joseph Minish	Julius Feld
Party	Democratic	Republican
Popular vote	88,294	35,642
Percentage	63.0%	34.3%
U.S. Representative before election
Joseph Minish
Democratic
Elected U.S. Representative
Joseph Minish
Democratic

Incumbent Democrat Joseph Minish won. This district consisted of parts of Bergen, Essex, Passaic, and Union counties.

=== Democratic primary ===
==== Candidates ====
- Jack Horn, Nutley accountant
- Joseph Minish, incumbent Representative from West Orange since 1963

==== Results ====
1978 Democratic primary
Party	Candidate	Votes	%
Democratic	Joseph Minish (incumbent)	19,281	91.85%
Democratic	Jack Horn	1,710	8.15%
Total votes		20,991	100.00%

=== Republican primary ===
==== Candidates ====
- Julius George Feld, South Orange resident

==== Results ====
1978 Republican primary
Party	Candidate	Votes	%
Republican	Julius George Feld	12,163	100.00%
Total votes		12,163	100.00%

=== General election ===
==== Candidates ====
- Julius George Feld, South Orange resident (Republican)
- Joseph Minish, incumbent Representative from West Orange since 1963 (Democratic)
- Richard S. Roth (Libertarian)

==== Resultsd ====
1978 U.S. House election
Party	Candidate	Votes	%	±%
Democratic	Joseph Minish (incumbent)	88,294	70.54%	
Republican	Julius George Feld	35,642	28.47%	
Libertarian	Richard S. Roth	1,238	0.99%	
Total votes		125,174	100.00%	
Democratic hold		Swing	{{{swing}}}	

== District 12 ==
1978 New Jersey's 12th congressional district election
- November 7, 1978
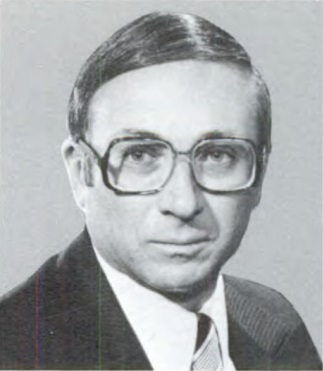

Nominee	Matt Rinaldo	Richard McCormack
Party	Republican	Democratic
Popular vote	94,850	34,423
Percentage	73.4%	26.6%
U.S. Representative before election
Matt Rinaldo
Republican
Elected U.S. Representative
Matt Rinaldo
Republican

Incumbent Matt Rinaldo won. This district included parts of Union County.

=== Republican primary ===
==== Candidates ====
- Matt Rinaldo, incumbent Representative from Union since 1973

==== Results ====
1978 Republican primary
Party	Candidate	Votes	%
Republican	Matt Rinaldo (incumbent)	14,893	100.00%
Total votes		14,893	100.00%

=== Democratic primary ===
==== Candidates ====
- Richard McCormack, member of the Kenilworth borough council

==== Results ====
1978 Democratic primary
Party	Candidate	Votes	%
Democratic	Richard McCormack	10,033	100.00%
Total votes		10,033	100.00%

=== General election ===
==== Candidates ====
- Richard McCormack, member of the Kenilworth borough council (Democratic)
- Matt Rinaldo, incumbent Representative from Union since 1973 (Republican)

==== Results ====
1978 U.S. House election
Party	Candidate	Votes	%	±%
Republican	Matt Rinaldo (incumbent)	94,850	73.37%	
Democratic	Richard McCormack	34,423	26.63%	
Total votes		129,273	100.00%	
Republican hold		Swing	{{{swing}}}	

== District 13 ==
1978 New Jersey's 13th congressional district election
- November 7, 1978
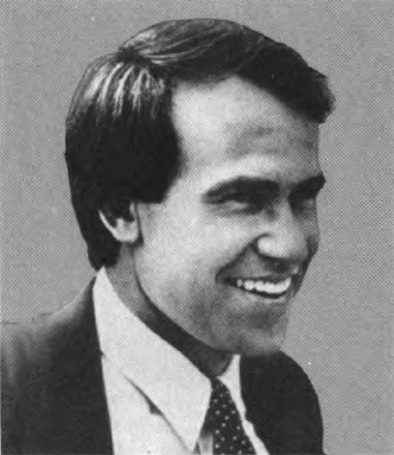

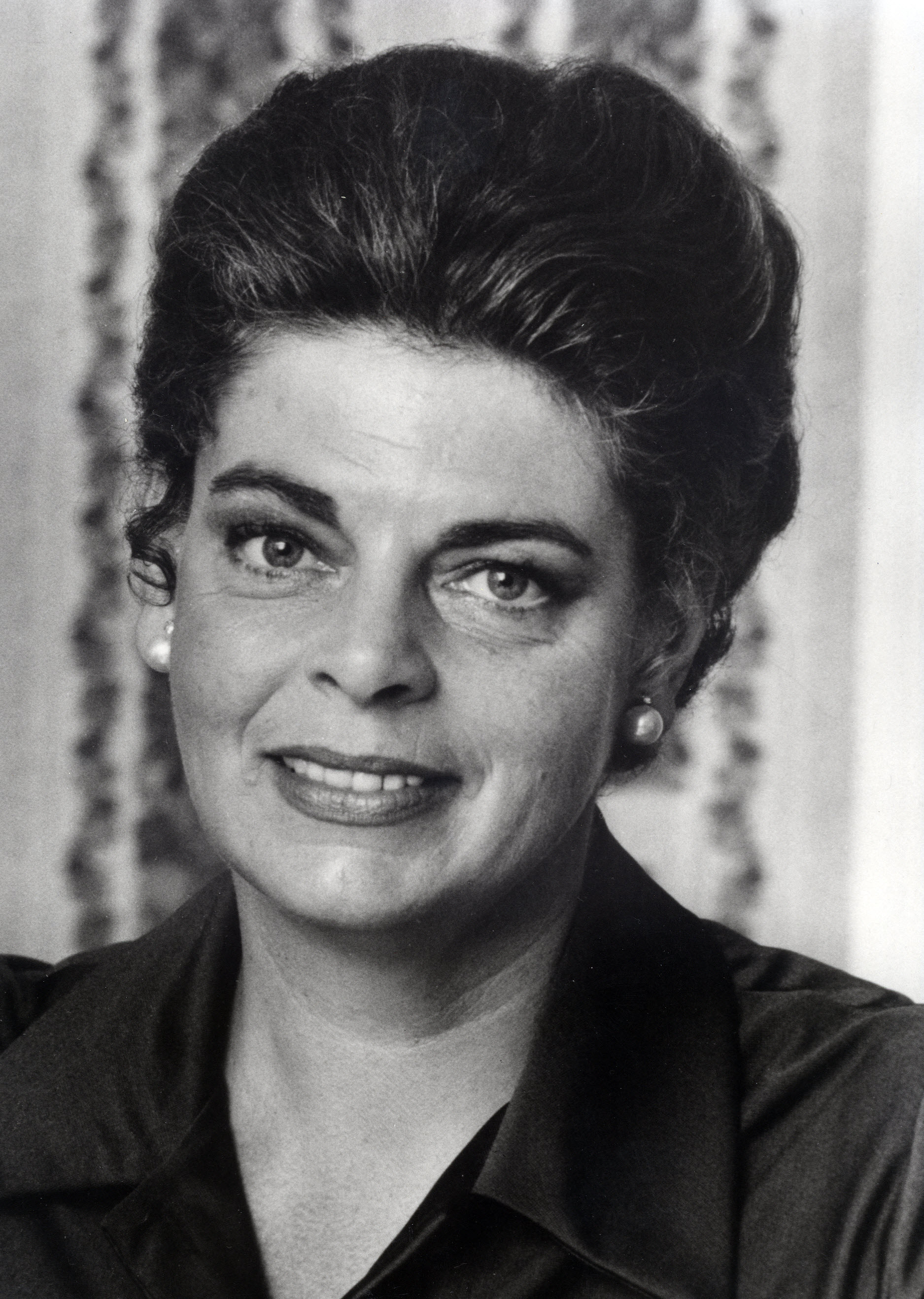
Nominee	Jim Courter	Helen Stevenson Meyner
Party	Republican	Democratic
Popular vote	77,301	71,808
Percentage	51.8%	48.2%
U.S. Representative before election
Helen Stevenson Meyner
Democratic
Elected U.S. Representative
Jim Courter
Republican

This sprawling district included Hunterdon, Sussex, and Warren counties and parts of Mercer and Morris counties.

Incumbent Representative Helen Stevenson Meyner ran for re-election to a third term in office but was defeated by Jim Courter.

=== Democratic primary ===
==== Candidates ====
- Helen Stevenson Meyner, incumbent Representative since 1975 and former First Lady of New Jersey

==== Results ====
1978 Democratic primary
Party	Candidate	Votes	%
Democratic	Helen S. Meyner (incumbent)	16,066	40.03%
Total votes		16,066	100.00%

=== Republican primary ===
==== Candidates ====
- Frank Bell, East Hanover engineer
- Jim Courter, Warren County assistant prosecutor
- William E. Schluter, former state senator from Pennington and nominee for this district in 1976
- Joseph F. Warganz, former chair of the New Jersey Right to Life Committee
- Ronald Williams

===== Withdrew =====
- Dick Zimmer, attorney, adviser to assemblyman Thomas Kean, and former chair of New Jersey common cause

==== Results ====
1978 Republican primary
Party	Candidate	Votes	%
Republican	Jim Courter	10,541	38.31%
Republican	William E. Schluter	10,407	37.82%
Republican	Frank Bell	3,190	11.59%
Republican	Joseph F. Warganz	1,982	7.20%
Republican	Ronald Williams	1,397	5.08%
Total votes		27,517	100.00%

=== General election ===
==== Candidates ====
- Jim Courter, Warren County assistant prosecutor (Republican)
- Helen Stevenson Meyner, incumbent Representative since 1975 and former First Lady of New Jersey (Democratic)

==== Withdrew ====
- Dale Sutthoff, vice-chair of the New Jersey Libertarian Party (Libertarian)

==== Results ====
1978 U.S. House election
Party	Candidate	Votes	%	±%
Republican	Jim Courter	77,301	51.84%	
Democratic	Helen Stevenson Meyner (inc.)	71,808	48.16%	
Total votes		149,109	100.00%	
Republican gain from Democratic		Swing	{{{swing}}}	

== District 14 ==
1978 New Jersey's 14th congressional district election
- November 7, 1978
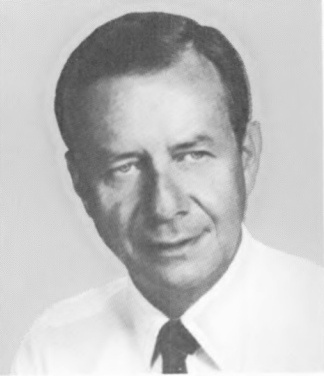

Nominee	Frank Guarini	Henry J. Hill	Thomas McDonough
Party	Democratic	Republican	Independent
Popular vote	67,008	21,355	15,015
Percentage	63.6%	20.3%	14.3%
U.S. Representative before election
Joseph A. LeFante
Democratic
Elected U.S. Representative
Frank J. Guarini
Democratic

This district included parts of Hudson County.

Incumbent representative Joseph A. LeFante did not run for re-election to a second term. Frank J. Guarini was elected to the open seat.

=== Democratic primary ===
==== Candidates ====
- Raymond J. Connelly
- Frank J. Guarini, incumbent Representative since 1979
- Anthony P. Scalcione

==== Declined ====
- Joseph A. LeFante, incumbent Representative since 1977

==== Results ====
1978 Democratic primary
Party	Candidate	Votes	%
Democratic	Frank J. Guarini	34,127	82.32%
Democratic	Anthony P. Scalcione	4,163	10.04%
Democratic	Raymond J. Connelly	3,165	7.63%
Total votes		41,455	100.00%

=== Republican primary ===
==== Candidates ====
- Henry J. Hill, member of the Kearny city council

==== Results ====
1978 Republican primary
Party	Candidate	Votes	%
Republican	Henry J. Hill	2,945	100.00%
Total votes		2,945	100.00%

=== General election ===
==== Candidates ====
- Frank J. Guarini, incumbent Representative since 1979 (Democratic)
- Henry J. Hill, member of the Kearny city council (Republican)
- Thomas E. McDonough (Independent)
- John E. Walton (Independent)

==== Results ====
1978 U.S. House election
Party	Candidate	Votes	%	±%
Democratic	Frank J. Guarini	67,008	63.61%	
Republican	Henry J. Hill	21,355	20.27%	
Independent	Thomas E. McDonough	15,015	14.25%	
Independent	John E. Walton	1,962	1.86%	
Total votes		105,340	100.00%	
Democratic hold		Swing	{{{swing}}}	

== District 15 ==
1978 New Jersey's 15th congressional district election
- November 7, 1978
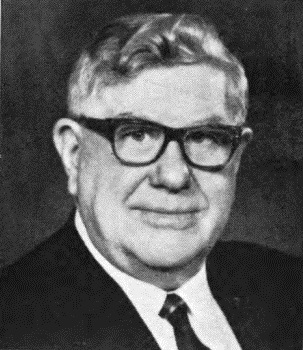

Nominee	Edward J. Patten	Charles W. Wiley
Party	Democratic	Republican
Popular vote	55,944	53,108
Percentage	48.3%	45.8%
U.S. Representative before election
Edward J. Patten
Democratic
Elected U.S. Representative
Edward J. Patten
Democratic

This district included parts of Middlesex and Union counties. Incumbent Democrat Edward J. Patten was re-elected to a ninth term in office, though he faced strong challenges in both the Democratic primary and general election over his ties to the Koreagate scandal.

=== Democratic primary ===
==== Candidates ====
- Edward J. Patten, incumbent Representative since 1963
- George A. Spadoro, Edison attorney

==== Results ====
1978 Democratic primary
Party	Candidate	Votes	%
Democratic	Edward J. Patten (inc.)	20,738	58.84%
Democratic	George A. Spadoro	14,506	41.16%
Total votes		35,244	100.00%

=== Republican primary ===
==== Candidates ====
- Charles W. Wiley, freelance journalist

==== Results ====
1978 Republican primary
Party	Candidate	Votes	%
Republican	Charles W. Wiley	4,720	100.00%
Total votes		4,720	100.00%

=== General election ===
==== Candidates ====
- Ann V. Bastian (Peoples Independent Coalition)
- Michael Fieschko, member of the Libertarian National Committee and candidate for General Assembly in 1977 (Libertarian)
- Edward J. Patten, incumbent Representative since 1963 (Democratic)
- Charles W. Wiley, freelance journalist (Republican)

==== Results ====
1978 U.S. House election
Party	Candidate	Votes	%	±%
Democratic	Edward J. Patten	55,944	48.28%	
Republican	Charles W. Wiley	53,108	45.83%	
Independent	Ann V. Bastian	5,396	4.66%	
Libertarian	Michael Fieschko	1,438	1.24%	
Total votes		115,886	100.00%	
Democratic hold		Swing	{{{swing}}}	
