= William B. Widnall =

American politician (1906–1983)

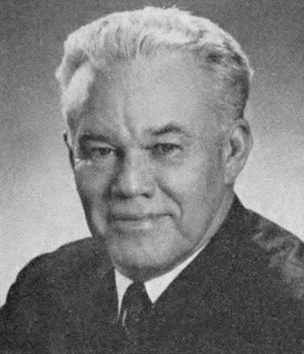

Member of the U.S. House of Representatives from New Jersey's 7th district
- In office February 6, 1950 – December 31, 1974
- Preceded by: J. Parnell Thomas
- Succeeded by: Andrew Maguire

Personal details
- Born: March 17, 1906 Hackensack, New Jersey, US
- Died: December 28, 1983 (aged 77) Ridgewood, New Jersey, US
- Party: Republican

William Beck Widnall (March 17, 1906 – December 28, 1983) was a Republican Party politician who served as a member of the United States House of Representatives for 24 years representing New Jersey's 7th congressional district.

Born in Hackensack, New Jersey, Widnall attended public schools, graduating from Hackensack High School in 1922. He graduated from Brown University in 1926 with a Ph.B. degree and went on to receive a law degree from the New Jersey Law School (now Rutgers School of Law–Newark) in 1931.

Widnall then practiced law in Hackensack and served in the New Jersey General Assembly from 1946 to 1950. He was elected to Congress on February 6, 1950, in a special election to fill the vacancy caused by the resignation of J. Parnell Thomas, who had been convicted and sentenced to federal prison for corruption. He opposed building the Kennedy Center in its current location as being too difficult to reach and not attached to the larger Metro system. Widnall served until his own resignation from Congress on December 31, 1974, following his failed reelection bid in 1974. Widnall voted in favor of the Civil Rights Acts of 1957, 1960, 1964, and 1968, and the Voting Rights Act of 1965.

After leaving Congress, Widnall served as chairman of the National Commission on Electronic Fund Transfers from November 1975 to 1981.

A longtime resident of Saddle River, New Jersey, Widnall died at a nursing home in Ridgewood, New Jersey, on December 28, 1983, at the age of 77 due to atherosclerosis and Parkinson's disease.

U.S. House of Representatives
Preceded by J. Parnell Thomas	Member of the U.S. House of Representatives from New Jersey's 7th congressional district 1950–1974	Succeeded by Andrew Maguire
Preceded by Clarence E. Kilburn	Ranking Member of the House Banking and Currency Committee; 1965–1974	Succeeded by Albert W. Johnson
