= Millicent Fenwick =

American politician (1910–1992)

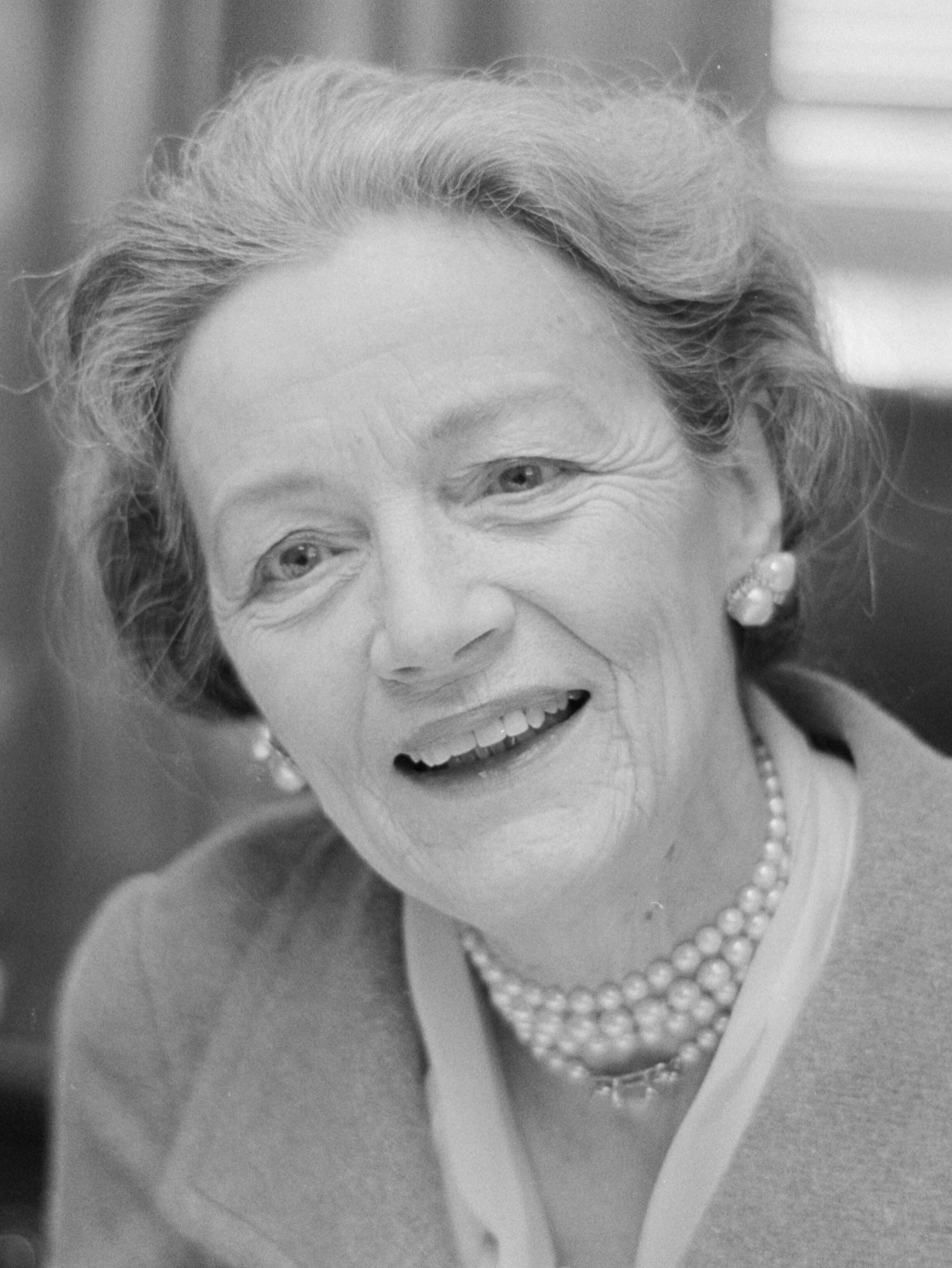
- Fenwick c. 1975

United States Ambassador to the United Nations Agencies for Food and Agriculture
- In office June 13, 1983 – March 20, 1987
- President: Ronald Reagan
- Preceded by: Position established
- Succeeded by: Fred Eckert

Member of the U.S. House of Representatives from New Jersey's 5th district
- In office January 3, 1975 – January 3, 1983
- Preceded by: Peter Frelinghuysen
- Succeeded by: Jim Courter (redistricted)

Member of the New Jersey General Assembly from the 8th district
- In office January 13, 1970 – December 14, 1972
- Preceded by: Webster B. Todd Jr.
- Succeeded by: Victor A. Rizzolo

Personal details
- Born: Millicent Vernon Hammond; February 25, 1910 New York City, New York, U.S.
- Died: September 16, 1992 (aged 82) Bernardsville, New Jersey, U.S.
- Party: Republican
- Spouse: Hugh Fenwick (m. 1932; div. 1945)
- Children: 2
- Parent(s): Ogden H. Hammond; Mary Picton Stevens
- Relatives: See Stevens family
- Education: Columbia University (attended); New School (attended)

Millicent Vernon Fenwick (née Hammond; February 25, 1910 – September 16, 1992) was an American fashion model, Vogue magazine editor, socialite, Republican Party politician, and diplomat who represented New Jersey in the United States House of Representatives from 1975 to 1983. She also served in the New Jersey General Assembly from 1970 to 1972 and as the first United States Ambassador to the United Nations Agencies for Food and Agriculture from 1983 to 1987. She was famous for her energy and colorful enthusiasm and regarded as a political moderate or progressive within her party. She was outspoken in favor of civil rights and the women's movement.

== Early life and education ==
Millicent Vernon Hammond was born in New York City on February 25, 1910 to Ogden H. Hammond (1869–1956) and his first wife, Mary Picton Stevens (1885–1915). Her father was a graduate of Yale University, an insurance and real estate broker, and local Republican Party politician in Bernardsville, New Jersey. He had been born to a prominent family in Louisville, Kentucky, and his father John Henry Hammond had served as chief of staff to William Tecumseh Sherman during the Vicksburg campaign. Her mother, Mary, was the heiress to a prominent Hoboken, New Jersey family and a great-granddaughter of Edwin Augustus Stevens, who had founded Stevens Institute of Technology. Millicent was the second of three children, with siblings Mary Stevens Hammond and Ogden Jr., and they were raised in a Bernardsville mansion with 50 rooms.

In 1915, Ogden and Mary Hammond travelled to Europe to aid in the Allied effort during World War I as passengers on the British ocean liner RMS Lusitania, which was sunk by German naval forces. Mary Hammond, who had planned to build a hospital in Paris, was killed, but Ogden survived. At the time, Millicent was five years old, and her father did not speak about her mother's death for the remainder of her life.

In 1917, he remarried to Marguerite McClure Howland. According to her biographer Amy Schapiro, Millicent had a poor relationship with her new stepmother, who was preoccupied with her social status and her own son from a previous marriage, and her father remained absent from his children's lives and upbringing. Instead, Millicent became close with her siblings, especially her sister Mary. In 1918, the Hammonds were awarded over $60,000 in a wrongful death suit against the Cunard Line.

=== Education ===
She attended the exclusive Nightingale-Bamford girls' school on the Upper East Side of Manhattan before she was sent to Foxcroft School, a private girls' boarding school in Middleburg, Virginia. However, she left Foxcroft in 1925, when her father was appointed United States ambassador to Spain, and she never received a high school diploma.

She also attended Barnard College of Columbia University and The New School for Social Research, where she studied philosophy under Bertrand Russell.

== Marriage and divorce ==
In 1929, Hammond met Hugh McLeod Fenwick (1905–1991), an aviation businessman from Far Hills. Fenwick was married at the time to Dorothy Ledyard, the daughter of prominent New York attorney Lewis Cass Ledyard. While Dorothy was summering in the Hamptons, they carried on an extramarital affair, which she later described as "seamy." Fenwick divorced from his wife soon after and proposed to Hammond. Both Millicent's stepmother, a devout Catholic, and her father disapproved of the marriage, and she was prohibited from returning to the family house. They were married on June 11, 1932 and rented a home in Bedminster, New Jersey for about a year before moving to Bernardsville.

They had two children, Mary Stevens Fenwick (born February 25, 1934) and Hugo Hammond Fenwick. The Fenwicks separated after the birth of Hugo, with Hugh relocating to Europe and leaving behind a great deal of debt. After several years of separation, they divorced in 1945. Keeping her husband's name, Millicent did not remarry and focused on working and caring for her children. When asked about her husband in 1982, Fenwick responded, "Wherever he is, I hope he's as charming as ever."

== Fashion career ==
Following her divorce and facing immense debt, it was difficult for Fenwick to find work to support herself and her children. She briefly modeled for Harper's Bazaar, but she had little by way of work experience and no diploma. Facing a precarious financial situation, Fenwick was forced to tear down her childhood mansion, with the exception of its library, to afford the costs of maintaining the remaining property. For the next thirty years, she lived in the two-story library, which was the size of an ordinary house.

She worked for Vogue magazine as a caption editor, remaining with the magazine until 1948, holding several other titles. She also compiled Vogue's Book of Etiquette, which sold a million copies and she eventually went on tour around the country.

By 1952, Fenwick retired from work, as her children were old enough to support themselves and she could derive a substantial income from her trust accounts, which consisted of her inheritance from her mother and her family's real estate.

== Political career ==
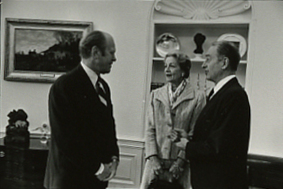
Fenwick with President Gerald Ford and Clifford P. Case in 1976

During the 1950s, Fenwick became involved in politics via the civil rights movement and volunteered for the NAACP, the Somerset County legal aid society, local political candidates, and a prison reform group.

She rose rapidly in the ranks of the New Jersey Republican Party. Fenwick was elected to the board of education and, in 1957, became the first woman elected to the Bernardsville borough council, serving until 1964. She also served on the New Jersey Committee of the United States Commission on Civil Rights, on which she served from 1958 to 1974.

=== New Jersey General Assembly (1970–72) and cabinet ===
In 1969, she was elected to the New Jersey General Assembly, serving from 1970 to 1972. During her service in the Assembly, Fenwick campaigned for better working conditions, including bathrooms, in migrant labor camps, earning her the nickname "Outhouse Millie." Fenwick was also known for her colorful wit in debate and the press. When a male colleague attacked a piece of women's rights legislation by arguing, "I've always thought women were meant to be kissable, cuddly, and sweet-smelling," Fenwick responded, "That's what I thought of men, and I hope for your sake that you haven't been disappointed as many times as I've been."

She resigned in December 1972 to become director of the New Jersey Division of Consumer Affairs in the cabinet of William T. Cahill. She served in that position until resigning to run for Congress in 1974.

=== U.S. House of Representatives (1975–83) ===
In 1974, Fenwick ran for the United States House of Representatives in New Jersey's 5th congressional district, one of the wealthiest in the United States, consisting of "horse-and-hunt" communities in Somerset and Morris counties. She faced assembly speaker and future governor Thomas Kean in the Republican primary and narrowly defeated him. She was re-elected to three terms in 1976, 1978, and 1980 with increasing margins against limited opposition. In 1980, she endorsed George Bush for president in the Republican Party primaries, though she later supported Ronald Reagan, stating after his inauguration, "I like Mr. Reagan. He works from the ground up, rather than the statistic down. That's been my approach."

In Washington, she was regarded as a political maverick who was conservative on fiscal policy and moderate or liberal on social issues. She was considered more conservative during her final term in Congress, during the presidency of Ronald Reagan. During her first three terms in office, the American Conservative Union gave her an average rating of 35 out of 100, while in 1981, her rating leapt to 73, largely based on her support for Reagan's economic policy. However, she retained an above-average 55 rating from the liberal Americans for Democratic Action for her votes against reductions in the Department of Health and Human Services budget and against military spending, including the MX missile system and B-1 bomber. She supported further cuts to agricultural and oil industry subsidies to preserve social and education spending, including Social Security. According to a 1982 New York Times profile, her constituents commonly described her as "a national treasure" and wrote her name in for President of the United States. Colleagues in the House described her in varying terms as "one of the great minds in Congress," "self-righteous," and "just plain flaky," while critics accused her of lacking substance or hypocrisy. Other colleagues criticized her for her aloofness from legislative deal-making, including voting against a higher-education bill that included earmarks for her district, and her opposition to congressional pay raises, which they said she could afford to oppose due to her personal wealth.

Her efforts against corruption and special interest groups, leading television newscaster Walter Cronkite to refer to her as "the conscience of Congress." She was also known for her opposition to "obscene campaign spending." In her final re-election campaign, she spent only $32,578 (similar to contemporary spending on local council races) in a commitment to limit spending.

Fenwick was also deeply involved in foreign affairs, including as a member of the House Committee on Foreign Affairs. In 1975, Fenwick travelled to Moscow as part of a congressional delegation following the signing of the Helsinki Accords. She met there with refuseniks and held an unofficial meeting with dissident Yuri Orlov. Before departing, Fenwick raised specific human rights concerns to Leonid Brezhnev at a press conference. Upon her return to the United States, Fenwick sought to improve human rights in the Soviet Union and wrote the legislation establishing the Commission on Security and Cooperation in Europe (CSCE), which oversaw the implementation of the Helsinki Accords. When an anonymous member of the New Jersey delegation criticized Fenwick as "not into the hard work of putting together coalitions necessary to get legislation passed," her Democratic committee colleague Stephen Solarz praised Fenwick in an open letter for her active participation on drafting sanctions against Rhodesia, providing military assistance to El Salvador, and promoting nuclear nonproliferation.

==== 1982 United States Senate campaign ====
In 1982, Fenwick ran for United States Senate. She defeated conservative Jeff Bell in the Republican primary. In the general election, she was considered the heavy favorite over Democratic businessman Frank Lautenberg. However, Lautenberg outspent Fenwick using his personal fortune, and his criticisms of Reaganomics were effective with the New Jersey electorate which was still suffering from the ongoing economic recession. After the election, Fenwick admitted, "I never expected to lose. I had no concession speech prepared, or anything. I never expected to lose."

After Fenwick left the House following her loss, President Ronald Reagan appointed her as United States Ambassador to the Food and Agriculture Organization of the United Nations in Rome. She held the position from June 1983 to March 1987, when she retired from public life at the age of 77.

== Personal life and image ==
Fenwick was 5 feet 10 inches tall. For the duration of her political career, Fenwick wore tailored wool-tweed suits from her time as a fashion model in the 1940s. She was fluent in Italian, French and Spanish, which she attributed to self-study.

In 1982, her personal wealth was estimated at approximately $5 million (approximately $14 million in 2025 dollars), which she described as "too high." Most of her assets were held in custodial accounts.

Her cousin, John Hammond, was a well-known record producer, and she was the grandmother of Habitat for Humanity CEO Jonathan Reckford and great-grandmother of U.S. Olympic rower Mary Reckford.

== Death and legacy ==
Fenwick died of heart failure in her home town of Bernardsville on September 16, 1992.

=== Legacy ===
The Millicent Fenwick Monument, a sculpture by Dana Toomey, was paid for by voluntary donations and unveiled in October 1995. Always decorated, it is near the Bernardsville train station.

Some consider Fenwick the model for the character of Lacey Davenport in Garry Trudeau's comic strip Doonesbury, although Trudeau himself has insisted the character was modeled on no one in particular, and Davenport first appeared several months before Fenwick was elected to Congress.

== Electoral history ==
- 1974 U.S. House
  - Millicent Fenwick (R), 53.4%
  - Frederick Bohen (D), 43.5%
- 1976 U.S. House
  - Millicent Fenwick (R), 66.9%
  - Frank Nero (D), 31.3%
- 1978 U.S. House
  - Millicent Fenwick (R), 72.6%
  - John Fahy (D), 27.4%
- 1980 U.S. House
  - Millicent Fenwick (R), 77.5%
  - Kieran Pillon, Jr. (D) 20.5%
- 1982 U.S. Senate
  - Frank Lautenberg (D), 51%
  - Millicent Fenwick (R), 48%

== See also ==
- Women in the United States House of Representatives

U.S. House of Representatives
Preceded by Peter Frelinghuysen	Member of the U.S. House of Representatives from New Jersey's 5th congressional district 1975–1983	Succeeded by Marge Roukema
Party political offices
Preceded by David Norcross	Republican nominee for U.S. Senator from New Jersey (Class 1); 1982	Succeeded by Pete Dawkins
Diplomatic posts
New office	United States Ambassador to the United Nations Agencies for Food and Agriculture; 1983–1987	Succeeded by Fred Eckert
