= Jules Levin =

American politician (1922–1988)

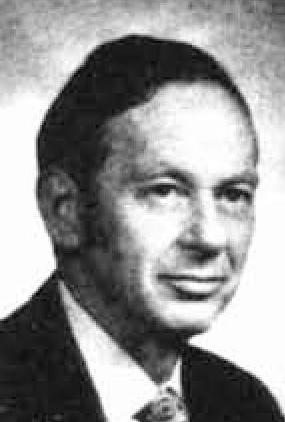
Levin in 1976

Julius "Jules" Levin (3 February 1922 – 16 May 1988) was the last Socialist Labor Party of America candidate for President of the United States, in the 1976 election; his running mate was Constance Blomen. It was after Levin's poor showing in this election that the SLP chose to forgo competing in presidential elections (and later all elections as their membership dwindled).

Levin was the Socialist Labor nominee for Governor of New Jersey in 1965, 1969, 1977, 1981 and 1985; for the United States Senate from New Jersey in 1966, 1972, 1982, and 1984; for the United States House of Representatives from New Jersey in 1958, 1960, 1964, 1968, 1974, 1978 and 1980; and for the New Jersey General Assembly in 1975.

Preceded by Louis Fisher	Socialist Labor Party Presidential candidate 1976	Succeeded by —
Preceded by Albert Ronis	Socialist Labor Party New Jersey Gubernatorial candidate 1965, 1969, 1977, 1981, 1985	Succeeded by —
