= Marge Roukema =

American politician (1929–2014)

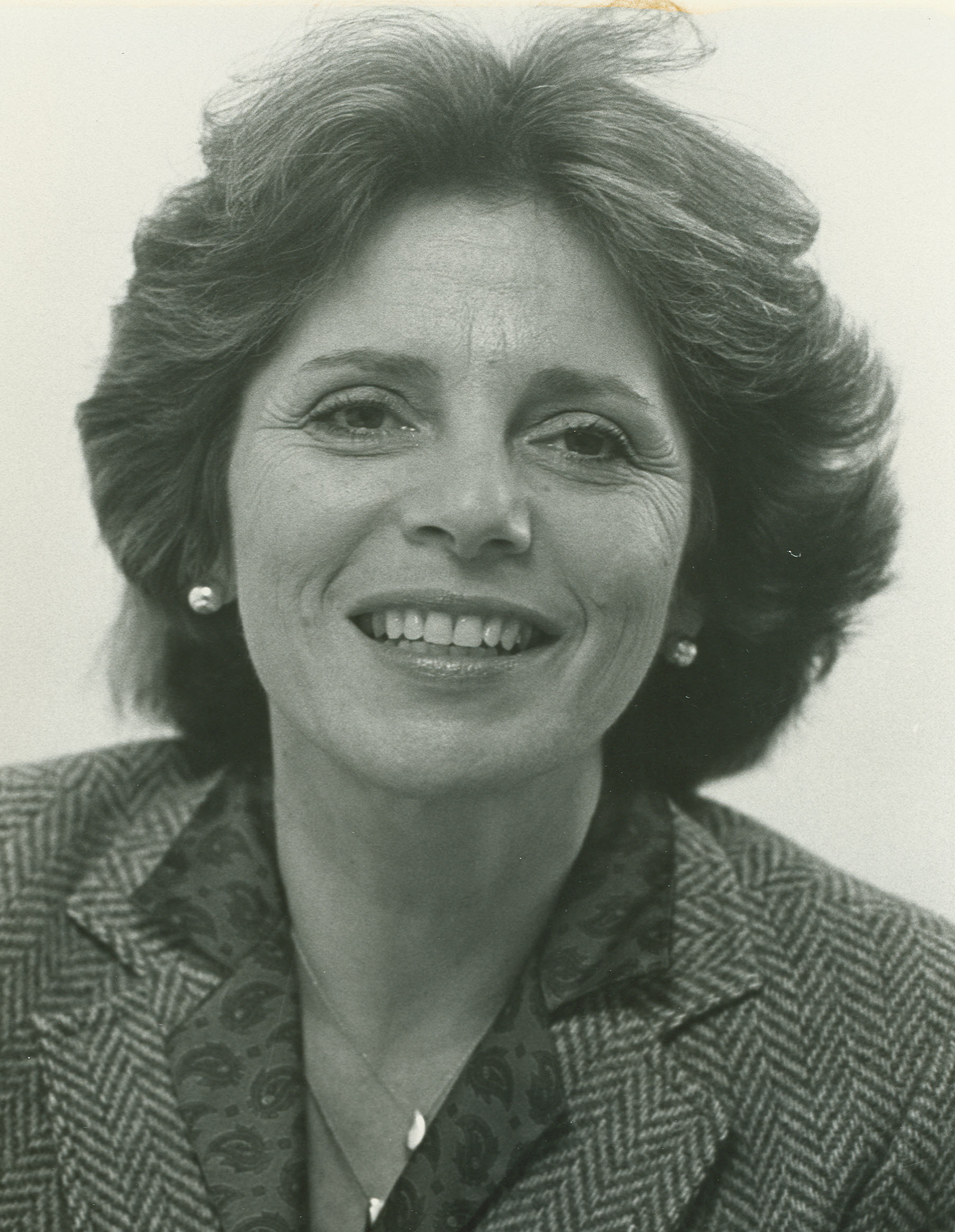

Member of the U.S. House of Representatives from New Jersey
- In office January 3, 1981 – January 3, 2003
- Preceded by: Andrew Maguire
- Succeeded by: Scott Garrett
- Constituency: 7th district (1981–1983); 5th district (1983–2003)

Personal details
- Born: Margaret Scafati; September 19, 1929 Newark, New Jersey, U.S.
- Died: November 12, 2014 (aged 85) Wyckoff, New Jersey, U.S.
- Party: Republican
- Spouse: Richard Roukema
- Education: Montclair State University (BA); Rutgers University, Newark (attended)

Margaret "Marge" Ellen Roukema (née Scafati; September 19, 1929 – November 12, 2014) was an American Republican Party politician who represented New Jersey in the U.S. House of Representatives from 1981 to 2003.

== Early life and education ==
Roukema was born Margaret Ellen Scafati on September 19, 1929, in Newark, New Jersey, and raised in West Orange, New Jersey, the daughter of Claude and Margaret Scafati. She graduated from West Orange High School in 1947. She earned a Bachelor of Arts degree in history and political science from Montclair State College in 1951, and she also did graduate work at Montclair State. In addition, she took graduate courses in city and regional planning at Rutgers University.

== Career ==
Roukema began her career as a high school American history teacher in Ridgewood, New Jersey. She served as a member of the board of education of the Ridgewood Public Schools from 1970 to 1973.

=== U.S. House of Representatives ===
In 1978, Roukema ran for Congress against incumbent Democratic Congressman Andrew Maguire, losing by approximately 9,000 votes. In 1980, Roukema challenged Maguire again and won; her campaign was helped by successful Republican presidential candidate Ronald Reagan's presence at the top of the ticket. She was re-elected 11 times without facing serious Democratic opposition.

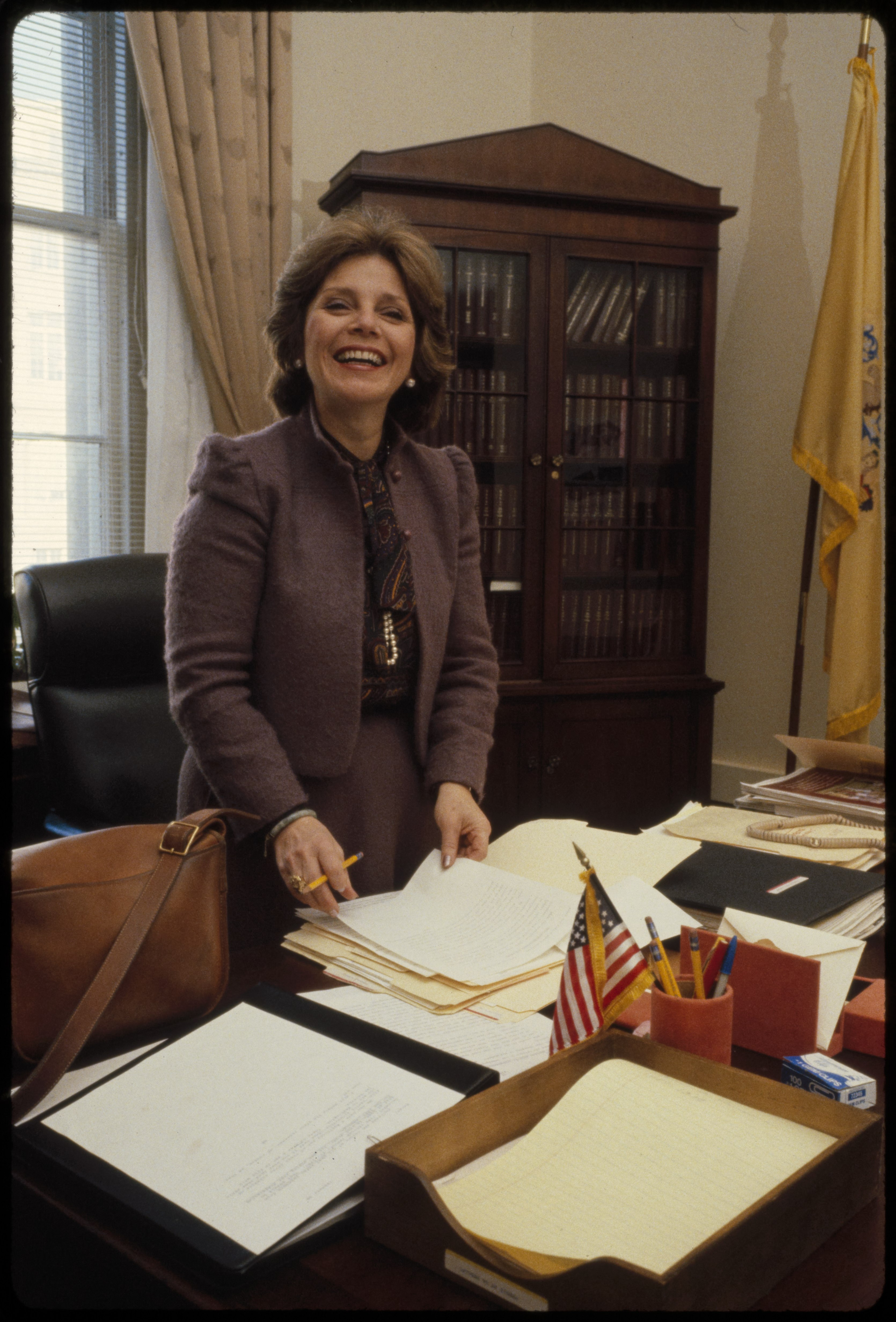
Roukema in 1982

Roukema was a moderate Republican known for her staunch support for the Family and Medical Leave Act (FMLA). During her congressional career, she represented New Jersey's 7th and 5th congressional districts, respectively. In 1992, she faced a primary challenge from three other Republicans and prevailed. In 1998, State Assemblyman Scott Garrett, a considerably more conservative Republican, challenged her in the Republican primary. Roukema managed to fight him off, and did so again in 2000.

=== Retirement ===
With the prospect of a third consecutive primary challenge from Garrett in 2002 (in a district made even more conservative on paper by redistricting), as well as facing the loss of her subcommittee chairs due to caucus term limits, the Ridgewood Republican opted not to seek a 12th term and retired from politics. She endorsed State Senator Gerald Cardinale in the ensuing primary, which he lost to Garrett. Despite Roukema's refusal to endorse him, Garrett was elected as her successor. She left office in 2003. At the time of her retirement, Roukema was the longest-tenured female member of Congress.

== Personal life and death ==
Roukema was married to psychiatrist Richard W. Roukema. The Roukemas had three children: Greg, Todd, and Meg. Todd Roukema died of leukemia in October 1976.

On November 12, 2014, Roukema died in Wyckoff, New Jersey, at the age of 85. She had Alzheimer's disease.

== See also ==
- Women in the United States House of Representatives

U.S. House of Representatives
Preceded by Andrew Maguire	Member of the U.S. House of Representatives from New Jersey's 7th congressional district 1981–1983	Succeeded by Matt Rinaldo
Preceded by Millicent Fenwick	Member of the U.S. House of Representatives from New Jersey's 5th congressional district 1983–2003	Succeeded by Scott Garrett
