= Matthew J. Rinaldo =

American politician

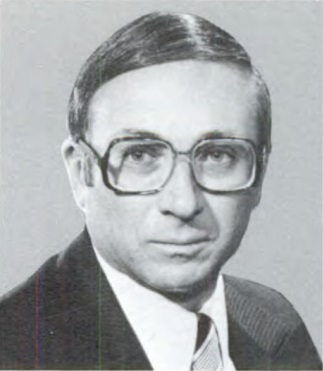
- Rinaldo in 1981

Member of the U.S. House of Representatives from New Jersey
- In office January 3, 1973 – January 3, 1993
- Preceded by: Florence P. Dwyer
- Succeeded by: Bob Franks
- Constituency: 12th district (1973–1983); 7th district (1983–1993)

Member of the New Jersey Senate from the 9th (at-large) district
- In office January 9, 1968 – January 3, 1973
- Preceded by: Mildred Barry Hughes; Nelson Stamler
- Succeeded by: William J. McCloud

Personal details
- Born: Matthew John Rinaldo; September 1, 1931 Elizabeth, New Jersey, U.S.
- Died: October 13, 2008 (aged 77) West Caldwell, New Jersey, U.S.
- Party: Republican
- Education: Rutgers University, New Brunswick (BS); Seton Hall University (MBA); New York University (DPA)

Matthew John "Matt" Rinaldo (September 1, 1931 – October 13, 2008) was an American Republican Party politician who represented New Jersey in the United States House of Representatives for ten terms, serving in the 12th congressional district (1973–1983) and in the 7th congressional district (1983–1993).

== Early life and education ==
Born in Elizabeth, New Jersey, Rinaldo graduated from St. Benedict’s Prep in Newark, N.J. in 1949, then went on to receive a B.S. from Rutgers University (1953), an M.B.A., Seton Hall University (1959) and a D.P.A., from New York University, Robert F. Wagner Graduate School of Public Service (1979).

== Political career ==
He was elected to the Union Township Zoning Board of Adjustment, serving from 1962 to 1963, the Union County Board of Chosen Freeholders from 1963 to 1964, and the New Jersey Senate from 1967 to 1972.

=== Congress ===
Rinaldo was elected as a Republican to the 93rd and to the nine succeeding U.S. Congresses (January 3, 1973 – January 3, 1993). Representative Rinaldo sat on the House Permanent Committee on Select Aging, as Minority Leader of the Committee, and the House Committee for Energy and Commerce.

Prior to his retirement, Rinaldo listed among his top accomplishments a bill to limit the airing of commercials during children's programming and securing public access to pollution data under the Superfund law.

== Death ==
He died on October 13, 2008, from complications related to Parkinson's disease after several years of poor health.

U.S. House of Representatives
Preceded by Florence P. Dwyer	Member of the U.S. House of Representatives from New Jersey's 12th congressional district 1973–1983	Succeeded by James A. Courter
Preceded by Marge Roukema	Member of the U.S. House of Representatives from New Jersey's 7th congressional district 1983–1993	Succeeded by Bob Franks
