= Andrew Maguire (politician) =

American politician

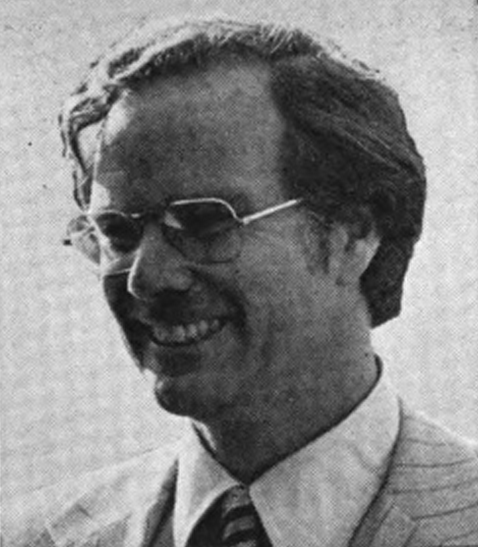

Member of the U.S. House of Representatives from New Jersey's 7th district
- In office January 3, 1975 – January 3, 1981
- Preceded by: William B. Widnall
- Succeeded by: Marge Roukema

Personal details
- Born: Gene Andrew Maguire; March 11, 1939 (age 87) Columbus, Ohio, U.S.
- Party: Democratic
- Education: Oberlin College (BA); Harvard University (MA, PhD)

Gene Andrew Maguire (born March 11, 1939) is an American politician who served three terms as a Democratic member of the United States House of Representatives, representing New Jersey's 7th congressional district (western Bergen County) from 1975 to 1981.

== Early life and education ==
Maguire attended Budlong Elementary School in Los Angeles, California, and graduated from Ridgewood High School in Ridgewood, New Jersey in 1957. He received a B.A. from Oberlin College in 1961, and a Ph.D. in government from Harvard University in 1966. He was awarded the George F. Baker, Danforth Foundation, Woodrow Wilson, and Ford Foundation’s Foreign Area Training scholarships for undergraduate and post-graduate studies.

== Professional career ==
Maguire was an advisor on political and security affairs in the United States Department of State from 1966–1969, and a member of the United States Delegation to the United Nations General Assembly. He was director of the Urban Development Program for Jamaica, Queens, New York from 1969–1972, and a consultant in the National Affairs Division of the Ford Foundation from 1972-1974.

=== Congress ===
Maguire was elected as a Democrat to the Ninety-fourth, Ninety-fifth and Ninety-sixth Congresses, serving in office from January 3, 1975-January 3, 1981. In his first election to Congress in a Republican district, he defeated William B. Widnall - one of the most senior members in the House.

Maguire served on the Health and Environment, Energy, and Oversight subcommittees of the House Commerce Committee and helped found the New Members’ Caucus. In Congress, he worked on:

- Health and mental health policy, including occupational safety and health and expanded health programs for children and youth
- Environmental policy, including the Clean Air Act and control of toxic waste; and authored what became known as the Maguire Amendments to the National Cancer Act
- Energy policy, including supply and pricing of fossil fuels, nuclear, solar and other energy resources; and energy conservation including auto mileage efficiency standards and renewable resources initiatives
- Foreign policy issues including arms control, democracy initiatives, and trade
- Banking and securities laws and regulation
- Congressional ethics reform
- Increasing citizen participation in his congressional district by holding regular issue forums focused on a wide range of public policy concerns

=== Senate campaign ===
In 1980, Maguire was defeated by Republican challenger Marge Roukema and in 1982 ran as a candidate for nomination to the United States Senate, falling short by 11,788 votes and placing second to Frank Lautenberg in the 10-candidate New Jersey Democratic primary election.

=== Later career ===
He was a Fellow at the Institute of Politics, John F. Kennedy School of Government, Harvard University in 1983; vice president for policy, World Resources Institute from 1984 to 1987; chief executive officer, North American Securities Administrators Association from 1987 to 1989; and president, EnterpriseWorks Worldwide (now merged with Relief International) from 1990 to 2002. Described by the Washington Business Journal as a "...Peace Corps with a business plan," EnterpriseWorks assists small-scale farmers and entrepreneurs throughout the developing world increase incomes and create jobs with self-help business development services that include productivity and marketing improvements. As an independent consultant from 2003 to 2006, he advised corporate and public sector clients on domestic and international business development, job creation, and marketing initiatives.

Maguire served as executive director of The GAVI Fund's "Immunize Every Child Campaign" from 2007 to 2009 . In that role, he helped advance the global alliance's goal to ensure that "every child everywhere" is immunized against life-threatening diseases with a focus on the world's 75 poorest countries. From 2009 to 2010, he was senior advisor for Clean Air-Cool Planet where he designed and managed a bi-partisan national initiative on market-based emissions reduction strategies. As Vice President for Health at the Environmental Defense Fund (2011-2012), he concentrated on corporate and Congressional initiatives to protect the health of consumers from hazardous materials in household and personal care products used every day.

In 2012, Maguire was approached by local Democratic Party leadership in New Jersey's 5th congressional district about challenging GOP incumbent Scott Garrett in 2014. According to NewJersey.com, Maguire “expressed interest in taking on Garrett” and returned to his hometown of Ridgewood to explore the race. He eventually decided not to run and did not enter the campaign, which Garrett ultimately won decisively.

== Personal life ==
Maguire is married to Adele De Marco, a speech-language pathologist. He has four children (Jay, Katherine, Sara, and Andrew), two step-children (Joe and Darren), and two grandchildren (Reve and Jack).

== Publications ==
His publications include Bordering on Trouble: Resources and Politics in Latin America (Alder & Alder, 1986, co-editor); Toward Uhuru in Tanzania: The Politics of Participation (Cambridge University Press, 1969); contributions to journals and edited volumes; and articles, speeches, testimony, and opinion pieces on issues of public policy.

U.S. House of Representatives
| Preceded by William B. Widnall | Member of the U.S. House of Representatives from New Jersey's 7th congressional district 1975–1981 | Succeeded by Marge Roukema |
U.S. order of precedence (ceremonial)
| Preceded by Susan Wild as Former U.S. Representative | Order of precedence of the United States as Former U.S. Representative | Succeeded by Harold C. Hollenbeck as Former U.S. Representative |
