= Frank Thompson =

American politician (1918–1989)

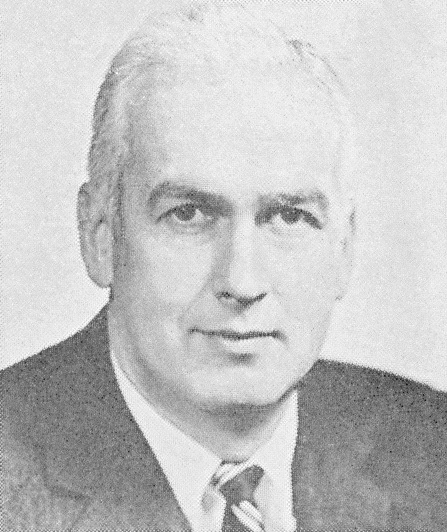

Chair of the House Administration Committee
- In office June 18, 1976 – December 29, 1980
- Preceded by: Wayne Hays
- Succeeded by: Lucien N. Nedzi

Member of the U.S. House of Representatives from New Jersey's 4th district
- In office January 3, 1955 – December 29, 1980
- Preceded by: Charles R. Howell
- Succeeded by: Chris Smith

Personal details
- Born: July 26, 1918 Trenton, New Jersey, U.S.
- Died: July 22, 1989 (aged 70) Baltimore, Maryland, U.S.
- Resting place: Arlington National Cemetery
- Party: Democratic
- Education: Wake Forest University (BA, LLB)

Frank Thompson Jr. (July 26, 1918 – July 22, 1989) was an American politician. He represented New Jersey's 4th congressional district in the United States House of Representatives as a Democrat from 1955 to 1980, and was chairman of the House Administration Committee from 1976 to 1980.

He is one of seven federal politicians who were convicted in the Abscam case in 1980. As a result, he resigned from Congress and served two years in prison.

== Life and career ==
Thompson was born in Trenton, New Jersey. He attended Wake Forest University, from which he earned a degree in law from the Wake Forest University School of Law.

Following the outbreak of World War II, Thompson put his legal career on hold to serve in the United States Navy. From 1941 to 1948 Thompson was on active duty. He received three combat decorations for distinguished service at Iwo Jima and Okinawa. After a few years of practicing law, Thompson returned to the military and from August 1950 to January 1952, commanded the United States Navy Reserve Battalion 4-68 completing a seventeen-month tour of active duty, on the staff of the commander, Eastern Sea Frontier.

Between 1950 and 1954, he was a member of the New Jersey General Assembly from Mercer County, serving as minority leader during his second term.

== Tenure in Congress ==
In 1954, he successfully ran as a Democrat for a seat in Congress. Thompson was a liberal voice in the House. He was also a strong supporter of John F. Kennedy and ran Kennedy's voter registration operations in the 1960 Presidential election.

From 1969 to 1971, he chaired the House Subcommittee on Libraries and Memorials and during his tenure conducted the first-ever comprehensive hearings into the operations of the Smithsonian Institution. From 1975 to 1978, he also chaired the Joint Committee on Printing. He sponsored legislation that created both the National Endowment for the Arts and the National Endowment for the Humanities and authored the legislation to establish the John F. Kennedy Center for the Performing Arts.

He was a ranking member of his party, serving as the chairman of the Committee on House Administration during his final three terms.

=== Abscam conviction ===
In February 1980, Thompson was one of six Congressmen who were implicated in the Abscam sting. Despite the charges, Thompson ran for re-election. He faced 27-year-old Republican Chris Smith whom he had easily dispatched in 1978. The accusations weighed on the campaign and Smith defeated Thompson with 57% of the vote.

Although Thompson maintained his innocence, he was convicted of bribery and conspiracy charges on December 3, 1980. On December 29, 1980, he resigned from Congress. In 1981, an appeals court upheld his conviction and he received a sentence of three years in prison. He served two years at the federal prison in Lexington, Kentucky before he was granted parole in 1985.

== Later life ==
After his release, he quietly lived out his days in Alexandria, Virginia. On July 20, 1989, he had surgery for esophageal cancer at Johns Hopkins Hospital in Baltimore, and died there on July 22, 1989, four days before his 71st birthday. Thompson was survived by his wife, Evelina Van Metre Thompson who died in Washington D.C. on March 20, 2019, as well as his two daughters Anne Henderson and Nina Altschiller, and three granddaughters, Amy-Louise Parker, Janney Thompson Lyons and Gillian Elizabeth Lyons.

== See also ==
- List of American federal politicians convicted of crimes
- List of federal political scandals in the United States

U.S. House of Representatives
Preceded by Charles R. Howell	Member of the U.S. House of Representatives from New Jersey's 4th congressional district 1955–1980	Succeeded by Chris Smith
Preceded by Wayne Hays	Chair of the House Administration Committee; 1976–1980	Succeeded by Lucien N. Nedzi
Preceded by Wayne Hays	Chair of the House Printing Committee; 1976–1977	Succeeded by Howard Cannon
Preceded by Howard Cannon	Chair of the House Printing Committee; 1979–1980	Succeeded by Charles Mathias
