= Jim Courter =

American politician

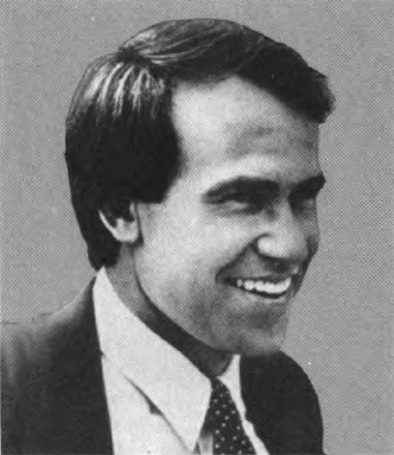

Chair of the Defense Base Closure and Realignment Commission
- In office 1991–1994
- President: George H. W. Bush; Bill Clinton
- Preceded by: Position established
- Succeeded by: Alan J. Dixon

Member of the U.S. House of Representatives from New Jersey
- In office January 3, 1979 – January 3, 1991
- Preceded by: Helen Stevenson Meyner
- Succeeded by: Dick Zimmer
- Constituency: 13th district (1979–1983); 12th district (1983–1991)

Personal details
- Born: James Andrew Courter; October 14, 1941 (age 84) Montclair, New Jersey, U.S.
- Party: Republican
- Education: Colgate University (BA); Duke University (JD)

James Andrew Courter (born October 14, 1941) is an American Republican Party politician and attorney. He represented parts of northwestern New Jersey in the United States House of Representatives from 1979 to 1991. In 1989, he unsuccessfully ran for Governor of New Jersey.

== Early life and education ==
Courter was born October 14, 1941, in Montclair, New Jersey.

Courter graduated from Montclair Academy in 1959, received a Bachelor of Arts degree in 1963 from Colgate University, and earned a Juris Doctor degree from Duke University School of Law in 1966. After law school, Courter became a Peace Corps volunteer in Venezuela. He was admitted to the bar in Washington, D.C., in 1966 and in New Jersey in 1971.

== Career ==
Courter served as an assistant corporation counsel for Washington, D.C., from 1969 to 1970. He worked for Union County Legal Services from 1970 to 1971. In 1972, Courter founded a law firm in Hackettstown, New Jersey. Courter was a first assistant prosecutor in Warren County from 1973 to 1977. He co-founded Warren County Legal Services in 1975 and served as an attorney for municipalities in Warren and Sussex counties.

A Republican, Courter served as a member of the U.S. House of Representatives for 12 years, from 1979 until 1991. He represented New Jersey's 13th congressional district and later the 12th district, located in northwestern New Jersey. Courter was described as the most conservative member of New Jersey's congressional delegation. He was the Republican nominee for governor of New Jersey in 1989, but lost in a landslide to Democrat Jim Florio. Courter did not seek re-election to Congress in 1990.

From 1991 to 1993, Courter served as chairman of the Base Closure and Realignment Commission.

== Personal life ==
Courter is married to Carmen Courter.

In 1990, a 12-ton recreational vehicle collided with the front of the Courters' Hackettstown, New Jersey home. The Courters were unhurt.

The Courters' daughter, Katrina, married Taylor Whitman, son of former New Jersey Governor Christine Todd Whitman, in 2006.

== Works ==
- Defending Democracy, American Studies Center, June 1, 1986 ISBN 0-931727-04-9
- Defense Base Closure & Realignment Commission: Report to the President, Diane Publishing Co, April 1, 1994 ISBN 0-7881-0695-3

U.S. House of Representatives
Preceded by Helen Stevenson Meyner	Member of the U.S. House of Representatives from New Jersey's 13th congressional district 1979–1983	Succeeded by Edwin B. Forsythe
Preceded by Matthew J. Rinaldo	Member of the U.S. House of Representatives from New Jersey's 12th congressional district 1983–1991	Succeeded by Dick Zimmer
Party political offices
Preceded by Thomas Kean	Republican nominee for Governor of New Jersey; 1989	Succeeded by Christine Todd Whitman
U.S. order of precedence (ceremonial)
Preceded by Matt Cartwright as Former U.S. Representative	Order of precedence of the United States as Former U.S. Representative	Succeeded by Buddy Darden as Former U.S. Representative
