= 1974 United States House of Representatives elections in New Jersey =

- November 5, 1974

All 15 New Jersey seats to the United States House of Representatives
- Turnout: 62% (▼18pp)
	Majority party	Minority party
Party	Democratic	Republican
Last election	8	7
Seats won	12	3
Seat change	▲4	▼4
Popular vote	1,240,933	794,698
Percentage	59.6%	38.1%
Swing	▲10.5pp	▼11.9pp
Democratic
40–50%
50–60%
60–70%
70–80%
Republican
50–60%
60–70%

The 1974 United States House of Representatives elections in New Jersey were held on November 5, 1974, to determine who would represent the people of New Jersey in the United States House of Representatives. This election coincided with national elections for U.S. House and U.S. Senate. New Jersey had fifteen seats in the House, apportioned according to the 1970 United States census. Representatives are elected for two-year terms.

The 1974 elections were held amid the national Watergate scandal and resulted in major gains for the Democratic Party. In New Jersey, the Democrats won four seats held by Republican incumbents and retained all of their existing seats.

The only open race in the state was in the 5th district, where Republican incumbent Peter Frelinghuysen Jr. retired. He was succeeded by Millicent Fenwick, who won an extremely close Republican primary over Thomas Kean.

== Overview ==
1974 United States House of Representatives elections in New Jersey
Party	Votes	Percentage	Candidates	Seats	+/–
Democratic	1,240,933	59.56%	15	12	▲4
Republican	794,698	38.14%	15	3	▼4
Socialist Labor	5,122	0.25%	4	0	Steady
Communist	1,899	0.09%	1	0	Steady
Independents	40,905	1.96%	15	0	Steady
Totals	2,083,557	100.00%	49	15	Steady

== District 1 ==
1974 New Jersey's 1st congressional district election
- November 5, 1974
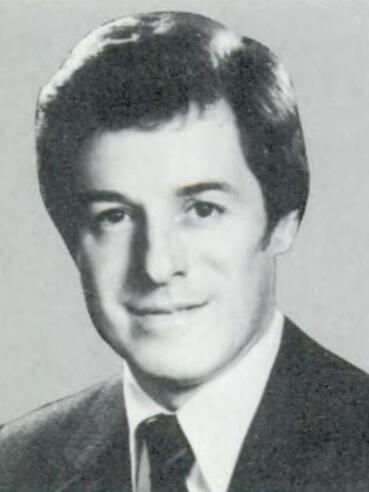

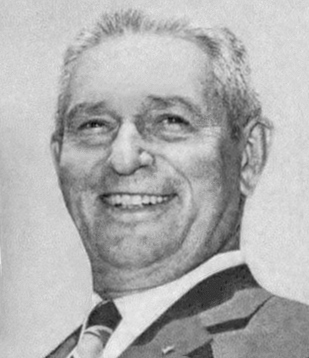
Nominee	James Florio	John E. Hunt
Party	Democratic	Republican
Popular vote	80,768	54,069
Percentage	57.5%	38.5%
U.S. Representative before election
John E. Hunt
Republican
Elected U.S. Representative
James Florio
Democratic

The district included Gloucester County and parts of Camden County.

Republican incumbent John E. Hunt ran for a fifth term in office, but he was defeated by Democratic assemblyman James Florio.

=== Republican primary ===
==== Candidates ====
- John E. Hunt, incumbent representative since 1967

==== Campaign ====
Hunt formally announced his campaign late in April, only after receiving the endorsement of the Camden County Republican organization. He had received the Gloucester County organization endorsement much earlier.

The Republican organizations in the two counties had been fractured by the 1973 gubernatorial campaign, in which Charles W. Sandman Jr. defeated incumbent William T. Cahill, a Camden County native, for the Republican nomination. As the nominee, Sandman replaced many Cahill supporters with his own supporters, bitterly dividing local Republicans.

==== Results ====
1974 Republican primary
Party	Candidate	Votes	%
Republican	John E. Hunt (incumbent)	9,317	100.00%
Total votes		9,317	100.00%

=== Democratic primary ===
==== Candidates ====
- James Florio, assemblyman from Camden and nominee for this district in 1972
- Walter C. Gebelein Jr.
- Judith L. Holzer

==== Campaign ====
Florio won the Camden County Democratic organization endorsement, which was considered tantamount to nomination, in April.

==== Results ====
1974 Democratic primary
Party	Candidate	Votes	%
Democratic	James Florio	15,671	82.94%
Democratic	Walter C. Gebelein Jr.	2,127	11.26%
Democratic	Judith L. Holzer	1,097	5.81%
Total votes		18,895	100.00%

=== General election ===
==== Candidates ====
- Raymond Carotenuto, Turnersville resident (An Independent American)
- Elizabeth L. Drevs, Haddonfield freelance writer and candidate for this district in 1972 (Independent)
- James Florio, assemblyman from Camden and nominee for this district in 1972 (Democratic)
- John E. Hunt, incumbent representative since 1967 (Republican)
- Bradley S. Kirsch, Bellmawr resident (Independents Against Apathy)
- Julius Levin (Socialist Labor)
- James Perry, mayor of Somerdale (Independent Tax Watchdog)
- Pedro J. Torres (Independent)

===== Withdrew =====
- Emilio Andujar (Labor)

==== Campaign ====
In a rematch of the 1972 campaign, Hunt faced Florio. The incumbent launched his campaign in April at a Cherry Hill fundraiser headlined by Strom Thurmond and was immediately challenged to a debate by Florio. Hunt agreed, and over the course of the campaign agreed to two more television debates, but declined any "joint appearances" with Florio which excluded the six minor candidates.

At the start of the campaign, Florio declared to The New York Times that Hunt, considered by many New Jersey's most conservative congressman, was "one of the country's foremost apologists for Nixon, even on Watergate." Hunt denied that the Watergate scandal would be an issue in the campaign and claimed that Democratic victories in four out of five special elections in safe Republican districts only indicated that "Republicans don't come out to vote in special elections." However, Camden County Republican chair Henry R. Leiner said that Watergate would "make a difference," and the campaign would focus on distancing Hunt from the scandal. Nixon was not invited to campaign for Hunt.

Florio campaigned around the clock throughout the summer, in a noted contrast to Hunt's low-key campaign. Hunt continued to defend Nixon until August, when the president admitted to withholding evidence from the Watergate investigators and resigned from office, which Florio conceded undercut his own campaign message.

After Nixon's resignation, both candidates focused on economic issues. In addition to ongoing price inflation, the district faced unemployment rates well above national and state averages. Florio was endorsed by most labor unions, including the state AFL-CIO and the New Jersey Education Association, while Hunt was endorsed by the National Association of Businessmen.

Late in the campaign, Florio was hampered by a corruption scandal among his own supporters when Camden mayor Angelo Errichetti, the head of the Democratic organization in the city, appeared in court on criminal charges for perjury and conspiracy to evade contract bidding laws. In an apparent signal that his campaign was struggling, Hunt was offered a role at the Pentagon as assistant secretary of the Army, but he declined.

==== Results ====
Florio was the first Democratic candidate to win the Camden County district in 102 years. As of 2026, no Democratic nominee has lost it since.

1974 U.S. House election
Party	Candidate	Votes	%	±%
Democratic	James Florio	80,768	57.50%	
Republican	John E. Hunt (incumbent)	54,069	38.49%	
Independent	James Perry	3,276	2.33%	
Independent	Bradley S. Kirsch	805	0.57%	
Independent	Elizabeth L. Drevs	713	0.51%	
Independent	Raymond Carotenuto	389	0.28%	
Socialist Labor	Julius Levin	301	0.21%	
Independent	Pedro Torres	147	0.10%	
Total votes		140,468	100.00%	
Democratic gain from Republican		Swing	{{{swing}}}	

== District 2 ==
1974 New Jersey's 2nd congressional district election
- November 5, 1974
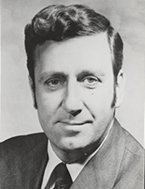

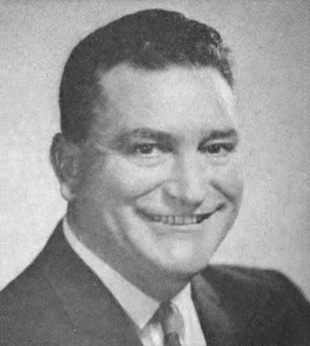
Nominee	William J. Hughes	Charles W. Sandman Jr.
Party	Democratic	Republican
Popular vote	109,763	79,064
Percentage	57.3%	41.3%
U.S. Representative before election
Charles W. Sandman Jr.
Republican
Elected U.S. Representative
William J. Hughes
Democratic

This district, the largest in South Jersey, included all of Atlantic, Cape May, Cumberland, and Salem counties and parts of Burlington and Ocean counties.

Republican incumbent Charles W. Sandman Jr., who had been the Republican nominee for governor in 1973, ran for re-election to a fifth term in office, but he was defeated by Democratic nominee William J. Hughes.

=== Background ===
In the 1973 gubernatorial election, Charles W. Sandman Jr. defeated incumbent governor William T. Cahill in the Republican primary. Sandman's victory was a surprising upset and considered a rebuke of the liberalism and corruption of the Cahill administration, but he lost the general election in a landslide to former Essex County prosecutor Brendan Byrne.

Sandman's campaign was hampered by his long support for President Nixon and the early stages of the Watergate investigation. He lost every county in the state except his native Cape May and was considered vulnerable for re-election.

=== Republican primary ===
==== Candidates ====
- Charles W. Sandman Jr., incumbent representative since 1967 and nominee for governor in 1973

==== Results ====
1974 Republican primary
Party	Candidate	Votes	%
Republican	Charles W. Sandman Jr. (inc.)	28,754	100.00%
Total votes		28,754	100.00%

=== Democratic primary ===
==== Candidates ====
- Wesley K. Bell, mayor of Stafford Township
- Frank Louis DeMarco
- Robert Dragotta
- William J. Hughes, Ocean City attorney, former assistant prosecutor, and nominee for this district in 1970
- Michael J. Matthews, Atlantic County freeholder
- Charles L. Scarani, Cumberland County freeholder

==== Results ====
1974 Democratic primary
Party	Candidate	Votes	%
Democratic	William J. Hughes	12,347	54.97%
Democratic	Michael J. Matthews	5,025	22.37%
Democratic	Charles L. Scarani	2,455	10.93%
Democratic	Frank Louis DeMarco	1,408	6.27%
Democratic	Wesley K. Bell	892	3.97%
Democratic	Robert Dragotta	335	1.49%
Total votes		22,462	100.00%

=== General election ===
==== Candidates ====
- William J. Hughes, Ocean City attorney, former assistant prosecutor, and nominee for this district in 1970 (Democratic)
- Charles W. Sandman Jr., incumbent representative since 1975 and nominee for governor in 1973 (Republican)
- Andrew Wenger, builder (Independent)

==== Campaign ====
Sandman's reputation as a Nixon supporter intensified when the House Judiciary Committee, on which he served, opened impeachment inquiries into Nixon. Throughout the hearings, which ran on television through the summer, Sandman offered the most vitriolic and aggressive defense of Nixon of any committee member. Sandman became famous to national television audiences for his daily efforts to frame the impeachment inquiry as a partisan attack.

Sandman's strong and vociferous support for Nixon made him one of the nation's leading targets for backlash to the Watergate scandal, and the race was seen as a referendum on public reaction to it. Sandman did not shy away from his reputation for combative conservatism and support for Nixon, running highway billboard advertisements throughout the district portraying himself in front of microphones during the House Judiciary Committee's impeachment inquiry with the caption, "When he speaks, the nation listens ...".

Despite Sandman's Hughes criticized both the substance and manner of Sandman's position on impeachment, arguing that the incumbent's "posture" had "showed the nation of what he is really like. Instead of the civility of the other Republicans on the committee, Sandman chose instead to grandstand, to be partisan, to be deceitful." He referred to Sandman as "a carnival barker... who couldn't possibly see right from wrong, even when it was staring him in the face." Although Hughes had nearly defeated him in 1970, Sandman embraced Hughes's frame of the election as a referendum on his own behavior and personality, saying, "There'll be no votes for Hughes. All the votes will be either for or against me."

Hughes was also critical of heavy defense spending, corporate special interests, the congressional system of seniority, and the federal tax structure, which he said favored the rich.

==== Results ====
Hughes won easily. Following his defeat, Sandman claimed, "This was just not a Republican year."

1974 U.S. House election
Party	Candidate	Votes	%	±%
Democratic	William J. Hughes	109,763	57.31%	
Republican	Charles W. Sandman Jr. (inc.)	79,064	41.28%	
Independent	Andrew Wenger	2,693	1.41%	
Total votes		191,520	100.00%	
Democratic gain from Republican		Swing	{{{swing}}}	

== District 3 ==
1974 New Jersey's 3rd congressional district election
- November 5, 1974
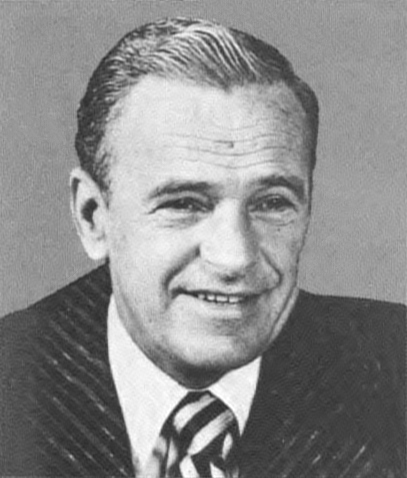

Nominee	James J. Howard	Kenneth W. Clark
Party	Democratic	Republican
Popular vote	105,979	45,932
Percentage	68.9%	29.8%
U.S. Representative before election
James J. Howard
Democratic
Elected U.S. Representative
James J. Howard
Democratic

This district included parts of Monmouth and Ocean counties.

Democratic incumbent James J. Howard was re-elected to a sixth term in office.

=== Democratic primary ===
==== Candidates ====
- James J. Howard, incumbent representative since 1965

==== Results ====
1974 Democratic primary
Party	Candidate	Votes	%
Democratic	James J. Howard (incumbent)	11,480	100.00%
Total votes		11,480	100.00%

=== Republican primary ===
==== Candidates ====
- Kenneth W. Clark, former mayor of Freehold Township

==== Campaign ====
Republican leaders unsuccessfully tried to recruit several potential candidates before Clark, a pilot and the former mayor of Freehold Township, stepped forward.

==== Results ====
1974 Republican primary
Party	Candidate	Votes	%
Republican	Kenneth W. Clark	8,339	100.00%
Total votes		8,339	100.00%

=== General election ===
==== Candidates ====
- Kenneth W. Clark, former mayor of Freehold Township (Republican)
- James J. Howard, incumbent representative since 1965 (Democratic)
- Thomas W. Palven (Independent)
- Joseph A. Roger (Anti-Monopoly)

===== Withdrew =====
- James Hasting Burmeister (Creativity-Science-Progress)
- Jerry Charles Burmeister (Integrity-Honesty-Representation)

==== Results ====
1974 U.S. House election
Party	Candidate	Votes	%	±%
Democratic	James J. Howard (incumbent)	105,979	68.86%	
Republican	Kenneth W. Clark	45,932	29.84%	
Independent	Joseph A. Rogers	1,177	0.76%	
Independent	thomas W. Palven	818	0.53%	
Total votes		153,906	100.00%	
Democratic hold		Swing	{{{swing}}}	

== District 4 ==
1974 New Jersey's 4th congressional district election
- November 5, 1974
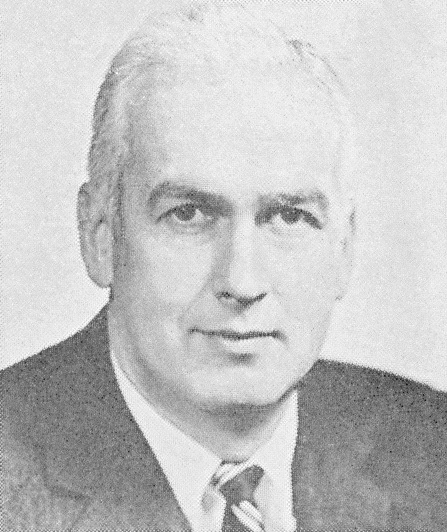

Nominee	Frank Thompson	Henry J. Keller
Party	Democratic	Republican
Popular vote	82,195	40,797
Percentage	66.8%	33.2%
U.S. Representative before election
Frank Thompson
Democratic
Elected U.S. Representative
Frank Thompson
Democratic

This district, in Central Jersey, consisted of parts of Burlington, Mercer, Middlesex, and Monmouth counties.

Democratic incumbent Frank Thompson was re-elected to a tenth term in office.

=== Democratic primary ===
==== Candidates ====
- David Crabiel, mayor of Milltown
- Frank Thompson, incumbent representative since 1955

==== Results ====
1974 Democratic primary
Party	Candidate	Votes	%
Democratic	Frank Thompson (incumbent)	11,317	65.12%
Democratic	David Crabiel	6,063	34.88%
Total votes		17,380	100.00%

=== Republican primary ===
==== Candidates ====
- Henry J. Keller, Hamilton Township teacher

==== Results ====
1974 Republican primary
Party	Candidate	Votes	%
Republican	Henry J. Keller	4,546	100.00%
Total votes		4,546	100.00%

=== General election ===
==== Candidates ====
- Henry J. Keller, Hamilton Township teacher (Republican)
- Frank Thompson, incumbent representative since 1955 (Democratic)

==== Results ====
1974 U.S. House election
Party	Candidate	Votes	%	±%
Democratic	Frank Thompson (incumbent)	82,195	66.83%	
Republican	Henry J. Keller	40,797	33.17%	
Total votes		122,992	100.00%	
Democratic hold		Swing	{{{swing}}}	

== District 5 ==
1974 New Jersey's 5th congressional district election
- November 5, 1974
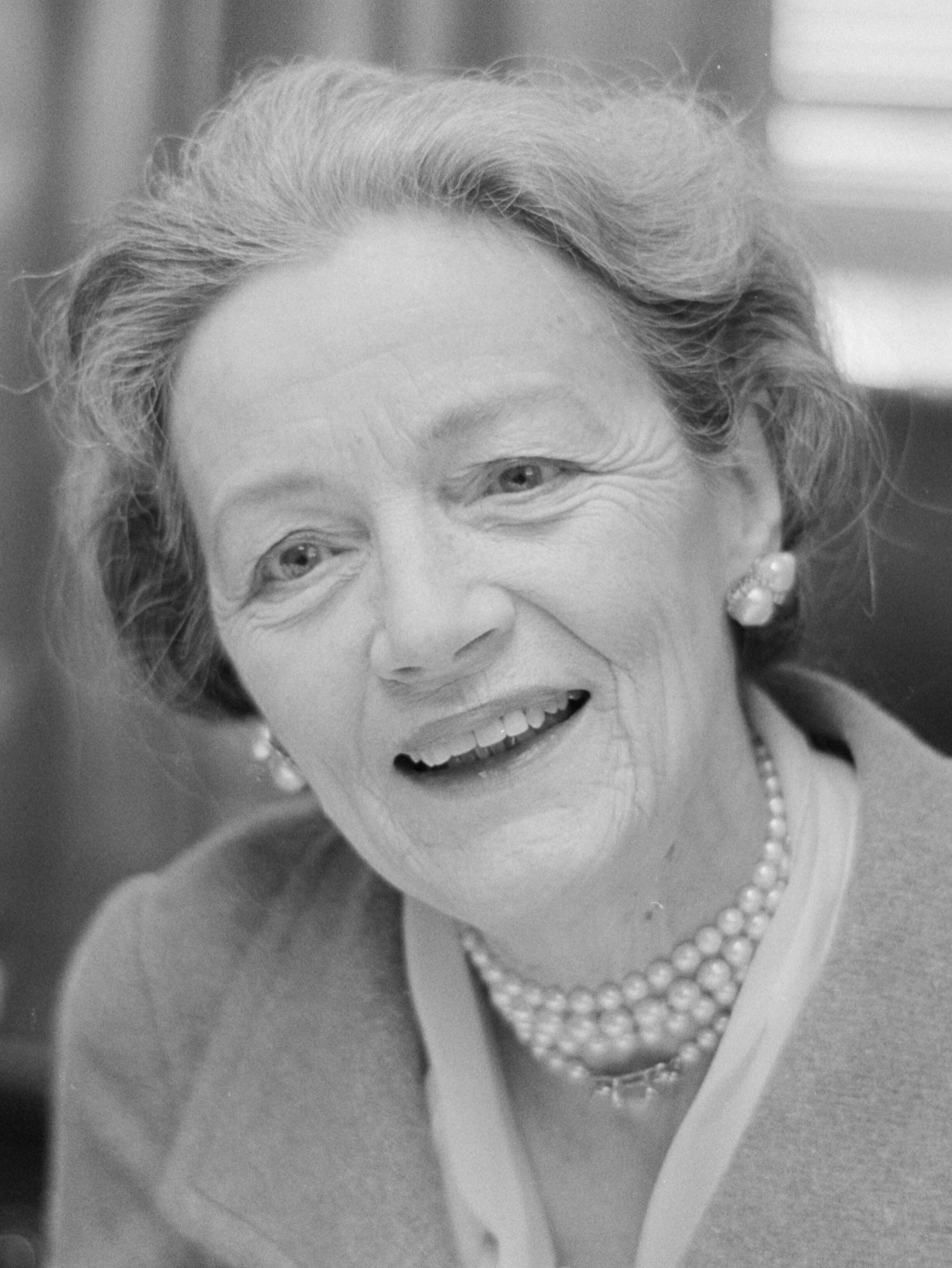

Nominee	Millicent Fenwick	Fred Bohen
Party	Republican	Democratic
Popular vote	81,498	66,380
Percentage	53.4%	43.5%
U.S. Representative before election
Peter Frelinghuysen Jr.
Republican
Elected U.S. Representative
Millicent Fenwick
Republican

This district included Somerset County and parts of Essex, Mercer, Middlesex, and Morris counties.

Republican incumbent Peter Frelinghuysen Jr. did not seek re-election to a thirteenth term in office. In the open race to succeed him, Millicent Fenwick defeated Frederick M. Bohen.

Fenwick narrowly won the Republican primary over Thomas Kean, the speaker of the General Assembly and future governor of New Jersey.

=== Republican primary ===
==== Candidates ====
- Millicent Fenwick, former director of the New Jersey Division of Consumer Affairs and assemblywoman from Bernardsville
- Charles E. Humiston, retired insurance executive
- Thomas Kean, assemblyman from Livingston, former speaker of the General Assembly, and son of former Representative Robert Kean

===== Declined =====
- Peter Frelinghuysen Jr., incumbent representative since 1953

==== Results ====
1974 Republican primary
Party	Candidate	Votes	%
Republican	Millicent Fenwick	12,509	47.78%
Republican	Thomas Kean	12,426	47.46%
Republican	Charles E. Humiston	1,248	4.77%
Total votes		26,183	100.00%

=== Democratic primary ===
==== Candidates ====
- Frederick M. Bohen, television executive and nominee for this district in 1972
- Gertrude Dubrovsky, Yiddish teacher at Princeton University
- Herbert Koransky, former director of the New Jersey Workmen's Compensation Commission and Somerset County public defender
- Paul J. Krebs, former Representative from Livingston
- John F. Lynch Jr., Morristown lawyer and U.S. Navy veteran
- Nina McCall, former president of the League of Women Voters of New Jersey

==== Results ====
1974 Democratic primary
Party	Candidate	Votes	%
Democratic	Frederick M. Bohen	8,002	48.94%
Democratic	Paul J. Krebs	2,891	17.68%
Democratic	John F. Lynch Jr.	2,346	14.35%
Democratic	Nina McCall	1,830	11.19%
Democratic	Herbert Koransky	735	4.50%
Democratic	Gertrude Dubrovsky	545	3.33%
Total votes		16,349	100.00%

=== General election ===
==== Candidates ====
- Frederick M. Bohen, television executive and nominee for this district in 1972 (Democratic)
- Millicent Fenwick, former director of the New Jersey Department of Consumer Affairs and assemblywoman from Bernardsville (Republican)
- John Giammarco (American Independent)
- Leonard F. Newton (New Leadership)

==== Results ====
1974 U.S. House election
Party	Candidate	Votes	%	±%
Republican	Millicent Fenwick	81,498	53.35%	
Democratic	Frederick M. Bohen	66,380	43.45%	
American Independent	John Giammarco	3,102	2.03%	
Independent	Leonard F. Newton	1,778	1.16%	
Total votes		152,758	100.00%	
Republican hold		Swing	{{{swing}}}	

== District 6 ==
1974 New Jersey's 6th congressional district election
- November 5, 1974
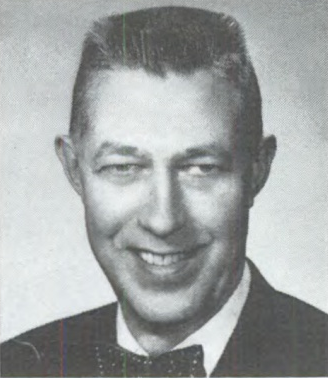

Nominee	Edwin B. Forsythe	Charles B. Yates
Party	Republican	Democratic
Popular vote	81,190	70,353
Percentage	52.5%	45.5%
U.S. Representative before election
Edwin B. Forsythe
Republican
Elected U.S. Representative
Edwin B. Forsythe
Republican

This district included parts of Burlington, Camden, and Ocean counties.

Republican incumbent Edwin B. Forsythe was re-elected to a fourth term in office.

=== Republican primary ===
==== Candidates ====
- Edwin B. Forsythe, incumbent representative from Moorestown since 1970
- Alexander Haak, Dover Township police commissioner

==== Results ====
1974 Republican primary
Party	Candidate	Votes	%
Republican	Edwin B. Forsythe (incumbent)	10,904	89.83%
Republican	Alexander Haak	1,234	10.17%
Total votes		12,138	100.00%

=== Democratic primary ===
==== Candidates ====
- Robert Wayne Bergman, Cherry Hill High School East guidance counselor
- Daniel J. Carluccio, Dover Township attorney and environmental activist
- Bernice Friedlander, Jackson Township resident
- Michael S. Keating, Camden County clerk
- Roy W. Myers, mayor of Palmyra
- Charles B. Yates, assemblyman from Edgewater Park

==== Results ====
1974 Democratic primary
Party	Candidate	Votes	%
Democratic	Charles B. Yates	5,772	30.43%
Democratic	Michael S. Keating	4,105	21.64%
Democratic	Daniel J. Carluccio	3,525	18.59%
Democratic	Roy W. Myers	2,166	11.42%
Democratic	Robert Wayne Bergman	1,949	10.28%
Democratic	Bernice Friedlander	1,449	7.64%
Total votes		18,966	100.00%

=== General election ===
==== Candidates ====
- Bernardo S. Doganiero, perennial candidate (Socialist Labor)
- Edwin B. Forsythe, incumbent representative from Moorestown since 1970 (Republican)
- John Valjean Mahalchik, political gadfly and perennial candidate (Regular Democracy)
- Joseph Alfons Nowak (Christian)
- Charles B. Yates, assemblyman from Edgewater Park (Democratic)

==== Results ====
1974 U.S. House election
Party	Candidate	Votes	%	±%
Republican	Edwin B. Forsythe (incumbent)	81,190	52.48%	
Democratic	Charles B. Yates	70,353	45.47%	
Independent	John V. Mahalchik	1,451	0.94%	
Socialist Labor	Bernardo S. Doganiero	1,135	0.73%	
Independent	Joseph Alfons Nowak	583	0.38%	
Total votes		154,712	100.00%	
Republican hold		Swing	{{{swing}}}	

== District 7 ==
1974 New Jersey's 7th congressional district election
- November 5, 1974
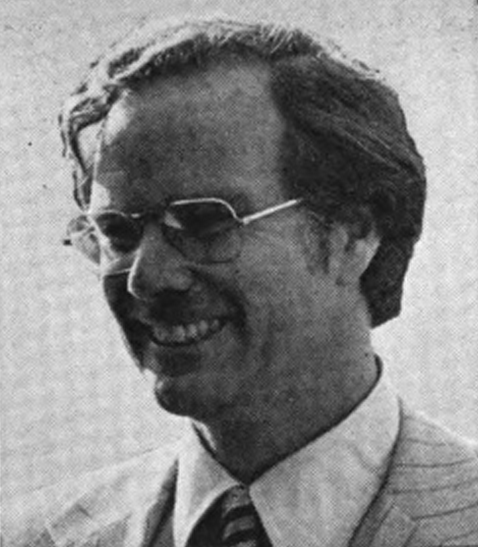

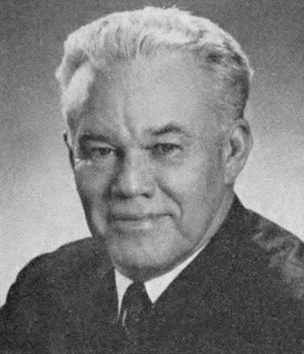

Nominee	Andrew Maguire	William B. Widnall	Milton Gralla
Party	Democratic	Republican	Independent
Popular vote	79,808	71,377	9,520
Percentage	49.7%	44.4%	5.9%
U.S. Representative before election
William B. Widnall
Republican
Elected U.S. Representative
Andrew Maguire
Democratic

This district included western parts of Bergen County.

Republican incumbent William B. Widnall ran for re-election to a fourteenth term in office, but he was defeated by Democratic nominee Andrew Maguire.

=== Republican primary ===
==== Candidates ====
- Thomas D. Dimartino, Glen Rock resident
- Clarence R. Hammerness, Teaneck resident
- Richard A. Joel, attorney and member of the Oradell borough council
- Martin E. Wendelken, Glen Rock businessman and independent candidate for this district in 1972
- William B. Widnall, incumbent representative since 1950
- Arthur Yeager, Westwood dentist and candidate for this district in 1966

==== Results ====
1974 Republican primary
Party	Candidate	Votes	%
Republican	William B. Widnall (incumbent)	10,245	63.92%
Republican	Martin E. Wendelken	2,389	14.91%
Republican	Richard A. Joel	1,976	12.33%
Republican	Arthur L. Yeager	629	3.92%
Republican	Thomas D. Dimartino	600	3.74%
Republican	Clarence R. Hammerness	189	1.18%
Total votes		16,028	100.00%

=== Democratic primary ===
==== Candidates ====
- Edward H. Hynes, assemblyman from Maywood
- Gill C. Job, Bergen County surrogate
- Andrew Maguire, Ford Foundation consultant, former advisor to the Department of State and U.S. delegation to the United Nations, and candidate for freeholder in 1972
- Ned J. Parsekian, former state senator and director of the New Jersey Motor Vehicle Commission
- Marjorie A. Wyngaarden, founder of the northern New Jersey division of the National Organization for Women and former chair of the Bergen County ACLU

==== Results ====
1974 Democratic primary
Party	Candidate	Votes	%
Democratic	Andrew Maguire	11,274	51.74%
Democratic	Ned J. Parsekian	5,488	25.18%
Democratic	Gill C. Job	2,462	11.30%
Democratic	Edward H. Hynes	2,009	9.22%
Democratic	Marjorie A. Wyngaarden	558	2.56%
Total votes		21,791	100.00%

=== General election ===
==== Candidates ====
- Milton Gralla, Teaneck publisher and philanthropist (Independent Citizens' Action)
- Andrew Maguire, Ford Foundation consultant, former advisor to the Department of State and U.S. delegation to the United Nations, and candidate for freeholder in 1972 (Democratic)
- William B. Widnall, incumbent representative since 1950 (Republican)

==== Results ====
1974 U.S. House election
Party	Candidate	Votes	%	±%
Democratic	Andrew Maguire	79,808	49.66%	
Republican	William B. Widnall (incumbent)	71,377	44.41%	
Independent	Milton Gralla	9,520	5.92%	
Total votes		160,705	100.00%	
Democratic gain from Republican		Swing	{{{swing}}}	

== District 8 ==
1974 New Jersey's 8th congressional district election
- November 5, 1974
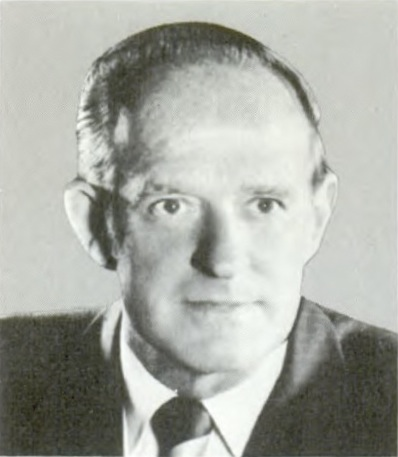

Nominee	Robert A. Roe	Herman Schmidt
Party	Democratic	Republican
Popular vote	83,724	27,839
Percentage	73.9%	24.6%
U.S. Representative before election
Robert A. Roe
Democratic
Elected U.S. Representative
Robert A. Roe
Democratic

This district included parts of Bergen and Passaic counties.

Democratic incumbent Robert Roe was re-elected to a fourth term in office.

=== Democratic primary ===
==== Candidates ====
- Valerie Mazzeo
- Robert A. Roe, incumbent representative from Wayne since 1969

==== Results ====
1974 Democratic primary
Party	Candidate	Votes	%
Democratic	Robert A. Roe (incumbent)	9,043	92.32%
Democratic	Valerie Mazzeo	752	7.68%
Total votes		9,795	100.00%

=== Republican primary ===
==== Candidates ====
- Herman Schmidt, Clifton resident

==== Results ====
1974 Republican primary
Party	Candidate	Votes	%
Republican	Herman Schmidt	5,334	100.00%
Total votes		5,334	100.00%

=== General election ===
==== Candidates ====
- Kenneth Kowalczyk (Socialist Labor)
- Robert A. Roe, incumbent representative from Wayne since 1969 (Democratic)
- Herman Schmidt, Clifton resident (Republican)

==== Results ====
1974 U.S. House election
Party	Candidate	Votes	%	±%
Democratic	Robert A. Roe (incumbent)	83,724	73.87%	
Republican	Herman Schmidt	27,839	24.57%	
Socialist Labor	Kenneth Kowalczyk	1,764	1.56%	
Total votes		113,327	100.00%	
Democratic hold		Swing	{{{swing}}}	

== District 9 ==
1974 New Jersey's 9th congressional district election
- November 5, 1974
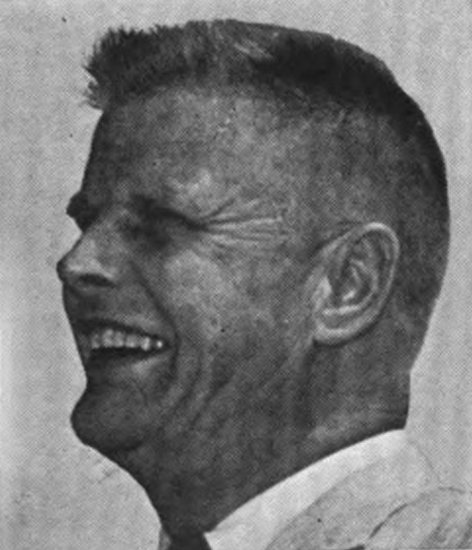

Nominee	Henry Helstoski	Harold A. Pareti
Party	Democratic	Republican
Popular vote	99,592	50,859
Percentage	64.5%	32.9%
U.S. Representative before election
Henry Helstoski
Democratic
Elected U.S. Representative
Henry Helstoski
Democratic

This district consisted of parts of Bergen and Hudson counties.

Democratic incumbent Henry Helstoski was re-elected to a sixth term in office.

=== Democratic primary ===
==== Candidates ====
- Henry Helstoski, incumbent representative since 1965 and candidate for governor in 1969
- Arthur E. Lavis, Park Ridge resident

=== Results ===
1974 Democratic primary
Party	Candidate	Votes	%
Democratic	Henry Helstoski (incumbent)	21,985	91.52%
Democratic	Arthur E. Lavis	2,037	8.48%
Total votes		24,022	100.00%

=== Republican primary ===
==== Candidates ====
- Harold A. Pareti, former assemblyman and mayor of Carlstadt

==== Results ====
1974 Republican primary
Party	Candidate	Votes	%
Republican	Harold A. Pareti	6,956	100.00%
Total votes		6,956	100.00%

=== General election ===
==== Candidates ====
- Robert W. Funsch (Independent)
- Henry Helstoski, incumbent representative since 1965 and candidate for governor in 1969 (Democratic)
- Harold A. Pareti, former assemblyman and mayor of Carlstadt (Republican)
- Herbert H. Shaw, perennial candidate (Politicians Are Crooks)

Helstoski and Pareti were classmates at East Rutherford High School in the graduating class of 1940.

==== Results ====
1974 U.S. House election
Party	Candidate	Votes	%	±%
Democratic	Henry Helstoski (incumbent)	99,592	64.52%	
Republican	Harold A. Pareti	50,859	32.95%	
Independent	Herbert H. Shaw	3,460	2.24%	
Independent	Robert W. Funsch	451	0.29%	
Total votes		154,362	100.00%	
Democratic hold		Swing	{{{swing}}}	

== District 10 ==
1974 New Jersey's 10th congressional district election
- November 5, 1974
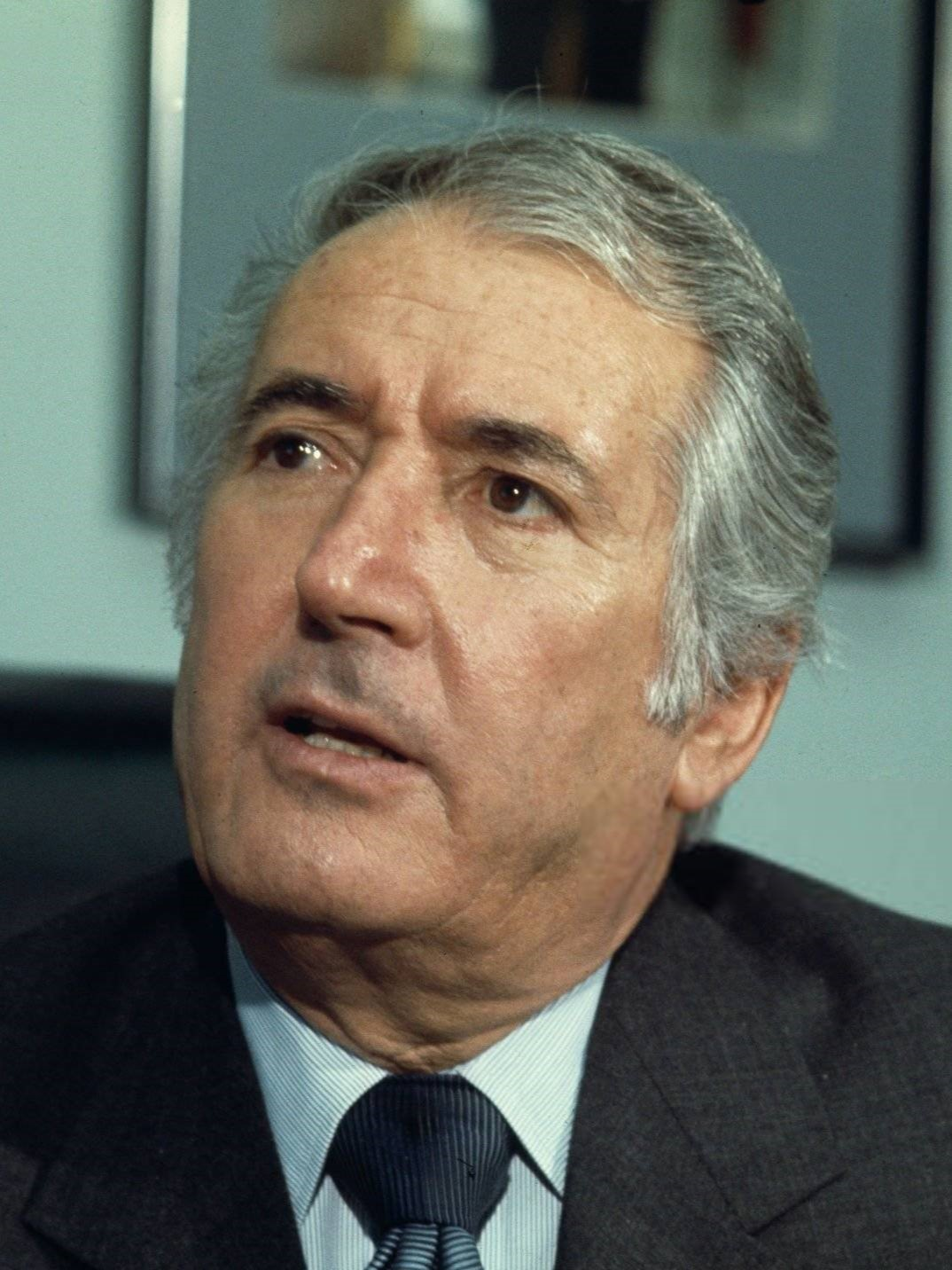

Nominee	Peter W. Rodino	John R. Taliaferro
Party	Democratic	Republican
Popular vote	53,094	9,936
Percentage	81.0%	15.2%
U.S. Representative before election
Peter W. Rodino
Democratic
Elected U.S. Representative
Peter W. Rodino
Democratic

The district included parts of Essex and Hudson counties.

Democratic incumbent Peter W. Rodino was re-elected to a fourteenth term in office.

=== Democratic primary ===
==== Candidates ====
- Michael Giordano
- Peter W. Rodino, incumbent representative since 1949

==== Results ====
1974 Democratic primary
Party	Candidate	Votes	%
Democratic	Peter W. Rodino (incumbent)	19,121	89.14%
Democratic	Michael Giordano	2,330	10.86%
Total votes		21,451	100.00%

=== Republican primary ===
==== Candidates ====
- John R. Taliaferro, candidate for General Assembly in 1973

==== Results ====
1974 Republican primary
Party	Candidate	Votes	%
Republican	John R. Taliaferro	2,169	100.00%
Total votes		2,169	100.00%

=== General election ===
==== Candidates ====
- Sandra Hill, Black nationalist and supporter of Amiri Baraka (Independent)
- Peter W. Rodino, incumbent representative since 1949 (Democratic)
- John R. Taliaferro, candidate for General Assembly in 1973 (Republican)

==== Results ====
1974 U.S. House election
Party	Candidate	Votes	%	±%
Democratic	Peter W. Rodino (incumbent)	53,094	81.01%	
Republican	John R. Taliaferro	9,936	15.16%	
Independent	Sandra Hill	2,508	3.83%	
Total votes		65,538	100.00%	
Democratic hold		Swing	{{{swing}}}	

== District 11 ==
1974 New Jersey's 11th congressional district election
- November 5, 1974
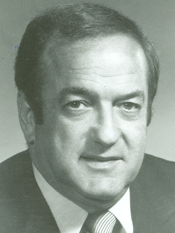

Nominee	Joseph Minish	William B. Grant
Party	Democratic	Republican
Popular vote	98,957	42,036
Percentage	69.2%	29.4%
U.S. Representative before election
Joseph Minish
Democratic
Elected U.S. Representative
Joseph Minish
Democratic

This district consisted of parts of Bergen, Essex, Passaic, and Union counties.

Democratic incumbent Joseph Minish was re-elected to a seventh term in office.

=== Democratic primary ===
==== Candidates ====
- Joseph Minish, incumbent representative from West Orange since 1963

==== Results ====
1974 Democratic primary
Party	Candidate	Votes	%
Democratic	Joseph Minish (incumbent)	13,182	100.00%
Total votes		13,182	100.00%

=== Republican primary ===
==== Candidates ====
- Richard B. Grant, former member of the Montclair township commission

==== Results ====
1974 Republican primary
Party	Candidate	Votes	%
Republican	Richard B. Grant	7,989	100.00%
Total votes		7,989	100.00%

=== General election ===
==== Candidates ====
- Robert Clement (Socialist Labor)
- Richard B. Grant, former member of the Montclair township commission (Republican)
- Joseph Minish, incumbent representative from West Orange since 1963 (Democratic)

==== Results ====
1974 U.S. House election
Party	Candidate	Votes	%	±%
Democratic	Joseph Minish (incumbent)	98,957	69.24%	
Republican	Richard B. Grant	42,036	29.41%	
Socialist Labor	Robert Clement	1,922	1.34%	
Total votes		142,915	100.00%	
Democratic hold		Swing	{{{swing}}}	

== District 12 ==
1974 New Jersey's 12th congressional district election
- November 5, 1974
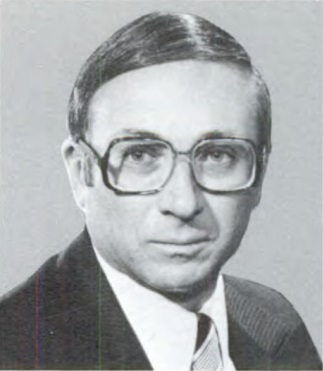

Nominee	Matt Rinaldo	Adam K. Levin
Party	Republican	Democratic
Popular vote	92,829	46,246
Percentage	65.0%	32.4%
U.S. Representative before election
Matt Rinaldo
Republican
Elected U.S. Representative
Matt Rinaldo
Republican

This district included parts of Union County.

Republican incumbent Matthew J. Rinaldo was re-elected to a second term in office.

=== Republican primary ===
==== Candidates ====
- Matt Rinaldo, incumbent representative from Union since 1973
- Lloyd J. Sherk

==== Results ====
1974 Republican primary
Party	Candidate	Votes	%
Republican	Matt Rinaldo (incumbent)	10,427	93.06%
Republican	Lloyd J. Sherk	777	6.94%
Total votes		11,204	100.00%

=== Democratic primary ===
==== Candidates ====
- A. Howard Freund, perennial candidate from Roselle Park
- Adam K. Levin, construction executive, University of Michigan Law School graduate and son of Philip J. Levin

==== Results ====
1974 Democratic primary
Party	Candidate	Votes	%
Democratic	Adam K. Levin	10,614	82.43%
Democratic	A. Howard Freund	2,262	17.57%
Total votes		12,876	100.00%

=== General election ===
==== Candidates ====
- Anthony Carbone, maintenance worker (Independent)
- Catherine O'Toole French, former New York Herald Tribune copy editor (Integrity in Government)
- Adam K. Levin, construction executive, University of Michigan Law School graduate and son of Philip J. Levin (Democratic)
- Matt Rinaldo, incumbent representative from Union since 1973 (Republican)
- Robert A. Steiner, certified public accountant (Independent)

==== Results ====
1974 U.S. House election
Party	Candidate	Votes	%	±%
Republican	Matt Rinaldo (incumbent)	92,829	64.99%	
Democratic	Adam K. Levin	46,246	32.38%	
Independent	Anthony Carbone	1,569	1.10%	
Independent	Catherine O'Toole French	1,182	0.83%	
Independent	Robert A. Steiner	1,017	0.71%	
Total votes		142,843	100.00%	
Republican hold		Swing	{{{swing}}}	

== District 13 ==
1974 New Jersey's 13th congressional district election
- November 5, 1974
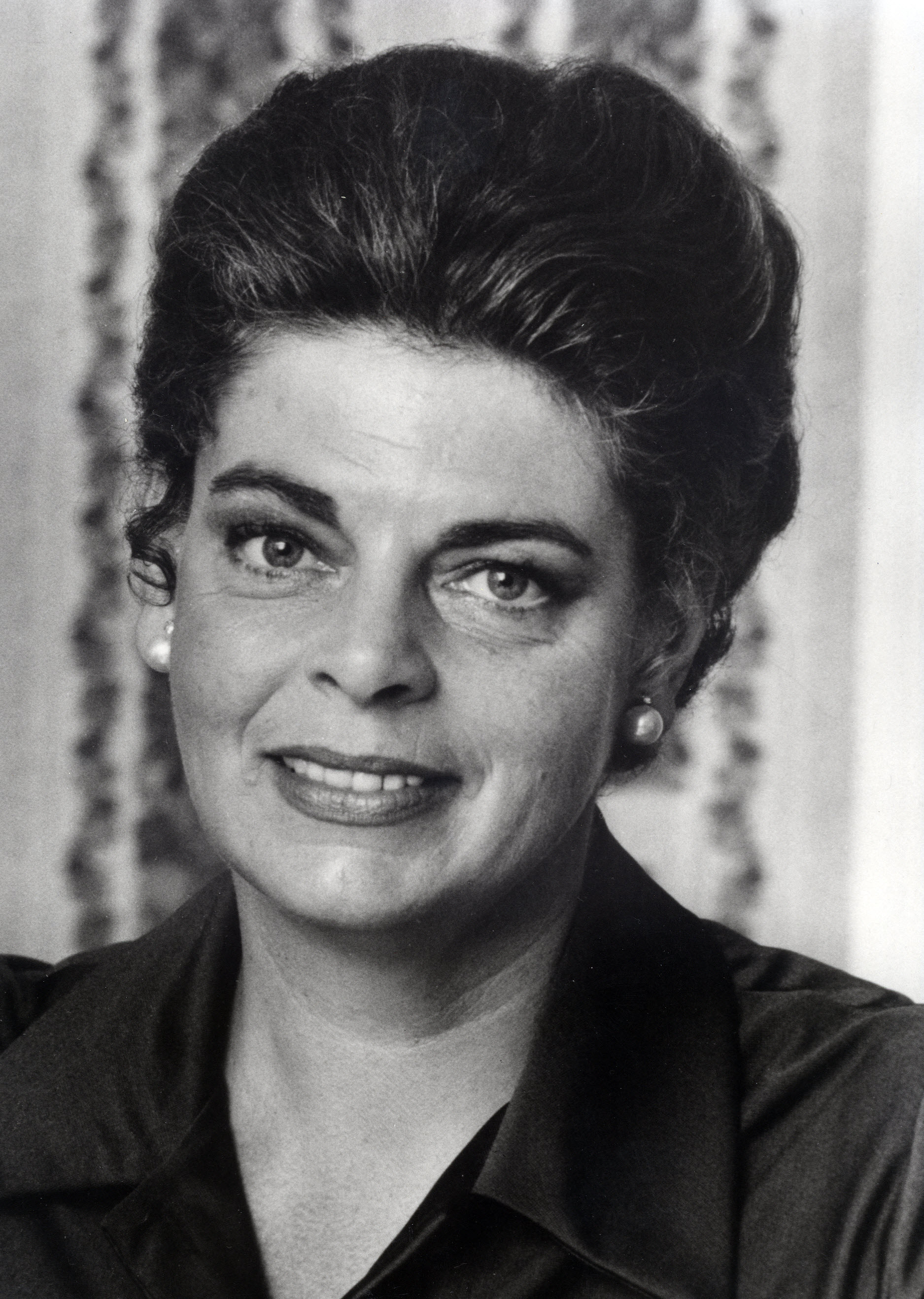

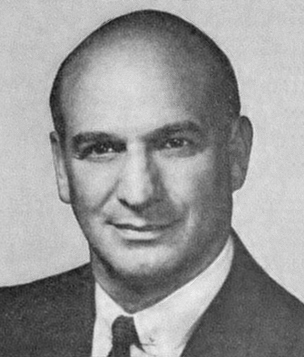
Nominee	Helen Stevenson Meyner	Joseph Maraziti
Party	Democratic	Republican
Popular vote	86,043	64,166
Percentage	57.3%	42.7%
U.S. Representative before election
Joseph Maraziti
Republican
Elected U.S. Representative
Helen Stevenson Meyner
Democratic

This sprawling district included Hunterdon, Sussex, and Warren counties and parts of Mercer and Morris counties.

Republican incumbent Joseph Maraziti ran for a second term in office but was defeated by Helen Stevenson Meyner, the former First Lady of New Jersey.

=== Republican primary ===
==== Candidates ====
- Joseph Maraziti, incumbent representative since 1973

==== Results ====
1974 Republican primary
Party	Candidate	Votes	%
Republican	Joseph Maraziti (incumbent)	18,667	100.00%
Total votes		18,667	100.00%

=== Democratic primary ===
==== Candidates ====
- Helen Stevenson Meyner, former First Lady of New Jersey and nominee for this district in 1972
- Joseph P. O'Doherty, disqualified candidate for this district in 1972
- Bernard Reiner, Fairleigh Dickinson University professor of government and politics
- Oscar W. Rittenhouse, former Hunterdon County prosecutor

===== Declined =====
- Bill Bradley, New York Knicks basketball player

==== Results ====
1974 Democratic primary
Party	Candidate	Votes	%
Democratic	Helen S. Meyner	8,259	47.35%
Democratic	Joseph P. O'Doherty	4,458	25.56%
Democratic	Oscar W. Rittenhouse	3,132	17.95%
Democratic	Bernard Reiner	1,595	9.14%
Total votes		17,444	100.00%

=== General election ===
==== Candidates ====
- Joseph Maraziti, incumbent representative since 1973 (Republican)
- Helen Stevenson Meyner, former First Lady of New Jersey and nominee for this district in 1972 (Democratic)

==== Results ====
1974 U.S. House election
Party	Candidate	Votes	%	±%
Democratic	Helen S. Meyner	86,043	57.28%	
Republican	Joseph Maraziti (incumbent)	64,166	42.72%	
Total votes		150,209	100.00%	
Democratic gain from Republican		Swing	{{{swing}}}	

== District 14 ==
1974 New Jersey's 14th congressional district election
- November 5, 1974
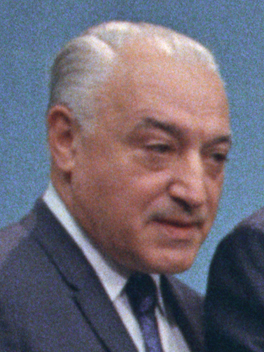

Nominee	Dominick V. Daniels	Claire J. Sheridan
Party	Democratic	Republican
Popular vote	85,438	17,231
Percentage	79.9%	16.1%
U.S. Representative before election
Dominick V. Daniels
Democratic
Elected U.S. Representative
Dominick V. Daniels
Democratic

This district included parts of Hudson County.

Incumbent representative Dominick V. Daniels was re-elected to a ninth term in office.

=== Democratic primary ===
==== Candidates ====
- Thomas Caslander
- Dominick V. Daniels, incumbent representative since 1959

==== Results ====
1974 Democratic primary
Party	Candidate	Votes	%
Democratic	Dominick V. Daniels (incumbent)	30,408	94.33%
Democratic	Thomas Caslander	1,827	5.67%
Total votes		32,235	100.00%

=== Republican primary ===
==== Candidates ====
- Franco Di Domenica
- Claire J. Sheridan, member of the Hudson County Charter Commission

==== Results ====
1974 Republican primary
Party	Candidate	Votes	%
Republican	Claire J. Sheridan	2,350	73.88%
Republican	Franco Di Domenica	831	26.12%
Total votes		3,181	100.00%

=== General election ===
==== Candidates ====
- John A. Alston (Good Neighbor)
- Dominick V. Daniels, incumbent representative since 1959 (Democratic)
- Claire J. Sheridan, member of the Hudson County Charter Commission (Republican)

==== Results ====
1974 U.S. House election
Party	Candidate	Votes	%	±%
Democratic	Dominick V. Daniels (incumbent)	85,438	79.90%	
Republican	Claire J. Sheridan	17,231	16.11%	
Independent	John A. Alston	4,266	3.99%	
Total votes		106,935	100.00%	
Democratic hold		Swing	{{{swing}}}	

== District 15 ==
1974 New Jersey's 15th congressional district election
- November 5, 1974
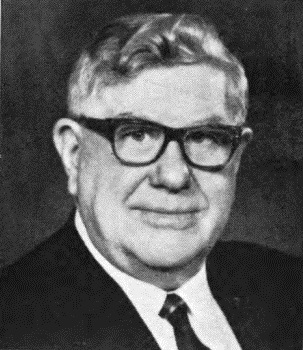

Nominee	Edward J. Patten	Ernest J. Hammesfahr
Party	Democratic	Republican
Popular vote	92,593	35,875
Percentage	71.0%	27.5%
U.S. Representative before election
Edward J. Patten
Democratic
Elected U.S. Representative
Edward J. Patten
Democratic

This district included parts of Middlesex and Union counties.

Democratic incumbent Edward J. Patten was re-elected to a seventh term in office.

=== Democratic primary ===
==== Candidates ====
- Edward J. Patten, incumbent representative since 1963

==== Results ====
1974 Democratic primary
Party	Candidate	Votes	%
Democratic	Edward J. Patten (incumbent)	16,698	100.00%
Total votes		16,698	100.00%

=== Republican primary ===
==== Candidates ====
- Ernest J. Hammesfahr, electrical engineer

==== Results ====
1974 Republican primary
Party	Candidate	Votes	%
Republican	Ernest J. Hammesfahr	3,148	100.00%
Total votes		3,148	100.00%

=== General election ===
==== Candidates ====
- Ernest J. Hammesfahr, electrical engineer (Republican)
- Edward J. Patten, incumbent representative since 1963 (Democratic)
- Paul M. Schiff, Rutgers University doctoral candidate (Communist)

==== Results ====
1974 U.S. House election
Party	Candidate	Votes	%	±%
Democratic	Edward J. Patten	92,593	71.02%	
Republican	Ernest J. Hammesfahr	35,875	27.52%	
Communist	Bruce E. Todd	1,899	0.14%	
Total votes		130,367	100.00%	
Democratic hold		Swing	{{{swing}}}	
