= 1982 United States House of Representatives elections in New Jersey =

- November 2, 1982

All 14 New Jersey seats to the United States House of Representatives
- Turnout: 62% (▼18pp)
	Majority party	Minority party
Party	Democratic	Republican
Last election	8	7
Seats won	9	5
Seat change	▲1	▼2
Popular vote	1,206,416	915,472
Percentage	56.2%	42.7%
Swing	▲8.2pp	▼7.2pp
Democratic
50–60%
60–70%
70–80%
Republican
50–60%
60–70%
70–80%

The 1982 United States House of Representatives elections in New Jersey were held on November 2, 1982, to determine who would represent the people of New Jersey in the United States House of Representatives. This election coincided with national elections for U.S. House and U.S. Senate. New Jersey had fourteen seats in the House, apportioned according to the 1980 United States census. Representatives are elected for two-year terms.

== Overview ==
1982 United States House of Representatives elections in New Jersey
Party	Votes	Percentage	Candidates	Seats	+/–
Democratic	1,206,416	56.21%	14	9	▲1
Republican	915,472	42.66%	14	5	▼2
Libertarian	15,413	0.72%	14	0	Steady
Citizens	1,740	0.08%	2	0	Steady
Constitution	651	0.03%	1	0	Steady
Socialist	436	0.02%	1	0	Steady
Socialist Labor	327	0.02%	1	0	Steady
Independents	5,635	0.26%	7	0	Steady
Totals	2,146,090	100.00%	54	14	Steady

== Background ==
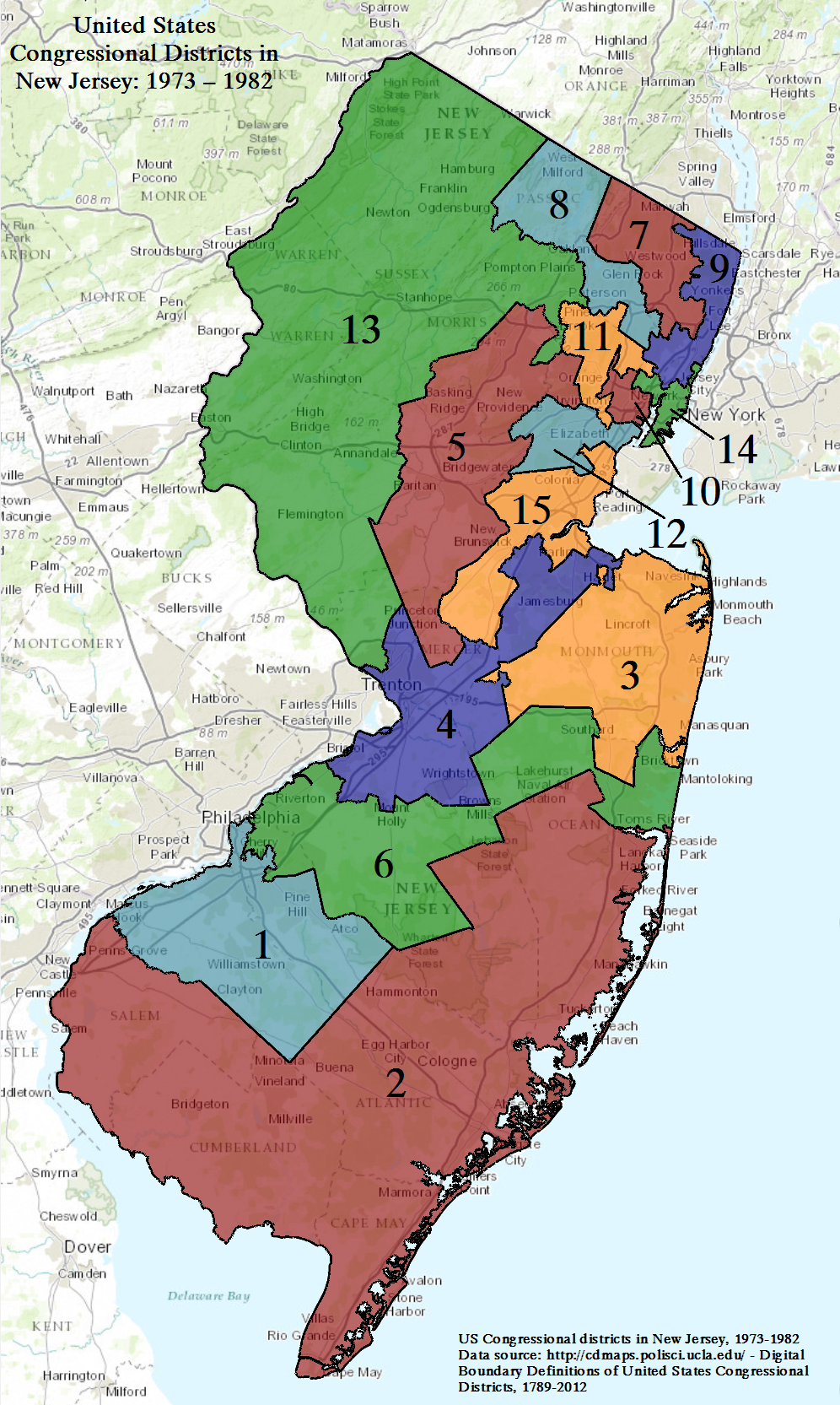
1973–82

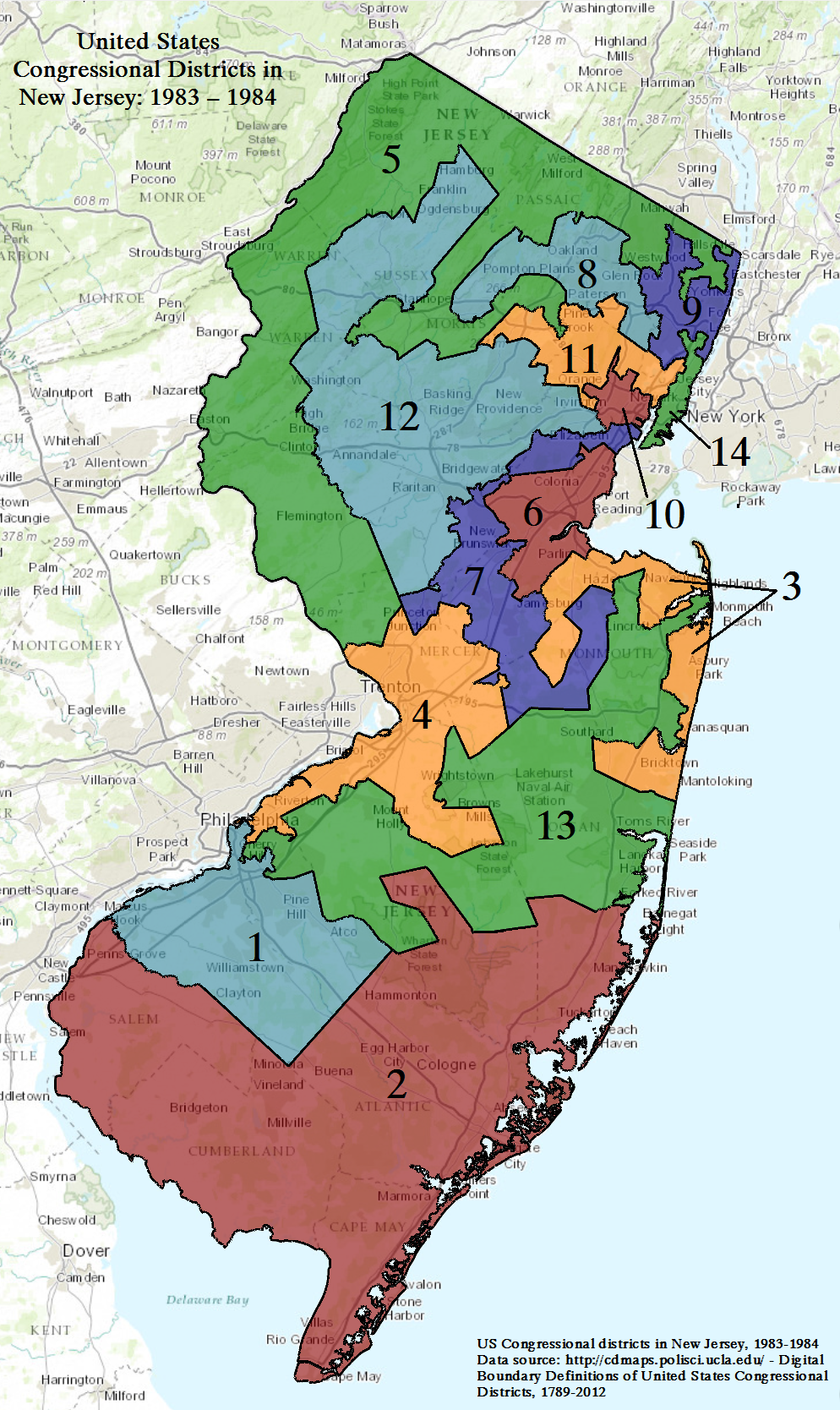
1983–84

New Jersey congressional districts before (left) and after (right) the 1980 census decennial redistricting

Following the 1980 United States census, the New Jersey Legislature had conducted decennial redistricting. The resulting map, which was considered heavily favorable to the Democratic Party and approved by Democratic governor Brendan Byrne just before he left office, was used for the 1982 elections. Although the seven Republican incumbents challenged the map in court (and would eventually succeed when the map was ruled unconstitutional by the Supreme Court of the United States in Karcher v. Daggett), the Democratic map was in effect for the 1982 elections.

The Republicans' lawsuit claimed the new map included several configurations which were "'outrageously designed expressly for political purposes.'' The new districts were dramatically less compact than their predecessors and more favorable to the Democratic Party, with two open districts favoring the Democrats, two districts pitting Republican incumbents against each other, and one district pitting a first-term Republican against a veteran member of Democratic Party leadership.

The hometowns of two Republican incumbents were combined in each of the fifth (Jim Courter of Hackettstown and Marge Roukema of Ridgewood) and twelfth districts (Millicent Fenwick of Bernardsville and Matt Rinaldo of Union) in an effort to create primary infighting. However, the potential primary challenges were avoided when Fenwick ran for the United States Senate and Rinaldo ran for the open seventh district, allowing Courter to run for the now-vacant twelfth district and avoid a competitive primary against Roukema.

Separately, Old Bridge, the hometown of first-term representative Chris Smith, was relocated to the third district, which was represented by longtime Democratic incumbent James J. Howard and was made considerably more Democratic. The new fourth district, which Smith had won against incumbent Frank Thompson in an upset in 1980 after Thompson was indicted on bribery charges, was dramatically more Democratic than its already-Democratic predecessor. Rather than challenge Howard, Smith opted to run for re-election in his own district.

== District 1 ==
1982 New Jersey's 1st congressional district election
- November 2, 1982
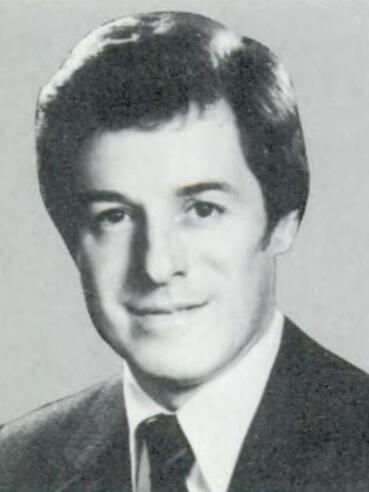

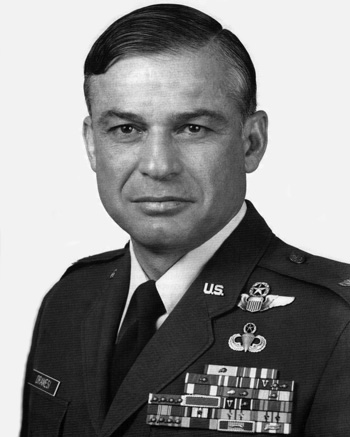
Nominee	James Florio	John A. Dramesi
Party	Democratic	Republican
Popular vote	110,570	39,501
Percentage	73.3%	26.2%
U.S. Representative before election
James Florio
Democratic
Elected U.S. Representative
James Florio
Democratic

Incumbent Democrat James Florio won. The district included Gloucester County and parts of Camden County.

=== Democratic primary ===
==== Candidates ====
- James Florio, incumbent Representative since 1975

==== Results ====
1982 Democratic primary
Party	Candidate	Votes	%
Democratic	James Florio (incumbent)	32,016	100.00%
Total votes		32,016	100.00%

=== Republican primary ===
==== Candidates ====
- John A. Dramesi, retired U.S. Air Force colonel and former prisoner of war
- Scott L. Sibert, nominee for this district in 1980

==== Results ====
1982 Republican primary
Party	Candidate	Votes	%
Republican	John A. Dramesi	8,359	63.90%
Republican	Scott L. Sibert	4,722	36.10%
Total votes		13,081	100.00%

=== General election ===
==== Candidates ====
- John A. Dramesi, retired U.S. Air Force colonel and former prisoner of war (Republican)
- James Florio, incumbent Representative since 1975 (Republican)
- Patrick J. McCann (Socialist Labor)
- Jerry Zeldin (Libertarian)

==== Results ====
1982 U.S. House election
Party	Candidate	Votes	%	±%
Democratic	James Florio (incumbent)	110,570	73.28%	
Republican	John A. Dramesi	39,501	26.18%	
Libertarian	Jerry Zeldin	493	0.33%	
Socialist Labor	Patrick J. McCann	327	0.22%	
Total votes		150,891	100.00%	
Democratic hold		Swing	{{{swing}}}	

== District 2 ==
1982 New Jersey's 2nd congressional district election
- November 2, 1982
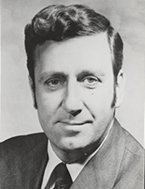

Nominee	William J. Hughes	John Mahoney
Party	Democratic	Republican
Popular vote	102,826	47,069
Percentage	68.0%	31.1%
U.S. Representative before election
William J. Hughes
Democratic
Elected U.S. Representative
William J. Hughes
Democratic

Incumbent William J. Hughes won. This district, the largest in South Jersey, included all of Atlantic, Cape May, Cumberland, and Salem counties and parts of Burlington and Ocean counties.

=== Democratic primary ===
==== Candidates ====
- William J. Hughes, incumbent Representative since 1975

==== Results ====
1982 Democratic primary
Party	Candidate	Votes	%
Democratic	William J. Hughes (incumbent)	15,360	100.00%
Total votes		15,360	100.00%

=== Republican primary ===
==== Candidates ====
- John J. Mahoney, teacher and candidate for this district in 1980

==== Results ====
1982 Republican primary
Party	Candidate	Votes	%
Republican	John J. Mahoney	24,856	100.00%
Total votes		24,856	100.00%

=== General election ===
==== Candidates ====
- John J. Mahoney, teacher and candidate for this district in 1980 (Republican)
- William J. Hughes, incumbent Representative since 1975 (Democratic)

==== Results ====
1982 U.S. House election
Party	Candidate	Votes	%	±%
Democratic	William J. Hughes (incumbent)	102,826	68.04%	
Republican	John J. Mahoney	47,069	31.14%	
Libertarian	Bruce Powers	1,233	0.82%	
Total votes		151,128	100.00%	
Democratic hold		Swing	{{{swing}}}	

== District 3 ==
1982 New Jersey's 3rd congressional district election
- November 2, 1982
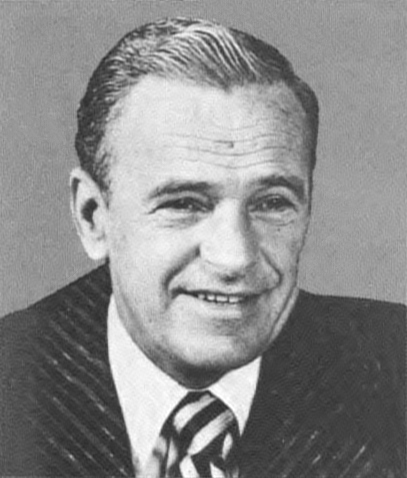

Nominee	James J. Howard	Marie Sheehan Muhler
Party	Democratic	Republican
Popular vote	104,055	60,515
Percentage	62.3%	36.2%
U.S. Representative before election
James J. Howard
Democratic
Elected U.S. Representative
James J. Howard
Democratic

Incumbent Democrat James J. Howard won.

This district included parts of Monmouth, Middlesex, and Ocean counties.

=== Democratic primary ===
==== Candidates ====
- James J. Howard, incumbent Representative since 1965

==== Results ====
1982 Democratic primary
Party	Candidate	Votes	%
Democratic	James J. Howard (incumbent)	18,628	100.00%
Total votes		18,628	100.00%

=== Republican primary ===
==== Candidates ====
- Marie Sheehan Muhler, assemblywoman from Marlboro and nominee for this district in 1980
- I. Richard Feingold, Holmdel optometrist

==== Declined ====
- Chris Smith, incumbent Representative from Old Bridge since 1981 (ran in 4th district)

==== Results ====
1982 Republican primary
Party	Candidate	Votes	%
Republican	Marie Sheehan Muhler	20,990	87.61%
Republican	I. Richard Feingold	2,969	12.39%
Total votes		23,959	100.00%

=== General election ===
==== Candidates ====
- Lawrence D. Erickson (Socialist)
- Lee A. Gesner Jr. (Libertarian)
- Joseph B. Hawley (Independent)
- James J. Howard, incumbent Representative since 1965 (Democratic)
- John Kinnevy III (Citizens)
- Marie Sheehan Muhler, assemblywoman from Marlboro and nominee for this district in 1980 (Republican)

==== Results ====
1982 U.S. House election
Party	Candidate	Votes	%	±%
Democratic	James J. Howard (incumbent)	104,055	62.31%	
Republican	Marie Sheehan Muhler	60,515	36.24%	
Citizens	John Kinnevy III	785	0.47%	
Libertarian	Lee A. Gesner Jr.	701	0.42%	
Independent	Joseph B. Hawley	504	0.30%	
Socialist	Lawrence D. Erickson	436	0.26%	
Total votes		166,996	100.00%	
Democratic hold		Swing	{{{swing}}}	

== District 4 ==
1982 New Jersey's 4th congressional district election
- November 2, 1982
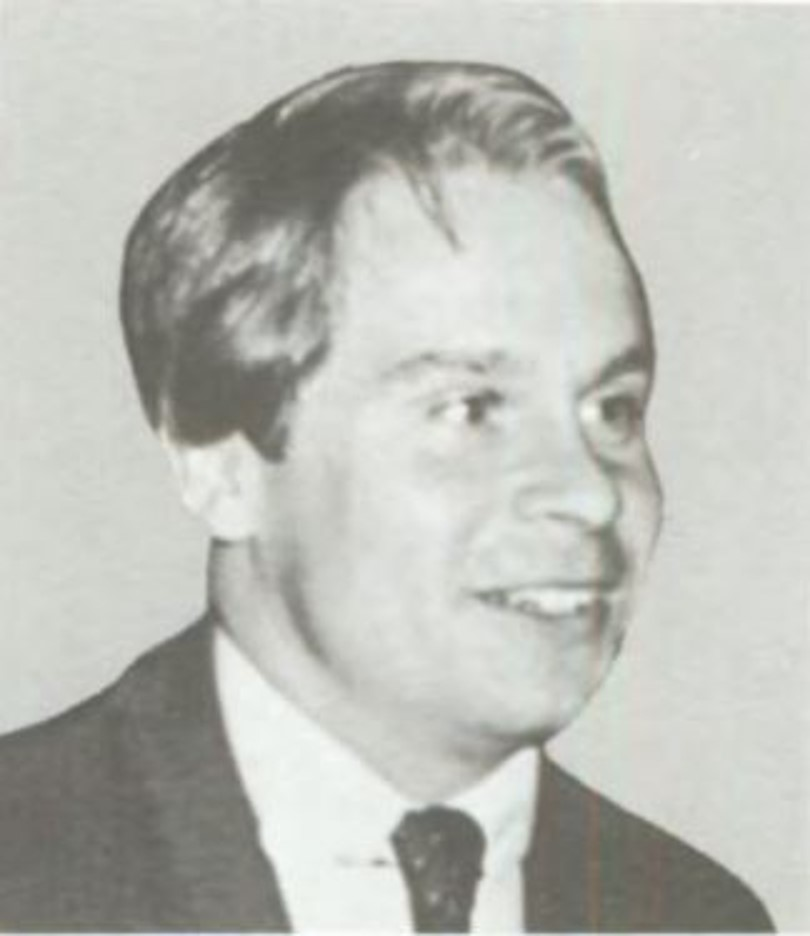

Nominee	Chris Smith	Joseph P. Merlino
Party	Republican	Democratic
Popular vote	85,660	75,658
Percentage	52.7%	46.5%
U.S. Representative before election
Chris Smith
Republican
Elected U.S. Representative
Chris Smith
Republican

Incumbent Republican Chris Smith won. This district, in Central Jersey, consisted of parts of Burlington, Camden, Mercer, Middlesex, and Monmouth counties.

=== Republican primary ===
==== Candidates ====
- Chris Smith, incumbent Representative since 1981

==== Results ====
1982 Republican primary
Party	Candidate	Votes	%
Republican	Chris Smith (incumbent)	15,295	100.00%
Total votes		15,295	100.00%

=== Democratic primary ===
==== Candidates ====
- Joseph P. Merlino, former New Jersey Senate president and candidate for governor in 1981
- Craig W. Yates, Edgewater Park millionaire industrialist and brother of Charles B. Yates

==== Results ====
1982 Democratic primary
Party	Candidate	Votes	%
Democratic	Joseph P. Merlino	19,453	58.05%
Democratic	Craig W. Yates	14,058	41.95%
Total votes		33,511	100.00%

=== General election ===
==== Candidates ====
- Eugene Allan Creech (World Federalist)
- Bill Harris (Libertarian)
- Joseph P. Merlino, former president of the New Jersey Senate and candidate for governor in 1981 (Democratic)
- Paul B. Rizzo (Independent)
- Chris Smith, incumbent Representative since 1981 (Republican)

==== Results ====
1982 U.S. House election
Party	Candidate	Votes	%	±%
Republican	Chris Smith (incumbent)	85,660	52.68%	
Democratic	Joseph P. Merlino	75,658	46.53%	
Libertarian	Bill Harris	662	0.41%	
Independent	Paul B. Rizzo	374	0.23%	
Independent	Eugene Allan Creech	241	0.15%	
Total votes		162,595	100.00%	
Turnout		132,360	45.35%	
Republican hold		Swing	{{{swing}}}	

== District 5 ==
1982 New Jersey's 5th congressional district election
- November 2, 1982
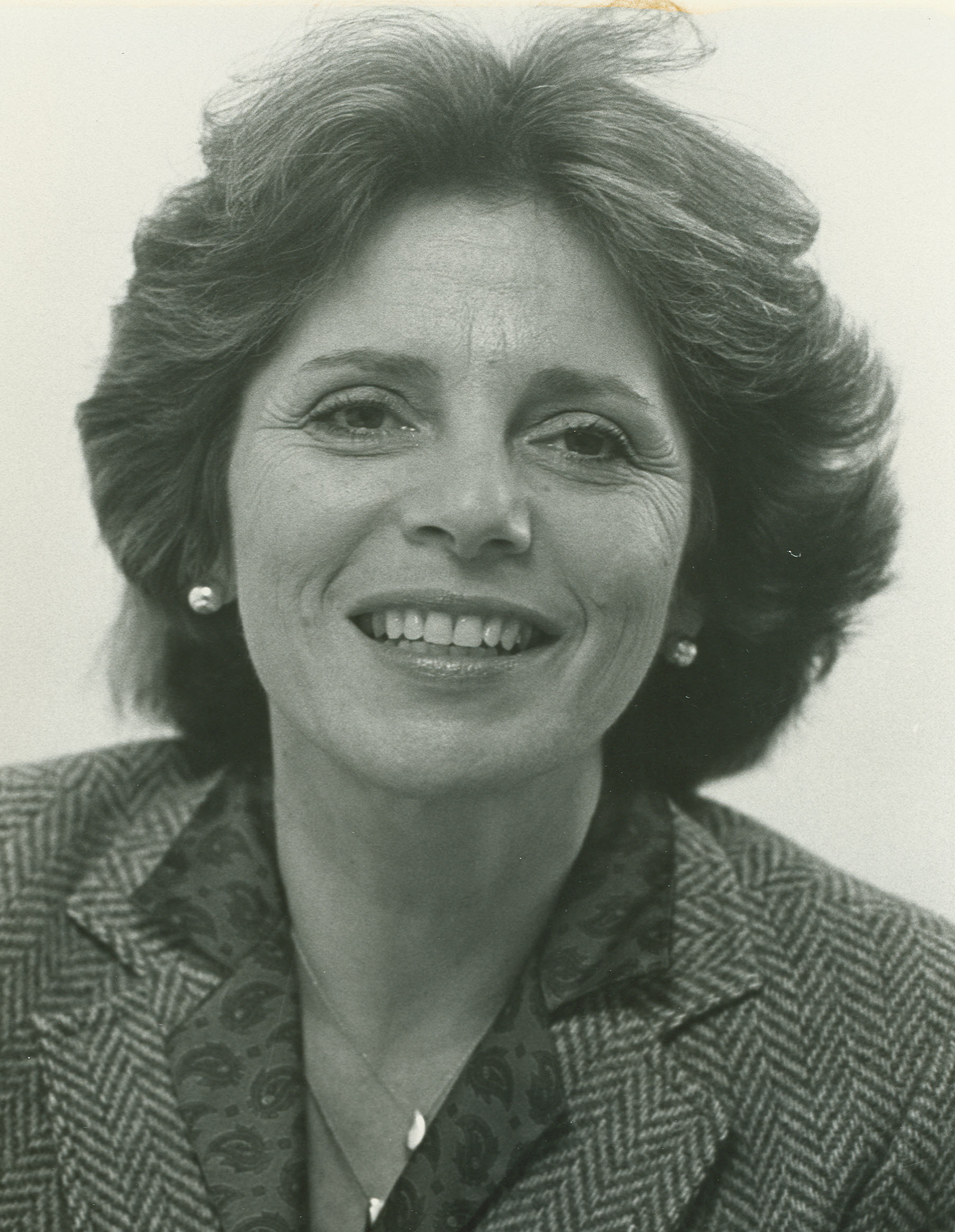

Nominee	Marge Roukema	Fritz Cammerzell
Party	Republican	Democratic
Popular vote	104,695	53,659
Percentage	65.3%	33.5%
U.S. Representative before election
Marge Roukema
Republican
Elected U.S. Representative
Marge Roukema
Republican

Incumbent Marge Roukema won. This district included parts of Bergen, Passaic, and Sussex counties.

=== Background ===
The 5th district was redrawn to pit Republican incumbents Jim Courter and Marge Roukema against each other. However, Courter opted to run in the 12th district, which had been vacated by Millicent Fenwick and Matt Rinaldo.

=== Republican primary ===
==== Candidates ====
- Marge Roukema, incumbent Representative from Ridgewood since 1981
- John Philip Scollo, Towaco attorney

===== Declined =====
- Jim Courter, incumbent Representative from Hackettstown since 1979 (ran in 12th district)

==== Results ====
1982 Republican primary
Party	Candidate	Votes	%
Republican	Marge Roukema (incumbent)	29,377	81.75%
Republican	John P. Scollo	6,559	18.25%
Total votes		35,936	100.00%

=== Democratic primary ===
==== Candidates ====
- Fritz Cammerzell, real estate attorney
- Ray Rollinson, perennial candidate

==== Results ====
1982 Democratic primary
Party	Candidate	Votes	%
Democratic	Fritz Cammerzell	7,516	53.20%
Democratic	Ray Rollinson	6,611	47.80%
Total votes		14,127	100.00%

=== General election ===
==== Candidates ====
- Fritz Cammerzell (Democratic)
- Marge Roukema, incumbent Representative from Ridgewood since 1981 (Republican)
- William J. Zelko Jr. (Libertarian)

==== Results ====
1982 U.S. House election
Party	Candidate	Votes	%	±%
Republican	Marge Roukema (incumbent)	104,695	65.29%	
Democratic	Fritz Cammerzell	53,659	33.46%	
Libertarian	William J. Zelko Jr.	2,004	1.25%	
Total votes		160,358	100.00%	
Turnout		134,220	46.32%	
Republican hold		Swing	{{{swing}}}	

== District 6 ==
1982 New Jersey's 6th congressional district election
- November 2, 1982
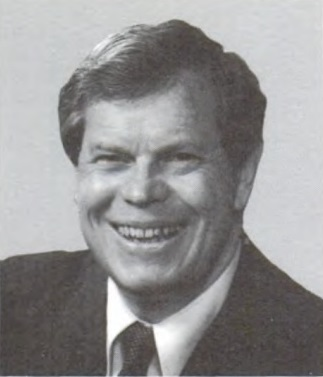

Nominee	Bernard J. Dwyer	Bertram Buckler
Party	Democratic	Republican
Popular vote	100,419	46,095
Percentage	68.1%	31.3%
U.S. Representative before election
Bernard J. Dwyer
Democratic
Elected U.S. Representative
Bernard J. Dwyer
Democratic

Incumbent Democrat Bernard J. Dwyer won. This district included parts of Middlesex and Union counties.

=== Democratic primary ===
==== Candidates ====
- Bernard J. Dwyer, incumbent Representative from Edison since 1981

==== Results ====
1982 Democratic primary
Party	Candidate	Votes	%
Democratic	Bernard J. Dwyer (incumbent)	29,644	100.00%
Total votes		29,644	100.00%

=== Republican primary ===
==== Candidates ====
- Bertram L. Buckler, candidate for New Jersey General Assembly in 1981

==== Results ====
1982 Republican primary
Party	Candidate	Votes	%
Republican	Bertram L. Buckler	8,568	100.00%
Total votes		8,568	100.00%

=== General election ===
==== Candidates ====
- Bernard Buckler, candidate for New Jersey General Assembly in 1981 (Republican)
- Bernard J. Dwyer, incumbent Representative from Edison since 1981 (Democratic)
- Charles M. Hart (Libertarian)

==== Results ====
1982 U.S. House election
Party	Candidate	Votes	%	±%
Democratic	Bernard J. Dwyer (incumbent)	100,419	68.11%	
Republican	Bertram Buckler	46,095	31.26%	
Libertarian	Charles M. Hart	920	0.62%	
Total votes		147,434	100.00%	
Democratic hold		Swing	{{{swing}}}	

== District 7 ==
1982 New Jersey's 7th congressional district election
- November 2, 1982
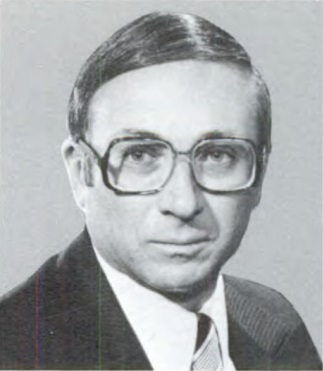

Nominee	Matt Rinaldo	Adam K. Levin
Party	Republican	Democratic
Popular vote	91,837	70,978
Percentage	56.0%	43.3%
U.S. Representative before election
Matt Rinaldo
Republican
Elected U.S. Representative
Matt Rinaldo
Republican

Incumbent Matt Rinaldo won. This district included parts of Mercer, Middlesex, Monmouth, Somerset, and Union counties.

=== Background ===
The new "fishhook" design of the district connected disparate communities in Central Jersey including Elizabeth, Princeton and Marlboro. Adam K. Levin, the former New Jersey Director of Consumer Affairs and son of wealthy real estate developer and investor Philip J. Levin, had opposed Rinaldo in 1974 and lost by a large margin. To secure a winnable district in 1982, Levin donated enormous sums of money to Democratic candidates for the New Jersey legislature in 1981.

Although the new district did not have an incumbent, because Rinaldo's hometown of Union had been relocated to the 12th district, Rinaldo chose to run for re-election in the 7th, which included most of Union County, against Levin.

=== Republican primary ===
==== Candidates ====
- Matt Rinaldo, incumbent Representative from Union since 1973

==== Results ====
1982 Republican primary
Party	Candidate	Votes	%
Republican	Matt Rinaldo (incumbent)	21,698	100.00%
Total votes		21,698	100.00%

=== Democratic primary ===
==== Candidates ====
- Adam K. Levin, former New Jersey Director of Consumer Affairs and son of Philip J. Levin

===== Withdrew =====
- Barbara Boggs Sigmund, Mercer County Freeholder and daughter of Hale Boggs and Lindy Boggs (ran for U.S. Senate)

==== Campaign ====
Boggs Sigmund dropped out of the race just before the filing deadline, choosing instead to run in the crowded Democratic primary for United States Senate. She publicly stated that she had been pressured to switch races by a number of county leaders and Democratic incumbents Robert Roe, James Howard and Bill Hughes.

==== Results ====
1982 Democratic primary
Party	Candidate	Votes	%
Democratic	Adam K. Levin	21,014	100.00%
Total votes		21,014	100.00%

=== General election ===
==== Candidates ====
- Adam K. Levin, former New Jersey Director of Consumer Affairs and son of Philip J. Levin (Democratic)
- Matt Rinaldo, incumbent Representative from Union since 1973 (Republican)
- Donald B. Siano (Libertarian)

==== Campaign ====
Rinaldo hired Roger Stone to serve as his campaign strategist.

==== Results ====
1982 U.S. House election
Party	Candidate	Votes	%	±%
Republican	Matt Rinaldo (incumbent)	91,837	55.96%	
Democratic	Adam K. Levin	70,978	43.25%	
Libertarian	Donald B. Siano	1,294	0.79%	
Total votes		164,109	100.00%	
Republican hold		Swing	{{{swing}}}	

=== Aftermath ===
Despite winning the new district, Rinaldo did not relocate from Union Township and kept both his home and district office there. Union Township was restored to the district in 1984, following the Supreme Court decision in Karcher v. Daggett.

== District 8 ==
1982 New Jersey's 8th congressional district election
- November 2, 1982
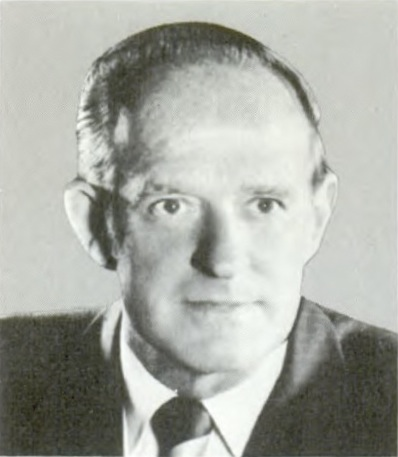

Nominee	Robert A. Roe	Norm Robertson
Party	Democratic	Republican
Popular vote	118,793	69,973
Percentage	62.7%	36.9%
U.S. Representative before election
Robert A. Roe
Democratic
Elected U.S. Representative
Robert A. Roe
Democratic

Incumbent Robert Roe won. This district included parts of Bergen, Morris, and Passaic counties.

=== Democratic primary ===
==== Candidates ====
- Robert A. Roe, incumbent Representative from Wayne since 1969

==== Results ====
1982 Democratic primary
Party	Candidate	Votes	%
Democratic	Robert A. Roe (incumbent)	18,202	100.00%
Total votes		18,202	100.00%

=== Republican primary ===
==== Candidates ====
- Norm Robertson, Passaic County Freeholder

==== Results ====
1982 Republican primary
Party	Candidate	Votes	%
Republican	Norman M. Robertson	14,970	100.00%
Total votes		14,970	100.00%

=== General election ===
==== Candidates ====
- Sidney J. Pope (Libertarian)
- Norm Robertson, Passaic County Freeholder (Republican)
- Robert A. Roe, incumbent Representative from Wayne since 1969 (Democratic)

==== Results ====
1982 U.S. House election
Party	Candidate	Votes	%	±%
Democratic	Robert A. Roe (incumbent)	89,980	70.69%	
Republican	Norman M. Robertson	36,317	28.53%	
Libertarian	Sidney J. Pope	1,000	0.79%	
Total votes		127,297	100.00%	
Democratic hold		Swing	{{{swing}}}	

== District 9 ==
1982 New Jersey's 9th congressional district election
- November 2, 1982
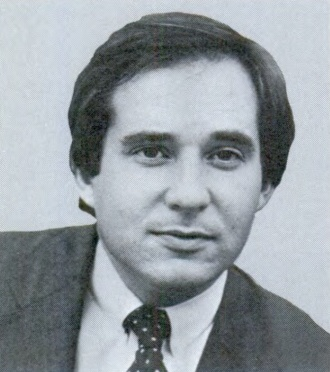

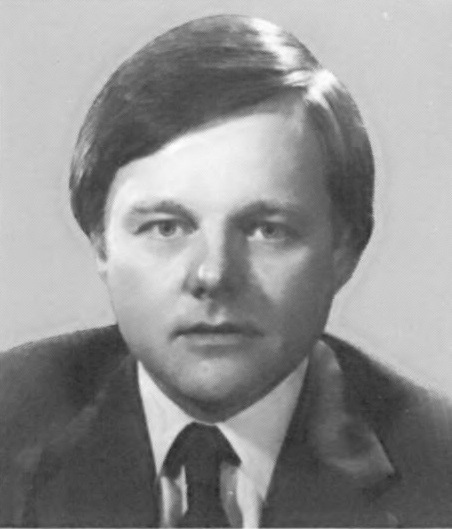
Nominee	Bob Torricelli	Harold C. Hollenbeck
Party	Democratic	Republican
Popular vote	99,090	86,022
Percentage	53.0%	46.0%
U.S. Representative before election
Harold C. Hollenbeck
Republican
Elected U.S. Representative
Bob Torricelli
Democratic

Incumbent Democrat Bob Torricelli won. This district consisted of parts of Bergen County.

=== Republican primary ===
==== Candidates ====
- Emil Bernard
- Harold Hollenbeck, incumbent Representative from East Rutherford since 1977

==== Results ====
1982 Republican primary
Party	Candidate	Votes	%
Republican	Harold C. Hollenbeck (incumbent)	20,160	89.65%
Republican	Emil Bernard	2,328	10.35%
Total votes		22,488	100.00%

=== Democratic primary ===
==== Candidates ====
- Jacqueline Stovall, founding member of Bergen Blacks for Action in Politics and 1980 Democratic National Convention delegate
- Bob Torricelli, former aide to governor Brendan Byrne and advisor to the Jimmy Carter 1980 presidential campaign

==== Withdrew ====
- Stephen M. Bunda, doctoral student, Bergen County political consultant, and candidate for this district in 1980

==== Results ====
1982 Democratic primary
Party	Candidate	Votes	%
Democratic	Bob Torricelli	18,612	76.73%
Democratic	Jacqueline Stovall	5,643	23.27%
Total votes		24,255	100.00%

=== General election ===
==== Candidates ====
- Harold Hollenbeck, incumbent Representative from East Rutherford since 1977 (Republican)
- Robert Shapiro (Libertarian)
- Bob Torricelli, former aide to governor Brendan Byrne and advisor to the Jimmy Carter 1980 presidential campaign (Democratic)

==== Results ====
1982 U.S. House election
Party	Candidate	Votes	%	±%
Democratic	Bob Torricelli	99,090	53.02%	
Republican	Harold C. Hollenbeck (incumbent)	86,022	46.03%	
Libertarian	Robert Shapiro	1,767	0.95%	
Total votes		186,879	100.00%	
Democratic hold		Swing	{{{swing}}}	

== District 10 ==
1982 New Jersey's 10th congressional district election
- November 2, 1982
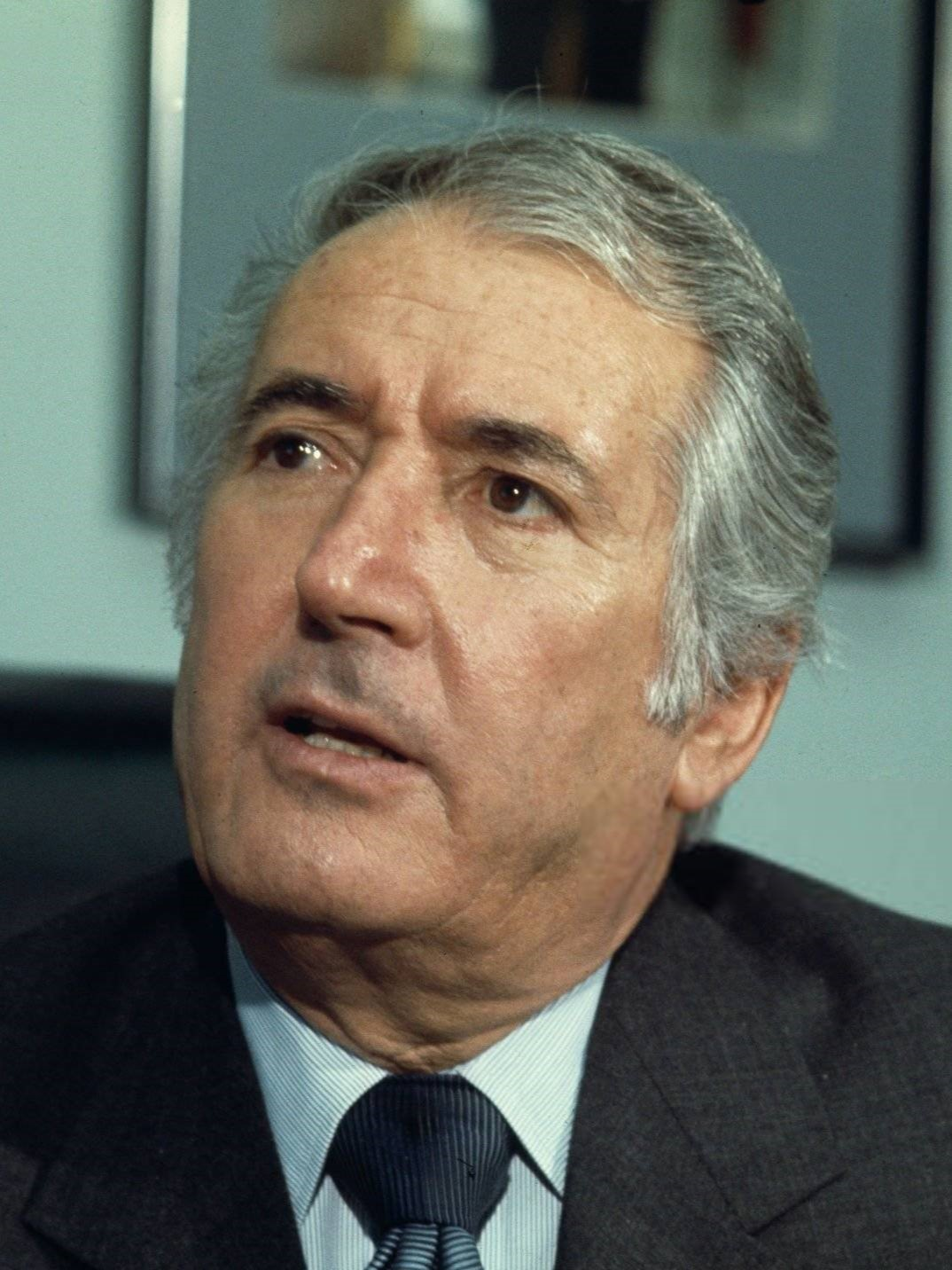

Nominee	Peter W. Rodino	Timothy Lee Jr.
Party	Democratic	Republican
Popular vote	76,684	14,551
Percentage	82.6%	15.7%
U.S. Representative before election
Peter W. Rodino
Democratic
Elected U.S. Representative
Peter W. Rodino
Democratic

Incumbent Democrat Peter W. Rodino won. The district included parts of Essex, Hudson, and Union counties.

=== Democratic primary ===
==== Candidates ====
- Alan Bowser, construction sales executive
- Peter W. Rodino, incumbent Representative since 1949

==== Results ====
1982 Democratic primary
Party	Candidate	Votes	%
Democratic	Peter W. Rodino (incumbent)	28,587	85.09%
Democratic	Alan Bowser	5,010	14.91%
Total votes		33,597	100.00%

=== Republican primary ===
==== Candidates ====
- Timothy Lee Jr.

==== Results ====
1982 Republican primary
Party	Candidate	Votes	%
Republican	Timothy Lee Jr.	4,034	100.00%
Total votes		4,034	100.00%

=== General election ===
==== Candidates ====
- Katharine Florentine (Libertarian)
- Christine Keno (The Unbossed Independent)
- Timothy Lee Jr. (Republican)
- Peter W. Rodino, incumbent Representative since 1949 (Democratic)

==== Results ====
1982 U.S. House election
Party	Candidate	Votes	%	±%
Democratic	Peter W. Rodino (incumbent)	76,684	82.59%	
Republican	Timothy Lee Jr.	14,551	15.67%	
Libertarian	Katharine Florentine	958	1.03%	
Independent	Christine Keno	659	0.71%	
Total votes		92,852	100.00%	
Democratic hold		Swing	{{{swing}}}	

== District 11 ==
1982 New Jersey's 11th congressional district election
- November 2, 1982
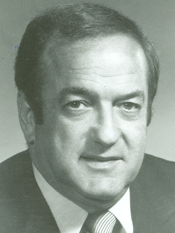

Nominee	Joseph Minish	Rey Redington
Party	Democratic	Republican
Popular vote	105,607	57,099
Percentage	64.3%	34.8%
U.S. Representative before election
Joseph Minish
Democratic
Elected U.S. Representative
Joseph Minish
Democratic

Incumbent Democrat Joseph Minish won. This district consisted of parts of Bergen, Essex, Hudson, Morris, and Passaic counties.

=== Democratic primary ===
==== Candidates ====
- Frank Askin, Rutgers Law School professor
- Joseph Minish, incumbent Representative from West Orange since 1963

==== Results ====
1982 Democratic primary
Party	Candidate	Votes	%
Democratic	Joseph Minish (incumbent)	27,354	75.22%
Democratic	Frank Askin	9,009	24.78%
Total votes		36,363	100.00%

=== Republican primary ===
==== Candidates ====
- Frank Bell, East Hanover engineer and candidate for House in 1978
- Robert A. Davis
- Rey Redington, former president of the Montclair Chamber of Commerce

==== Results ====
1982 Republican primary
Party	Candidate	Votes	%
Republican	Rey Redington	8,912	38.79%
Republican	Frank Bell	7,559	32.90%
Republican	Robert A. Davis	6,506	28.32%
Total votes		22,977	100.00%

=== General election ===
==== Candidates ====
- Joseph Minish, incumbent Representative from West Orange since 1963 (Democratic)
- Rey Redington, former president of the Montclair Chamber of Commerce (Republican)
- Richard S. Roth (Libertarian)

==== Results ====
1982 U.S. House election
Party	Candidate	Votes	%	±%
Democratic	Joseph Minish (incumbent)	105,607	64.30%	
Republican	Rey Redington	57,099	34.77%	
Libertarian	Richard S. Roth	1,531	0.93%	
Total votes		164,237	100.00%	
Republican hold		Swing	{{{swing}}}	

== District 12 ==
1982 New Jersey's 12th congressional district election
- November 2, 1982
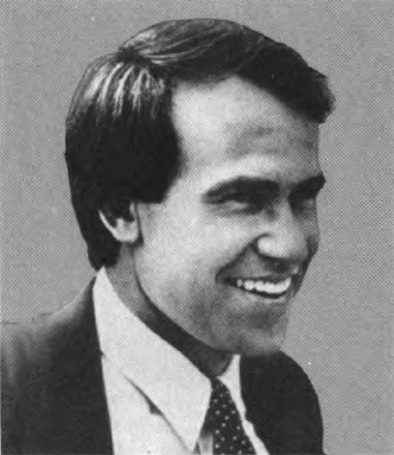

Nominee	Jim Courter	Peter Bearse
Party	Republican	Democratic
Popular vote	148,042	78,167
Percentage	65.0%	34.3%
U.S. Representative before election
Jim Courter and Millicent Fenwick
Republican
Elected U.S. Representative
Jim Courter
Republican

Incumbent Representative Millicent Fenwick ran for U.S. Senate, and incumbent Republican Representative Jim Courter won the election.

This sprawling district included parts of Essex, Hunterdon, Morris, Somerset, Sussex, Union, and Warren counties.

=== Republican primary ===
==== Candidates ====
- Jim Courter, incumbent Representative from Hackettstown since 1979
- Rodney Frelinghuysen, assemblyman from Morristown and son of former Representative Peter Frelinghuysen

===== Declined =====
- Millicent Fenwick, incumbent Representative from Bernardsville since 1975 (ran for U.S. Senate)
- Matt Rinaldo, incumbent Representative from Union since 1973 (ran in 7th district)

==== Results ====
1982 Republican primary
Party	Candidate	Votes	%
Republican	Jim Courter	39,354	63.10%
Republican	Rodney Frelinghuysen	23,015	36.90%
Total votes		62,369	100.00%

=== Democratic primary ===
==== Candidates ====
- Jeff Connor, son of former U.S. Secretary of Commerce John T. Connor

===== Withdrew =====
- William R. Norris III

==== Results ====
1982 Democratic primary
Party	Candidate	Votes	%
Democratic	Jeff Connor	12,504	100.00%
Total votes		12,504	100.00%

=== General election ===
==== Candidates ====
- Jeff Connor (Democratic)
- Jim Courter, former assistant Warren County prosecutor (Republican)
- Harold F. Leiendecker (Libertarian)

==== Results ====
1982 U.S. House election
Party	Candidate	Votes	%	±%
Republican	Jim Courter	117,793	66.76%	
Democratic	Jeff Connor	57,049	32.33%	
Libertarian	Harold Leiendecker	1,610	0.91%	
Total votes		176,452	100.00%	
Republican hold		Swing	{{{swing}}}	

== District 13 ==
1982 New Jersey's 13th congressional district election
- November 2, 1982
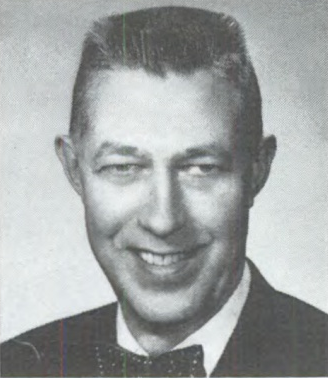

Nominee	Edwin B. Forsythe	George Callas
Party	Republican	Democratic
Popular vote	100,061	65,820
Percentage	59.5%	39.1%
U.S. Representative before election
Edwin B. Forsythe
Republican
Elected U.S. Representative
Edwin B. Forsythe
Republican

Incumbent Republican Edwin B. Forsythe won.

This district included parts of Burlington, Camden, Monmouth, and Ocean counties.

=== Republican primary ===
==== Candidates ====
- Richard D. Amber, computer operator
- Edwin B. Forsythe, incumbent Representative from Moorestown since 1970
- Donald T. King, paper manufacturing general manager

==== Results ====
1982 Republican primary
Party	Candidate	Votes	%
Republican	Edwin B. Forsythe (incumbent)	28,529	87.68%
Republican	Donald T. King	2,306	7.09%
Republican	Richard D. Amber	1,704	5.24%
Total votes		32,539	100.00%

=== Democratic primary ===
==== Candidates ====
- George Callas (write-in)

==== Results ====
1982 Democratic primary
Party	Candidate	Votes	%
Democratic	George Callas (write-in)	730	100.00%
Total votes		730	100.00%

=== General election ===
==== Candidates ====
- George Callas (Democratic)
- Leonard T. Flynn (Libertarian)
- Edwin B. Forsythe, incumbent Representative from Moorestown since 1970 (Republican)
- Don Smith (Constitution)
- Paula Volpe (Citizens)

==== Results ====
1982 U.S. House election
Party	Candidate	Votes	%	±%
Republican	Edwin B. Forsythe (incumbent)	100,061	59.47%	
Democratic	George S. Callas	65,820	39.12%	
Citizens	Paula Volpe	955	0.57%	
Libertarian	Leonard T. Flynn	769	0.46%	
Constitution	Don Smith	651	0.39%	
Total votes		168,256	100.00%	
Republican hold		Swing	{{{swing}}}	

== District 14 ==
1982 New Jersey's 14th congressional district election
- November 2, 1982
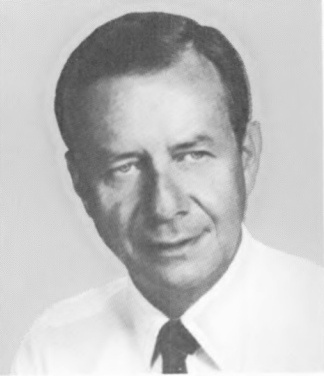

Nominee	Frank Guarini	Charles J. Catrillo
Party	Democratic	Republican
Popular vote	94,021	28,257
Percentage	74.3%	22.3%
U.S. Representative before election
Frank J. Guarini
Democratic
Elected U.S. Representative
Frank J. Guarini
Democratic

Incumbent Democrat Frank J. Guarini won. This district included parts of Bergen and Hudson counties.

=== Democratic primary ===
==== Candidates ====
- Frank J. Guarini, incumbent Representative since 1979

==== Results ====
1982 Democratic primary
Party	Candidate	Votes	%
Democratic	Frank J. Guarini (incumbent)	46,003	100.00%
Total votes		46,003	100.00%

=== Republican primary ===
==== Candidates ====
- Charles K. Krieger
- William Howard Link

==== Results ====
1982 Republican primary
Party	Candidate	Votes	%
Republican	Charles K. Krieger	4,580	82.43%
Republican	William Howard Link	976	17.57%
Total votes		5,556	100.00%

=== General election ===
==== Candidates ====
- Frank J. Guarini, incumbent Representative since 1979 (Democratic)
- Charles K. Krieger (Republican)
- Kenneth Famularo (Action Talks)
- Jack Murphy ("Mr. Liberty")
- Herbert H. Shaw (Politicians are Crooks)
- Louis J. Sicilia (Libertarian)

==== Results ====
1982 U.S. House election
Party	Candidate	Votes	%	±%
Democratic	Frank J. Guarini (incumbent)	94,021	74.26%	
Republican	Charles J. Catrillo	28,257	22.32%	
Independent	Jack Murphy	1,704	1.35%	
Independent	Herbert Shaw	1,232	0.97%	
Independent	Kenneth Famularo	921	0.73%	
Libertarian	Louis J. Sicilia	471	0.37%	
Total votes		126,606	100.00%	
Democratic hold		Swing	{{{swing}}}	
