= Janice H. Levin =

American businesswoman and philanthropist

- Born: Janice Hoffman; July 3, 1913; New York City, US
- Died: March 23, 2001 (aged 87); Palm Beach, Florida
- Education: Hunter College; New York University
- Occupations: Philanthropist, art collector
- Spouse: Philip J. Levin
- Children: 3, including Adam K. Levin and Susan L. Tepper
- Relatives: Arielle Tepper Madover (granddaughter)

Janice Hillary Levin (né Hoffman July 3, 1913 – March 23, 2001) was an American businesswoman and philanthropist and art collector from New York City. She was a patron of the ballet and collected mostly French impressionist paintings. She was a supporter of higher education as well as charities in Israel. She donated many of her paintings to museums.

== Early life ==
Janice Hoffman was born on July 3, 1913, in Manhattan, New York CIty, United States. Her father was Samuel Hoffman and her mother, Rene Hoffman. She attended Hunter College and New York University.

== Philanthropy ==
She served as the President of the Philip and Janice Levin Foundation.

Via the Foundation for Art and Preservation in Embassies, she made a charitable contribution for the design of a sculpture garden on the grounds of Winfield House, the official residence of the United States Ambassador to the United Kingdom in London. It includes two bronzes by Polish-born Jewish American sculptor Elie Nadelman: Seated Woman with Raised Arm (c.1924.) and Seated Woman with Raised Arm (c.1924). It was designed by landscape architect Morgan Wheelock and dedicated on October 12, 2000.

Janice also served on the board of trustees of the School of American Ballet. In 2000, she endowed the Janice Levin Dancer Award at the New York City Ballet, a fellowship given to a dancer of its corps de ballet every year. She was also a donor to the New York Philharmonic and the Metropolitan Opera. She paid for the tuition of Israeli-born Magda Fishman at the Manhattan School of Music. Fishman now serves as the cantor at B'nai Torah Congregation in Boca Raton, Florida.

She was a donor to the New York University School of Medicine, where she established the Janice H. Levin Student Scholarship Fund and served on its Foundation Board from 1998 to 2001. The James Michael Levin Playground in Central Park is named after her late son. The Janice H. Levin Building as well as the Philip J. Levin Theater on the campus of Rutgers University in Piscataway, New Jersey, are the result of charitable donations made by Levin.

Her philanthropy extended to Israel. She was a donor to the Israel Education Fund of the United Jewish Communities. She also made charitable contributions to the American Friends of the Israel Museum and the American Friends of The Israel Philharmonic Orchestra. In the 1960s, she established the Janice H. and Philip J. Levin Music Center in Jaffa through a charitable gift made to the Tel Aviv Foundation, the fundraising arm of Tel Aviv. The center gives music lessons to 1510 children from the greater Tel Aviv area, be they Jewish, Christian or Muslim, four times a week.

== Art collection ==
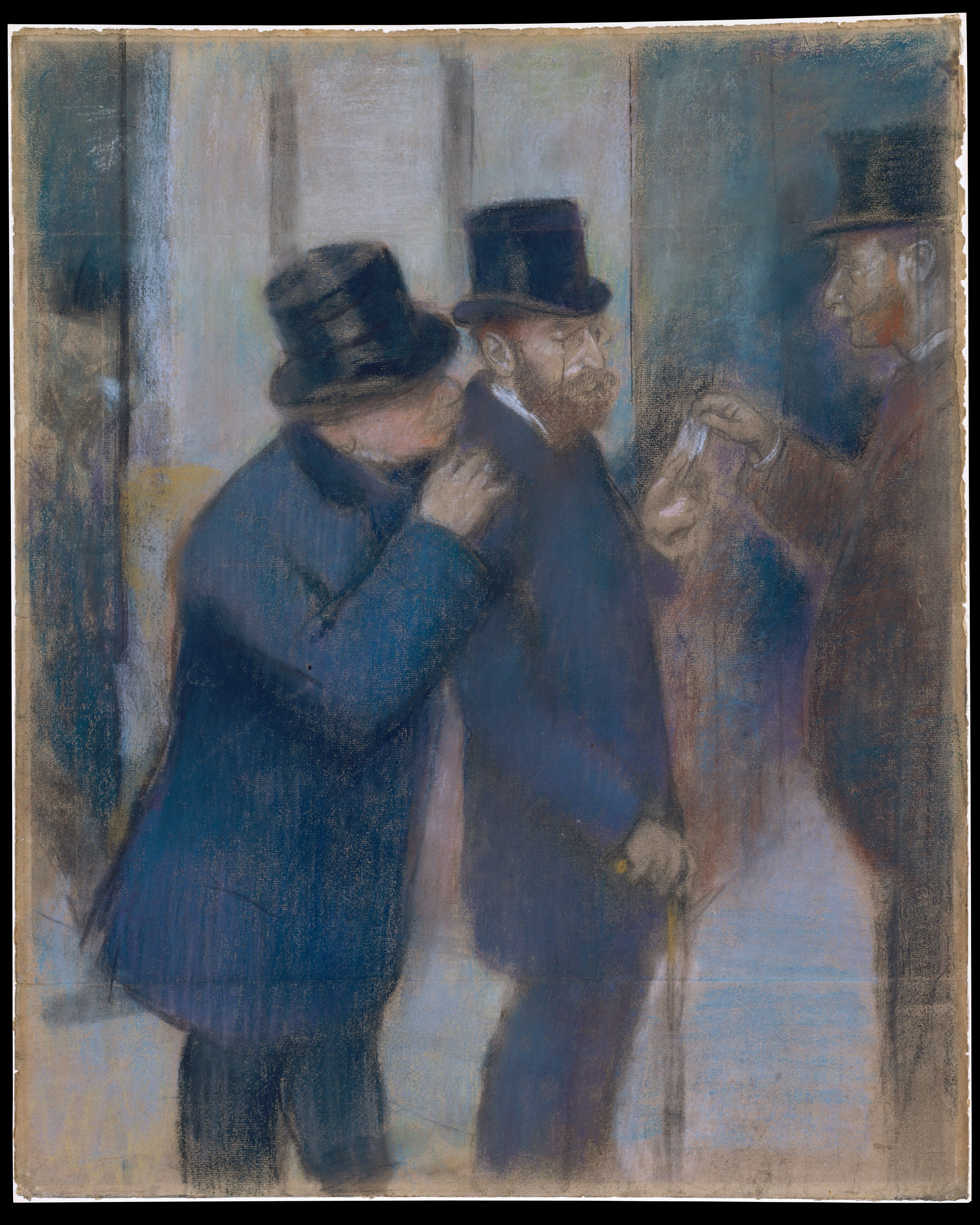
Portraits at the Stock Exchange, Edgar Degas (1878-79)

Levin collected mostly French impressionist paintings. Her extensive art collection included paintings by Pierre Bonnard, Eugène Boudin, Edgar Degas, Claude Monet, Berthe Morisot, Camille Pissarro, Pierre-Auguste Renoir, Alfred Sisley, Henri de Toulouse-Lautrec, Édouard Vuillard, etc. Janice had knowledge of many Impressionist paintings, and because of this she gave the Metropolitan Museum of Art three of the most influential Impressionist paintings. Those paintings were Sisley's Saburs Meadows in the Morning Sun, Camille Pissarro's Côte des Grouettes, and Edgar Degas's Portraits at the Stock Exchange. With the help of her husband, Philip Levin, they were able to be donors of art as well as collectors.

She served as an Honorary Trustee of the Metropolitan Museum of Art (Met) in New York City from 1993 to 2001. Indeed, she donated paintings by Degas, Pissarro and Sisley to the Met in New York City. She also donated paintings to the Museum of Modern Art in New York City, including, On the Cliff at Pourville, Clear Weather (1882). An early painting by Monet, The Artist's Garden in Argenteuil (A Corner of the Garden with Dahlias) (1873) was given to the National Gallery of Art in Washington, D.C., from her collection. Le Déjeuner, a 1923 painting by Bonnard, was acquired by Levin in 1971. It was auctioned by Christie's in New York City in 2006 and it is now at the National Gallery of Ireland in Dublin. Similarly, she auctioned La Seine à Vernon by Bonnard at Christie's to endow her family foundation.

In 2002, the Met staged an exhibition of Levin's collection, the catalogue for which was published as The Janice H. Levin Collection of French Art by the Yale University Press and edited by Richard Shone of The Burlington Magazine. The exhibition took place at the Met from November 19, 2002, through February 9, 2003.

== Personal life ==
She married Philip J. Levin (died 1971), a lawyer and real estate developer. They had two sons, Adam and James Michael; and two daughters, Catherine. and Susan. Adam Levin was the founder of Credit.com and Cyberscout, and Susan Tepper was a well-regarded artist. They resided on Fifth Avenue in Manhattan, East Hampton and Palm Beach, Florida. One of their granddaughters, Arielle Tepper Madover, is a Broadway producer. In 2002, a pair of diamonds by Van Cleef & Arpels in 1968 was sold from her estate for US$1,659,500.

== Death ==
She died on March 23, 2001, in Palm Beach, Florida. She was eighty-seven years old.
