= Arielle Tepper =

American entrepreneur and theater and film producer

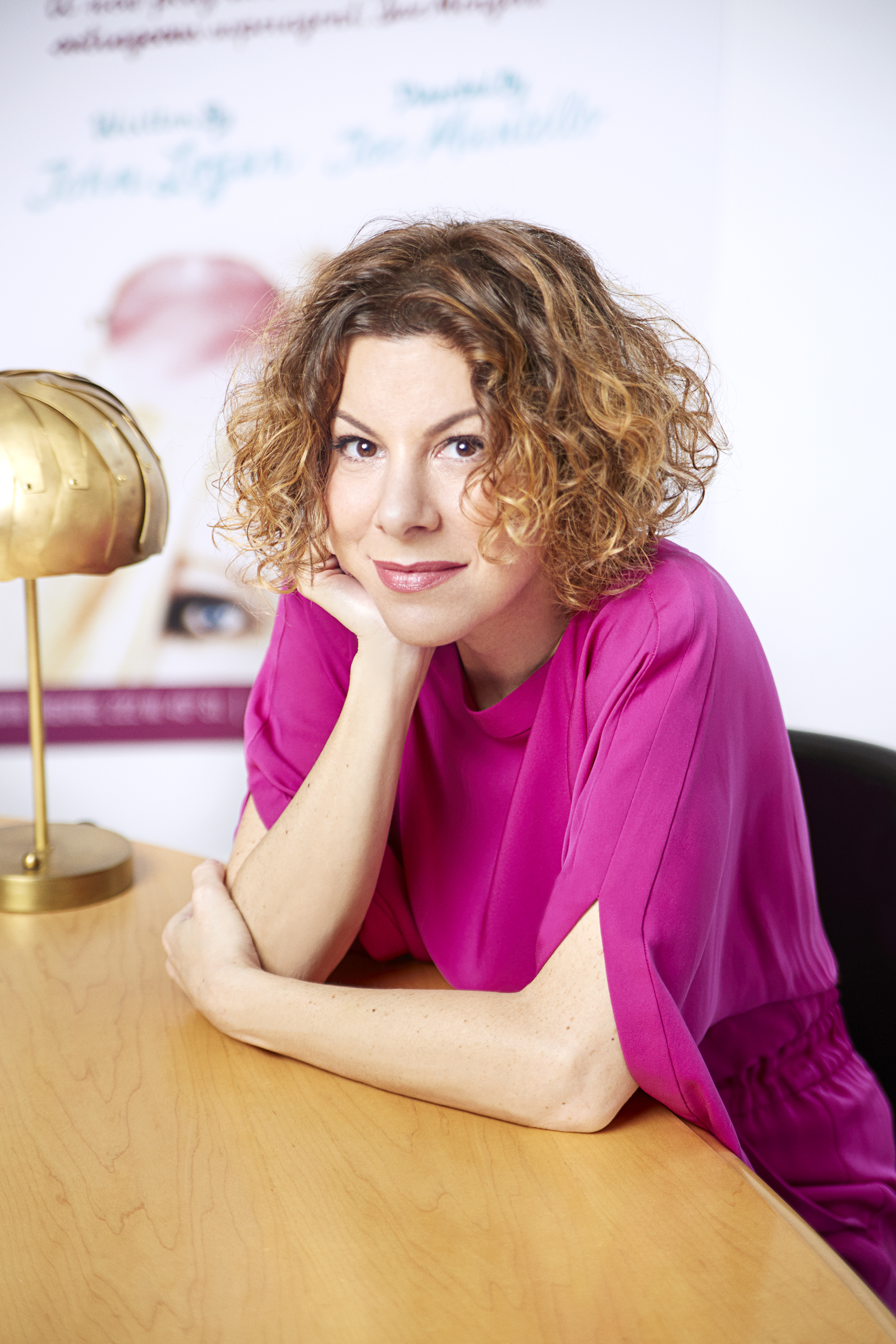
- Born: New York, NY
- Occupation(s): Entrepreneur, Broadway Producer
- Children: 3
- Relatives: Philip J. Levin, Janice H. Levin, Susan L. Tepper

Arielle Tepper is a theater and film producer, native New Yorker, and founder of the concierge service, WhatShouldWeDo?! She also serves as the Board Chair for The Public Theater in New York. Tepper has won six Tony Awards.

== Early life ==
Arielle Tepper was born and raised in Manhattan's Upper East Side. From the age of three, she attended The Dalton School in New York City, spending most of her summers in East Hampton. Arielle's mother, Susan L. Tepper was an artist and her father, a self-employed commodities trader.

At the age of eight, Arielle saw her first Broadway show, Annie, which she would later go on to produce.

After graduating from high school, she attended Syracuse University, majoring in Design and Technical Theater.

== Career ==
In 1998, after graduating from Syracuse University, Tepper founded Arielle Tepper Productions, a theatrical production company to develop and produce plays and musicals both on and off Broadway. Her first production was John Leguizamo's Freak, a semi-autobiographical one-person play that ran for six months at the Cort Theater in New York.

Arielle’s producing credits include the film Genius and many Broadway and Off-Broadway shows including: Les Liaisons Dangereuses, The Elephant Man starring Bradley Cooper, The Cripple of Inishmaan starring Daniel Radcliffe, Lucky Guy starring Tom Hanks, I’ll Eat You Last: A Chat with Sue Mengers starring Bette Midler, Annie, Hamlet starring Jude Law, Frost/Nixon, Monty Python’s Spamalot, and A Raisin in the Sun.

In 2016, Arielle took a small step back from her production company to launch her newest venture, WhatShouldWeDo?!, a New York planning, recommendations, and booking service.

== Philanthropy ==
In 2005, Tepper formed The Living Room for Artists, a not for profit 501(c)(3) organization whose aim is to sustain and support the Summer Play Festival which was first presented in 2004. SPF formed an alliance with The Public Theater and had a relationship with the Donmar Warehouse through its creation of the Playwright Residency Program.

In 2001, in an effort to promote Theater Education, she created The Tepper Center for Careers in Theatre which, through The Tepper Semester in New York provides opportunities for college seniors to develop specific strategies for pursuing their career goals in the entertainment industry. In 2005, she initiated a theater program for second and third graders at The Dalton School.

She serves on the Board of Governors for The Broadway League. She is an Emeritus member of the Syracuse University Board of Trustees, and a past Board member of The Dalton School. Tepper is also a member of the Juilliard Drama Council and has been listed in Crain’s 40 under 40 and was one of Cosmopolitan’s Fun Fearless Females.

== Production credits ==
Production Credits
Productions	Role	Date of Productions
Dear Evan Hansen [Musical, Original]	Co-Producer	Dec 04, 2016 - Present
Les Liaisons Dangereuses [Play, Revival]	Lead Producer	Oct 30, 2016 - Jan 08, 2017
An Act of God [Play, Comedy, Original]	Co-Producer	May 28, 2015 - Aug 02, 2015
The Elephant Man [Play, Drama, Revival]	Co-Producer	Dec 07, 2014 - Feb 21, 2015
The Cripple of Inishmaan [Play, Original]	Lead Producer	Apr 20, 2014 - Jul 20, 2014
I'll Eat You Last: A Chat With Sue Mengers [Play, Solo, Original]	Co-Producer	Apr 24, 2013 - Jun 30, 2013
Lucky Guy [Play, Drama, Original]	Co-Producer	Apr 01, 2013 - Jul 03, 2013
Annie [Musical, Comedy, Revival]	Lead Producer	Nov 08, 2012 - Jan 05, 2014
Red [Play, Drama, Original]	Lead Producer	Apr 01, 2010 - Jun 27, 2010
Hamlet [Play, Tragedy, Revival]	Lead Producer	Oct 06, 2009 - Dec 06, 2009
Mary Stuart [Play, Drama, Revival]	Lead Producer	Apr 19, 2009 - Aug 16, 2009
Hair [Musical, Revival]	Co-Producer	Mar 31, 2009 - Jun 27, 2010
33 Variations [Play, Drama, Play with music, Original]	Co-Producer	Mar 09, 2009 - May 21, 2009
Equus [Play, Drama, Revival]	Co-Producer	Sep 25, 2008 - Feb 08, 2009
Frost/Nixon [Play, Drama, Original]	Lead Producer	Apr 22, 2007 - Aug 19, 2007
The Pillowman [Play, Drama, Original]	Co-Producer	Apr 10, 2005 - Sep 18, 2005
Spamalot [Musical, Comedy, Original]	Co-Producer	Mar 17, 2005 - Jan 11, 2009
Democracy [Play, Drama, Original]	Co-Producer	Nov 18, 2004 - Apr 17, 2005
A Raisin in the Sun [Play, Drama, Revival]	Co-Producer	Apr 26, 2004 - Jul 11, 2004
Jumpers [Play, Farce, Revival]	Co-Producer	Apr 25, 2004 - Jul 11, 2004
Dance of the Vampires [Musical, Comedy, Original]	Co-Producer	Dec 09, 2002 - Jan 25, 2003
Hollywood Arms [Play, Drama, Original]	Co-Producer	Oct 31, 2002 - Jan 05, 2003
A Class Act [Musical, Original]	Co-Producer	Mar 11, 2001 - Jun 10, 2001
James Joyce's The Dead [Musical, Drama, Original]	Co-Producer	Jan 11, 2000 - Apr 16, 2000
I'm Still Here...Damn It! [Play, Solo, Stand-up, Comedy, Original]	Co-Producer	Nov 05, 1998 - Jan 02, 1999
Freak [Play, Solo, Comedy, Original]	Lead Producer	Feb 12, 1998 - Jul 04, 1998
