= Susan Tepper =

American painter

- Born: August 30, 1943; Plainfield, New Jersey
- Died: February 18, 1991 (aged 47); New York, New York
- Education: Vassar College, Arts Students League, School of Visual Arts, the New York Studio School, and the Maryland Institute of Arts.
- Occupation: Artist
- Style: Neo Expressionist, Figurative
- Children: Arielle Tepper Madover (daughter)
- Parent: Philip J. Levin (father) Janice H. Levin (mother)

Susan Tepper (August 30, 1943 – February 18, 1991) was an American Neo-Expressionist and Figurative painter.

== Early life and education ==
Susan Tepper was born Susan Levin on August 30, 1943, in Plainfield, New Jersey, the daughter of Philip J. Levin, a real estate developer of shopping malls and a one-time majority shareholder of the movie studio Metro-Goldwyn-Mayer, and president and chief operating officer of Madison Square Garden Corporation, and Janice H. Levin, philanthropist, art collector. and businesswoman. After attending Vassar College, Tepper studied at the Art Students League, School of Visual Arts, the New York Studio School, and the Maryland Institute of Arts.

== Career ==
Although Tepper attended art schools in New York City and had her first studio there, the prominence of her parents resulted in her cloistering herself in East Hampton, New York, where she maintained a studio and actively worked from 1977 until her death in 1991. In her paintings and drawings, Tepper explored both the intimacy of self-portraiture and wider topics related to gender and identity. "I paint, I draw. I can only do that which involves my hand and my eye directly—no prints, no lithos, no chemicals, no technicalities—from the brain to the surface, and if the first is out of order than I am in trouble. I am in trouble often." Working in disciplined series, the artist moved fluidly between autobiography and social issues. “I am a painter of content – images of women swept into caves of isolation. I paint the story of this condition.” Throughout the 1970s and 1980s, Tepper focused on the body as a leitmotif. In her late work, Tepper developed a bold and graphic visual language. Her large mural-like canvases depict intertwining figures in black and white, creating kaleidoscopic landscapes.

In tandem with her private studio practice, Tepper fostered the careers of others. In 1985, she co-founded the East Hampton Center for Contemporary Art (EHCCA), a non-profit exhibition space and resource center, in East Hampton, NY. The ambitious program was modeled after alternative venues such as Artists Space in Manhattan and presented both established and emerging artists. In the six years of operation, EHCCA presented the work of more than 350 artists in 40 solo and group exhibitions. EHCCA was regularly cited by critics for its emphasis on the cutting edge, its dedication to emerging arts, and its sponsorship of site-specific outdoor sculpture projects. Exhibitions at EHCCA were often thematic and included artists from the region as well as New York City and elsewhere. In addition to mounting exhibitions, EHCCA staged special events including premiering performances by Joseph Pintauro; lectures by art critics Robert Storr and Eleanor Heartney; and readings by Kenneth Koch and David Leavitt, among others. The EHCCA board of advisors included Magdelena DaBrowski, B.H. Friedman, Hope Harris, Bill Jensen, Roy Nicholson, Li-Lan, Susana Torruella Leval, Robert Long, Freda Mindlin, Alfonso Ossorio, and Frank Wimberley.

Tepper's daughter, Arielle Tepper Madover, is restoring her mother's original East Hampton studio and is in the process of cataloguing her mother's work and archives, as well as loaning works for exhibition to institutions (see Selected Exhibitions).

== Selected exhibitions ==
In 2015, Tepper's work was selected for inclusion in the exhibition Selfies and Self Portraits of the East End on view at The Museum at Guild Hall in East Hampton, NY (June 20 – July 26, 2015). The group exhibition featured six of her self-portraits from the 1970s alongside artists such as Ross Bleckner, Ahn Duong, Eric Fischl, Elizabeth Peyton, Cindy Sherman, Chuck Close, Julian Schnabel, and Billy Sullivan among others.

- Susan Tepper and Bianca Beck, Halsey McKay Gallery, East Hampton, NY, July 6 – 29, 2019.
- Flashpoint: An Intersection of History, Perseverance, and Joy, Chaos Theory, Sag Harbor, NY, July 28 – September 2, 2018.
- Hog's Curve, Halsey McKay Gallery, East Hampton, NY, April 7 – May 12, 2018.
- 12th Annual Thanksgiving Collective, Tripoli Gallery, Southampton, NY, November 26, 2016 – January 30, 2017.
- Susan Tepper: Paintings 1978-1983, Tripoli Gallery, Southampton, NY, August 20 − October 3, 2016.
- Selfies and Portraits of the East End, Guild Hall, East Hampton, NY, June 10 – July 26, 2015.
- The Human Factor, Painting Space Gallery – P.S. 122, New York, 1985.
- Tight Spaces / Social Graces, Ashawagh Hall, East Hampton, NY, 1985.
- Members’ Exhibition, Guild Hall, East Hampton, NY, 1984.
- Urban Tribe – Two Painters, Ashawagh Hall, East Hampton, NY, 1984.
- Springs Artists Invitation, Ashawagh Hall, East Hampton, NY, 1984.
- Susan Tepper: Drawings and Paintings, Panoras Gallery, New York, NY, 1971.

== Personal life ==
Susan Tepper's immediate family includes her sister Catherine Levin, her brother Adam Levin, and her daughter Arielle Tepper Madover, a Broadway producer.

== Death ==
Tepper died on February 18, 1991, in New York City of cancer.
