= Philip J. Levin =

- Born: c. 1909; New York City, U.S.
- Died: August 3, 1971 (aged 61–62); New York City, U.S.
- Occupation: Real estate developer
- Spouse: Janice H. Levin
- Children: Adam K. Levin, Catherine Levin and Susan L. Tepper
- Relatives: Arielle Tepper Madover (granddaughter)

Philip J. Levin (c. 1909 – August 3, 1971) was an American real estate developer of shopping malls and the majority shareholder of the movie studio Metro-Goldwyn-Mayer.

== Early life ==
Philip J. Levin was born c. 1909 in New York City.

== Career ==
A real estate developer, he built many shopping malls all over the United States, including Maine, Florida and California.

He was the majority shareholder of the movie studio Metro-Goldwyn-Mayer in the 1960s. In 1967, he tried to fire its president, Robert O'Brien. He later sold his stake to Edgar Bronfman Sr.

In 1970, he became the head of the Gulf & Western Land Development company, including its subsidiary Chicago Thoroughbred Enterprises, which owned the Arlington Park and Washington Park Race Track. He was also an investor in casinos in Las Vegas, Nevada. Additionally, he served as the President of Madison Square Garden.

He was a donor to the Republican Party in Illinois.

== Personal life ==
He was married to Janice H. Levin, a philanthropist and art collector. Their son, Adam K. Levin is the founder of Credit.com and Cyberscout. Their granddaughter, Arielle Tepper Madover, is a Broadway producer.

== Death ==
He died of a heart attack on August 3, 1971, at The Pierre hotel in Manhattan. He was sixty-two years old. His funeral took place on August 5, 1971, in Plainfield, New Jersey.
