= James J. Howard =

American politician

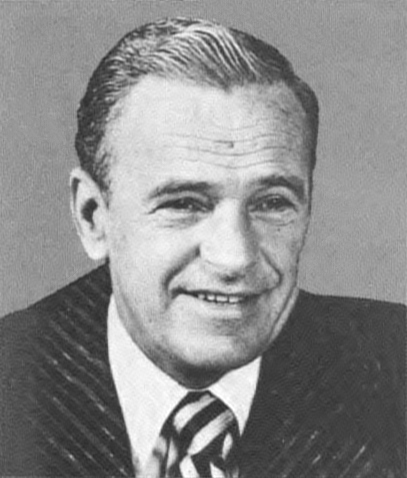

Chair of the House Committee on Public Works and Transportation
- In office January 3, 1981 – March 25, 1988
- Preceded by: Bizz Johnson
- Succeeded by: Glenn M. Anderson

Member of the U.S. House of Representatives from New Jersey's 3rd district
- In office January 3, 1965 – March 25, 1988
- Preceded by: James C. Auchincloss
- Succeeded by: Frank Pallone

Personal details
- Born: James John Howard; July 24, 1927 Irvington, New Jersey, U.S.
- Died: March 25, 1988 (aged 60) Washington, D.C., U.S.
- Resting place: Catharine's Cemetery in Sea Girt, New Jersey
- Party: Democratic
- Profession: Teacher

James John Howard (July 24, 1927 – March 25, 1988) was an American educator and Democratic Party politician who represented New Jersey's 3rd congressional district in the United States House of Representatives from 1965 until his death from a heart attack in Washington, D.C. in 1988.

== Early life and career ==
He was born on July 24, 1927, in Irvington, New Jersey. Howard graduated from St. Rose School, Belmar, in 1941, Asbury Park High School in 1947, St. Bonaventure University, in 1952; and earned a Master of Education degree from Rutgers University-New Brunswick in 1958.

Prior to being elected to the House, Howard served in the United States Navy in the South Pacific from December 30, 1944, to July 19, 1946; teacher and acting principal in the Wall Township Public Schools from 1952 to 1964.

== Tenure in Congress ==
Elected as a Democrat to the Eighty-ninth and to the eleven succeeding Congresses and served from January 3, 1965, until his death from a heart attack in Washington, D.C., on March 25, 1988.

On May 23, 1967, Howard created a public controversy over the M16, the basic combat rifle in Vietnam, beginning after he read a letter to the House of Representatives in which a Marine in Vietnam claims that almost all Americans killed in the Battle of Hill 881 died as a result of their new M16 rifles jamming. By the end of 1967, the problem had been resolved.

In 1974, he introduced the idea of a 55-mile-per-hour speed limit. And Congress soon imposed a nationwide 55 MPH (90 km/h) speed limit by threatening to withhold highway funds from states that did not adopt this limit. It was estimated a speed of 55 mph (89 km/h) used 17% less fuel per mile than a speed of 75 MPH (120 km/h). It was also believed, based on a noticeable drop the first year the limit was imposed, that it cut down on highway deaths, but later studies were more mixed on this point. In addition, Howard authored an innovative coordinated surface transportation policy and program.

Howard's other notable, enduring contributions to the fight for enhanced highway safety include sponsorship of a myriad of bills such as: the Howard-Barnes anti-drunk driving legislation (1982); the Child Restraint Law (1984), which increased funding for state child passenger safety programs; legislation establishing a uniform minimum drinking age of 21 (1984); the National Driver's Register (1982); the National Infrastructure Act (1983); and the Motor Carrier Act (1980), which was the first regulatory reform of the trucking industry in half a century that, among other things, increased federal aid for truck safety programs.

Howard served as chairman of the Committee on Public Works and Transportation (Ninety-seventh through One Hundredth Congresses).

At the time of his death, Howard was fighting an effort by transportation-related businesses move to persuade Congress to "complete" truck deregulation, a move they said would save billions in distribution costs. Upon his death the committee chairmanship passed to Rep. Glenn M. Anderson (D-CA).

Frank Pallone filled the seat vacated by Howard's death in 1988.

== Death and burial ==
Howard was a resident of Spring Lake Heights, New Jersey. He died on March 25, 1988 and is interred in St. Catharine's Cemetery in Sea Girt, New Jersey.

== Honors ==
- On September 21, 1985, the Northeast Fisheries Science Center was destroyed by a fire. On October 11, 1989, a groundbreaking ceremony was held at Sandy Hook, New Jersey for the construction of a 36,000-square-foot (3,300 m^{2}) marine research laboratory to be occupied by scientists from the Department of Commerce National Oceanic and Atmospheric Administration's National Marine Fisheries Service (NMFS), as well as from state agencies through the New Jersey Marine Sciences Consortium (NJMSC), and academic institutions in New Jersey. The new laboratory, was completed in about three years and named the James J. Howard Marine Sciences Laboratory to honor the late U.S. Representative who strongly supported marine research'. The primary mission of the Howard Laboratory is to conduct research in ecology, leading to a better understanding of both coastal and estuarine organisms and the effects of human activities on nearshore marine populations.
- The Governors Highway Safety Association (GHSA) named their highest honor the James J. Howard Highway Safety Trailblazer Award. The award honors an individual for sustained outstanding leadership in endeavors that significantly improve highway safety. The recipient of this award must have undertaken a concerted, long-term effort to make our nation's highways safer and has made a significant contribution to the field of highway safety. The recipient must have established and implemented programs or have been responsible for notable advancements in technology or research throughout the years that have yielded a demonstrated safety impact.

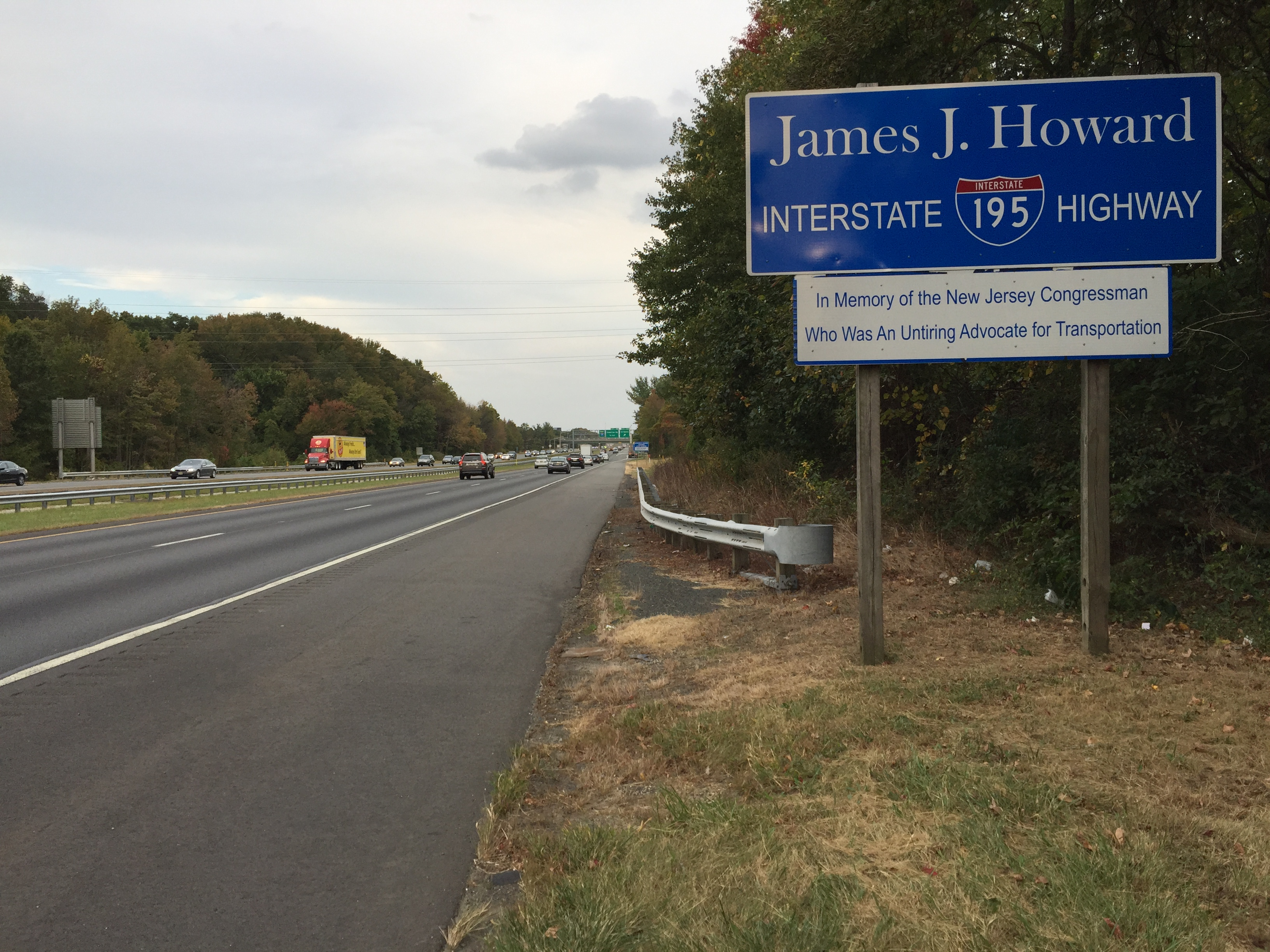
James J. Howard Interstate Highway sign along I-195

- The Asbury Park main train station and bus terminal was torn down and rebuilt as the James J. Howard Transportation Center.
- On April 6, 1988, President Ronald Reagan signs H.R. 4263 naming Interstate 195 (I-195) in New Jersey the James J. Howard Interstate Highway. Interstate 195 is an east–west freeway linking Trenton to the Jersey Shore.
- Department of Veterans Affairs's Veterans Health Administration established the James J. Howard Veterans Outpatient Clinic in Brick Township, New Jersey, to provides primary care and specialty services to local veterans.
- Fort Monmouth's Eatontown Gardens, 600 family housing units in fifty two buildings, constructed 1953–1954, was renamed for Congressman James J. Howard in recognition of his long-time support for Fort Monmouth and his contributions in Congress to the welfare of soldiers and the Army.

== See also ==
- List of members of the United States Congress who died in office (1950–1999)

U.S. House of Representatives
Preceded by James C. Auchincloss	Member of the U.S. House of Representatives from New Jersey's 3rd congressional district 1965–1988	Succeeded by Frank Pallone
Political offices
Preceded by Bizz Johnson; California	Chairman of House Transportation Committee; 1981–1988	Succeeded by Glenn M. Anderson; California
