= New Jersey Division of Consumer Affairs =

State agency of New Jersey, United States

State of New Jersey Division of Consumer Affairs
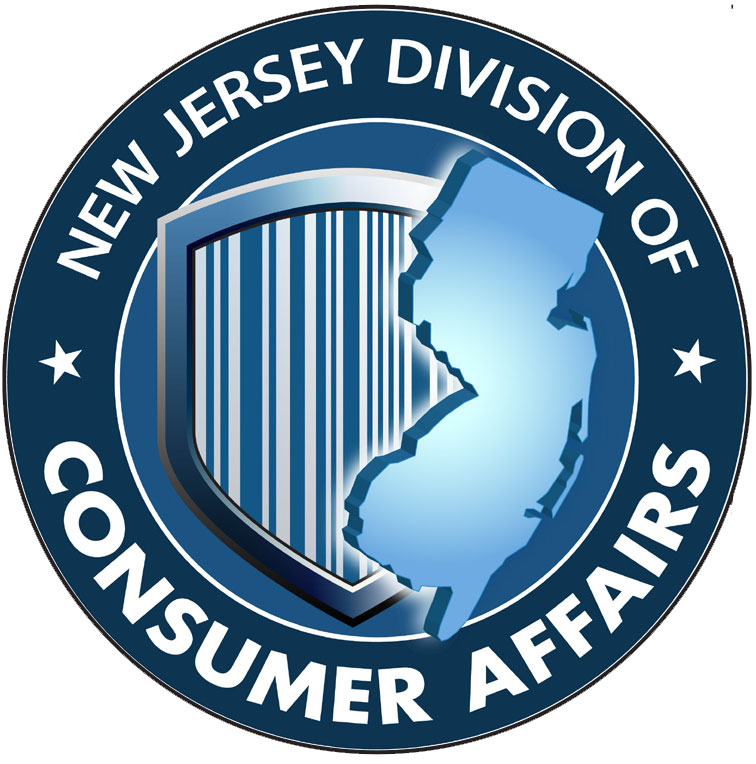
- Seal of the NJDCA

Agency overview
- Jurisdiction: New Jersey
- Headquarters: 124 Halsey Street, Newark, NJ 07102
- Agency executive: Paul R. Rodriguez, Acting Director
- Parent agency: New Jersey Department of Law and Public Safety
- Child agency: New Jersey Legalized Games of Chance Control Commission
- Website: http://www.njconsumeraffairs.gov/

The New Jersey Division of Consumer Affairs (DCA) is a governmental agency in the U.S. state of New Jersey that is responsible for protecting the public "from fraud, deceit and misrepresentation in the sale of goods and services." The DCA operates within the New Jersey Department of Law and Public Safety in the office of the New Jersey Attorney General.

Sections and units within the Division of Consumer Affairs include:

- Alternative Dispute Resolution - resolves disputes outside of the court system
- Bureau of Securities - regulates the securities industry in New Jersey
- Regulated Businesses and Professions - supervises 41 boards and committees, regulating more than 80 separate professions and occupations, including cosmetologists, plumbers and veterinarians
- Office of Consumer Protection - investigates consumer fraud complaints
- Legalized Games of Chance Control Commission - oversees the operation of bingo and raffle games
- Office of Weights and Measures - verifies the accuracy of commercial weighing and measuring devices

== Notable Directors ==
- Paul J. Krebs
- Millicent Fenwick
- James J. Barry Jr
