= Adam K. Levin =

- Education: Stanford University (A.B.); University of Michigan (J.D.)
- Occupations: Founder of CyberScout; Co-founder of Credit.com; Host of What the Hack with Adam Levin; Former director of New Jersey Division of Consumer Affairs

Adam K. Levin, the former director of the New Jersey Division of Consumer Affairs, is the co-founder of Credit.com and the founder of CyberScout. He is the author of the Amazon Best Seller Swiped: How to Protect Yourself in a World Full of Scammers, Phishers, and Identity Thieves, and is host of the Webby-nominated podcast What the Hack with Adam Levin.

== Education ==
Levin received an A.B. from Stanford University and his J.D. from the University of Michigan in 1974.

== Career ==
As Director of Consumer Affairs in New Jersey, he worked with the New Jersey Legislature and various state regulatory agencies to enact over 40 major consumer protection laws and regulations. He led the fight to force 15 million unsafe Firestone 500 tires off the road. Levin advised consumers on symptoms that indicated failing tires and the proper way to check tires for defects. He developed new consumer educational materials and distribution channels and made over 1,200 consumer educational presentations in five years. Other accomplishments as Director of the New Jersey Division of Consumer Affairs include the promotion of statewide financial literacy programs, two major tire recalls, and a national effort to secure the right for professionals to advertise- an occurrence which created favorable conditions for price competition and established greater consumer protections in the health spa industry.

In 1982, he resigned his post as Director of Consumer Affairs to run for office. He won the Democratic nomination for the United States House of Representatives in New Jersey’s 7th Congressional District. Levin ran against the Republican Matthew Rinaldo but was unsuccessful in unseating Rinaldo who had been the five term incumbent in the 7th Congressional District. Once the election was over, Levin entered the real estate business and co-founded Kingswood Management, the Regal Management (formerly Bellmarc-Regal Management), one of the largest residential property management companies in New York City.

In 1994, he co-founded Credit.com Inc, an online financial services educator and resource for consumers to manage their credit finances. In 2003, he founded CyberScout, an online provider of identity management, identity theft recovery services, breach services and data risk management for businesses.

Levin is also the president of the Philip and Janice Levin Foundation (which is a major contributor to the renovation of 19th-century paintings galleries at the Metropolitan Museum of Art) and is on the board of the Foundation for Art and Preservation in Embassies.

== What the Hack with Adam Levin podcast ==
Levin hosts a weekly podcast called What the Hack with Adam Levin, with co-hosts Beau Friedlander and Travis Taylor, which features guests and experts who discuss their experiences with scams, identity theft, privacy and other cyber-related issues. Notable guests have included Sen. Al Franken, Daily Show Correspondent Roy Wood, Jr. and others.

In 2023, What the Hack won two Signal Awards, a Gold AVA Award, and was nominated for a Webby.
