= Ashkin =

Ashkin is a surname. Notable people with the surname include:

- Arthur Ashkin (1922–2020), American physicist, brother of Julius
- Julius Ashkin (1920–1982), American physicist
- Michael Ashkin (born 1955), American artist

== See also ==
- Askin
