= Tajareh =

Tajareh or Tajreh or Tejrah (Persian: تجره) may refer to:

- Tajreh, Hamadan
- Tajareh, Barzok, Kashan County, Isfahan Province
- Tajareh, Neyasar, Kashan County, Isfahan Province
- Tajareh, Khvansar, Isfahan Province
- Tajareh, Saveh, Markazi Province
- Tajareh, Shazand, Markazi Province
- Tajareh, Tehran
- Tajareh Sadat
- Tajareh Sar Ab-e Sadat
- Tajareh-ye Galehdar
