= Eskin =

Eskin is a surname. Notable people with the surname include:

- Alex Eskin (born 1965), American mathematician
- Arnold Eskin (1940–2019), chronobiologist
- Avigdor Eskin (born 1960), Russian-Israeli journalist
- Eleazar Eskin, American computer scientist and geneticist
- Gregory Eskin (born 1936), Russian-Israeli-American mathematician
- Howard Eskin (born 1951), American sports anchor
- Jules Eskin (1931–2016), American cellist
- Virginia Eskin (born 1940), American pianist

== See also ==
- Eskin-e Olya, Iran
- Eskin-e Sofla, Iran
- Eskin, Kızıltepe, Turkey
- Eskini, California
