= Badiyeh =

Badiyeh (Persian: باديه) may refer to:

- Badiyeh 1
- Badiyeh 2
- Badiyeh 3
