= Askins =

Askins is a surname. Notable people with the surname include:

- Barbara Askins (born 1939), American chemist
- Charles Askins (1907–1999), American lawman, US Army officer, and writer
- Herbert R. Askins (1898–1982), US Assistant Secretary of the Navy
- Jari Askins (born 1953), American judge, lawyer, and politician
- Keith Askins (born 1967), American basketball player
- Robert Askins (1919–2010), American suspected serial killer

== See also ==
- W.T. Askins House
- Askin, another surname
