= Darreh Saki =

Darreh Saki (Persian: دره ساكي) may refer to:

- Darreh Saki, Dowreh
- Darreh Saki, Khorramabad
- Darreh Saki-ye Olya
- Darreh Saki-ye Sofla
