= 1986 United States House of Representatives elections in New Jersey =

- November 4, 1986

All 14 New Jersey seats to the United States House of Representatives
- Turnout: 43% (▼36pp)
	Majority party	Minority party
Party	Democratic	Republican
Last election	8	6
Seats won	8	6
Seat change	Steady	Steady
Popular vote	811,066	730,596
Percentage	52.2%	47.0%
Swing	▲1.8	▼2.2

Democratic
40–50%
50–60%
60–70%
70–80%
90–100%
Republican
50–60%
60–70%
70–80%

The 1986 United States House of Representatives elections in New Jersey were held on November 8, 1986, to determine who would represent the people of New Jersey in the United States House of Representatives. This election coincided with national elections for U.S. House and U.S. Senate. New Jersey had fourteen seats in the House, apportioned according to the 1980 United States census. Representatives are elected for two-year terms.

All incumbents were re-elected to their seats.

== Overview ==
1986 United States House of Representatives elections in New Jersey
Party	Votes	Percentage	Candidates	Seats	+/–
Democratic	811,066	52.21%	14	8	Steady
Republican	730,596	47.03%	13	6	Steady
Socialist Workers	1,977	0.13%	1	0	Steady
Libertarian	931	0.06%	1	0	Steady
Independents	8,974	0.58%	5	0	Steady
Totals	1,553,544	100.00%	34	14	Steady

== District 1 ==
1986 New Jersey's 1st congressional district election
- November 4, 1986
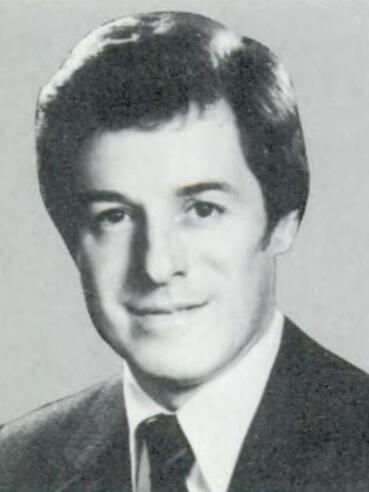

Nominee	James Florio	Fred Busch
Party	Democratic	Republican
Popular vote	93,497	29,175
Percentage	75.6%	23.6%
U.S. Representative before election
James Florio
Democratic
Elected U.S. Representative
James Florio
Democratic

Incumbent Democrat James Florio won. The district included parts of Burlington, Camden, and Gloucester counties.

=== Democratic primary ===
==== Candidates ====
- James Florio, incumbent Representative since 1975
- Charles W. Kahler

==== Results ====
1986 Democratic primary
Party	Candidate	Votes	%
Democratic	James Florio (incumbent)	22,581	95.70%
Democratic	Charles W. Kahler	1,015	4.30%
Total votes		23,596	100.00%

=== Republican primary ===
==== Candidates ====
- Fred A. Busch

==== Results ====
1986 Republican primary
Party	Candidate	Votes	%
Republican	Fred A. Busch	7,537	100.00%
Total votes		7,537	100.00%

=== General election ===
==== Candidates ====
- Fred A. Busch (Republican)
- James Florio, incumbent Representative since 1975 (Republican)
- Jerry Zeldin (Libertarian)

==== Results ====
1986 U.S. House election
Party	Candidate	Votes	%	±%
Democratic	James Florio (incumbent)	93,497	75.64%	
Republican	Fred A. Busch	29,175	23.60%	
Libertarian	Jerry Zeldin	931	0.75%	
Total votes		123,603	100.00%	
Turnout		126,584	47.72%	
Democratic hold		Swing	{{{swing}}}	

== District 2 ==
1986 New Jersey's 2nd congressional district election
- November 4, 1986
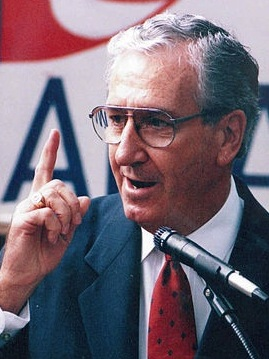

Nominee	William J. Hughes	Alfred Bennington Jr.
Party	Democratic	Republican
Popular vote	83,821	35,167
Percentage	68.3%	28.6%
U.S. Representative before election
William J. Hughes
Democratic
Elected U.S. Representative
William J. Hughes
Democratic

Incumbent William J. Hughes won. This district, the largest in South Jersey, included all of Atlantic, Cape May, Cumberland, and Salem counties and parts of Gloucester County.

=== Democratic primary ===
==== Candidates ====
- William J. Hughes, incumbent Representative since 1975
- Robert Wesser

==== Results ====
1986 Democratic primary
Party	Candidate	Votes	%
Democratic	William J. Hughes (incumbent)	12,113	95.11%
Democratic	Robert Wesser	623	4.89%
Total votes		12,736	100.00%

=== Republican primary ===
==== Candidates ====
- Alfred J. Bennington Jr., Northfield lawyer

==== Results ====
1986 Republican primary
Party	Candidate	Votes	%
Republican	Alfred J. Bennington Jr.	13,315	100.00%
Total votes		13,315	100.00%

=== General election ===
==== Candidates ====
- Alfred J. Bennington Jr., Northfield lawyer (Republican)
- William J. Hughes, incumbent Representative since 1975 (Democratic)
- Len Smith (Pro Life, Anti-Abortion)

==== Results ====
1986 U.S. House election
Party	Candidate	Votes	%	±%
Democratic	William J. Hughes (incumbent)	83,821	68.26%	
Republican	Alfred J. Bennington Jr.	35,167	28.64%	
Independent	Len Smith	3,812	3.10%	
Total votes		122,800	100.00%	
Turnout		129,479	47.79%	
Democratic hold		Swing	{{{swing}}}	

== District 3 ==
1986 New Jersey's 3rd congressional district election
- November 4, 1986
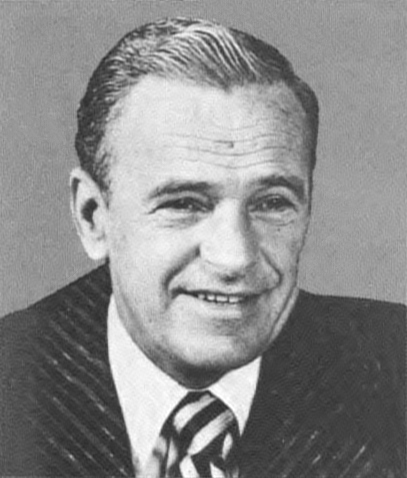

Nominee	James J. Howard	Brian T. Kennedy
Party	Democratic	Republican
Popular vote	73,743	51,882
Percentage	58.7%	41.3%
U.S. Representative before election
James J. Howard
Democratic
Elected U.S. Representative
James J. Howard
Democratic

Incumbent Democrat James J. Howard won.

This district included parts of Monmouth and Ocean counties.

=== Democratic primary ===
==== Candidates ====
- James J. Howard, incumbent Representative since 1965
- Jeanne Martines

==== Results ====
1986 Democratic primary
Party	Candidate	Votes	%
Democratic	James J. Howard (incumbent)	11,684	95.22%
Democratic	Jeanne Martines	586	4.78%
Total votes		12,270	100.00%

=== Republican primary ===
==== Candidates ====
- Brian T. Kennedy, former state senator from Sea Girt and nominee for this district in 1984

==== Results ====
1986 Republican primary
Party	Candidate	Votes	%
Republican	Brian T. Kennedy	12,431	100.00%
Total votes		12,431	100.00%

=== General election ===
==== Candidates ====
- James J. Howard, incumbent Representative since 1965 (Democratic)
- Brian T. Kennedy, former state senator from Sea Girt and nominee for this district in 1984 (Republican)

==== Results ====
1986 U.S. House election
Party	Candidate	Votes	%	±%
Democratic	James J. Howard (incumbent)	73,743	58.70%	
Republican	Brian T. Kennedy	51,882	41.30%	
Total votes		125,625	100.00%	
Turnout		129,110	45.06%	
Democratic hold		Swing	{{{swing}}}	

== District 4 ==
1986 New Jersey's 4th congressional district election
- November 4, 1986
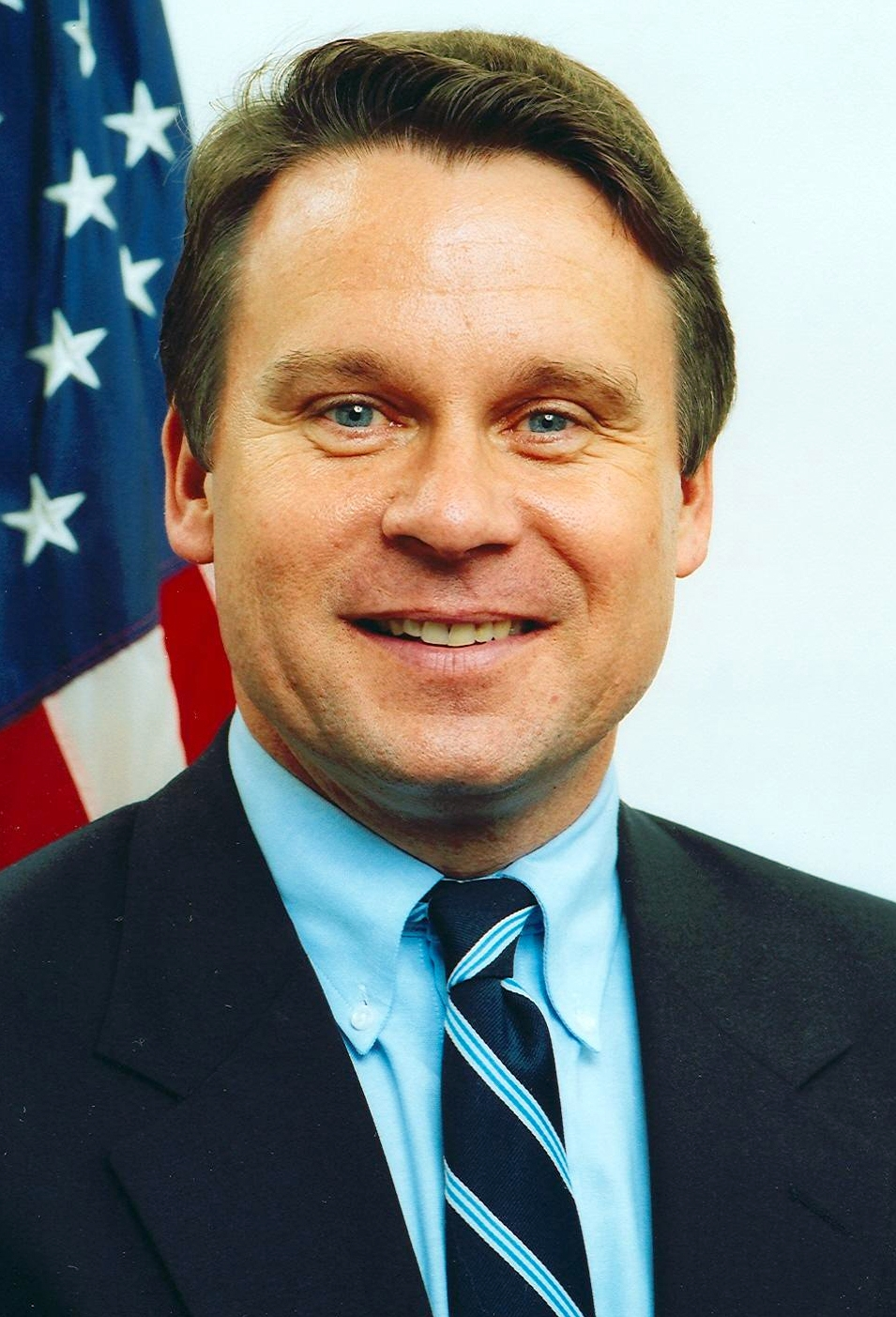

Nominee	Chris Smith	Jeffrey Laurenti
Party	Republican	Democratic
Popular vote	78,699	49,290
Percentage	61.1%	38.3%
U.S. Representative before election
Chris Smith
Republican
Elected U.S. Representative
Chris Smith
Republican

Incumbent Republican Chris Smith won. This district, in Central Jersey, consisted of parts of Burlington, Mercer, Middlesex, Monmouth and Ocean counties.

=== Republican primary ===
==== Candidates ====
- Chris Smith, incumbent Representative since 1981

==== Results ====
1986 Republican primary
Party	Candidate	Votes	%
Republican	Chris Smith (incumbent)	8,008	100.00%
Total votes		8,008	100.00%

=== Democratic primary ===
==== Candidates ====
- Stephen A. Koczak
- Jeffrey Laurenti, former executive director of the New Jersey Senate Democratic majority and candidate for this district in 1984

==== Results ====
1986 Democratic primary
Party	Candidate	Votes	%
Democratic	Jeffrey Laurenti	10,649	88.39%
Democratic	Stephen A. Koczak	1,399	11.61%
Total votes		12,048	100.00%

=== General election ===
==== Candidates ====
- Earl G. Dickey (Stop Financing Communism)
- Jeffrey Laurenti, former executive director of the New Jersey Senate Democratic majority (Democratic)
- Chris Smith, incumbent Representative since 1981 (Republican)

==== Campaign ====
The fourth district campaign was considered the bitterest of the election cycle.

==== Results ====
1986 U.S. House election
Party	Candidate	Votes	%	±%
Republican	Chris Smith (incumbent)	78,699	61.11%	
Democratic	Jeffrey Laurenti	49,290	38.28%	
Independent	Earl G. Dickey	789	0.61%	
Total votes		128,778	100.00%	
Turnout		132,360	45.35%	
Republican hold		Swing	{{{swing}}}	

== District 5 ==
1986 New Jersey's 5th congressional district election
- November 4, 1986
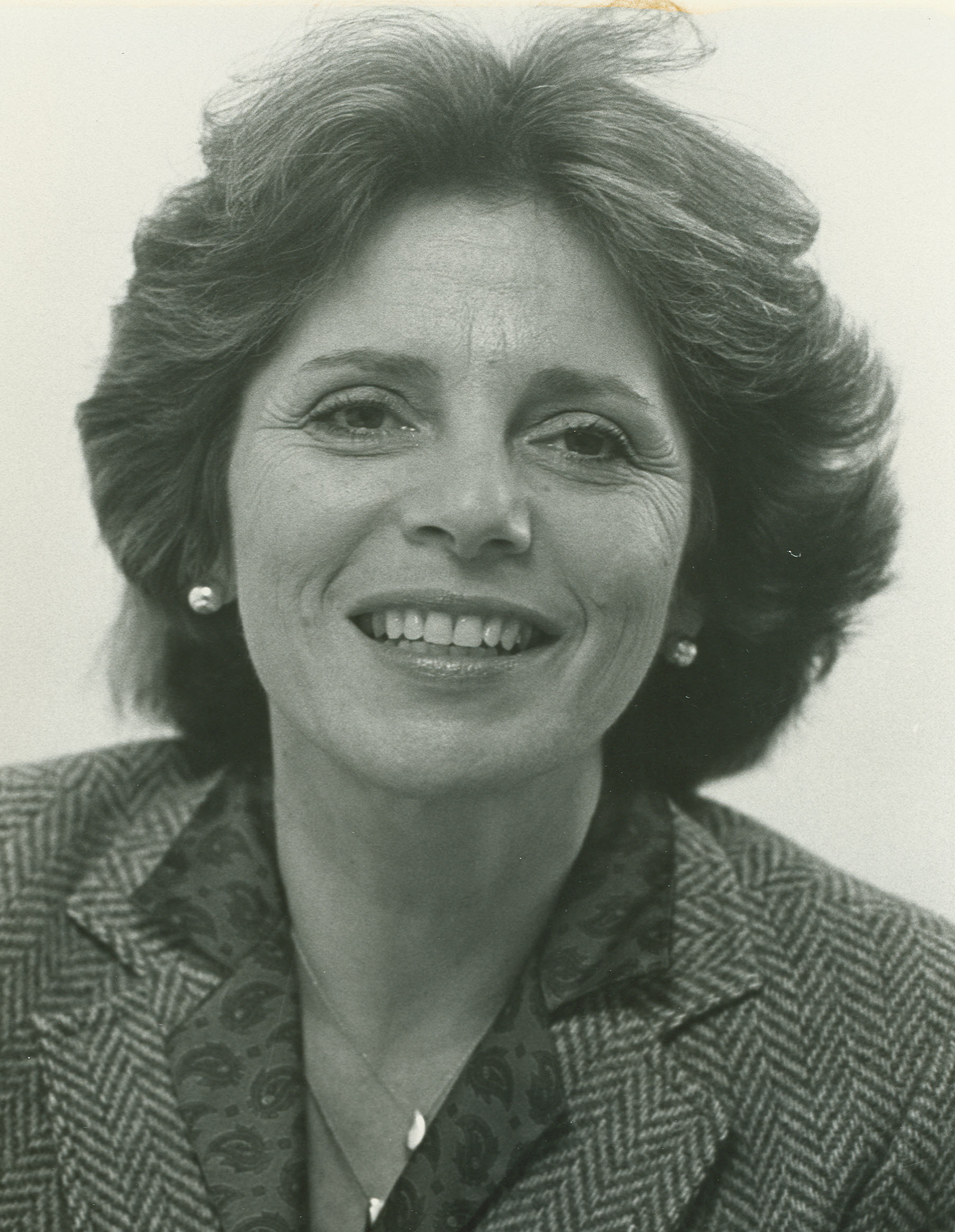

Nominee	Marge Roukema	H. Vernon Jolley
Party	Republican	Democratic
Popular vote	85,949	40,499
Percentage	68.0%	32.0%
U.S. Representative before election
Marge Roukema
Republican
Elected U.S. Representative
Marge Roukema
Republican

Incumbent Marge Roukema won. This district included parts of Bergen, Passaic, and Sussex counties.

=== Republican primary ===
==== Candidates ====
- William B. Grant, businessman, former member of the Montclair Township Commission and nominee for the eleventh district in 1974
- Marge Roukema, incumbent Representative from Ridgewood since 1981

==== Campaign ====
Grant challenged Roukema over fiscal issues, primarily her opposition to the Reagan administration's increased defense spending, arguing that his candidacy "[gave] Republican voters in the fifth district a choice between someone who supports the president on rebuilding national defense and someone who votes with the majority of Democrats against the majority of Republicans." He also criticized her vote in favor of the Boland Amendment, which restricted funding for the Nicaraguan Contra rebels and said he would have opposed the Gramm–Rudman–Hollings Balanced Budget Act and cuts to Social Security cost-of-living adjustments instead sought to reduce the deficit through domestic spending cuts, including the liquidation of the Amtrak passenger rail system.

==== Results ====
1986 Republican primary
Party	Candidate	Votes	%
Republican	Marge Roukema (incumbent)	15,048	74.97%
Republican	William B. Grant	5,023	25.03%
Total votes		20,071	100.00%

=== Democratic primary ===
==== Candidates ====
- Denise A. Ham, supporter of Lyndon LaRouche
- H. Vernon Jolley, Oradell lawyer

==== Results ====
1986 Democratic primary
Party	Candidate	Votes	%
Democratic	H. Vernon Jolley	6,353	83.37%
Democratic	Denise A. Ham	1,267	16.63%
Total votes		7,620	100.00%

=== General election ===
==== Candidates ====
- H. Vernon Jolley, Oradell lawyer (Democratic)
- Marge Roukema, incumbent Representative from Ridgewood since 1981 (Republican)

==== Results ====
1986 U.S. House election
Party	Candidate	Votes	%	±%
Republican	Marge Roukema (incumbent)	85,949	68.00%	
Democratic	H. Vernon Jolley	40,449	32.00%	
Total votes		126,398	100.00%	
Turnout		134,220	46.32%	
Republican hold		Swing	{{{swing}}}	

== District 6 ==
1986 New Jersey's 6th congressional district election
- November 4, 1986
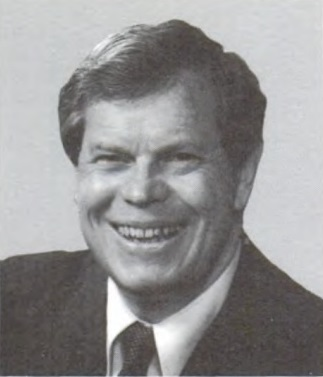

Nominee	Bernard J. Dwyer	John Scalamonti
Party	Democratic	Republican
Popular vote	67,460	28,286
Percentage	69.0%	28.9%
U.S. Representative before election
Bernard J. Dwyer
Democratic
Elected U.S. Representative
Bernard J. Dwyer
Democratic

Incumbent Democrat Bernard J. Dwyer won. This district included parts of Middlesex, Monmouth and Union counties.

=== Democratic primary ===
==== Candidates ====
- Anne DeGennaro
- Bernard J. Dwyer, incumbent Representative from Edison since 1981

==== Results ====
1986 Democratic primary
Party	Candidate	Votes	%
Democratic	Bernard J. Dwyer (incumbent)	20,918	87.53%
Democratic	Anne DeGennaro	2,981	12.47%
Total votes		23,899	100.00%

=== Republican primary ===
==== Candidates ====
- John D. Scalamonti
- Ernest L. Oros, member of the Woodbridge Township Council

==== Results ====
1986 Republican primary
Party	Candidate	Votes	%
Republican	John D. Scalamonti	2,439	58.63%
Republican	Ernest L. Oros	1,721	41.37%
Total votes		4,160	100.00%

=== General election ===
==== Candidates ====
- Bernard J. Dwyer, incumbent Representative from Edison since 1981 (Democratic)
- Rose Zeidwerg Monyek ("Inflation Fighting Housewife")
- John D. Scalamonti (Republican)

==== Results ====
1986 U.S. House election
Party	Candidate	Votes	%	±%
Democratic	Bernard J. Dwyer (incumbent)	67,460	69.00%	
Republican	John D. Scalamonti	28,286	28.93%	
Independent	Rose Zeidwerg Monyek	2,023	2.07%	
Total votes		97,769	100.00%	
Turnout		103,110	37.54%	
Democratic hold		Swing	{{{swing}}}	

== District 7 ==
1986 New Jersey's 7th congressional district election
- November 4, 1986
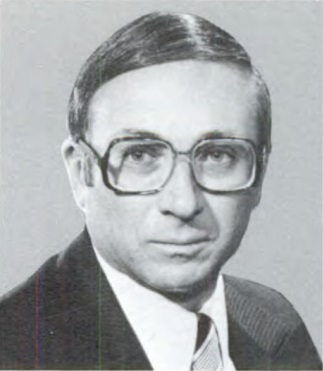

Nominee	Matt Rinaldo	June Fischer
Party	Republican	Democratic
Popular vote	92,254	24,462
Percentage	79.0%	21.0%
U.S. Representative before election
Matt Rinaldo
Republican
Elected U.S. Representative
Matt Rinaldo
Republican

Incumbent Matt Rinaldo won. This district included parts of Essex, Middlesex, Somerset, and Union counties.

=== Republican primary ===
==== Candidates ====
- Matt Rinaldo, incumbent Representative from Union since 1973

==== Results ====
1986 Republican primary
Party	Candidate	Votes	%
Republican	Matt Rinaldo (incumbent)	10,541	100.00%
Total votes		10,541	100.00%

=== Democratic primary ===
==== Candidates ====
- James J. Cleary, supporter of Lyndon LaRouche
- June S. Fischer, member of the Democratic National Committee

==== Results ====
1986 Democratic primary
Party	Candidate	Votes	%
Democratic	June S. Fischer	9,799	86.41%
Democratic	James J. Cleary	1,541	13.59%
Total votes		11,340	100.00%

=== General election ===
==== Candidates ====
- June S. Fischer, member of the Democratic National Committee (Democratic)
- Matt Rinaldo, incumbent Representative from Union since 1973 (Republican)

==== Results ====
1986 U.S. House election
Party	Candidate	Votes	%	±%
Republican	Matt Rinaldo (incumbent)	92,254	79.04%	
Democratic	June S. Fischer	24,462	20.96%	
Total votes		116,716	100.00%	
Republican hold		Swing	{{{swing}}}	

== District 8 ==
1986 New Jersey's 8th congressional district election
- November 4, 1986
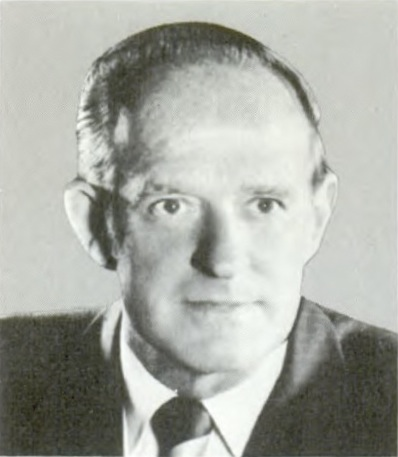

Nominee	Robert A. Roe	Thomas Zampino
Party	Democratic	Republican
Popular vote	57,820	34,269
Percentage	62.8%	37.2%
U.S. Representative before election
Robert A. Roe
Democratic
Elected U.S. Representative
Robert A. Roe
Democratic

Incumbent Robert Roe won without opposition. This district included parts of Bergen, Essex, Morris and Passaic counties.

=== Democratic primary ===
==== Candidates ====
- Arthur Fairchild, supporter of Lyndon LaRouche
- Robert A. Roe, incumbent Representative from Wayne since 1969

==== Results ====
1986 Democratic primary
Party	Candidate	Votes	%
Democratic	Robert A. Roe (incumbent)	13,782	95.76%
Democratic	Arthur Fairchild	610	4.24%
Total votes		14,392	100.00%

=== Republican primary ===
==== Candidates ====
- Ronald Ruise
- Thomas P. Zampino, Belleville lawyer

==== Results ====
1986 Republican primary
Party	Candidate	Votes	%
Republican	Thomas P. Zampino	6,699	85.19%
Republican	Ronald Ruise	1,165	14.81%
Total votes		7,864	100.00%

=== General election ===
==== Candidates ====
- Robert A. Roe, incumbent Representative from Wayne since 1969 (Democratic)
- Thomas P. Zampino, Belleville lawyer (Republican)

==== Results ====
1986 U.S. House election
Party	Candidate	Votes	%	±%
Democratic	Robert A. Roe (incumbent)	57,820	62.79%	
Republican	Thomas P. Zampino	34,269	37.21%	
Total votes		92,089	100.00%	
Democratic hold		Swing	{{{swing}}}	

== District 9 ==
1986 New Jersey's 9th congressional district election
- November 4, 1986
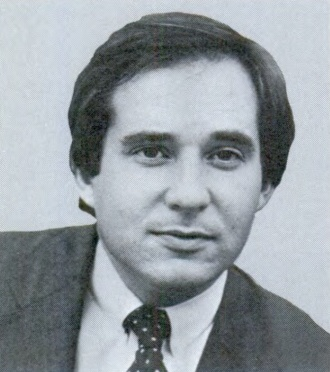

Nominee	Bob Torricelli	Arthur F. Jones
Party	Democratic	Republican
Popular vote	89,634	40,226
Percentage	69.0%	31.0%
U.S. Representative before election
Bob Torricelli
Democratic
Elected U.S. Representative
Bob Torricelli
Democratic

Incumbent Democrat Bob Torricelli won. This district consisted of parts of Bergen and Hudson counties.

=== Democratic primary ===
==== Candidates ====
- Elliot Greenspan, supporter of Lyndon LaRouche
- Bob Torricelli, incumbent Representative from Englewood since 1983

==== Results ====
1986 Democratic primary
Party	Candidate	Votes	%
Democratic	Robert G. Torricelli (incumbent)	14,201	96.47%
Democratic	Elliot Greenspan	520	3.53%
Total votes		14,721	100.00%

=== Republican primary ===
==== Candidates ====
- Arthur F. Jones, Bergen County Freeholder

==== Results ====
1986 Republican primary
Party	Candidate	Votes	%
Republican	Arthur F. Jones	6,265	100.00%
Total votes		6,265	100.00%

=== General election ===
==== Candidates ====
- Arthur F. Jones, Bergen County Freeholder (Republican)
- Bob Torricelli, incumbent Representative from Englewood since 1983 (Democratic)

==== Results ====
1986 U.S. House election
Party	Candidate	Votes	%	±%
Democratic	Bob Torricelli (incumbent)	89,634	69.02%	
Republican	Arthur F. Jones	40,226	30.98%	
Total votes		129,860	100.00%	
Democratic hold		Swing	{{{swing}}}	

== District 10 ==
1986 New Jersey's 10th congressional district election
- November 4, 1986
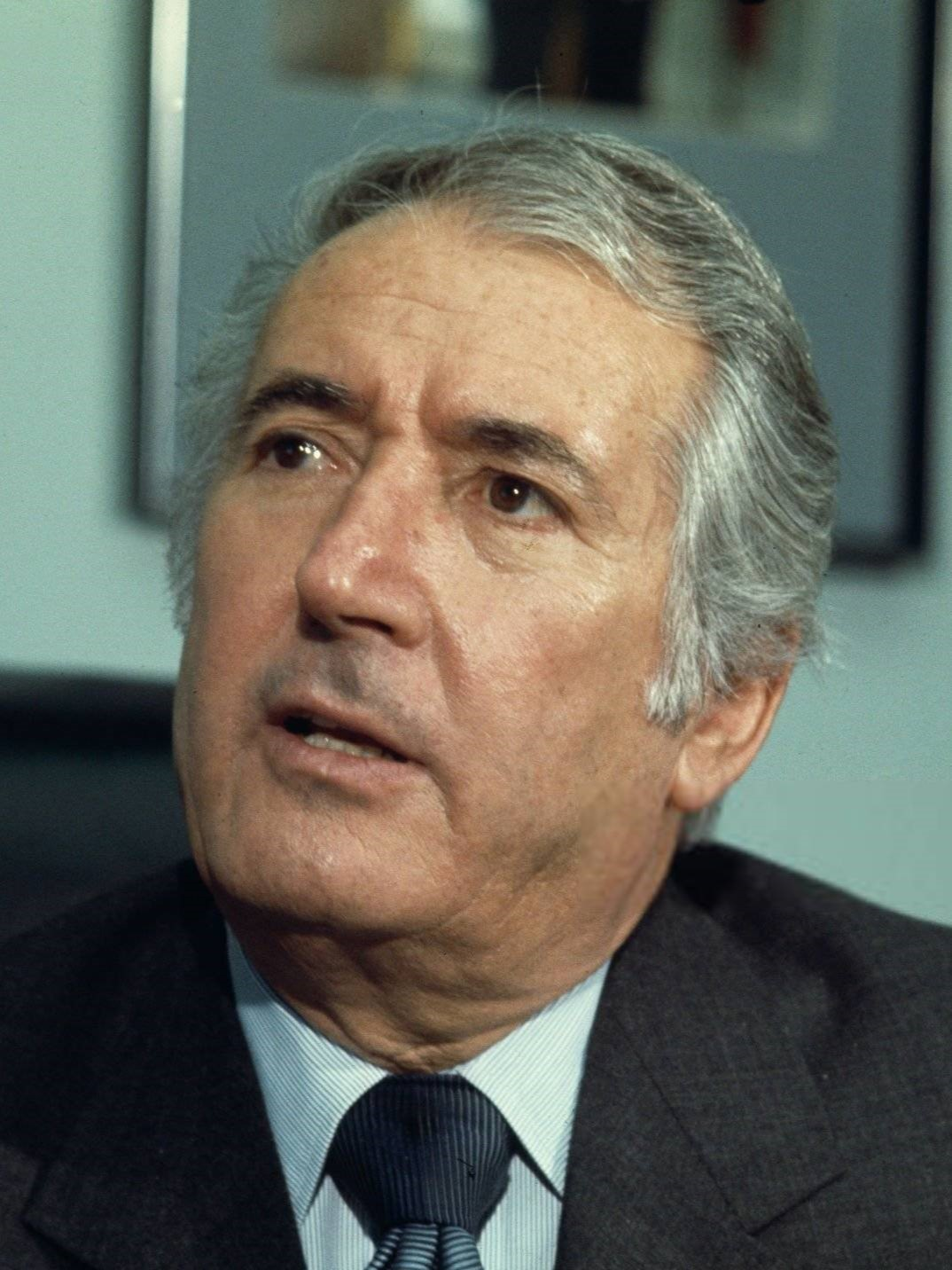

Nominee	Peter W. Rodino	Chris Brandlon
Party	Democratic	Socialist Workers
Popular vote	46,666	1,977
Percentage	95.9%	4.1%
U.S. Representative before election
Peter W. Rodino
Democratic
Elected U.S. Representative
Peter W. Rodino
Democratic

Incumbent Democrat Peter W. Rodino won. The district included parts of Essex and Union counties.

=== Democratic primary ===
==== Candidates ====
- A. Pearl Hart, supporter of Lyndon LaRouche
- Arthur S. Jones
- Donald M. Payne, member of the Newark City Council and candidate for this district in 1980
- Peter W. Rodino, incumbent Representative since 1949

==== Results ====
1986 Democratic primary
Party	Candidate	Votes	%
Democratic	Peter W. Rodino (incumbent)	25,138	59.50%
Democratic	Donald M. Payne	15,216	35.80%
Democratic	A. Pearl Hart	967	2.29%
Democratic	Arthur S. Jones	931	2.20%
Total votes		42,252	100.00%

=== Republican primary ===
==== Candidates ====
- Alvin K. Terry

==== Results ====
1986 Republican primary
Party	Candidate	Votes	%
Republican	Alvin K. Terry	1,939	100.00%
Total votes		1,939	100.00%

After the primary, Terry withdrew his name from the general election ballot.

=== General election ===
==== Candidates ====
- Chris Brandlon (Socialist Workers)
- Peter W. Rodino, incumbent Representative since 1949 (Democratic)

===== Withdrew =====
- Alvin K. Terry (Republican)

==== Results ====
1986 U.S. House election
Party	Candidate	Votes	%	±%
Democratic	Peter W. Rodino (incumbent)	46,666	95.94%	
Socialist Workers	Chris Brandlon	1,977	4.06%	
Total votes		48,643	100.00%	
Democratic hold		Swing	{{{swing}}}	

== District 11 ==
1986 New Jersey's 11th congressional district election
- November 4, 1986
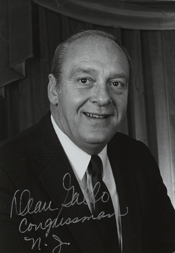

Nominee	Dean Gallo	Frank Askin
Party	Republican	Democratic
Popular vote	75,037	35,280
Percentage	68.0%	32.0%
U.S. Representative before election
Dean Gallo
Republican
Elected U.S. Representative
Dean Gallo
Republican

Incumbent Republican Dean Gallo won. This district consisted of parts of Essex, Morris, Sussex and Warren counties.

=== Republican primary ===
==== Candidates ====
- Dean Gallo, incumbent Representative since 1985
- Kevin E. Reid

==== Results ====
1986 Republican primary
Party	Candidate	Votes	%
Republican	Dean Gallo (incumbent)	14,806	86.73%
Republican	Kevin E. Reid	2,266	13.27%
Total votes		17,072	100.00%

=== Democratic primary ===
==== Candidates ====
- Frank Askin, West Orange attorney and civil rights activist
- Mary Frueholz, supporter of Lyndon LaRouche

==== Results ====
1986 Democratic primary
Party	Candidate	Votes	%
Democratic	Frank Askin	10,399	88.99%
Democratic	Mary Frueholz	1,287	11.01%
Total votes		11,686	100.00%

=== General election ===
==== Candidates ====
- Frank Askin, West Orange attorney and civil rights activist (Democratic)
- Dean Gallo, incumbent Representative since 1985 (Republican)

==== Results ====
1986 U.S. House election
Party	Candidate	Votes	%	±%
Republican	Dean Gallo (incumbent)	75,037	68.02%	
Democratic	Frank Askin	35,280	31.98%	
Total votes		110,317	100.00%	
Republican hold		Swing	{{{swing}}}	

== District 12 ==
1986 New Jersey's 12th congressional district election
- November 4, 1986
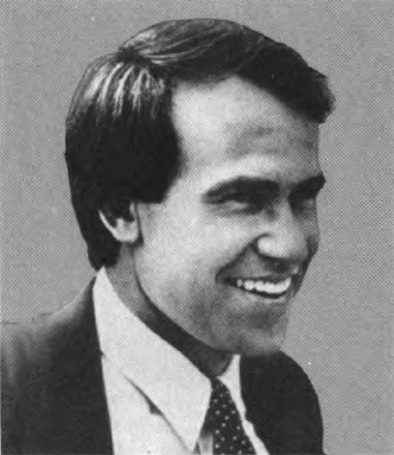

Nominee	Jim Courter	David Crabiel
Party	Republican	Democratic
Popular vote	72,966	41,967
Percentage	63.5%	36.5%
U.S. Representative before election
Jim Courter
Republican
Elected U.S. Representative
Jim Courter
Republican

Incumbent Republican Jim Courter won. This sprawling district included all of Hunterdon County and parts of Mercer, Middlesex, Morris, Somerset, Sussex, and Warren counties.

=== Republican primary ===
==== Candidates ====
- Jim Courter, incumbent Representative since 1979

==== Results ====
1986 Republican primary
Party	Candidate	Votes	%
Republican	Jim Courter (incumbent)	15,037	100.00%
Total votes		15,037	100.00%

=== Democratic primary ===
==== Candidates ====
- David Crabiel, Middlesex County Freeholder and candidate for the fourth district in 1974
- Richard Forbes, supporter of Lyndon LaRouche

==== Results ====
1986 Democratic primary
Party	Candidate	Votes	%
Democratic	David Crabiel	7,774	82.80%
Democratic	Richard Forbes	1,615	17.20%
Total votes		9,389	100.00%

=== General election ===
==== Candidates ====
- David Crabiel, Middlesex County Freeholder and candidate for the fourth district in 1974 (Democratic)
- Jim Courter, incumbent Representative since 1979 (Republican)

==== Results ====
1986 U.S. House election
Party	Candidate	Votes	%	±%
Republican	Jim Courter (incumbent)	72,966	63.49%	
Democratic	David Crabiel	41,967	36.51%	
Total votes		114,933	100.00%	
Republican hold		Swing	{{{swing}}}	

== District 13 ==
1986 New Jersey's 13th congressional district election
- November 4, 1986
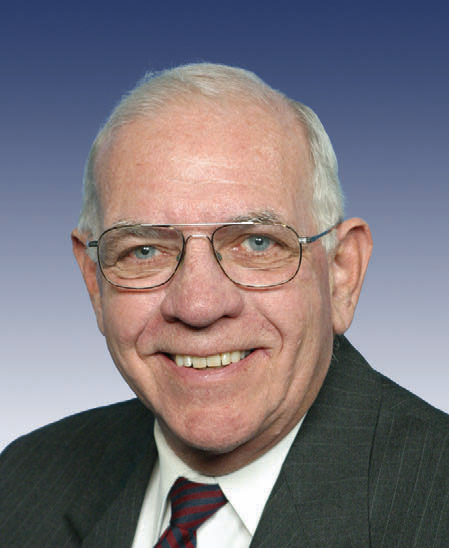

Nominee	Jim Saxton	John Wydra
Party	Republican	Democratic
Popular vote	82,866	43,920
Percentage	65.4%	34.6%
U.S. Representative before election
Jim Saxton
Republican
Elected U.S. Representative
Jim Saxton
Republican

Incumbent Republican Jim Saxton won. This district included parts of Burlington, Camden, and Ocean counties.

=== Republican primary ===
==== Candidates ====
- Jim Saxton, incumbent Representative since 1984

==== Results ====
1986 Republican primary
Party	Candidate	Votes	%
Republican	Jim Saxton (incumbent)	16,928	100.00%
Total votes		16,928	100.00%

=== Democratic primary ===
==== Candidates ====
- Eugene Allan Creech
- Charles M. Grigley, supporter of Lyndon LaRouche
- John Wydra, Cherry Hill radio newscaster

==== Results ====
1986 Democratic primary
Party	Candidate	Votes	%
Democratic	John Wydra	10,042	91.35%
Democratic	Charles M. Grigley	680	6.19%
Democratic	Eugene Allan Creech	271	2.47%
Total votes		10,993	100.00%

=== General election ===
==== Candidates ====
- Jim Saxton, incumbent Representative since 1984 (Republican)
- John Wydra, Cherry Hill radio newscaster (Democratic)

==== Results ====
1986 U.S. House election
Party	Candidate	Votes	%	±%
Republican	Jim Saxton (incumbent)	82,866	65.36%	
Democratic	John Wydra	43,920	34.64%	
Total votes		126,786	100.00%	
Republican hold		Swing	{{{swing}}}	

== District 14 ==
1986 New Jersey's 14th congressional district election
- November 4, 1986
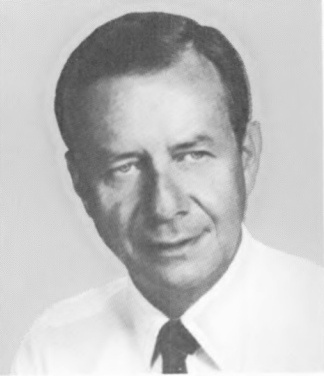

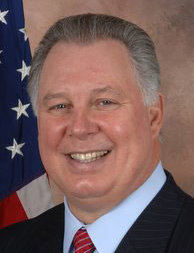
Nominee	Frank Guarini	Albio Sires
Party	Democratic	Republican
Popular vote	63,057	23,822
Percentage	70.7%	26.7%
U.S. Representative before election
Frank J. Guarini
Democratic
Elected U.S. Representative
Frank J. Guarini
Democratic

Incumbent Democrat Frank J. Guarini won. This district included parts Hudson County.

=== Democratic primary ===
==== Candidates ====
- Frank J. Guarini, incumbent Representative since 1979
- Herbert D. Smith, supporter of Lyndon LaRouche
- Marie R. Vaughan

==== Results ====
1986 Democratic primary
Party	Candidate	Votes	%
Democratic	Frank J. Guarini (incumbent)	30,043	87.42%
Democratic	Marie R. Vaughan	3,844	11.19%
Democratic	Herbert D. Smith	479	1.39%
Total votes		34,366	100.00%

=== Republican primary ===
==== Candidates ====
- Octavio Alfonso
- Albio Sires, Memorial High School teacher

==== Results ====
1986 Republican primary
Party	Candidate	Votes	%
Republican	Albio Sires	3,203	56.96%
Republican	Octavio Alonso	2,420	43.04%
Total votes		5,623	100.00%

=== General election ===
==== Candidates ====
- Frank J. Guarini, incumbent Representative since 1979 (Democratic)
- William Link ("Let Freedom Ring")
- Herbert Shaw, perennial candidate (Port Authority = Crooks)
- Albio Sires, Memorial High School teacher (Republican)

==== Campaign ====
In part to aid Sires, the National Republican Committee funded a $20,000 Hispanic voter registration drive in the district.

==== Results ====
1986 U.S. House election
Party	Candidate	Votes	%	±%
Democratic	Frank J. Guarini (incumbent)	63,057	70.67%	
Republican	Albio Sires	23,822	26.70%	
Independent	Herbert Shaw	1,825	2.05%	
Independent	William Link	525	0.59%	
Total votes		89,229	100.00%	
Democratic hold		Swing	{{{swing}}}	

In 1995, Sires was elected mayor of West New York as an independent before switching to the Democratic Party. He was elected to the New Jersey General Assembly in 1999 and represented the equivalent of this district in Congress from a 2006 special election until leaving office in 2023. In the 2006 race, Sires ironically defeated a Republican named John J. Guarini.
