= Askin =

Askin is a surname. Notable people with the surname include:

- Ambrose Askin, British rugby player
- Frank Askin, professor and activist
- John Askin (1739–1815), fur trader in Canada
- John Askin Jr. (c. 1765 – 1820), fur trader and government official in Canada; son of John
- Leon Askin, Austrian actor
- Matty Askin, British boxer
- Peter Askin (born 1940), American director and screenwriter
- Robert Askin, Australian politician
- Stephen Askin, inventor of the deely bobber
- Tom Askin, British rugby player

== See also ==
- Askin, Iran, a village in Markazi Province, Iran
- Eskin-e Olya, Iran
- Eskin-e Sofla, Iran
