= Takaneh =

Takaneh (Persian: تاكانه or تكانه) may refer to:

- Takaneh, Kermanshah (تاكانه - Tākāneh)
- Takaneh, Lorestan (تكانه - Takāneh)
