= Damgar =

Damgar دمگر
- Village
- Location within Iran
- Coordinates: 33°30′06″N 48°31′10″E
- Country: Iran
- Province: Lorestan
- County: Khorramabad
- Bakhsh: Central
- Rural District: Dehpir-e Shomali

Population (2006)
  - Total: 79
- Time zone: UTC+3:30 (IRST)
  - Summer (DST): UTC+4:30 (IRDT)

Damgar (Persian: دمگر, also known as Damgar-e Hūlāndasht) is a village in Dehpir-e Shomali Rural District, in the Central District of Khorramabad County, Lorestan Province, Iran. At the 2006 census, its population was 79 across 18 families.
