= A Note To You =

A Note To You was a radio show featuring classical music, broadcast from 1963 to 2000 from Ryder Hall at Northeastern University, Boston. A Note to You was started by the founder of the university's music department founder, Roland Nadeau, who created the show in the interest of educating children on classical music. Initially, the show was broadcast on WHDH but moved to broadcast on WGBH-FM, eventually on more than 160 stations. At its peak, the show was also internationally syndicated to networks such as the Armed Forces Radio and Australian Public Radio.

The show was created with the intent to educate children on classical music, but A Note to You subsequently "grew into a family show where Professor Nadeau would lecture and interview guests and use music to enhance his ideas". Each episode centered on a theme and featured live performance with discussion and commentary, with Nadeau seeking to present in a non-elitist style.

== Hosts ==
=== Roland Nadeau ===
Roland Nadeau founded and hosted A Note to You for 34 years before his death in 1997.

=== Virginia Eskin ===
Pianist Virginia Eskin was a frequent Note to You guest, until she succeeded Nadeau as host in 1998. She was a Visiting Artist in Northeastern University's Department of Music in 2007.

== Timeline ==
1963	Show is broadcast on WHDH
1973	Moves to WGBH
1978	War! is broadcast
1980	Northeastern begins to coproduce A Note to You
1985	Virginia Eskin comes on as co-host
1991	"Which Way's Witch? A June Foray Halloween Spell" is broadcast
1992	"The Sound in the Fury" is broadcast
1997	Roland Nadeau dies
1998	Virginia Eskin becomes host
2000	Show is retired

== See also ==
- Northeastern University
- WGBH-FM
- WGDH

== Bibliography ==
- Archives and Special Collections, Northeastern University Libraries (1975–98), A Note To You Finding Aid, Boston: Northeastern University Libraries
- Northeastern University Professor's Radio Series Wins Prestigious Award, Boston: Northeastern University News, 2007
- Dyer, Richard (1986), TALKING TO: VIRGINIA ESKIN; 'WOMAN COMPOSER HAS COME OF AGE', Boston: Boston Globe, ProQuest 294353467
- Media Artist, 2014
- Long, Tom (1997), Music Scholar Roland Nadeau, 69; Hosted WGBH-FM's 'A Note to You', Boston: Boston Globe, ProQuest 403880033
- Miller, Margo (1984), MARQUEE; A RADIO INSTITUTION, ROLAND NADEAU BRINGS BEAUTY TO THE HAVE-NOTS, Boston: Boston Globe, ProQuest 294339072
- Manning, Michael (1997), Musician and Longtime Voice of a 'Note to You', Boston: Boston Globe, ProQuest 403881488
- Cariani, Karen; Ide, Mary (2007), The WGBH Media Library and Archives Assessment for Scholarly Use (PDF), Boston: WGBH Media Library and Archives, pp. 50–51, archived from the original (PDF) on June 16, 2014, "In addition to broadcasting music, WGBH radio has also investigated other music programming concepts, including ... music appreciation through A Note to You with Roland Nadeau and Virginia Eskin ...."
- Fybush, Scott (1997), "More Fun with CBS and ARS", North East RadioWatch, no. September 25, 1997, "Three Boston radio voices were silenced this past week. Roland Nadeau, the longtime host of 'A Note to You' on WGBH (89.7), died of cancer at his West Bridgewater home on Monday. Nadeau founded the music department at Bridgewater State College, and hosted 'A Note to You' for 34 years, first on WHDH and later on WGBH and many other public radio stations. Nadeau was 69."
- Long, Tom (1997), "Music scholar Roland Nadeau, 69; hosted WGBH-FM's 'A Note to You'", Boston Globe, no. September 23, 1997
