= Tang-e Namak =

Tang-e Namak تنگ نمك
- Village
- Location within Iran
- Coordinates: 33°32′50″N 48°28′36″E
- Country: Iran
- Province: Lorestan
- County: Khorramabad
- Bakhsh: Central
- Rural District: Dehpir-e Shomali

Population (2006)
  - Total: 315
- Time zone: UTC+3:30 (IRST)
  - Summer (DST): UTC+4:30 (IRDT)

Tang-e Namak (Persian: تنگ نمك, also Romanized as Tang-i-Namak; also known as Rok Rok and Rok Rok Tang-e Namak) is a village in Dehpir-e Shomali Rural District, in the Central District of Khorramabad County, Lorestan Province, Iran. At the 2006 census, its population was 315, in 72 families.
