= Darreh Saki-ye Sofla =

Village in Lorestan, Iran

Darreh Saki-ye Sofla دره ساكي سفلي
- Village
- Location within Iran
- Coordinates: 33°33′16″N 48°28′11″E
- Country: Iran
- Province: Lorestan
- County: Khorramabad
- Bakhsh: Central
- Rural District: Dehpir-e Shomali

Population (2006)
  - Total: 169
- Time zone: UTC+3:30 (IRST)
  - Summer (DST): UTC+4:30 (IRDT)

Darreh Saki-ye Sofla (Persian: دره ساكي سفلي, also Romanized as Darreh Sākī-ye Soflá) is a village in Dehpir-e Shomali Rural District, in the Central District of Khorramabad County, Lorestan Province, Iran. At the 2006 census, its population was 169, in 34 families.
