= Badiyeh-ye Yek =

Village in Lorestan, Iran

Badiyeh-ye Yek باديه يك
- Village
- Location within Iran
- Coordinates: 33°34′06″N 48°24′41″E
- Country: Iran
- Province: Lorestan
- County: Khorramabad
- Bakhsh: Central
- Rural District: Dehpir-e Shomali

Population (2006)
  - Total: 31
- Time zone: UTC+3:30 (IRST)
  - Summer (DST): UTC+4:30 (IRDT)

Badiyeh-ye Yek (Persian: باديه يك, also Romanized as Bādīyeh-ye Yek and Bādīyeh Yek; also known as Bādeyeh and Bādīyeh) is a village in Dehpir-e Shomali Rural District, in the Central District of Khorramabad County, Lorestan Province, Iran. At the 2006 census, its population was 31, in 8 families.
