= Badiyeh-ye Do =

Badiyeh-ye Do باديه دو
- Village
- Location within Iran
- Coordinates: 33°33′52″N 48°24′31″E
- Country: Iran
- Province: Lorestan
- County: Khorramabad
- Bakhsh: Central
- Rural District: Dehpir-e Shomali

Population (2006)
  - Total: 76
- Time zone: UTC+3:30 (IRST)
  - Summer (DST): UTC+4:30 (IRDT)

Badiyeh-ye Do (Persian: باديه دو, also Romanized as Bādīyeh-ye Do) is a village in Dehpir-e Shomali Rural District, in the Central District of Khorramabad County, Lorestan Province, Iran. At the 2006 census, its population was 76, in 20 families.
