= Mirabad, Khorramabad =

Village in Lorestan province, Iran

Mirabad Persian: ميراباد
- Village
- Location within Iran
- Coordinates: 33°30′54″N 48°26′46″E
- Country: Iran
- Province: Lorestan
- County: Khorramabad
- District: Central
- Rural District: Dehpir-e Shomali

Population (2016)
  - Total: 342
- Time zone: UTC+3:30 (IRST)

Mirabad (Persian: ميراباد) (Note: Also romanized as Mīrābād) is a village in Dehpir-e Shomali Rural District of the Central District in Khorramabad County, Lorestan province, Iran.

== Demographics ==
=== Population ===
At the time of the 2006 National Census, the village's population was 310 in 65 households. The following census in 2011 counted 284 people in 72 households. The 2016 census measured the population of the village as 342 people in 102 households.
