= Hulandasht =

Village in Lorestan province, Iran

Hulandasht Persian: هولاندشت
- Village
- Location within Iran
- Coordinates: 33°30′37″N 48°30′44″E
- Country: Iran
- Province: Lorestan
- County: Khorramabad
- District: Central
- Rural District: Dehpir-e Shomali

Population (2016)
  - Total: 459
- Time zone: UTC+3:30 (IRST)

Hulandasht (Persian: هولاندشت) (Note: Also romanized as Hūlāndasht; also known as ‘Alamdasht, Halamdasht, Holon Dasht, Holūn Dasht, and Holūndasht) is a village in Dehpir-e Shomali Rural District of the Central District in Khorramabad County, Lorestan province, Iran.

== Demographics ==
=== Population ===
At the time of the 2006 National Census, the village's population was 390 in 82 households. The following census in 2011 counted 421 people in 116 households. The 2016 census measured the population of the village as 459 people in 120 households.
