= Darreh Saki-ye Olya =

Village in Lorestan, Iran

Darreh Saki-ye Olya دره ساكي عليا
- Village
- Location within Iran
- Coordinates: 33°33′28″N 48°28′07″E
- Country: Iran
- Province: Lorestan
- County: Khorramabad
- Bakhsh: Central
- Rural District: Dehpir-e Shomali

Population (2006)
  - Total: 155
- Time zone: UTC+3:30 (IRST)
  - Summer (DST): UTC+4:30 (IRDT)

Darreh Saki-ye Olya (Persian: دره ساكي عليا, also Romanized as Darreh Sākī-ye ‘Olyā; also known as Darreh Sākī and Darreh Sāqī) is a village in Dehpir-e Shomali Rural District, in the Central District (Khorramabad County), Lorestan Province, Iran. At the 2006 census, its population was 155, in 37 families.
