= Tajareh Sadat =

Tajareh Sadat تجره سادات
- Village
- Location within Iran
- Coordinates: 33°29′20″N 48°28′21″E
- Country: Iran
- Province: Lorestan
- County: Khorramabad
- Bakhsh: Central
- Rural District: Dehpir-e Shomali

Population (2006)
  - Total: 289
- Time zone: UTC+3:30 (IRST)
  - Summer (DST): UTC+4:30 (IRDT)

Tajareh Sadat (Persian: تجره سادات, also Romanized as Tajareh Sādāt; also known as Tajareh, Tajareh-ye Seyyed, Tajareh-ye Seyyedā, Tāzeh Rah, and Tāzerāh) is a village in Dehpir-e Shomali Rural District, in the Central District of Khorramabad County, Lorestan Province, Iran. At the 2006 census, its population was 289, in 71 families.
