= Garab, Khorramabad =

Village in Lorestan province, Iran

Garab Persian: گراب
- Village
- Location within Iran
- Coordinates: 33°29′07″N 48°29′24″E
- Country: Iran
- Province: Lorestan
- County: Khorramabad
- District: Central
- Rural District: Dehpir-e Shomali

Population (2016)
  - Total: 599
- Time zone: UTC+3:30 (IRST)

Garab (Persian: گراب) (Note: Also romanized as Garāb and Garrāb; also known as Garrūp) is a village in Dehpir-e Shomali Rural District of the Central District in Khorramabad County, Lorestan province, Iran.

== Demographics ==
=== Population ===
At the time of the 2006 National Census, the village's population was 495 in 105 households. The following census in 2011 counted 575 people in 155 households. The 2016 census measured the population of the village as 599 people in 169 households, the most populous in its rural district.
