= Badiyeh-ye Seh =

Badiyeh-ye Seh باديه سه
- Village
- Location within Iran
- Coordinates: 33°33′44″N 48°23′55″E
- Country: Iran
- Province: Lorestan
- County: Khorramabad
- Bakhsh: Central
- Rural District: Dehpir-e Shomali

Population (2006)
  - Total: 169
- Time zone: UTC+3:30 (IRST)
  - Summer (DST): UTC+4:30 (IRDT)

Badiyeh-ye Seh (Persian: باديه سه, also Romanized as Bādīyeh-ye Seh) is a village in Dehpir-e Shomali Rural District, in the Central District of Khorramabad County, Lorestan Province, Iran. At the 2006 census, its population was 169, in 39 families.
