= Khan Jan Khani =

Village in Lorestan province, Iran

Khan Jan Khani Persian: خانجان خاني
- Village
- Location within Iran
- Coordinates: 33°32′05″N 48°26′23″E
- Country: Iran
- Province: Lorestan
- County: Khorramabad
- District: Central
- Rural District: Dehpir-e Shomali

Population (2016)
  - Total: 483
- Time zone: UTC+3:30 (IRST)

Khan Jan Khani (Persian: خانجان خاني) (Note: Also romanized as Khān Jān Khānī) is a village in Dehpir-e Shomali Rural District of the Central District in Khorramabad County, Lorestan province, Iran.

== Demographics ==
=== Population ===
At the time of the 2006 National Census, the village's population was 512 in 105 households. The following census in 2011 counted 480 people in 118 households. The 2016 census measured the population of the village as 483 people in 139 households.
