= Julius Ashkin =

American nuclear physicist (1920–1982)

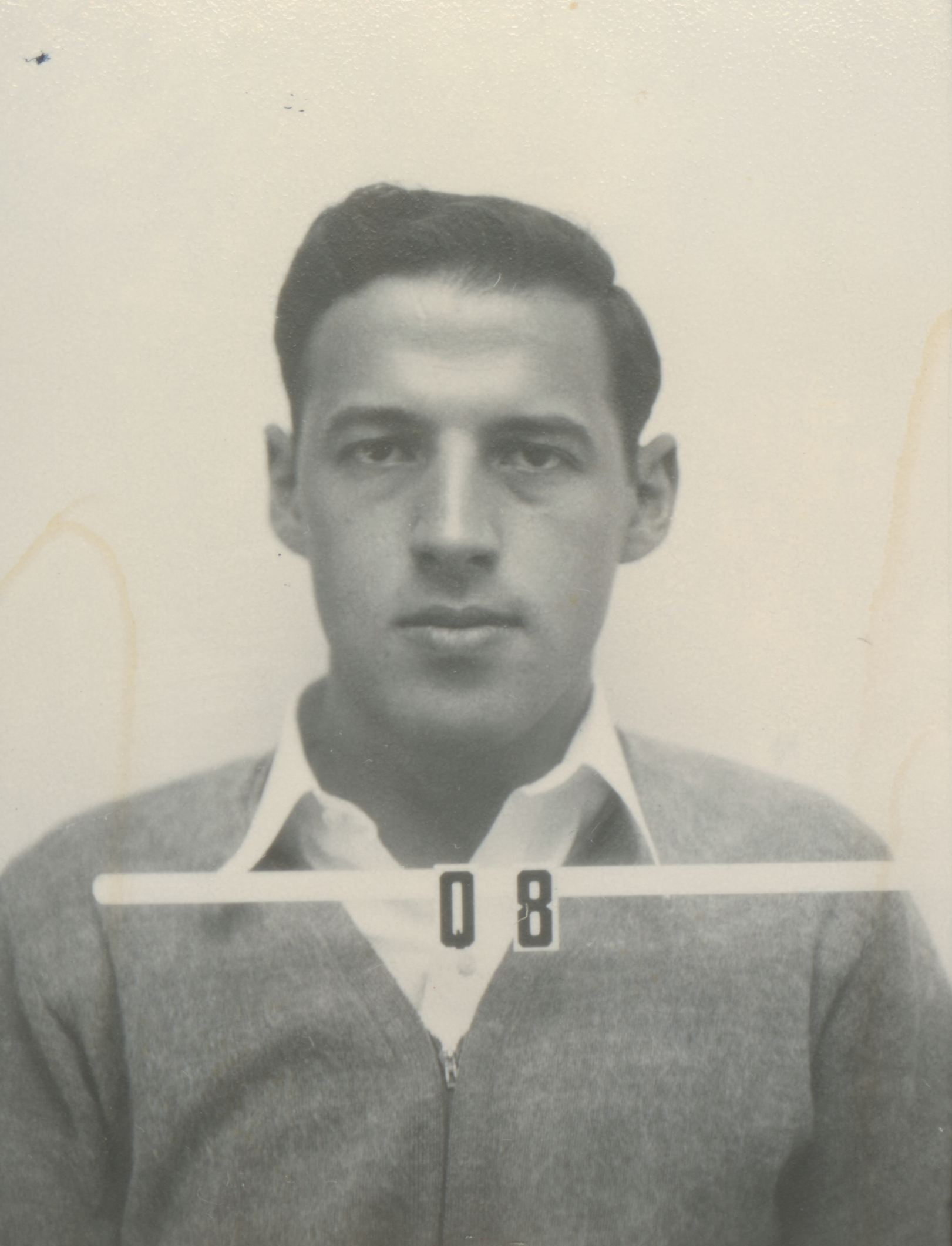
- Julius Ashkin's Los Alamos ID badge
- Born: August 23, 1920; Brooklyn, New York
- Died: June 4, 1982 (aged 61); Pittsburgh, Pennsylvania
- Citizenship: United States
- Education: Columbia University
- Known for: Ashkin–Teller model
- Awards: Guggenheim Fellowship (1968)
- Scientific career
- Fields: Physics
- Workplaces: Metallurgical Laboratory; Los Alamos Laboratory; University of Rochester; Carnegie Mellon University
- Thesis: Two problems in the statistical mechanics of crystals. I. The propagation of order in crystal lattices II. The statistics of two-dimensional lattices with four components. (1943)
- Doctoral advisor: Willis Lamb

Julius Ashkin (August 23, 1920 – June 4, 1982) was a leader in experimental and theoretical physics known for furthering the evolution of particle physics from nuclear physics. As a theoretical physicist he made contributions in the fields of statistical mechanics, solid state physics, nuclear physics, and elementary particle physics. As an experimental physicist his main contributions concerned the passage of certain particles (pi-mesons, or pions) through solid matter and their subsequent decay. He was recognized for the quality of his research and teaching.

== Early life and family ==
Julius Ashkin was born in Brooklyn, New York, on August 23, 1920. His parents were Isadore and Anna Ashkin. He had two younger siblings, a brother, Arthur, also a physicist, and a sister, Ruth. One older sibling, Gertrude, died while young. The family home was in Brooklyn, New York, at 983 E 27 Street. Isadore had immigrated to the United States from Odessa, Ukraine at the age of 19. Anna, five years younger, also came from Ukraine (in her case Galicia). Within a decade of his landing in New York, Isadore had become a U.S. citizen and was running a dental laboratory at 139 Delancey Street in Manhattan. Ashkin's nickname was Julie. He is the uncle of the artist Michael Ashkin.

== Education ==
Ashkin attended Brooklyn's James Madison High School, graduating in 1936, while still a few weeks shy of his 16th birthday. In his senior year, he received honors and awards. He was awarded a scholarship to attend Columbia University, where he studied four years as an undergraduate from 1936 to 1940, and three as a graduate from 1940 to 1943.

Physicists then working on Columbia's faculty in those years included professors Enrico Fermi, Isidor Isaac Rabi, Hans Bethe (visiting), Edward Teller (visiting), and instructors Arnold Nordsieck, Hugh Paxton, and Willis Lamb. All these men were recognized as among the finest of their generation and four of them — Fermi, Rabi, Bethe, and Lamb — were to be awarded the Nobel Prize.

As an undergraduate, Ashkin was invited to join an honorary mathematics society, and received awards. He entered the fall semester as an assistant lecturer and began work toward a master's degree. A year later, having received that degree, he began work toward a Ph.D. under the supervision of Willis Lamb. As a graduate student, Ashkin contributed to one paper in astrophysics. and two papers in statistical mechanics He collaborated with Lamb in writing the first of the two papers on statistical mechanics and with Teller in writing the second. This second paper, "Statistics of Two-Dimensional Lattices with Four Components" has since been frequently cited. He received his Ph.D. in physics in 1943.

== Manhattan Project ==
=== Early stages of the Manhattan Project at Columbia University ===
During the latter part of 1942, before completing his Ph.D. work, Ashkin accepted an offer to work in the Manhattan Project. Early work on the development of the atom bomb had taken place at Columbia during the six years Ashkin was an undergraduate and graduate student there. When the process of nuclear fission was discovered in 1938, scientists in many locations in Europe and the United States began intense work to understand and control the phenomenon. Researchers at Columbia and nearby Princeton University were in the forefront of this work. There's no information on how much, if at all, Ashkin was involved in the effort at this early stage of his career, but it is certain that the Columbia physics department was the workplace for scientists who were devoted to the secret development of a new and phenomenally powerful weapon. These men included men already mentioned — Fermi, Rabi, Teller, and Bethe — as well as Leó Szilárd (who worked with Fermi to demonstrate that a nuclear reaction was possible), Herbert L. Anderson (then, like Ashkin, a Columbia graduate student), John R. Dunning (an associate professor at Columbia who had built a small cyclotron in the mid-1930s), Walter Zinn (a Columbia professor who worked with the Columbia cyclotron to demonstrate the possibility of a sustained chain reaction), George B. Pegram (Dean of Columbia's Faculties of Political Science, Philosophy, and Pure Science, who helped bring Fermi to the United States and brought him together with representatives of the U.S. Navy Department for the first discussion of the atomic bomb) and Harold Urey (associate professor of chemistry whose work on separation of isotopes resulted in the discovery of deuterium). In addition, Columbia received visits from scientists at Princeton University who were coordinating their work with Columbia colleagues. These included John Wheeler, Edward Creutz, and Robert R. Wilson.

=== Metallurgical Laboratory ===
When Ashkin accepted an invitation to join the Manhattan Project he was still working on his Ph.D. He spent the last few months of 1942 at the Metallurgical Laboratory at the University of Chicago and then worked at the Los Alamos Laboratory from mid-1943 to mid-1945. The scientists at the Metallurgical Laboratory, or Met Lab as it was called, used a nuclear reactor called the Chicago Pile to produce the world's first controlled chain reaction. They built the reactor in a disused squash court under the bleachers of Stagg Field, the university's old football stadium. They had been brought together from Columbia and Princeton by Arthur Compton who was a professor of physics at the University of Chicago. The Met Lab consisted of two divisions. Fermi, Anderson, Zinn, Creutz, and Szilard were key members of the physics division; Bethe and Teller of the theoretical division.

Although Ashkin's interest, experience, and skill would seem to place him with the theoretical division, he worked in the physics division in a group called "Nuclear Physics — Experimental." His placement in this group suggests that Ashkin had prior experience in carrying out nuclear experiments while a student at Columbia. With the other members of the group — Feld, Szilard, Robert F. Christy, Herbert E. Kubitschek, and Seymour Bernstein (untraced) — Ashkin produced a number of technical reports on the theoretical aspects of nuclear fission. With Feld, he also produced a practical report on Poisoning and Production in a Power Plant which considered the power potential of sustained nuclear reactions as well as the radiation poisoning and other hazards that accompanied them. All these reports were secret when produced and have since been declassified and released.

=== Los Alamos ===
At Los Alamos Ashkin was assigned to work in the Theoretical Division headed by Bethe. There were five groups in this division and Ashkin was assigned to group 4, Diffusion Problems. His responsibilities, broadly, permitted him to build upon work he had done as a graduate student and in his months at Met Lab. T-4's group leader was Richard Feynman; Ashkin was alternate leader. The initial members were Richard Ehrich, and Frederick Reines. Theodore Welton joined it in the early spring of 1944. The group's main task was to estimate the rate at which neutrons would diffuse through the explosive core of the bomb during nuclear fission. Somewhat facetiously Feynman later claimed that the work done at Los Alamos was mostly engineering, not science. Welton, however, told of the group's long hard hours, high spirits and cohesiveness, and said they achieved some excellent successes in theoretical physics. Their work required a great number of mathematical computations, which, Welton remembered, they performed using Work Projects Administration math tables and big Marchant mechanical calculators. In fact, their assistant, an enlisted man named Murray Peshkin, remembered the group as having an unending need for calculation. An undergraduate with a major in physics at the time he was recruited, he was put, as he recalled, "to solving differential equations that were needed to predict the critical mass of a bomb under various assumptions about the many unknown properties of the nuclei in the bomb material."

Security at Los Alamos was very tight by standards of the time. The site was an uninhabited desert location (formerly a private school) whose perimeter was fenced, with guards at the gates. The scientists were permitted outside the facility but there was little available transportation. (Since they were not members of the military, they could not be ordered to comply with military secrecy orders and instead voluntarily agreed to abide by them.) Although urban-raised scientists, like Ashkin, were far from the amusements that cities afford, they were able to find amusing things to do. It helped that some of the married ones were able to bring their wives to live in the town of Los Alamos and thus parties of men and women could get together for social activities. These include such things as hikes of hills and canyons of the surrounding wilderness areas. It's likely Ashkin played outdoor team sports while at Los Alamos. A Met Lab colleague remembered playing touch football with him and Feld on an open space called the midway at the University of Chicago.

Feynman was particularly adept at leavening hard work with light-hearted games. His genius was as much playful as serious. He took pride in deceiving the mail censors, guessing the combinations of safes in which secret files were stored, picking door locks, and teasing the guards (he would depart from the main gate, circle around the perimeter to a hole in the fence, re-enter the facility, and then exit the gate again, thus causing confusion and consternation both.) He also liked to pound his bongo drums, a practice which made those within hearing range grit their teeth but which he believed put him in touch with the spirits of the Indians who formerly inhabited the place. Feynman wasn't unusual in his affection for drumming but his choice of musical genres was atypical as was his lack of skill as a drummer. It appears that the music produced by his friends offended him as much as his relentless noise offended them. When Ashkin played the recorder, Feynman said he was using "an infernally popular wooden tube ... for making noises bearing a one-one correspondence to black dots on a piece of paper -- in imitation to music."

In 1946, before the scientists at Los Alamos dispersed, there was a brief period during which they gave lectures on subjects in which they had expertise. The program was styled the "Los Alamos University" and some junior members of laboratory personnel received college credit for attending them. Ashkin's were on theoretical mechanics. The course description says it covered the dynamics of particles, rigid bodies, elastic media, and fluids using vector analysis, particle dynamics, Lagrange's equations, and Hamilton's equations.

Along with other members of the Feynman team, Ashkin produced technical reports while at Los Alamos. These were classified at the time but have since been made public. One example gives an idea of the work carried out by the group. It is The Calculation of Critical Masses Including the Effects of the Distribution of Neutron Energies, by Feynman, R.P.; Welton, T.A.; Ashkin, J.; Ehrlich, R.; Peshkin, M.; and Reines, F. Report LA-524(Del.) January 21, 1947 (extract from abstract: "Convenient approximate methods are developed for the calculation of critical sizes and multiplication rates of spherical, active cores surrounded by infinite tampers. Special attention is given to those problems arising from the fact that neutrons of different velocities have different properties. The methods consist essentially of approximating the neutron densities at each velocity by fundamental mode shapes for each velocity.")

On July 16, 1945, Ashkin was present at the first-ever explosion of a nuclear bomb at the Trinity test site, Alamogordo. Only a few of the many scientists were permitted to witness this unspeakably dramatic culmination of their work. Ashkin was probably there because of his work on radiation poisoning, begun at Met Lab and probably continued afterward.

In 1950 it was revealed that one of the scientists at Los Alamos, Klaus Fuchs, was providing the Soviet intelligence bureau, NKGB, with secret information about bomb research. Between 1943 and 1946, Fuchs worked at both Columbia and Los Alamos. When the FBI interviewed Bethe and Feynman about their relationship with Fuchs while at Los Alamos, Feynman said Fuchs was quiet, reserved and not inclined to mix with other scientists outside of work. He also said he believed Fuchs was less stand-offish with Ashkin and seemed friendly with him.

== Academic positions ==
=== University of Rochester ===
On leaving Los Alamos in 1946 Ashkin obtained a position as assistant professor at the University of Rochester and in 1950 he moved to the Carnegie Institute of Technology (later Carnegie Mellon University). He remained at CMU for the rest of his life, serving as professor and for a period head of the physics department. Robert Marshak brought Ashkin to the University of Rochester in 1946. As an assistant professor he taught mechanics and thermodynamics and theoretical physics and performed pioneering experiments on neutron-proton, proton-proton, and nucleon-nucleon scattering.

While at Rochester, Ashkin was the first scientist to formally recognize the importance of the Feynman diagram. Feynman devised the diagram in 1948 to provide a simple visualization of the mathematical expressions governing the behavior of subatomic particles. Although the diagram and its offshoots were later seen as extremely important tools, Feynman did not give them a theoretical framework nor did he explain how he proposed they be used. Physicists had difficulty in understanding their function, distrusted their simplicity, and were reluctant to give them formal recognition. Feynman later said physicists did not realize the diagram's power and would employ a more complex method created by Julian Schwinger. Ashkin, he said, was the first to break with this pattern: "They somehow or other couldn’t do it. They had to go through this [the Schwinger method] to believe it. But that's all right. The only person who didn't, the first paper where it was used directly — which I kept looking for, I kept flipping through the Physical Review as it came out — was Ashkin. He'd done some calculation for some experiment, and he said, 'We’ve calculated this using Feynman's rules.' Bloop! There it was in writing! Then gradually more and more people did it."

While he was teaching at the University of Rochester, Ashkin married Claire Ruderman, a biologist studying at the same university. The couple had two daughters, Beth and Laura.

=== Carnegie Mellon University ===
In 1950 Ashkin joined the physics faculty of Carnegie Mellon University (then the Carnegie Institute of Technology) where Edward Creutz was department head and director of a new 450 MeV proton synchrocyclotron that CIT had built in nearby Saxonburg, Pennsylvania. Joining fellow scientists Lincoln Wolfenstein and Sergio de Benedetti, at this time Ashkin began to transition from mainly theoretical to mainly experimental work. The cyclotron remained in use at the Saxonburg Nuclear Research Center until the mid-1970s when it was dismantled and, using it, Ashkin was able to produce some of his best-known experimental results.

In 1953, with Bethe, his former director of theoretical work in Los Alamos, Ashkin published an article closely related to the work they had then done. This article, "Passage of Radiations Through Matter," summarized the effects of particles and radiation as they passed through solids. In time it became a standard reference for physics experimenters. Using the CIT cyclotron and following on work done by Bethe and Robert E. Marshak, Ashkin conducted experiments to determine the characteristics of a short-lived particle — the pi-meson or pion — that is produced when high energy cosmic ray protons and other cosmic ray components interact with matter in the Earth's atmosphere. Ashkin served as chair of the physics department between 1961 and 1972. After he died, CMU created the Julius Ashkin Teaching Award in his honor.

=== Sabbatical at CERN ===
In 1958–1959 Ashkin won a Ford Foundation grant to spend a sabbatical year in Geneva, Switzerland, at CERN, the European Organization for Nuclear Research. There, he became a member of the first group of scientists to use that institution's new 600 MeV synchrocyclotron. Using this particle accelerator he helped to make a significant discovery which confirmed an aspect of the V-A Theory of weak interactions. Supported by a grant from the Guggenheim Foundation, in 1968 he also spent a year as a Fellow at All Souls College, Oxford.

Ashkin died at Montefiore Hospital in Pittsburgh, Pennslylvania on June 4, 1982, after a lengthy illness.
