= Takaneh, Lorestan =

Village in Lorestan province, Iran

Takaneh Persian: تكانه
- Village
- Location within Iran
- Coordinates: 33°30′59″N 48°30′19″E
- Country: Iran
- Province: Lorestan
- County: Khorramabad
- District: Central
- Rural District: Dehpir-e Shomali

Population (2016)
  - Total: 310
- Time zone: UTC+3:30 (IRST)

Takaneh (Persian: تكانه) (Note: Also romanized as Takāneh) is a village in Dehpir-e Shomali Rural District of the Central District in Khorramabad County, Lorestan province, Iran.

== Demographics ==
=== Population ===
At the time of the 2006 National Census, the village's population was 314 in 66 households. The following census in 2011 counted 328 people in 97 households. The 2016 census measured the population of the village as 310 people in 89 households.
