= Tajareh, Saveh =

Tajareh تجره
- Village
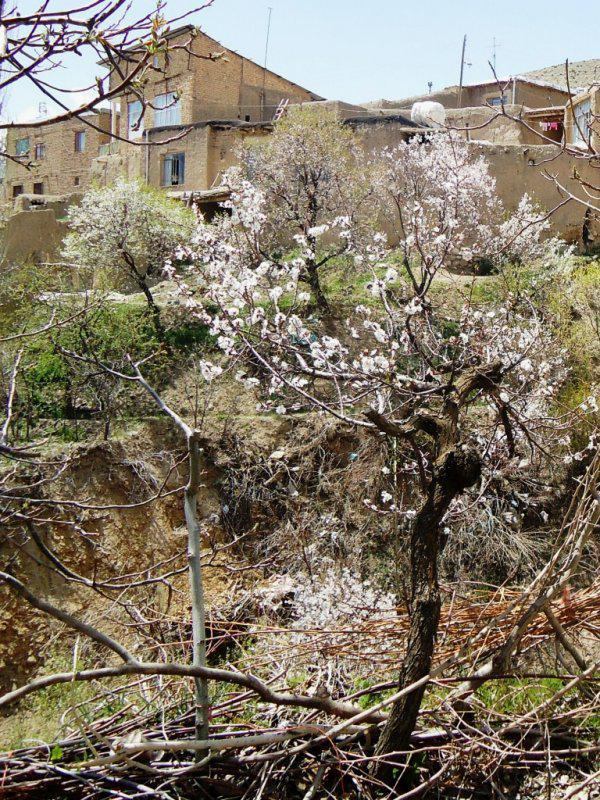
- Tajareh, Saveh

- Location within Iran
- Coordinates: 35°14′10″N 49°40′54″E
- Country: Iran
- Province: Markazi
- County: Saveh
- Bakhsh: Nowbaran
- Rural District: Bayat

Population (2006)
  - Total: 142
- Time zone: UTC+3:30 (IRST)
  - Summer (DST): UTC+4:30 (IRDT)

Tajareh (Persian: تجره; also known as Tajjra) is a village in Bayat Rural District, Nowbaran District, Saveh County, Markazi Province, Iran. At the 2006 census, its population was 142, in 47 families.
