= Askin, Iran =

Askin اسكين
- Village
- Location within Iran
- Coordinates: 35°16′17″N 49°45′32″E
- Country: Iran
- Province: Markazi
- County: Saveh
- Bakhsh: Nowbaran
- Rural District: Aq Kahriz

Population (2006)
  - Total: 30
- Time zone: UTC+3:30 (IRST)
  - Summer (DST): UTC+4:30 (IRDT)

Askin (Persian: اسكين, also Romanized as Āskīn and Askīn) is a village in Aq Kahriz Rural District, Nowbaran District, Saveh County, Markazi Province, Iran. At the 2006 census, its population was 30, in 7 families.
