= Michael Ashkin =

American artist

Michael Ashkin is an American artist who makes sculptures, videos, photographs and installations depicting marginalized, desolate landscapes. He is a professor at Cornell University College of Architecture, Art, and Planning. Ashkin was a 2009 Guggenheim Fellow.

Ashkin is best known for his use of miniature scale and modest materials. He had his first solo show in 1996, and his floor sculpture called No. 49, was included in the 1997 Whitney Biennial. His work has been featured at the Andrea Rosen Gallery in New York, the Renaissance Society in Chicago, Vienna Secession, and in Documenta11 in Germany.

Ashkin authored Garden State, a book which compares the New Jersey Meadowlands to a formal garden. In 2014, A-Jump Books published Ashkin's Long Branch a book of photographs and text documenting the destruction of a New Jersey neighborhood and in 2018 TIS Books published a book of photographs from Berlin entitled Horizont. Ashkin's were it not for was published in 2019 with FW:Books, and combines photographs of the Mojave desert with sentences that begin with the book's title. There will be two of you was published in 2024 by FW:Books

Ashkin was born in Morristown, New Jersey, the son of Arthur Ashkin, a Nobel Prize-winning physicist, and the nephew of the physicist Julius Ashkin. Before returning to art school, Ashkin taught Arabic and received an M.A. in Middle East Languages from Columbia University, and supported himself as a computer programmer.
