= Jules Eskin =

Jules Louis Eskin
- Born: October 20, 1931; Philadelphia, Pennsylvania
- Died: November 15, 2016 (aged 85) Brookline, Massachusetts
- Occupation: Principal cellist for the Boston Symphony Orchestra
- Instrument: Cello
- Spouse: Virginia Eskin (m. 1964)

Jules Louis Eskin (October 20, 1931 – November 15, 2016) was an American cellist who was the principal cellist of the Boston Symphony Orchestra. He was born in Philadelphia. With conductor Seiji Ozawa, he is known for solo performances of well-known works by Johannes Brahms, Gabriel Fauré, and Ludwig van Beethoven. Prior to joining the Boston Symphony Orchestra, he spent three years with the Cleveland Orchestra under George Szell. He also played for the Boston Chamber Players and Burton Quintet Five.

Eskin died at the age of 85 on November 15, 2016, in Brookline, Massachusetts from cancer.
