= Tajareh-ye Galehdar =

Village in Lorestan province, Iran

Tajareh-ye Galehdar Persian: تجره گله دار
- Village
- Location within Iran
- Coordinates: 33°29′54″N 48°29′24″E
- Country: Iran
- Province: Lorestan
- County: Khorramabad
- District: Central
- Rural District: Dehpir-e Shomali

Population (2016)
  - Total: 366
- Time zone: UTC+3:30 (IRST)

Tajareh-ye Galehdar (Persian: تجره گله دار) (Note: Also romanized as Tajareh-ye Galehdār, Tajareh-ye Gallehdār, and Tājereh Gallehdār) is a village in Dehpir-e Shomali Rural District of the Central District in Khorramabad County, Lorestan province, Iran.

== Demographics ==
=== Population ===
At the time of the 2006 National Census, the village's population was 345 in 74 households. The following census in 2011 counted 319 people in 84 households. The 2016 census measured the population of the village as 366 people in 109 households.
