= Barbara Askins =

American chemist (born 1939)

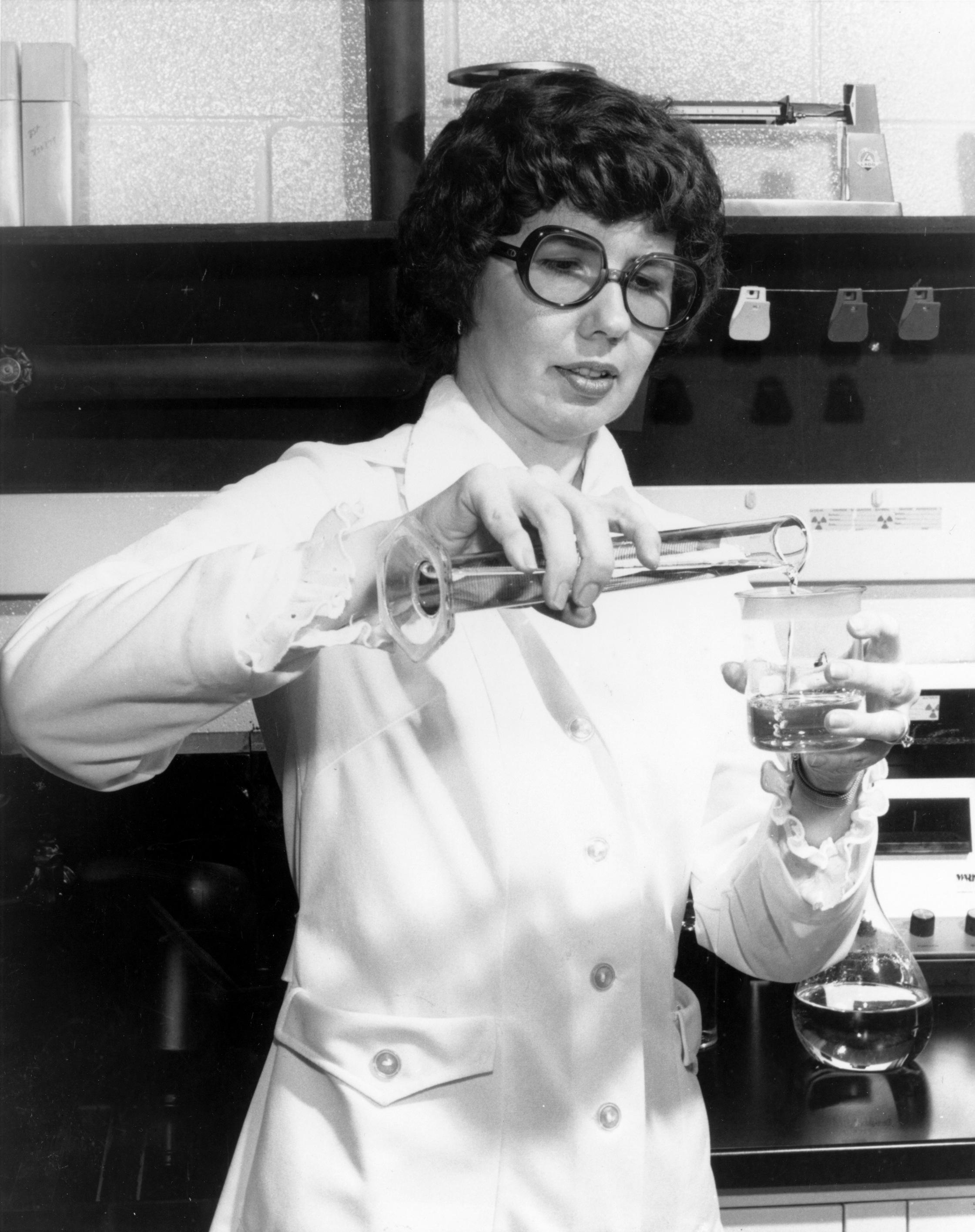
- Askins in 1977
- Born: 1939 (age 86–87); Belfast, Tennessee, U.S.
- Education: University of Alabama in Huntsville
- Awards: National Inventor of the Year
- Scientific career
- Fields: Chemistry
- Workplaces: Marshall Space Flight Center

Barbara S. Askins (born 1939) is an American chemist. She is best known for her invention of a method to enhance underexposed photographic negatives. This development was used extensively by NASA and the medical industry, and it earned Askins the title of National Inventor of the Year in 1978.

== Early years, education and early career ==
Askins was born in Belfast, Tennessee, in 1939. She began her career as a teacher. After her two children entered school, Askins returned to college to complete her bachelor's degree in chemistry and earn her master's degree in chemistry. She joined NASA's Marshall Space Flight Center in 1975.

== Research career ==
Askins is a physical chemist who worked for NASA's Marshall Space Flight Center and is best known for her pioneering invention of a process in which "images on developed photographic emulsions can be significantly intensified by making the image silver radioactive and exposing a second emulsion to this radiation." The resulting print, known as an autoradiograph, reproduces the image with significant increases in density and contrast. Her groundbreaking method enhanced underexposed emulsions and increased the limits of photographic detection. In short, it made visible the invisible in photos that would otherwise have been useless. This was very useful for a number of applications, including the coaxing of data from underexposed space images—such as those peering deep into space as well as those highlighting the geology of other bodies in the Solar System.

Askins' invention also led to significant advances in the field of medical technology. In particular, Askins' method prompted improvements in the development of X-ray images. Medical images that were 96 percent underexposed suddenly become readable; this meant that doctors could dramatically decrease the amount of X-ray radiation they gave to patients when running routine or emergency tests. Askins' process was also later used in the restoration of old photographs. Askins patented her invention in 1978 (U.S. patent No. 4,101,780), and NASA employed it extensively for its research and development work.

== Awards and professional memberships ==
In 1978, the Association for Advancement of Inventions and Innovations named Askins the National Inventor of the Year. She was the first individual woman to earn this honor.

Askins is a member of the American Chemical Society, the Sigma Xi honorary research Society, the American Association for the Advancement of Science, and the World Future Society.
