= Robert Askins =

American murderer, rapist, and suspected serial killer (1919–2010)

- Askins in a police lineup
- Born: Robert Elwood Askins; January 7, 1919; Washington, D.C., U.S.
- Died: April 30, 2010 (aged 91); FCI Cumberland, Cumberland, Maryland, U.S.
- Convictions: Murder, kidnapping, rape, sodomy, assault with a dangerous weapon
- Penalty: Life imprisonment

Details
- Victims: 1–3+
- Span of crimes: 1938–1977
- Country: United States
- State: District of Columbia
- Date apprehended: For the final time in March 1977

Robert Elwood Askins (January 7, 1919 – April 30, 2010) was an American murderer, sex offender, and suspected serial killer from Washington, D.C. who was convicted of fatally poisoning Ruth McDonald in 1938 and was a prime suspect in two other murders committed decades apart. He was also a suspect in the Freeway Phantom murders in the early 1970s, in which at least five girls and one woman were abducted and killed in the area.

== Murders ==
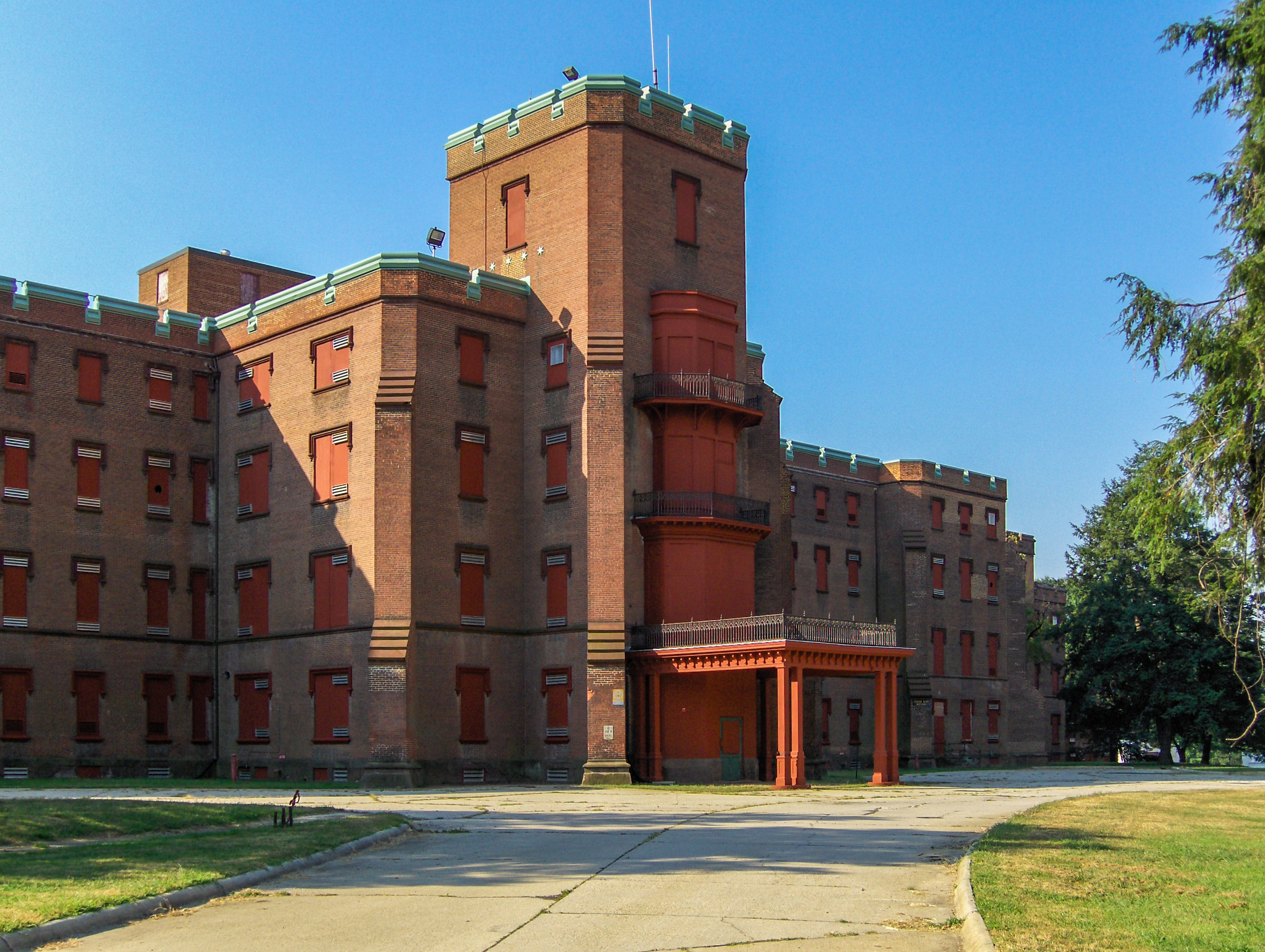
St. Elizabeths Hospital, where Askins was a patient between 1939 and 1951

In 1938, 19-year-old Askins was a member of the science club at Miner Teachers College. On December 28, he served cyanide-laced whiskey to five sex workers at a brothel in Washington, D.C., and offered a $1 reward to whoever could swallow it the fastest. 31-year-old Ruth McDonald drank all of it and was found dead by paramedics.

Two days later, he stabbed a 26-year-old sex worker named Elizabeth Johnson to death at the same brothel. He was arrested, and during questioning, he told police that he had contracted a disease from a sex worker and would "kill them all at one time if he could". He was sent to Gallinger Hospital for evaluation. There, he assaulted three orderlies with a chair. During his murder trial, it was revealed that he was a police informant, aiding law enforcement in the arrests of sex workers. In April 1939, he was committed to St. Elizabeths Hospital after being declared criminally insane.

Askins was released in 1951, and in April of the following year, he strangled 42-year-old Laura Cook to death. He was indicted in 1954 and accused of several other similar assaults. He was also retried for the 1938 murder after it was determined that he was legally sane. He claimed that the original purpose of the cyanide used in the murder of Ruth McDonald was for his own suicide, but the jury returned its verdict of guilty, and he was sentenced to 15 years to life for second degree murder. His conviction was later overturned in 1958 on a technicality concerning the statute of limitations.

== Later crimes and imprisonment ==
In March 1977, 58-year-old Askins, then a computer technician at the National Science Foundation, was charged with abducting and raping a 24-year-old woman inside his home. Detectives interrogated Askins and learned of his previous murder charges. In 1978, Askins' rowhouse was searched in connection with the Freeway Phantom murders, in which several young girls were abducted, raped, and killed between 1970 and 1972 in Washington, D.C. Investigators found in his possession a knife used in another crime, photographs of girls and young women, women's scarves, and an essay written by a young girl. Police discovered one suspicious piece of evidence in his desk drawer—court documents in which a judge had used the word "tantamount", an atypical word that Freeway Phantom victim Brenda Woodard was forced to use in a written note that was left in her pocket. Askins was also reported to have used the word frequently in work matters.

A search warrant was obtained, and investigators dug through Askins' backyard, which turned up nothing. A month later, they received another warrant to search his vehicle, where they found two gold buttons and an earring. No solid evidence was found to connect Askins to the murders, and no charges were filed.

Askins remained in prison for the rest of his life for the two abductions and rapes he committed in the mid-1970s. He denied having any connection to the Freeway Phantom murders to detectives and the press when questioned, claiming that he did not have the "depravity of mind required to commit any of the crimes". He died at the Federal Correctional Institution, Cumberland, on April 30, 2010, aged 91.

== See also ==
- List of serial killers in the United States
