= Tajareh Sar Ab-e Sadat =

Village in Lorestan province, Iran

Tajareh Sar Ab-e Sadat Persian: تجره سراب سادات
- Village
- Location within Iran
- Coordinates: 33°30′46″N 48°28′01″E
- Country: Iran
- Province: Lorestan
- County: Khorramabad
- District: Central
- Rural District: Dehpir-e Shomali

Population (2016)
  - Total: 321
- Time zone: UTC+3:30 (IRST)

Tajareh Sar Ab-e Sadat (Persian: تجره سراب سادات) (Note: Also romanized as Tajareh Sar Āb-e Sādāt; also known as Tajreh-ye Sarāb) is a village in, and the capital of, Dehpir-e Shomali Rural District in the Central District of Khorramabad County, Lorestan province, Iran.

== Demographics ==
=== Population ===
At the time of the 2006 National Census, the village's population was 279 in 63 households. The following census in 2011 counted 341 people in 87 households. The 2016 census measured the population of the village as 321 people in 89 households.
