= David Crabiel =

American politician

David Bruce Crabiel (June 19, 1930 – December 1, 2008) was an American Democratic Party politician who served as countywide elected official in Middlesex County, New Jersey for 27 years. He was the youngest brother of J. Edward Crabiel, a former New Jersey Senate Minority Leader and New Jersey Secretary of State.

== Family ==
Crabiel's father was Joseph M. Crabiel, who was a Pennsylvania Railroad official and was a member of the Milltown Board of Education and Borough Council. His family settled in Milltown in 1852 and his brother, parents, and grandfather also held in community offices. He was married to Jean Evelyn Rasmussen and later to Mary Varga and had five children.

== Early life ==
He was drafted in 1951, and was stationed in Alaska with the Army Medical Corps during the Korean War. He was discharged with the rank of Corporal in October 1953. In a 1999 commencement address at Middlesex County College, Crabiel noted that he flunked out of Rutgers. In the late 1950s, Crabiel worked part time as a county morgue keeper at Raritan Bar Medical Center. He was an undertaker and owned The Crabiel Home for Funerals in Milltown. Crabiel founded the Crabiel Home for Funerals in 1956. He expanded to Rahway in 1960 and Westfield-Cranford in 1966. Crabiel Inc operated six funeral homes in Central New Jersey at the time of Crabiel's death in 2008.

== Political career ==
Crabiel was elected to the Milltown Borough Council in 1960, and was re-elected in 1963 and 1966. He was elected mayor in 1967 and was re-elected in 1970, 1973, and 1976.

In 1974, Crabiel challenged ten-term Congressman Frank B. Thompson, Jr. in the 4th district Democratic primary. He lost 11,317 (65%) to 6,063 (35%).

He was appointed to fill a vacancy on the Middlesex County Board of Freeholders in 1978. He was elected in 1979, and re-elected in 1982, 1985, and 1988.

In 1986, Crabiel was the Democratic nominee for the U.S. House of Representatives in the 12th district. The race was designated as "targeted" by the Democratic Congressional Campaign Committee. He lost to four-term Republican incumbent Jim Courter, 72,966 (63.5%) to 41,967 (36.4%).

Crabiel was defeated for re-election to a sixth term as Freeholder in the Republican landslide of 1991. He was again elected in 1994, and re-elected in 1997, 2000, 2003 and 2006. He died in office, after winning his biggest election victory in November, 2008. Crabiel's death was unexpected, and he was replaced as freeholder director by Stephen J. Dalina.

== Community service and legacy ==
Crabiel was a member of a number of boards and civic organizations. He was elected to the board of directors of the North Brunswick Savings & Loan Association in 1972. Other memberships included honorary chairman of the Melvin H. Motolinsky Research Foundation, honorary co-chair of the Middlesex County Human Relations Commission, member of the board of directors of the Cerebral Palsy Association, Lions and Keep Middlesex Moving Inc, North Jersey Transportation Planning Commission Inc, and on the advisory board of the Raritan Valley Workshop. He received the Charles A. Lindbergh Transportation Award granted by the State of New Jersey and was honored by the State of Israel and State of Israel Bonds. The David B. Crabiel Scholarship Foundation was established in 1992 for students in Middlesex County. In 2014, the scholarship dedicated the David B. Crabiel Fireplace at Robert Wood Johnson University Hospital in honor of donations to the hospital by the foundation. In 2009, Middlesex County College began construction on David B. Crabiel Hall in Crabiel's name.
