= Darreh Saki, Khorramabad =

Darreh Saki دره ساكي
- Village
- Location within Iran
- Coordinates: 33°34′35″N 48°36′03″E
- Country: Iran
- Province: Lorestan
- County: Khorramabad
- Bakhsh: Bayravand
- Rural District: Beyranvand-e Jonubi

Population (2006)
  - Total: 70
- Time zone: UTC+3:30 (IRST)
  - Summer (DST): UTC+4:30 (IRDT)

Darreh Saki (Persian: دره ساكي, also Romanized as Darreh Sākī, Darreh Sākhi, and Darreh-ye Sākī) is a village in Beyranvand-e Jonubi Rural District, Bayravand District, Khorramabad County, Lorestan Province, Iran. At the 2006 census, its population was 70, consisting of 18 families.
