= Eskin-e Bala =

Village in Lorestan province, Iran

Eskin-e Bala Persian: اسکين بالا
- Village
- Location within Iran
- Coordinates: 33°34′13″N 48°25′48″E
- Country: Iran
- Province: Lorestan
- County: Khorramabad
- District: Central
- Rural District: Dehpir-e Shomali

Population (2016)
  - Total: 369
- Time zone: UTC+3:30 (IRST)

Eskin-e Bala (Persian: اسکين بالا) (Note: Also romanized as Eskīn-e Bālā; formerly known as Eskin-e Olya (اسكين عليا), also romanized as Eskīn-e ‘Olyā) is a village in Dehpir-e Shomali Rural District of the Central District in Khorramabad County, Lorestan province, Iran.

== Demographics ==
=== Population ===
At the time of the 2006 National Census, the village's population, as Eskin-e Olya, was 429 in 93 households. The following census in 2011 counted 401 people in 101 households, by which time the village was listed as Eskin-e Bala. The 2016 census measured the population of the village as 369 people in 100 households.
