= Eskin-e Pain =

Village in Lorestan province, Iran

Eskin-e Pain Persian: اسکين پايين
- Village
- Location within Iran
- Coordinates: 33°34′15″N 48°25′19″E
- Country: Iran
- Province: Lorestan
- County: Khorramabad
- District: Central
- Rural District: Dehpir-e Shomali

Population (2016)
  - Total: 35
- Time zone: UTC+3:30 (IRST)

Eskin-e Pain (Persian: اسکين پايين) (Note: Also romanized as Eskīn-e Pā’īn; formerly known as Eskin-e Sofla (اسكين سفلي), also romanized as Eskīn-e Soflá; also known as Askīn and Eskīn) is a village in Dehpir-e Shomali Rural District of the Central District in Khorramabad County, Lorestan province, Iran.

== Demographics ==
=== Population ===
At the time of the 2006 National Census, the village's population, as Eskin-e Sofla, was 54 in 15 households. The following census in 2011 counted 51 people in 14 households, by which time the village was listed as Eskin-e Pain. The 2016 census measured the population of the village as 35 people in 10 households.
