= Virginia Eskin =

American pianist (born 1940)

- Born: Virginia Rubottom; November 13, 1940 (age 85); New York City, New York, United States
- Instrument: Piano
- Label: Northeastern Records
- Formerly of: Boston Symphony Orchestra
- Spouse: Jules Eskin (m. 1967)
- Website: virginiaeskin.com

Virginia Eskin (née Rubottom, born November 13, 1940) is an American pianist, writer and record label founder. She is most known for performing the works of female composers, particularly Amy Beach.

== Biography ==
Virginia Rubottom was born on November 13, 1940, in New York City, United States. She studied piano in Los Angeles, California, with Aube Tzerko; in London, England, with Gina Bachauer, Myra Hess and Ilona Kabos; then in Boston, Massachusetts, with Leonard Shure.

Eskin married cellist Jules Eskin in 1967 and they moved to South End, Boston, Massachusetts, when he joined the Boston Symphony Orchestra (BSO) in 1964. Eskin signed to Columbia Artists in 1977 and moved to New Hampshire in the 1980s.

Eskin founded Northeastern Records. Her recordings include performances of works by female American and European composers including Mary Jeanne van Appledorn, Grażyna Bacewicz, Marion Bauer, Amy Beach, Cécile Chaminade, Rebecca Clarke, Vítezslava Kaprálová, Fanny Mendelssohn, Florence Price, Ruth Crawford Seeger, Adaline Shepherd, Maria Szymanowska, Louise Talma and Germaine Tailleferre. She has also recorded works by two Jewish musicians who were incarcerated in the Theresienstadt Ghetto by the Nazis in World War II, Gideon Klein and Viktor Ulmann, with the Hawthorne Quartet.

Eskin has given lectures at colleges and universities in America, including the New England Conservatory of Music, Boston University, Brandeis University, Harvard University and Northeastern University. She has studied and given talks on Black American composers, such as Margaret Bonds, Zenobia Powell Perry, Florence Price and Mary Lou Williams.

Eskin has contributed articles to The Boston Musical Intelligencer and has performed on radio programs. She was the co-producer, with John Gfoerer, of the teleivision documentary Composer: Amy Beach, which was broadcast on PBS.

Eskin was honored by a Lifetime Achievement Award from the Lotus Club of New York.
