= Frank Askin =

American jurist and law professor (1932–2021)

Frank Askin (January 8, 1932 - July 1, 2021) was an American jurist and professor of law at Rutgers School of Law - Newark.

== Career ==
He was appointed to the Rutgers faculty upon his graduation from that school with highest honors in 1966. Admitted to the law school without an undergraduate degree, he was awarded a B.A. from City College of New York at the same time he received his J.D. from Rutgers.

In 1970, he established the Constitutional Litigation Clinic as part of the law school's curriculum. Under his guidance, the clinic litigated the first police surveillance cases in the nation; battled the FBI over the investigation and maintenance of files on two precocious New Jersey high schoolers who corresponded with "the wrong persons"; defended affirmative action programs up to the United States Supreme Court; challenged the New Jersey State Police for stopping and searching "long-haired travelers" on the state's highways; argued for the right of the homeless to vote and to have access to public library facilities; and protected the right of grassroots advocacy groups to take their messages door-to-door and to privately owned shopping malls. He still is associated with the clinic. Professor Askin has been a member of the National Board of the American Civil Liberties Union since 1969 and has been one of the ACLU's four general counsels since 1976. In 1986, he was the (unsuccessful) Democratic candidate for Congress in New Jersey's 11th District, covering parts of Essex and Morris Counties.

His memoir, Defending Rights: A Life in Law and Politics, was published in 1997. He is listed in Woodward & White's Best Lawyers in America.
