= Dehpir-e Shomali Rural District =

Rural district in Lorestan province, Iran

Dehpir-e Shomali Rural District Persian: دهستان ده پير شمالي
- Rural District
- Location within Iran
- Coordinates: 33°33′N 48°27′E
- Country: Iran
- Province: Lorestan
- County: Khorramabad
- District: Central
- Established: 1990
- Capital: Tajareh Sar Ab-e Sadat

Population (2016)
  - Total: 6,082
- Time zone: UTC+3:30 (IRST)

Dehpir-e Shomali Rural District (Persian: دهستان ده پير شمالي) is in the Central District of Khorramabad County, Lorestan province, Iran. Its capital is the village of Tajareh Sar Ab-e Sadat.

== Demographics ==
=== Population ===
At the time of the 2006 National Census, the rural district's population was 6,332 in 1,377 households. There were 6,108 inhabitants in 1,610 households at the following census of 2011. The 2016 census measured the population of the rural district as 6,082 in 1,733 households. The most populous of its 33 villages was Garab, with 599 people.

=== Other villages in the rural district ===
- Eskin-e Bala
- Eskin-e Pain
- Hulandasht
- Khan Jan Khani
- Mirabad
- Tajareh-ye Galehdar
- Takaneh
