= Ronald Reagan presidential campaign =

Ronald Reagan, the 40th president of the United States, ran for president four times:

- Ronald Reagan 1968 presidential campaign, an unsuccessful primary campaign for the Republican nomination
- Ronald Reagan 1976 presidential campaign, an unsuccessful primary campaign for the Republican nomination
- Ronald Reagan 1980 presidential campaign, a successful election campaign resulting in him being elected the 40th president of the United States
- Ronald Reagan 1984 presidential campaign, a successful re-election campaign
