= 2014 United States Senate election in New Jersey =

- November 4, 2014
- Turnout: 36% (▲11.5pp)
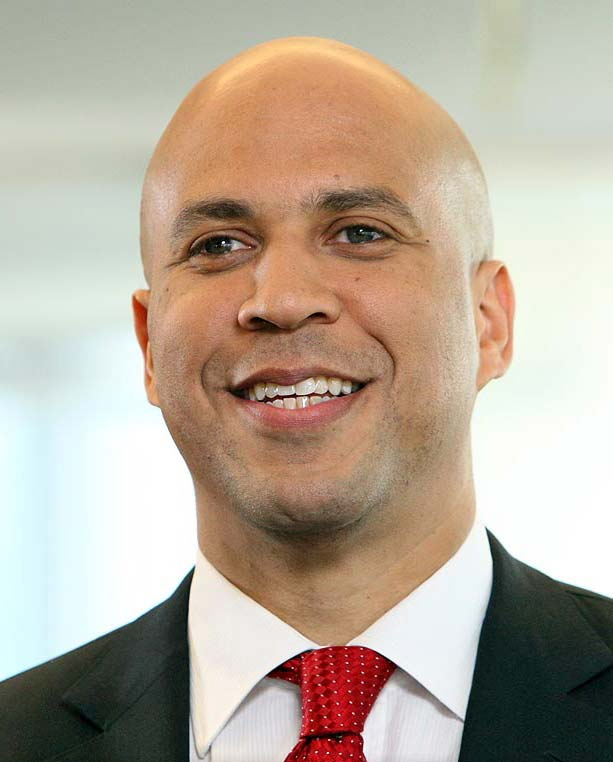

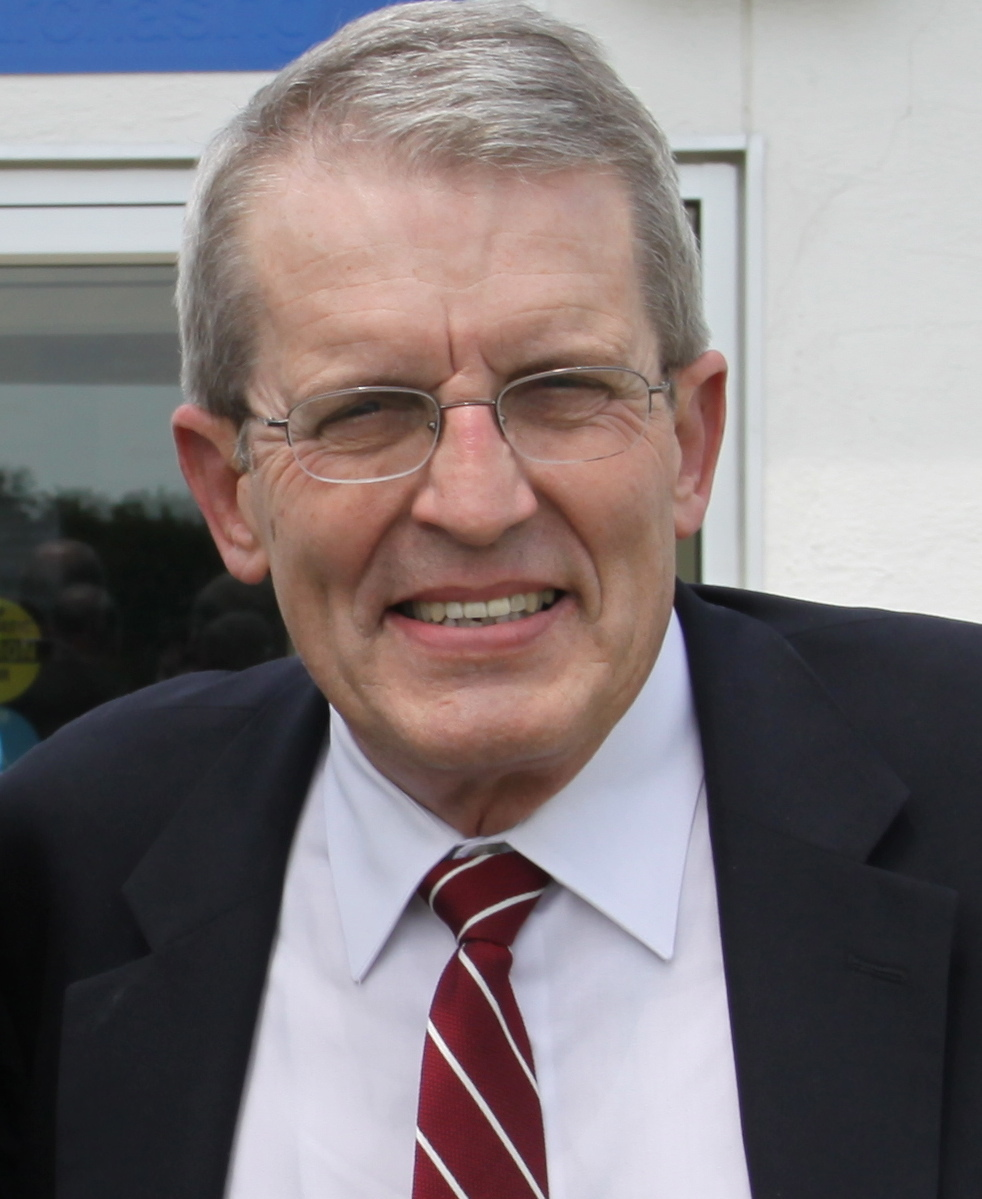
Nominee	Cory Booker	Jeff Bell
Party	Democratic	Republican
Popular vote	1,043,866	791,297
Percentage	55.84%	42.33%
- Booker: 40–50% 50–60% 60–70% 70–80% 80–90% >90% Bell: 40–50% 50–60% 60–70% 70–80% 80–90%
U.S. senator before election
Cory Booker
Democratic
Elected U.S. Senator
Cory Booker
Democratic

The 2014 United States Senate election in New Jersey was held on November 4, 2014, to elect a member of the United States Senate to represent the State of New Jersey. Incumbent Senator Cory Booker was first elected in a 2013 special election to complete the term of fellow Democrat Frank Lautenberg, who died in office. Booker defeated Jeff Bell to win a first full term.

== Democratic primary ==
=== Candidates ===
==== Declared ====
- Cory Booker, incumbent U.S. Senator

==== Withdrew ====
- Antonio Sabas, candidate for the U.S. Senate in 2013 (ran as an independent)

==== Declined ====
- Rob Andrews, U.S. Representative and candidate for the U.S. Senate in 2008
- Robert M. Gordon, state senator
- Patrick J. Kennedy, former U.S. Representative from Rhode Island
- Beth Mason, Hoboken City Councilwoman
- Bill Pascrell, U.S. Representative
- Ronald Rice, state senator
- Stephen M. Sweeney, president of the New Jersey Senate

=== Polling ===
Hypothetical polling

Poll source	Date(s) administered	Sample size	Margin of error	Rob Andrews	Cory Booker	Rush D. Holt Jr.	Frank Pallone	Stephen Sweeney	Other	Undecided
Public Policy Polling	November 26–28, 2012	300	± 5.6%	17%	48%	—	13%	—	11%	11%
Merriman-River	January 7–9, 2013	1,170	± 2.9%	10%	48%	—	8%	6%	—	28%
Fairleigh Dickinson	March 4–10, 2013	323	± 5.5%	—	50%	7%	4%	—	6%	32%

Poll source	Date(s) administered	Sample size	Margin of error	Cory Booker	Frank Lautenberg	Other	Undecided
Public Policy Polling	November 26–28, 2012	300	± 5.6%	59%	22%	—	18%
Fairleigh Dickinson	January 2–6, 2013	700	± 3.7%	42%	20%	17%	21%
Merriman-River	January 7–9, 2013	1,170	± 2.9%	48%	21%	—	31%
Quinnipiac	January 15–21, 2013	616	± 4%	51%	30%	1%	18%

Poll source	Date(s) administered	Sample size	Margin of error	Cory Booker	Frank Lautenberg	Frank Pallone	Alan Rosenthal	Stephen Sweeney	Other	Undecided
Monmouth	February 6–10, 2013		± 7.1%	40%	25%	4%	2%	2%	5%	22%

=== Results ===
Democratic primary results
Party	Candidate	Votes	%
Democratic	Cory Booker (incumbent)	197,158	100.00%
Total votes		197,158	100.00%

== Republican primary ==
2013 nominee Steve Lonegan announced in his concession speech that he would not run again for the seat in the 2014 race. The top-tier candidates for the Republican primary, Thomas Kean Jr. and Jay Webber also declined to run in early January 2014, leaving Jon Bramnick and Michael J. Doherty as the remaining candidates with established credentials and fundraising abilities able to start a United States Senate campaign. On January 9, 2014, Brian D. Goldberg, a West Orange resident and New Jersey businessman, announced that he would seek the Republican nomination. The following week, on January 17, 2014, both Bramnick and Doherty announced that they would not be running for United States Senate.

On January 27, 2014, Freehold Township businessman Richard J. "Rich" Pezzullo announced his candidacy for the Republican nomination. Pezzullo had previously run for the US Senate in 1996 as the Conservative Party candidate. On February 4, 2014, conservative political consultant Jeff Bell announced his bid for the nomination. Bell was the nominee for the Senate in 1978, having defeated incumbent senator Clifford Case in the Republican primary and was an unsuccessful candidate for the Republican nomination in 1982. Ramapo College professor Murray Sabrin, who ran for the Senate in 2000 and 2008, announced another run on February 13. Former FBI agent Robert Turkavage, who ran as an Independent candidate for the U.S. Senate in 2012, had declared his candidacy. However, he got stuck in a traffic jam when he attempted to turn in his petitions shortly before the deadline, and was forced to withdraw.

On March 4, Richard Pezzullo won the Union County Convention on the first ballot, going on to then win the line in Camden County and Republican stronghold Monmouth County. Opponent Brian Goldberg won the party lines in conventions in Ocean, Atlantic, Cumberland, Mercer, and Somerset Counties. Murray Sabrin won only the Middlesex line, and Jeffrey Bell made no convention appearances and contested no lines. Three candidates – Brian Goldberg, Richard Pezzullo and Murray Sabrin – claimed the Burlington county line, though only Goldberg claimed to have won the line. Goldberg was given the county line with no convention in Essex, Passaic, and Hudson Counties. Robert Turkavage won the convention in Hunterdon County, but the line transferred to Goldberg after Turkavage dropped out of the race.

Jeff Bell received significant support from the conservative American Principles Fund, who ran a direct mail operation that cost over $80,000, and the National Organization for Marriage, a conservative traditional marriage group, who paid for $6,000 of automated calling.

=== Candidates ===
==== Declared ====
- Jeff Bell, political consultant, nominee for this seat in 1978 and candidate for the U.S. Senate in 1982
- Brian D. Goldberg, businessman
- Richard J. "Rich" Pezzullo, businessman and perennial candidate
- Murray Sabrin, professor at Ramapo College and perennial candidate

==== Withdrew ====
- Robert Turkavage, former FBI agent and Independent candidate for the U.S. Senate in 2012

==== Declined ====
- Jeffrey Chiesa, former U.S. senator
- Jack Ciattarelli, state assemblyman
- Roger Daley, former Middlesex County Freeholder, former judge on the New Jersey Superior Court and candidate for Middlesex County Freeholder in 2013
- Alieta Eck, former president of the Association of American Physicians and Surgeons, founder of the Zarephath Health Center and candidate for the U.S. Senate in 2013
- Scott Garrett, U.S. Representative
- Jon Hanson, former chairman of the New Jersey Sports and Exposition Authority
- Chris Isola, former Marine
- Thomas Kean Jr., Minority Leader of the New Jersey Senate and nominee for U.S. Senate in 2006
- Joe Kyrillos, state senator and nominee for the U.S. Senate in 2012
- Susanne LaFrankie, former television news reporter
- Frank LoBiondo, U.S. Representative
- Steve Lonegan, state director of Americans for Prosperity, former mayor of Bogota, candidate for governor in 2005 and 2009 and nominee for the U.S. Senate in 2013
- Bill Palatucci, attorney and member of the Republican National Committee
- Joe J. Plumeri, businessman
- Geraldo Rivera, talk show host
- David Samson, chairman of the Port Authority of New York and New Jersey and former New Jersey Attorney General
- Jay Webber, state assemblyman

=== Results ===
Republican primary results
Party	Candidate	Votes	%
Republican	Jeff Bell	42,728	29.41%
Republican	Richard J. Pezzullo	38,130	26.24%
Republican	Brian D. Goldberg	36,266	24.96%
Republican	Murray Sabrin	28,183	19.40%
Total votes		145,307	100.00%

County	Bell		Pezzullo		Goldberg		Sabrin		Total Votes
County	Total	%	Total	%	Total	%	Total	%	Total Votes
Atlantic	1,115	17.85%	744	11.91%	4,030	64.50%	359	5.75%	6,248
Bergen	4,833	56.63%	1,501	17.59%	953	11.17%	1,248	14.62%	8,535
Burlington	4,208	39.12%	3,220	24.58%	1,577	12.04%	4,097	31.27%	13,102
Camden	2,121	36.05%	2,566	43.62%	299	5.08%	897	15.25%	5,883
Cape May	2,011	60.70%	740	22.34%	245	7.40%	317	9.57%	3,313
Cumberland	436	23.34%	301	16.11%	1,038	55.58%	93	4.98%	1,868
Essex	904	20.45%	1,035	23.42%	2,161	48.89%	320	7.24%	4,420
Gloucester	1,213	29.43%	1,280	31.06%	714	17.33%	914	22.18%	4,121
Hudson	642	21.89%	285	9.70%	1,225	41.71%	785	26.73%	2,937
Hunterdon	2,426	28.29%	2,604	30.37%	2,118	24.70%	1,426	16.63%	8,574
Mercer	927	26.16%	377	10.64%	1,331	37.56%	909	25.65%	3,544
Middlesex	1,738	26.31%	1,338	20.25%	1,531	23.18%	1,999	30.26%	6,606
Monmouth	2,096	19.26%	5,999	55.11%	497	4.57%	2,293	21.07%	10,885
Morris	5,206	37.09%	3,197	22.77%	1,280	9.12%	4,355	31.02%	14,038
Ocean	3,389	17.51%	3,570	18.45%	10,840	56.02%	1,552	8.02%	19,351
Passaic	1,194	20.64%	1,015	17.55%	2,414	41.74%	1,161	20.07%	5,784
Salem	332	25.50%	389	29.88%	78	5.99%	503	38.63%	1,302
Somerset	3,399	36.35%	1,577	16.86%	3,122	33.39%	1,253	13.40%	9,351
Sussex	1,465	26.68%	2,451	44.64%	292	5.32%	1,282	23.35%	5,490
Union	1,162	19.37%	3,117	51.96%	283	4.72%	1,437	23.95%	5,999
Warren	1,871	48.15%	794	20.43%	238	6.12%	983	25.30%	3,886

== General election ==
=== Debates ===
- Complete video of debate, October 24, 2014

=== Fundraising ===
Candidate (party)	Receipts	Disbursements	Cash on hand	Debt
Cory Booker (D)	$16,534,557	$14,742,187	$2,583,176	$5,266
Jeff Bell (R)	$373,577	$282,459	$91,116	$11,788

=== Endorsements ===
Cory Booker

Organizations

- NARAL Pro-Choice America PAC
- New Jersey Education Association PAC
- New Jersey State AFL-CIO
Jeff Bell

Current & former elected officials

- Chris Christie, Governor of New Jersey
- Thomas Kean, former Governor of New Jersey (1982–1990) and Chairman of the 9/11 Commission

Media

- The New York Sun

Organizations

- American Conservative Union PAC

=== Predictions ===
Source	Ranking	As of
The Cook Political Report	Solid D	November 3, 2014
Sabato's Crystal Ball	Safe D	November 3, 2014
Rothenberg Political Report	Safe D	November 3, 2014
Real Clear Politics	Likely D	November 3, 2014

=== Polling ===
Poll source	Date(s) administered	Sample size	Margin of error	Cory Booker (D)	Jeff Bell (R)	Other	Undecided
Rasmussen Reports	June 17–18, 2014	750	± 4%	48%	35%	4%	13%
Monmouth University	June 25–29, 2014	717	± 3.7%	43%	23%	15%	17%
CBS News/NYT/YouGov	July 5–24, 2014	2,645	± 3.4%	50%	43%	1%	6%
Quinnipiac University	July 31 – August 4, 2014	1,148	± 2.9%	47%	37%	1%	16%
CBS News/NYT/YouGov	August 18 – September 2, 2014	2,244	± 3%	52%	37%	2%	10%
Fairleigh Dickinson University	September 1–7, 2014	721	± 3.7%	42%	29%	1%	27%
Richard Stockton College	September 5–8, 2014	807	± 3.5%	49%	36%	3%	12%
Quinnipiac University	September 25–29, 2014	1,058	± 3%	51%	40%	1%	8%
CBS News/NYT/YouGov	September 20 – October 1, 2014	2,011	± 3%	51%	37%	0%	12%
Monmouth University	October 2–5, 2014	477	± 4.5%	53%	38%	2%	7%
Fairleigh Dickinson University	October 13–19, 2014	525	± 4.3%	56%	40%	1%	3%
Richard Stockton College	October 18–22, 2014	806	± 3.5%	57%	33%	5%	5%
CBS News/NYT/YouGov	October 16–23, 2014	1,868	± 4%	51%	39%	0%	9%
Monmouth University	October 30 – November 2, 2014	750	± 3.6%	54%	40%	1%	5%

Hypothetical polling

With Andrews

Poll source	Date(s) administered	Sample size	Margin of error	Rob Andrews (D)	Kim Guadagno (R)	Other	Undecided
Public Policy Polling	November 26–28, 2012	600	± 4%	35%	34%	—	31%

With Booker

Poll source	Date(s) administered	Sample size	Margin of error	Cory Booker (D)	Kim Guadagno (R)	Other	Undecided
Public Policy Polling	November 26–28, 2012	600	± 4%	42%	39%	—	19%

Poll source	Date(s) administered	Sample size	Margin of error	Cory Booker (D)	Geraldo Rivera (R)	Other	Undecided
Quinnipiac University	February 13–17, 2013	1,149	± 2.9%	59%	23%	2%	17%
Fairleigh Dickinson University	March 4–10, 2013	702	± 3.7%	52%	21%	—	26%

Poll source	Date(s) administered	Sample size	Margin of error	Cory Booker (D)	Murray Sabrin (R)	Other	Undecided
Monmouth University	February 19–23, 2014	690	± 3.7%	58%	25%	1%	15%

With Bradley

Poll source	Date(s) administered	Sample size	Margin of error	Bill Bradley (D)	Jeff Bell (R)	Other	Undecided
Fairleigh Dickinson University	October 13–19, 2014	525	± 4.3%	57%	36%	0%	7%

With Lautenberg

Poll source	Date(s) administered	Sample size	Margin of error	Frank Lautenberg (D)	Kim Guadagno (R)	Other	Undecided
Public Policy Polling	November 26–28, 2012	600	± 4%	48%	33%	—	19%

With Pallone

Poll source	Date(s) administered	Sample size	Margin of error	Frank Pallone (D)	Kim Guadagno (R)	Other	Undecided
Public Policy Polling	November 26–28, 2012	600	± 4%	22%	42%	—	36%

=== Results ===
United States Senate election in New Jersey, 2014
Party	Candidate	Votes	%	±%
Democratic	Cory Booker (incumbent)	1,043,866	55.84%	+0.92%
Republican	Jeff Bell	791,297	42.33%	−1.69%
Libertarian	Joseph Baratelli	16,721	0.89%	N/A
Independent	Hank Schroeder	5,704	0.31%	N/A
Independent	Jeff Boss	4,513	0.24%	N/A
Independent	Eugene Martin Lavergne	3,890	0.21%	+0.13%
Independent	Antonio N. Sabas	3,544	0.19%	+0.09%
Total votes		1,869,535	100.00%	N/A
Democratic hold				

==== By county ====
County	Cory Booker Democratic		Jeff Bell Republican		Various candidates Other parties		Margin		Total votes cast
County	#	%	#	%	#	%	#	%	Total votes cast
Atlantic	32,566	51.44%	29,422	46.48%	1,319	2.08%	3,144	4.96%	62,494
Bergen	124,409	57.28%	89,597	41.25%	3,204	1.48%	34,812	16.03%	217,210
Burlington	64,730	54.30%	52,721	44.23%	1,755	1.47%	12,009	10.07%	119,206
Camden	73,881	65.29%	37,543	33.18%	1,730	1.53%	36,338	32.11%	113,154
Cape May	11,572	41.07%	16,178	57.41%	429	1.52%	-4,606	-16.34%	28,179
Cumberland	14,830	53.30%	12,455	44.77%	537	1.93%	2,375	8.53%	27,822
Essex	106,472	77.17%	29,527	21.40%	1,975	1.43%	76,945	55.77%	137,974
Gloucester	37,131	52.86%	31,717	45.11%	1,456	2.07%	5,414	7.75%	70,304
Hudson	68,165	78.37%	16,707	19.21%	2,109	2.42%	51,458	59.16%	86,981
Hunterdon	14,241	38.68%	21,709	58.97%	864	2.35%	-7,468	-20.29%	36,814
Mercer	52,476	65.80%	25,749	32.29%	1,524	1.91%	26,727	33.51%	79,749
Middlesex	83,732	59.96%	53,679	38.44%	2,244	1.61%	30,053	21.52%	139,655
Monmouth	67,011	44.89%	79,417	53.20%	2,863	1.92%	-12,406	-8.31%	149,291
Morris	49,920	42.88%	64,688	55.57%	1,807	1.55%	−14,768	−12.69%	116,415
Ocean	55,631	40.32%	79,254	57.44%	3,082	2.23%	-23,623	-17.12%	137,967
Passaic	52,533	60.62%	32,612	37.64%	1,508	1.74%	19,921	22.98%	86,653
Salem	8,060	44.54%	9,304	51.41%	733	4.05%	-1,244	-6.87%	18,097
Somerset	37,124	48.59%	37,835	49.52%	1,448	1.90%	−711	−0.93%	76,407
Sussex	12,722	35.28%	22,292	61.82%	1,046	2.90%	-−9,570	-26.54%	36,060
Union	68,051	65.03%	60,758	33.20%	1,855	1.77%	7,293	31.83%	130,664
Warren	8,609	36.41%	14,150	59.85%	884	3.74%	-5,541	-23.44%	23,643
Totals	1,043,866	55.84%	791,297	42.33%	34,372	1.83%	252,569	13.51%	1,869,535

==== By congressional district ====
Booker won seven of 12 congressional districts, including one that elected a Republican.

District	Booker	Bell	Representative
1st	62.47%	35.86%	Donald Norcross
2nd	47.49%	50.35%	Frank LoBiondo
3rd	48.02%	50.08%	Tom MacArthur
4th	44.27%	53.8%	Chris Smith
5th	49.65%	48.62%	Scott Garrett
6th	58.29%	39.98%	Frank Pallone Jr.
7th	44.21%	53.7%	Leonard Lance
8th	79.05%	18.75%	Albio Sires
9th	66.9%	31.19%	Bill Pascrell
10th	86.1%	12.25%	Donald Payne Jr.
11th	47.18%	51.31%	Rodney Frelinghuysen
12th	64.23%	34.13%	Bonnie Watson Coleman

== See also ==
- United States Senate special election in New Jersey, 2013
- 2014 United States Senate elections
- 2014 United States elections
