= Murray Sabrin =

German-born American professor of finance

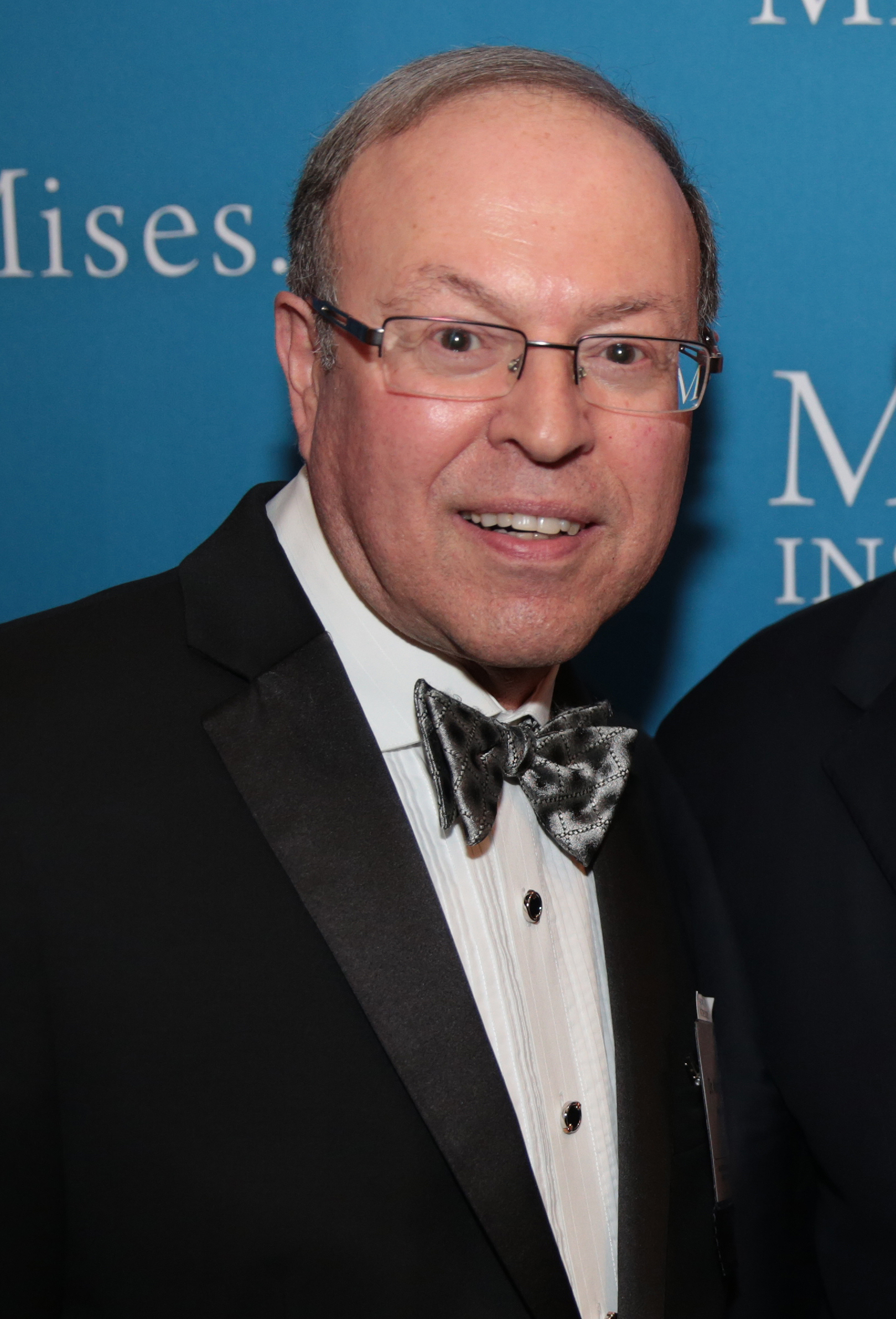
- Sabrin in 2017
- Born: December 21, 1946 (age 79); Bad Wörishofen, Germany

Academic background
- Education: Rutgers University; Lehman College; Hunter College

Academic work
- Discipline: Financial economics
- School or tradition: Austrian School
- Institutions: Ramapo College of New Jersey

Murray Sabrin (born December 21, 1946) is a professor of finance in the Anisfield School of Business at Ramapo College and a perennial candidate for public office in New Jersey.

== Family, education, and affiliations ==
Sabrin was born in Bad Wörishofen, Germany, on December 21, 1946. His parents, being of Jewish ancestry, were among the only people in his family to survive the Holocaust. Sabrin has said "during World War Two, my father, a Jewish resistance fighter in Lithuania, fought for his freedom and his life with a gun. I'm alive today because of him." Sabrin arrived in the U.S. with his older brother and parents in August 1949 and became a United States citizen in 1959.

He lived with his wife, Florence, in Fort Lee, New Jersey. He moved to Florida in 2021.

Sabrin has a Ph.D. in geography from Rutgers University, an M.A. in social studies education from Lehman College and a B.A. in history, geography and social studies education from Hunter College. He has worked in commercial real estate sales and marketing, personal portfolio management, and economic research.

Sabrin is the former executive director of the Center for Business and Public Policy at Ramapo College, and is the author of Tax Free 2000: The Rebirth of American Liberty.

== Policy advocacy and opinion writing ==
Sabrin's articles have appeared in The Record (Hackensack, New Jersey), The Star Ledger, Trenton Times, and Asbury Park Press. His essays have also appeared in Commerce Magazine, Mid-Atlantic Journal of Business, Privatization Review, and LewRockwell.com. Sabrin is a contributing columnist for NJBIZ and writes a column on the economy for START-IT magazine. He is a regular columnist for NJVoices and USADaily.

He is writing a book on politics, the economy and culture titled Velvet Fascism: How the Political Elites Transformed America.

== Political career ==
Sabrin was the 1997 Libertarian Party gubernatorial candidate in New Jersey, and the first third party candidate to receive matching funds and participate in three official debates. He garnered 5% of the vote in the election, and the race went to Christine Todd Whitman. In 2008 Sabrin ran as a candidate for the Republican Party nomination for the United States Senate representing New Jersey, where he faced Republican state Senator Joseph Pennacchio and former Republican Congressman Dick Zimmer. Promoting limited government and noninterventionism, he received endorsements from the Republican Liberty Caucus and U.S. Presidential candidate Ron Paul. He garnered 14% of the vote, behind Zimmer (46%) and Pennacchio (40%). He sought the Republican nomination to the same seat in 2014, but lost to Jeff Bell.

In January 2018, he announced his intention to run for the U.S. Senate again, this time under the New Jersey Libertarian Party.

== Political positions ==
=== Abortion ===
Sabrin is anti-abortion. During the 2014 election, he wrote a letter criticizing Senate candidate Brian Goldberg on his pro-choice position.

=== Foreign policy ===
Sabrin is an outspoken supporter of a non-interventionist foreign policy.

== Bibliography ==
- Tax Free 2000: The Rebirth of American Liberty. Presscott Pr. 1995. ISBN 0-933451-25-3.
- "The Correct Cure for Health Care". NJBIZ. Journal Publications, Inc. 2005-05-10. Archived from the original on February 12, 2012.
- "A Counterproductive Ideology in Trenton". NJBIZ. Journal Publications, Inc. 2005-07-12. Archived from the original on February 12, 2012.
- "The Smart Way to Judge a Candidate". NJBIZ. Journal Publications, Inc. 2005-09-30. Archived from the original on February 12, 2012.
- "Bernanke Policies Will Be Stop-and-Go". NJBIZ. Journal Publications, Inc. 2005-11-07. Archived from the original on February 12, 2012.
- "Downsize the State's Bloated Budget". NJBIZ. Journal Publications, Inc. 2006-02-13. Archived from the original on October 19, 2008.
- "Letter to the Governor About Our Future". NJBIZ. Journal Publications, Inc. 2006-05-01. Archived from the original on February 8, 2012.
- "Corzine's Ideas Need Better Strategy". NJBIZ. Journal Publications, Inc. 2006-10-09. Archived from the original on January 1, 2010.
- "Corzine's First-Year Report Card". NJBIZ. Journal Publications, Inc. 2007-01-01. Archived from the original on January 1, 2010.
- "Corzine's Plan Perpetuates Nanny State". NJBIZ. Journal Publications, Inc. 2007-03-19. Archived from the original on February 5, 2010.
- "New Jersey Wants the U.S. Out of Iraq". NJBIZ. Journal Publications, Inc. 2007-06-04. Archived from the original on February 5, 2010.
- "We Need Free Enterprise, Not Debt". NJBIZ. Journal Publications, Inc. 2007-08-20. Archived from the original on February 5, 2010.
