= 1978 United States Senate election in New Jersey =

- November 7, 1978
- Turnout: 57% (▼27pp)
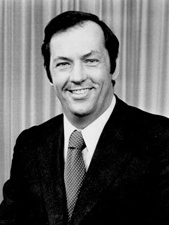

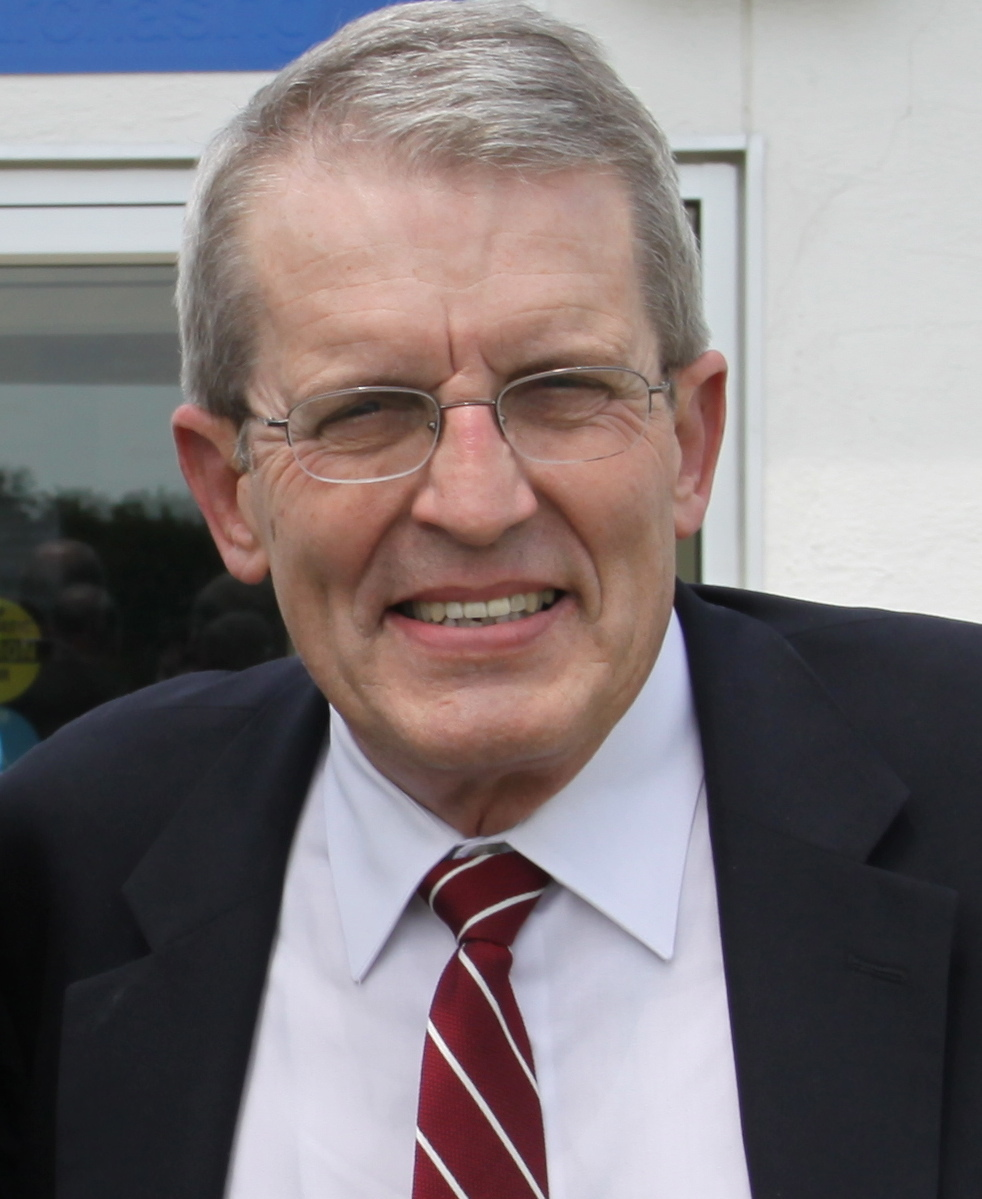
Nominee	Bill Bradley	Jeff Bell
Party	Democratic	Republican
Popular vote	1,082,960	844,200
Percentage	55.32%	43.13%
- County results Bradley: 50–60% 60–70% 70–80% Bell: 40–50% 50–60%
U.S. senator before election
Clifford P. Case
Republican
Elected U.S. Senator
Bill Bradley
Democratic

The 1978 United States Senate election in New Jersey was held on November 7, 1978. Incumbent Senator Clifford P. Case ran for re-election to a fifth term in office, narrowly losing the Republican primary by anti-tax conservative Jeff Bell, who lost the general election to Democrat Bill Bradley. Bell was the unsuccessful Republican nominee for this seat again in 2014.

Primary elections were held on June 6, 1978. Case was defeated by Bell, a political novice forty years his junior, while Bradley easily won the Democratic primary over State Treasurer Richard Leone and state senator Alexander Menza.

This was the first time Democrats won this seat since 1936, and the first time since 1938 that Democrats held both seats in the state.

== Republican primary ==
=== Background ===
In 1972, U.S. Senator Clifford P. Case won re-election to a fourth term in office by a record 780,000 votes. He was the ranking Republican on the United States Senate Committee on Foreign Relations. In his political career, which covered over twelve elections in the course of forty years, Case had lost only one race for New Jersey General Assembly in 1941. However, he had a reputation as a liberal internationalist and commonly drew challengers in the Republican primary.

Beginning in 1974, Jeff Bell was a top policy advisor to former Governor of California Ronald Reagan and a leading architect of his supply-side economics platform during the 1976 Republican primary campaign against Gerald Ford. In 1976, Bell left the Ronald Reagan presidential campaign and relocated to New Jersey with the express intent of challenging Clifford Case, the long-time incumbent Senator and bête noire of conservative Republicans.

=== Candidates ===
- Jeff Bell, political aide and speechwriter for Ronald Reagan's 1976 presidential campaign
- Clifford P. Case, incumbent U.S. Senator since 1955

=== Campaign ===
Bell ran an energetic, active campaign centered around his advocacy of supply-side economics. Case, on the other hand, largely ignored his challenger, remained in Washington attending to his legislative duties, and spent only about $100,000. He was the only major candidate in either primary who did not use television commercials, and he also generally disfavored telephone banks, direct mailing, and internal polling. He ignored advice from advisors to take the challenge seriously, at least in order to get a running start on the general election.

The core policy proposal of Bell's campaign was a large federal income tax cut for the purpose of stimulating domestic investment, similar to the plan proposed in Congress by William Roth and Jack Kemp. Under Bell's plan, the top marginal rate would be cut by 20 percentage points, and lower rates would be cut by 30 percentage points across the board. Case countered that the proposal would be "enormously inflationary."

Bell also criticized Case on foreign policy, referring to him as "too liberal", in particular for his vote in favor for the Torrijos–Carter Treaties. Bell also advocated the sale of military planes to Egypt and other Arab states, which Case had voted against due to his strong support for Israel. Late in the campaign, Case moderated his position, stating that he could support aid to Egypt but wanted moderate Arab leaders to recognize "the right of Israel to exist". He reinforced his commitment to "a strong Israel" and continued to oppose any "even-handed" approach in the Middle East.

=== Endorsements ===
Case had the support of every Republican member of the state legislature and 20 out of 21 county chairmen. Some municipal chairmen supported Bell.

Case made particular use of former U.S. attorney Jonathan L. Goldstein, who served as his campaign counsel and had prosecuted former party chairman Nelson G. Gross and Bergen County chair Anthony Statile, as a campaign surrogate.

=== Polling ===
Poll source	Date(s) administered	Sample size (Note: Key: A – all adults RV – registered voters LV – likely voters V – unclear)	Jeff Bell	Clifford Case	Undecided
Rutgers-Eagleton	May 7–16, 1978	LV	8%	43%	49%
Associated Press/WNBC	May 1978	700 (RV)	14%	50%	36%

=== Results ===
Republican primary results by county Bell: 50–60%; 60–70%; Case: 50–60%; 60–70%

In conceding defeat, Case remarked, "It was an interesting campaign; it fooled everyone. The turnout was very light and perhaps that indicated a deep unhappiness of the voters with the people of authority and power. I shall continue to believe in the Republican Party and to support it." He applauded Bell as a "nice young man" but said that he remained convinced that Bell would not have a chance of winning the general election.

Republican primary results
Party	Candidate	Votes	%
Republican	Jeff Bell	118,555	50.74
Republican	Clifford P. Case (incumbent)	115,082	49.26
Total votes		233,637	100.00

=== Aftermath and legacy ===
On June 8, following further reflection, Case expressed no regret over his campaign strategy and attributed his defeat to "the dissatisfaction of people with government." Party leadership, in particular former assembly speaker Thomas Kean, criticized Case for his "longtime reluctance to use modern campaign techniques."

Case declined to endorse Bell for the general election.

Bell's victory, which was held the same night as popular tax reform referendums in California and Ohio, was taken as a symbol of a broader anti-tax sentiment in the United States, which culminated in the 1980 election of Ronald Reagan and a Republican majority in Congress. In 2018, following Bell's death, Robert W. Merry of The American Conservative credited Bell as the first candidate to run on a supply-side platform and, along with Jack Kemp, Jude Wanniski, and Robert Bartley, one of the founders of the supply-side movement.

== Democratic primary ==
=== Candidates ===
- Wesley K. Bell, former mayor of Stafford Township
- Bill Bradley, former professional basketball player
- Richard Leone, former New Jersey State Treasurer
- Alexander J. Menza, state senator from Hillside
- Kenneth C. McCarthy
- Ray Rollinson, perennial candidate

==== Withdrew ====
- Andrew Maguire, U.S. representative from Ridgewood (withdrew February 6, 1978; ran for re-election)

==== Declined ====
- Frank J. Guarini, chair of the Hudson County Democratic Organization and former state senator (declined January 27, 1978; ran for U.S. representative)

=== Endorsements ===
Bill Bradley

U.S. representatives

- Jim Florio, U.S. representative from New Jersey's 1st congressional district
Frank J. Guarini (declined)

Local officials

- Thomas F. X. Smith, mayor of Jersey City
Richard Leone

State legislators

- Angelo Errichetti, state senator and mayor of Camden

=== Debates ===
No.	Date and time	Host	Moderator	Link	Participants			
P Present A Absent I Invited N Not invited Out Out of race W Withdrawn					Bradley	Leone	Maguire	Menza
1	January 20, 1978	WPIX11	John Hamilton	N/A	P	P	P	

=== Polling ===
Poll source	Date(s) administered	Sample size	Bill Bradley	Richard Leone	Alexander Menza	Undecided
Rutgers-Eagleton	May 7–16, 1978	LV	16%	12%	3%	69%
Associated Press/WNBC	May 1978	700 (RV)	37%	9%	3%	51%

=== Results ===
Democratic primary results by county Bradley: 50–60%; 60–70%; 70–80%; Leone: 40–50%

Democratic primary results
Party	Candidate	Votes	%
Democratic	Bill Bradley	217,502	58.90
Democratic	Richard Leone	97,667	26.45
Democratic	Alexander J. Menza	32,386	8.77
Democratic	Kenneth C. McCarthy	9,524	2.58
Democratic	Wesley K. Bell	8,800	2.38
Democratic	Ray Rollinson	3,374	0.91
Total votes		369,253	100.00

== General election ==
=== Candidates ===
- Jeff Bell, political aide and speechwriter for Ronald Reagan's 1976 presidential campaign (Republican)
- Robert Bowen (Labor)
- Bill Bradley, former professional basketball player (Democratic)
- J.M. Carter (God We Trust)
- Alice Conner (Socialist Workers)
- Bill Gahres (Down With Lawyers)
- Paul Ferguson (Socialist Labor)
- Jasper C. Gould (Independent)
- Jack Moyers (Libertarian)
- Herbert H. Shaw, perennial candidate (Politicians are Crooks)
- William R. Thorn (Independent)

=== Polling ===
Poll source	Date(s) administered	Sample size	Bill Bradley (D)	Jeffrey Bell (R)	Other/ Undecided
Rutgers-Eagleton	May 7–16, 1978	793 RV	36%	17%	47%
Rutgers-Eagleton	Sept. 19–Oct. 1, 1978	883 RV	49%	24%	27%
Rutgers-Eagleton	October 23–29, 1978	946 RV	50%	32%	18%
Rutgers-Eagleton	October 23–29, 1978	510 LV	51%	40%	9%

Hypothetical polling

with Case

Poll source	Date(s) administered	Sample size	Margin of error	Clifford Case (R)	Bill Bradley (D)	Richard Leone (D)	Alex Menza (D)	Other/ Undecided
Rutgers-Eagleton	May 7–16, 1978	1007 A	±4.0%	37%	27%	–	–	36%
Rutgers-Eagleton	May 7–16, 1978	1007 A	±4.0%	44%	–	24%	–	32%
Rutgers-Eagleton	May 7–16, 1978	1007 A	±4.0%	43%	–	–	18%	40%

with Bell

Poll source	Date(s) administered	Sample size	Margin of error	Jeffrey Bell (R)	Richard Leone (D)	Alex Menza (D)	Other/ Undecided
Rutgers-Eagleton	May 7–16, 1978	620 LV	±?%	18%	29%	–	54%
Rutgers-Eagleton	May 7–16, 1978	620 LV	±?%	19%	–	22%	59%

=== Results ===
1978 United States Senate election in New Jersey
Party	Candidate	Votes	%	±%
Democratic	Bill Bradley	1,082,960	55.32%	▲20.81
Republican	Jeff Bell	844,200	43.13%	▼19.33
Independent	Herbert H. Shaw	4,736	0.24%	N/A
Independent	Bill Gahres	3,817	0.20%	N/A
Libertarian	Jack Moyers	3,809	0.20%	N/A
U.S. Labor	Robert Bowen	3,656	0.19%	N/A
Independent	J.M. Carter	3,618	0.19%	N/A
Independent	Jasper C. Gould	2,955	0.15%	N/A
Independent	William R. Thorn	2,776	0.14%	N/A
Socialist Labor	Paul Ferguson	2,604	0.13%	▼0.23
Socialist Workers	Alice Conner	2,384	0.12%	N/A
Total votes		1,957,515	100.00%	
Democratic gain from Republican				

==== By county ====
County	Bradley votes	Bradley %	Bell votes	Bell %	Other votes	Other %
Atlantic	29,097	55.2%	22,888	43.4%	712	1.3%
Bergen	145,408	52.6%	128,152	46.4%	2,901	1.0%
Burlington	44,424	53.0%	38,542	46.0%	906	1.1%
Camden	72,703	59.7%	47,178	38.7%	1,946	1.6%
Cape May	12,682	48.5%	13,032	49.8%	434	1.6%
Cumberland	16,009	54.6%	12,637	43.1%	678	2.3%
Essex	118,596	62.6%	68,503	36.2%	2,249	1.2%
Gloucester	28,593	55.8%	21,801	42.6%	837	1.6%
Hudson	104,245	71.4%	39,054	26.8%	2,662	1.9%
Hunterdon	9,301	42.1%	12,267	55.5%	521	2.3%
Mercer	51,579	60.6%	32,736	38.5%	750	0.9%
Middlesex	91,526	60.2%	57,837	38.0%	2,646	1.7%
Monmouth	75,647	53.7%	63,587	45.1%	1,699	1.2%
Morris	46,961	44.0%	58,015	54.4%	1,708	1.6%
Ocean	49,448	48.4%	51,109	50.0%	1,635	1.6%
Passaic	52,924	54.3%	42,348	43.5%	2,176	2.2%
Salem	9,341	51.3%	8,523	46.8%	338	1.8%
Somerset	26,131	44.5%	31,569	53.7%	1,042	1.8%
Sussex	11,111	41.6%	15,149	56.7%	478	1.8%
Union	76,131	51.3%	68,784	46.3%	3,512	2.4%
Warren	11,103	50.2%	10,489	47.4%	525	2.3%
Total	1,082,960	55.3%	844,200	43.1%	30,355	1.6%

Counties that flipped from Republican to Democratic

- Atlantic
- Bergen
- Burlington
- Camden
- Cumberland
- Essex
- Gloucester
- Hudson
- Mercer
- Middlesex
- Monmouth
- Passaic
- Salem
- Warren
- Union
