= 1997 New Jersey gubernatorial election =

- November 4, 1997
- Turnout: 56% (▼9pp)
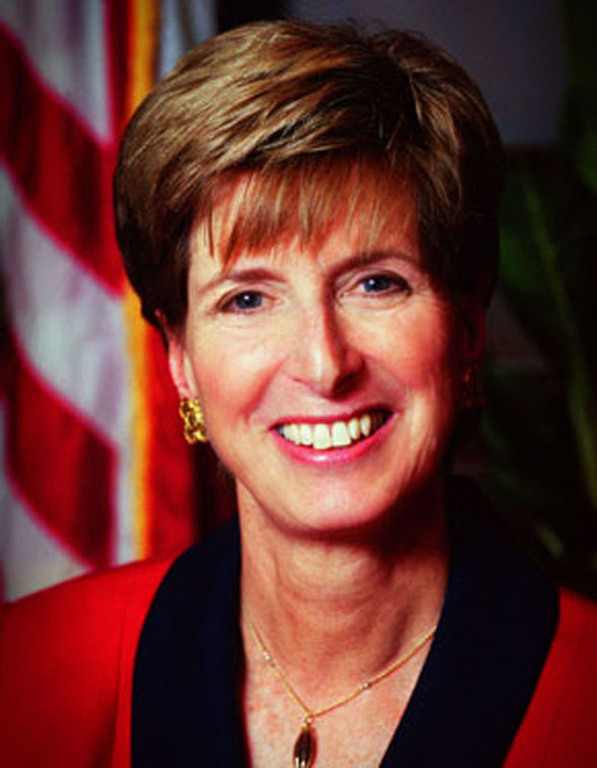

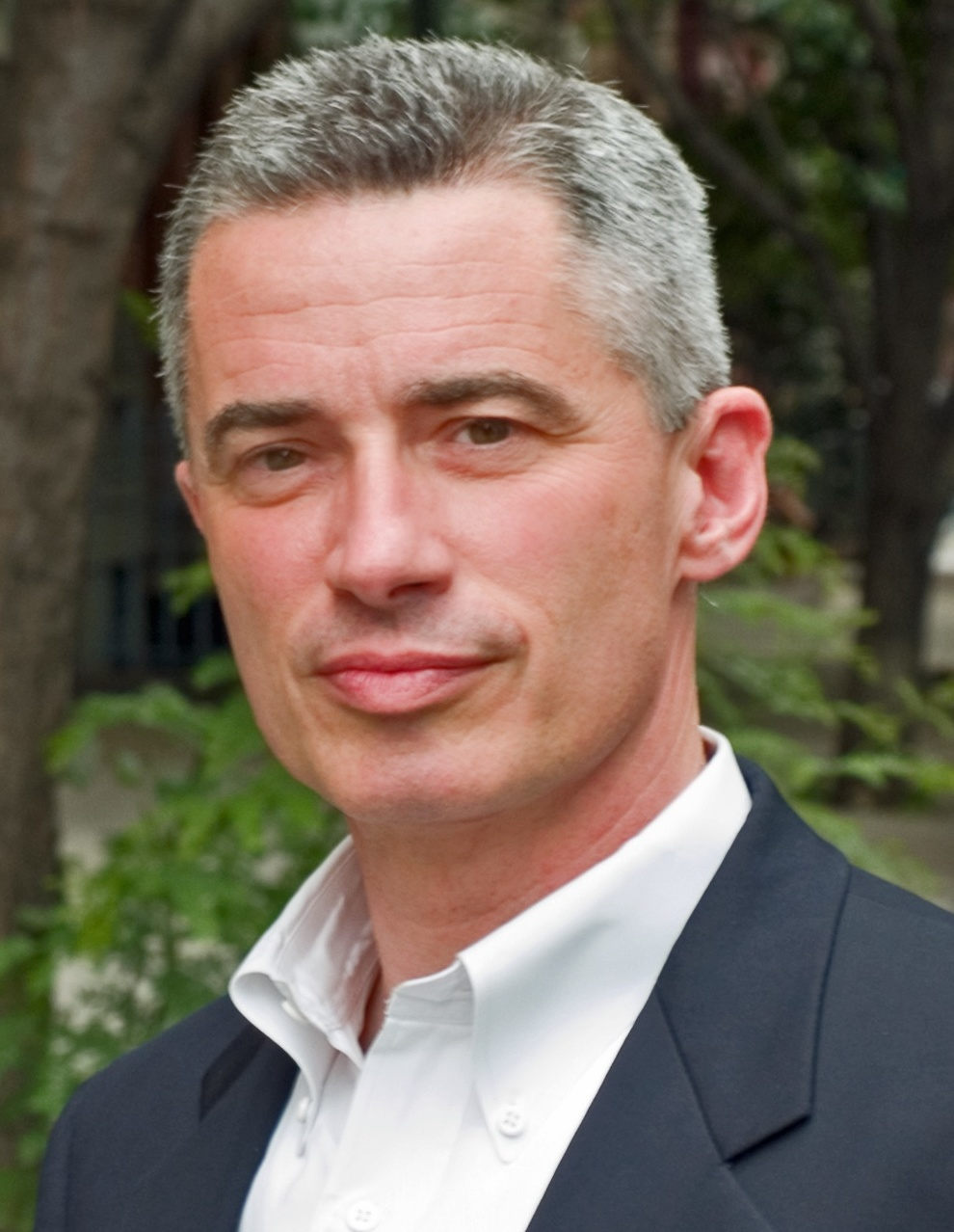
Nominee	Christine Todd Whitman	Jim McGreevey
Party	Republican	Democratic
Popular vote	1,133,394	1,107,968
Percentage	46.87%	45.82%
- Whitman: 40–50% 50–60% 60–70% McGreevey: 40–50% 50–60% 60–70% 70–80%
Governor before election
Christine Todd Whitman
Republican
Elected Governor
Christine Todd Whitman
Republican

The 1997 New Jersey gubernatorial election was held on November 4, 1997. In the Democratic primary, state senator and Woodbridge Township mayor Jim McGreevey defeated U.S. Representative Rob Andrews by 9,993 votes. In the general election, Republican Governor Christine Todd Whitman defeated McGreevey by 26,953 votes. Whitman won 46.87% of the vote, with McGreevey receiving 45.82% and Libertarian Murray Sabrin receiving 4.7%.

== Republican primary ==
=== Candidates ===
- Christine Todd Whitman, incumbent Governor of New Jersey

=== Results ===
Republican Party primary results
Party	Candidate	Votes	%
Republican	Christine Todd Whitman (incumbent)	147,731	100.00
Total votes		147,731	100.00

== Democratic primary ==
=== Candidates ===
- Jim McGreevey, mayor of Woodbridge and state senator
- Rob Andrews, U.S. Representative from Haddon Heights
- Michael Murphy, Morris County Prosecutor and stepson of former governor Richard J. Hughes
- Frank C. Marmo, perennial candidate

=== Results ===
Democratic primary results by county McGreevey: 40–50%; 50–60%; 60–70%; 70–80%; Andrews: 50–60%; 60–70%; 70–80%; 80–90%; Murphy: 40–50%; 60–70%

Democratic Party primary results
Party	Candidate	Votes	%
Democratic	Jim McGreevey	148,153	39.86
Democratic	Rob Andrews	138,160	37.17
Democratic	Michael Murphy	79,172	21.30
Democratic	Frank C. Marmo	6,189	1.67
Total votes		371,674	100

== General election ==
=== Candidates ===
- Madelyn R. Hoffman, Flanders grassroots activist (Green)
- James McGreevey, state senator and mayor of Woodbridge (Democratic)
- Robert B. Miller, Newark assembly line worker (Socialist Workers)
- Lincoln Norton, Morristown software executive (Natural Law)
- Greg Pason, Hackensack small businessman (Socialist)
- Michael Perrone Jr., Little Ferry liquor store owner (Progressive)
- Richard J. Pezzullo, Freehold computer consultant (Conservative)
- Nuncie A. Ripa Jr., Hammonton excavation contractor (Independent)
- Murray Sabrin, Ramapo College professor (Libertarian)
- Christine Todd Whitman, incumbent governor since 1994 (Republican)

=== Campaign ===
In June, a 60-second radio ad paid for by the New Jersey Republican Party focused on the 30% income tax cut and 180,000 new jobs. Whitman's ads blamed McGreevey for the state's auto insurance rates. The Whitman campaign emphasized the drops in unemployment, violent crime and welfare rolls during her term. Other ads took aim at McGreevey's record on taxes, particularly his support for former Gov. Jim Florio's (D) tax increase. The RNC criticized former Gov. Jim Florio (D) in an ad October, calling his 1990 tax increase a result of electing "liberal Democrats".

In September, McGreevey unveiled two TV ads criticizing Whitman and focusing on property taxes, auto insurance rates, pension bond debts, and education standards. The Democratic National Committee also spent $1 million during the home stretch of the campaign on television ads for Democratic candidates statewide. In October, a poll found that voters of NJ called auto insurance the most important issue in the campaign, and property taxes second.

=== Polling ===
Poll source	Date(s) administered	Sample size	Margin of error	Jim McGreevey (D)	Christine Todd Whitman (R)	Murray Sabrin (L)	Other	Undecided
Rutgers-Eagleton	June 6–8, 1997	602 RV	±3.5%	38%	44%	—	18%	
Rutgers-Eagleton	June 11–16, 1997	613 RV	±3.5%	33%	49%	—	18%	
Rutgers-Eagleton	September 2–7, 1997	673 RV	±3.5%	35%	47%	—	18%	
Rutgers-Eagleton	September 2–7, 1997	673 RV	±3.5%	32%	47%	3%	18%	
Quinnipiac College	September 8–13, 1997	865	±3.3%	37%	49%	—	4%	10%
Rutgers-Eagleton	October 12–15, 1997	631 RV	±3.5%	40%	45%	—	15%	
Rutgers-Eagleton	October 12–15, 1997	631 RV	±3.5%	38%	42%	6%	14%	
Quinnipiac College	October 14–20, 1997	1,120	±2.9%	37%	45%	8%	1%	9%
New York Times/CBS News	October 25–29, 1997	1,082	±3.0%	33%	44%	8%	3%	12%
Rutgers-Eagleton	October 28–31, 1997	613 LV	±3.0%	36%	45%	9%	18%	

=== Results ===
This was the first gubernatorial election in the state since 1949 where a Republican won without Passaic County.

New Jersey gubernatorial election, 1997
Party	Candidate	Votes	%	±%
Republican	Christine Todd Whitman (incumbent)	1,133,394	46.87%	▼2.46
Democratic	Jim McGreevey	1,107,968	45.82%	▼2.47
Libertarian	Murray Sabrin	114,172	4.72%	▲4.40
Conservative	Richard J. Pezzullo	34,906	1.44%	▲1.24
Green	Madelyn R. Hoffman	10,703	0.44%	N/A
Independent	Michael Perrone, Jr.	6,805	0.28%	N/A
Socialist Workers	Robert B. Miller	2,816	0.12%	▲0.07
Socialist	Greg Pason	2,800	0.12%	N/A
Natural Law	Lincoln Norton	2,540	0.11%	N/A
Independent	Nuncie A. Ripa, Jr.	2,240	0.09%	N/A
Plurality		25,426	1.05%	▲0.01
Turnout		2,418,344		
Republican hold		Swing		

==== Results by county ====
County	Whitman votes	Whitman %	McGreevey votes	McGreevey %	Other votes	Other %
Atlantic	31,364	47.3%	29,091	43.9%	5,791	8.7%
Bergen	148,934	53.3%	118,834	42.5%	11,903	4.3%
Burlington	55,523	43.5%	60,690	47.5%	11,485	9.0%
Camden	51,643	35.7%	82,028	56.7%	10,933	7.6%
Cape May	18,227	49.6%	15,395	41.9%	3,159	8.6%
Cumberland	13,651	36.5%	19,977	53.5%	3,729	10.0%
Essex	69,470	35.3%	120,429	61.2%	6,778	3.4%
Gloucester	30,314	38.4%	41,082	52.1%	7,519	9.5%
Hudson	47,468	35.6%	80,526	60.4%	5,394	4.0%
Hunterdon	24,465	59.5%	10,983	26.7%	5,698	13.8%
Mercer	44,056	40.8%	54,977	50.9%	8,905	8.3%
Middlesex	83,149	39.3%	110,354	52.2%	17,911	5.5%
Monmouth	105,535	53.9%	74,098	37.8%	16,189	8.3%
Morris	97,414	65.4%	41,296	27.7%	10,252	6.9%
Ocean	84,897	53.8%	57,944	36.7%	15,076	9.5%
Passaic	55,541	45.2%	60,256	49.1%	6,966	5.7%
Salem	10,686	49.9%	8,790	41.0%	1,950	9.1%
Somerset	51,465	57.4%	29,089	32.4%	9,154	10.2%
Sussex	25,458	60.4%	11,331	26.9%	5,332	12.7%
Union	68,721	46.6%	69,673	47.2%	9,065	6.1%
Warren	15,413	50.8%	11,125	36.7%	3,793	12.5%

==== Counties that flipped from Democratic to Republican ====
- Atlantic
- Cape May

==== Counties that flipped from Republican to Democratic ====
- Burlington
- Mercer
- Passaic
