= 1982 United States Senate election in New Jersey =

- November 2, 1982
- Turnout: 62% (▼19pp)
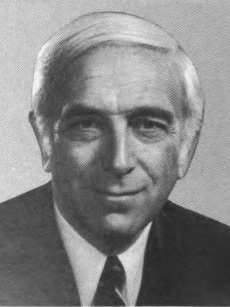

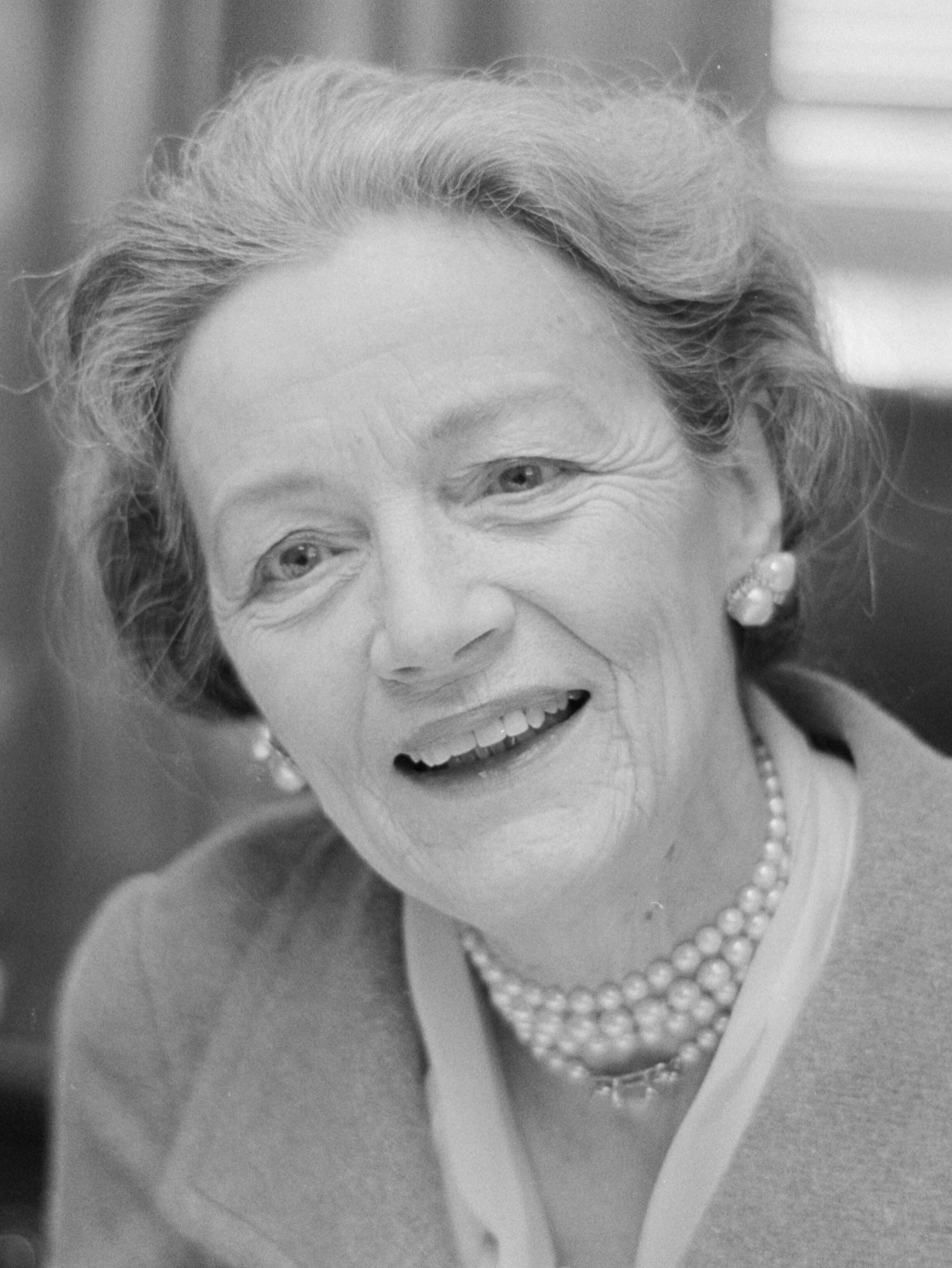
Nominee	Frank Lautenberg	Millicent Fenwick
Party	Democratic	Republican
Popular vote	1,117,549	1,047,626
Percentage	50.94%	47.75%
- Lautenberg: 40–50% 50–60% 60–70% 70–80% Fenwick: 40–50% 50–60% 60–70%
U.S. senator before election
Nicholas F. Brady
Republican
Elected U.S. Senator
Frank Lautenberg
Democratic

The 1982 United States Senate election in New Jersey was held on November 2, 1982. The seat was effectively vacated by the resignation of Harrison Williams amid scandal in March; his appointed successor, Nicholas F. Brady, did not run.

Democratic businessman Frank Lautenberg won the seat in a major upset, defeating a large field of eight Democratic candidates and Republican Millicent Fenwick, a popular, well-known U.S. Representative. Lautenberg's campaign was largely self-funded and overcame early polling leads for Fenwick by outspending her 2-to-1 and emphasizing the persistently poor economic conditions under Republican President Ronald Reagan and the conservative Congress.

== Background ==
=== Interim appointment ===
The seat had been occupied by Democrat Harrison A. Williams, who resigned on March 11, 1982, after being implicated in the Abscam scandal. After Williams' resignation, Republican Governor Thomas Kean appointed Republican Nicholas F. Brady to the seat. Brady served in the Senate through the primary and general elections but did not run for the seat himself.

== Republican primary ==
=== Candidates ===
- Millicent Fenwick, U.S. Representative from Bernardsville
- Jeff Bell, political consultant and nominee for the U.S. Senate in 1978

==== Withdrew ====
- Robert J. Morris, anti-communist activist and candidate in 1960 (withdrew May 8 and remained neutral)

==== Declined ====
- Nicholas Brady, incumbent Senator (appointed April 12) and businessman
- Jim Courter, U.S. Representative from Hackettstown

=== Campaign ===
Fenwick, an extremely popular Congresswoman, centered much of her primary campaign on her electability, name recognition, and ability to win down-ballot races for local Republican candidates. Bell framed himself as a strong supporter, or even architect, of President Reagan's economic platform, blaming the Federal Reserve Board's high interest rates for slow economic growth. Fenwick instead blamed the large federal budget deficit and called for cuts to public works spending, while preserving social services. The New York Times therefore framed the race as a referendum on the Reagan administration's economic policies. Bell himself admitted, "If I lose, I think a lot of obituaries are going to be written for Reaganomics." Bell's campaign may have been undercut when President Reagan blamed the federal budget deficit for high inflation, thereby endorsing Fenwick's economic platform, though not the candidate herself.

Both Bell and Fenwick supported a freeze on nuclear weapons contingent on the United States surpassing the Soviet Union's arsenal, while Morris opposed a de jure freeze, arguing that a de facto freeze already existed. Morris also supported a sharp increase in military spending to deter Soviet expansion into the Middle East and Western Hemisphere and proposed American intervention in the Falklands War to force both Argentina and the United Kingdom to withdraw, citing the Monroe Doctrine. He also challenged New York City mayor Ed Koch, then running for Governor, to swim from Manhattan to the Jersey Shore to bring attention to pollution.

After the first debate, Morris withdrew from the race, saying that he had made his point and did not have the funding to continue. Though he chose to remain neutral, his withdrawal was seen to benefit Bell, a fellow conservative. Bell admitted he had asked Morris to withdraw, though he did not know how much effect this had.

Near the end of the primary, Bell unsuccessfully sought the endorsement of Governor Tom Kean.

=== Polling ===
Late in the campaign, Fenwick's aides cited her polling lead at 15 percentage points.

=== Results ===
Fenwick defeated by Bell with 54% of the vote. Bell called Fenwick at 11 P.M. on election night to concede. He maintained his interpretation that his defeat was a referendum on Reaganomics and that Fenwick's victory was a sign that voters rejected Reagan's policies.

Results by county: Fenwick: 50–60%; 60–70%; 70–80%; Bell: 50–60%

Republican Party primary results
Party	Candidate	Votes	%
Republican	Millicent Fenwick	193,683	54.28%
Republican	Jeff Bell	163,145	45.72%
Total votes		356,828	100.00

== Democratic primary ==
=== Candidates ===
- Angelo Bianchi, former State Banking Commissioner
- Frank Forst, former Jamesburg mayor
- Frank Lautenberg, financial executive
- Joseph A. LeFante, former U.S. representative from Bayonne
- Andrew Maguire, former U.S. representative from Ridgewood
- Richard D. McAleer, car leasing agent
- Howard Rosen, attorney
- Barbara Boggs Sigmund, Mercer County freeholder
- Cyril Yannarelli, Passaic County freeholder

==== Withdrew ====
- Donald Cresitello, former Morristown mayor (withdrew May 27 and endorsed LeFante)

The first candidate to enter the race was Howard Rosen, a lawyer from Millburn. Representatives Andrew Maguire and Joseph LeFante both had large bases in their home counties, Bergen and Hudson respectively. Frank Lautenberg, the CEO of ADP, had no natural political base and had never run for office, but had a well-financed media campaign and courted key endorsements.

The last major candidate to join the race was Barbara Boggs Sigmund, a Mercer County Freeholder from Princeton and the daughter of late House Majority Leader Hale Boggs and Congresswoman Lindy Boggs. Sigmund campaigned for the newly drawn 7th congressional district for much of the spring, but joined the Senate race after being recruited by Democratic Congressmen Robert A. Roe, James J. Howard, and William J. Hughes. She announced her campaign just one hour before the filing deadline, on the anniversary of her father's birthday.

Donald Cresitello, a former mayor of Morristown, and Richard McAleer, a car-leasing manager, were also late entries.

=== Campaign ===
The Democratic primary was previewed in The New York Times as a "free-for-all," with ten candidates entering before the April 30 filing deadline and no clear favorite.

Lautenberg's campaign was largely self-funded, giving him an advantage in a year when Democratic fundraising was hard to come by following Williams's scandal and James Florio's narrow, expensive loss in the 1981 election for governor. His campaign spending was criticized by LeFante.

Sigmund had support from liberals and some labor elements. She ran a spirited, if brief and underfunded campaign, emphasizing her gender and women's issues, arguing a woman was best suited to take on Fenwick in the fall campaign. At her campaign announcement, Sigmund said that a race between herself and Fenwick "would be the most exciting campaign in the country." She also cited women's perceived compassion and mediating skills as beneficial in politics. One Sigmund supporter referred to the primary race as "Snow White and the Nine Dwarfs."

Sigmund's campaign likely cost Andrew Maguire the endorsement of Mercer County Democrats and women's groups, two groups that had favored him before her entry. Sigmund may also have cut into Maguire's support with labor and Black voters. Sigmund also drew funding and organizational help from Washington.

LeFante's campaign had the key support of the Hudson County Democratic machine, which was expected to deliver him 50,000 votes, about half of what was expected to be necessary to win. Sigmund herself called him the front-runner.

Rosen, who spent $1,000,000 and campaigned vigorously, was forced to cease campaigning late in the race due to a kidney ailment.

In the final weeks, Maguire focused his campaign on North and Central Jersey, making 32 stops at train stations, shopping malls, and factories. Lautenberg and LeFante both campaigned in North Jersey, while Sigmund campaigned with Anne Clark Martindell and Claude Pepper in Trenton.

On election night, the results swung back and forth, with Lautenberg, Maguire, and LeFante each holding the lead several times. Lautenberg claimed victory at 11:40 P.M. and Maguire conceded shortly after. LeFante declined to concede immediately, saying he would wait until Wednesday to re-examine the votes.

=== Results ===
Lautenberg won a narrow victory with 26% of the vote to 23% for Maguire and 20% for LeFante. Sigmund ran fourth with 11%. Lautenberg had no strong regional base, but stayed close enough to Maguire in Bergen and LeFante in Hudson to carry the state on the back of narrow victories throughout the rest of the state.

Some Maguire supporters suggested that he would have won had Sigmund not joined the race; the Maguire campaign itself denied this, arguing that Sigmund pulled from all candidates.

Results by county: Lautenberg: 20–30%; 30–40%; 40–50%; 50–60%; Maguire: 30–40%; 60–70%; LeFante: 30–40%; 60–70%; Sigmund: 20–30%; 30–40%; 40–50%

Democratic Party primary results
Party	Candidate	Votes	%
Democratic	Frank Lautenberg	104,666	25.97%
Democratic	Andrew Maguire	92,878	23.05%
Democratic	Joseph A. LeFante	81,440	20.21%
Democratic	Barbara Boggs Sigmund	45,708	11.34%
Democratic	Howard Rosen	28,427	7.05%
Democratic	Angelo Bianchi	17,684	4.39%
Democratic	Cyril Yannarelli	10,188	2.53%
Democratic	Frank Forst	9,563	2.37%
Democratic	Richard D. McAleer	8,110	2.01%
Democratic	Donald Cresitello (withdrawn)	4,295	1.07%
Total votes		402,959	100.00

==== Impact of ballot positioning ====
Estimates at the time suggested 5 to 10 percent of ballots were cast for the first name on the ballot regardless of candidate. The only county Maguire won outside his native Bergen was also the only county where he had the first position, Hunterdon. Likewise, LeFante only won his native Hudson and two counties where he had top position (Cape May and Gloucester). Richard McAleer, who spent no money on his campaign, won more than half his votes in Mercer, Union, and Warren, where he led the ballot. In Union, he finished ahead of higher profile candidates like Sigmund and LeFante.

== General election ==
=== Candidates ===
- Robert T. Bastien (Grassroots)
- Millicent Fenwick, U.S. representative from Bernardsville (Republican)
- Henry Koch (Libertarian)
- Frank Lautenberg, financial executive (Democratic)
- Julius Levin (Socialist Labor)
- Claire Moriarty (Socialist Workers)
- Rose Zeidwerg Monyek, perennial candidate (Repeal TF 807)
- Martin E. Wendelken, perennial candidate (Independent)

=== Campaign ===
After the primary, Lautenberg's campaign got off to a rocky start, as polls put Fenwick ahead by as much as 18 points and most figured that she was assured victory in November. Even many Democrats assumed their goal was to keep her margin low enough to preserve Democratic chances for local offices. Lautenberg quipped that his opponent was "the most popular candidate in the country." But Lautenberg waged an aggressive, self-funded campaign against Fenwick, outspending her two-to-one. He emphasized partisan differences by tying Fenwick to President Ronald Reagan and Senator Strom Thurmond and attacking her personally, calling her "erratic" and "eccentric."

Lautenberg faced an early problem when he claimed that Hudson County Democratic leaders asked him to pay off Joseph A. LeFante's primary campaign debts and barred his staff from U.S. representative Frank J. Guarini's district campaign offices until he paid. Jersey City mayor Gerald McCann denied that he had requested any payment and accused Lautenberg of threatening Hudson County officials by supporting primary challengers in local elections if they withheld their support.

In October, the campaign intensified after Lautenberg attacked Fenwick as "a little eccentric," quoting former President Gerald Ford. Lautenberg also said she was "erratic in terms of proposals, work and programs." He denied this was an attack on her age and said he was not challenging her "fitness to serve" but her "ability to do the job." By the month's end, both candidates acknowledged the race had drawn much closer. Lautenberg compared his campaign to Mario Cuomo's in the summer New York Democratic primary, in which he trailed Ed Koch by a wide margin in all polls but won a major upset.

Fenwick continued to hammer her independence and criticized Lautenberg for distorting her record. Her campaign was particularly hurt by the Lautenberg campaign's claim that, "If Fenwick goes to the Senate, she'll support voting-rights opponent Strom Thurmond." Fenwick had been a long-time member of the NAACP since before she entered politics and objected strongly to the accusation. Lautenberg responded, "Mrs. Fenwick's anger has apparently overtaken her... I think that when she comes up with that kind of a campaign after complimenting me a couple of weeks ago for my gentlemanly way of campaigning and turns now, instead of defending her record, to talk about mud slinging, shows how desperate she is." He did not withdraw the charges, but instead returned Fenwick's charge of mudslinging: "Mrs. Fenwick's campaign has taken a radical turn, changing from one where she presented herself as a public servant to one where personality became an issue."

On October 27, Lautenberg held a rally with Ted Kennedy at the Robert Treat Hotel in Newark with 1,200 in attendance. Fenwick toured a housing project in East Orange and took interviews with New Jersey Network and a Spanish-language channel. On October 31, after the final debate, Lautenberg campaigned with former Vice President Walter Mondale and Second Lady Joan Mondale.

=== Polling ===
Early polling indicated a large lead for Fenwick, as much as 18 percentage points. However, this polling narrowed considerably by the end of October. Public polls showed Lautenberg had pulled even or ahead. Nevertheless, Fenwick's campaign said internal polling gave her a lead of no less than 5 percentage points and as much as 7.

An October survey by the Eagleton Institute of Politics found that six out of seven undecided voters said that Fenwick's sex made no difference and one in ten said they would be more likely to vote for Fenwick because she was a woman. Sixty percent of all voters said sex made no difference, while 26 percent said they preferred a female and 14 percent preferred a male.

Poll source	Date(s) administered	Sample size (Note: Key: A – all adults RV – registered voters LV – likely voters V – unclear)	Margin of error	Frank Lautenberg (D)	Millicent Fenwick (R)	Other / Undecided
The Star-Ledger/Eagleton	May–June 1982	822 LV	?%	24%	41%	35%
Rutgers-Eagleton Poll	September 14–25, 1982	756 RV	±3.7%	32%	50%	18%
Rutgers-Eagleton Poll	September 14–25, 1982	457 LV	±4.7%	32%	51%	17%
Rutgers-Eagleton Poll	October 18–23, 1982	500 LV	?%	40%	45%	15%
Rutgers-Eagleton Poll	October 24–26, 1982	600 LV	?%	41%	44%	15%
Hackensack Record	October 27, 1982	? LV	?%	41%	42%	17%

==== Previously undecided voters ====
Poll source	Date(s) administered	Sample size	Margin of error	Frank Lautenberg (D)	Millicent Fenwick (R)	Other / Undecided
Rutgers-Eagleton	November 1, 1982	330 LV	±4.0%	45%	46%	11%

=== Debates ===
The second debate, sponsored by the New Jersey Chamber of Commerce and hosted by the Birchwood Manor on October 3, centered on economic issues. Fenwick criticized Lautenberg for claiming to have created 16,000 jobs, most of which she said were created by acquisitions. Lautenberg denied this and said his business was created by "hard work." Lautenberg referred to Fenwick's congressional and legislative voting record as "anti-job," criticizing her vote to cut federally underwritten college loans. Fenwick criticized Lautenberg's support of an "American-made" bill that she said would cost 15,000 American jobs. The candidates also disagreed over the Economic Recovery Tax Act of 1981, for which Fenwick voted. Lautenberg said the Act did too little to reduce inflation and that the appropriate way to cut unemployment was to fund technological training and fund transportation. Fenwick said that Lautenberg's criticism of spending cuts "reflects the old appetite for bigger government and more spending." Fenwick did criticize Reagan for imposing sanctions on a Soviet pipeline, expressing sympathy for "Solidarity and Polish dissidents" but saying that the sanctions "cost[] jobs in the United States."

Fenwick described Lautenberg's performance in the fifth debate as "kind of pathetic."

The sixth and final debate was held on October 31 and "reflected both the apparent closeness of the race and the acrimony that has often marked its final stages." Fenwick emphasized her image and character, and again criticized Lautenberg's campaign as outrageously deceptive. Lautenberg defending his campaign spending as "highlight[ing] her record" and attacked the national Republican slogan of "stay the course." He blamed her criticism on tightening polls. Jobs and the economy remained the major issue. Lautenberg contended that Fenwick supported cuts to Social Security benefits, which she denied.

Lautenberg directly defended his campaign literature tying Fenwick to Strom Thurmond, arguing that while he was "not accusing Mrs. Fenwick of anti-voting rights views," her victory would preserve the Republican Senate majority and thereby empower Thurmond. After the debate, Fenwick said she would prefer a new chair of the Senate Judiciary Committee to replace Thurmond.

=== Endorsements ===
Millicent Fenwick (R)

Federal executive branch officials

- Ronald Reagan, 40th President of the United States
- Gerald Ford, 38th President of the United States
- Bill Brock, U.S. Trade Representative and former U.S. Senator from Tennessee

U.S. Senators

- Bob Packwood, U.S. Senator from Oregon

U.S. Representatives

- James Courter, U.S. Representative from Hackettstown
- Matt Rinaldo, U.S. Representative from Union Township

State officials

- Thomas Kean, Governor of New Jersey

Newspapers

- Asbury Park Press
- The Bridgewater Courier News
- Burlington County Times
- The Trentonian
Frank Lautenberg (D)

Federal executive branch officials

- Walter Mondale, former Vice President of the United States

U.S. Senators

- Ted Kennedy, U.S. Senator from Massachusetts
- Daniel Patrick Moynihan, U.S. Senator from New York

Newspapers

- The Hackensack Record
- The New Brunswick Home News
- The New York Times
- The Philadelphia Inquirer
- The Trenton Times

=== Results ===
Lautenberg won by 69,923 votes, in what was considered a major upset.

General election results
Party	Candidate	Votes	%	±%
Democratic	Frank Lautenberg	1,117,549	50.94%	▼9.72
Republican	Millicent Fenwick	1,047,626	47.75%	▲9.40
Libertarian	Henry Koch	9,934	0.45%	▼0.27
Socialist Labor	Julius Levin	5,580	0.25%	▼0.08
Independent	Martin E. Wendelken	4,745	0.22%	N/A
Socialist Workers	Claire Moriarty	3,726	0.17%	N/A
Grassroots	Robert T. Bastien	2,955	0.14%	N/A
Repeal TF 807	Rose Zeidwerg Monyek	1,830	0.08%	N/A
Total votes		2,193,945	100.00%	
Democratic hold				

==== Results by county ====
County	Lautenberg %	Lautenberg votes	Fenwick %	Fenwick votes	Other %	Other votes
Atlantic	53.7%	30,801	44.7%	25,606	1.6%	901
Bergen	48.5%	147,811	50.7%	154,691	0.8%	2,582
Burlington	49.4%	48,035	49.6%	48,215	1.0%	958
Camden	57.9%	75,389	41.0%	53,394	1.2%	1,534
Cape May	43.5%	12,875	55.1%	16,310	1.3%	394
Cumberland	54.4%	17,834	43.5%	14,250	2.1%	689
Essex	60.6%	126,766	38.1%	79,654	1.3%	2,672
Gloucester	54.1%	33,409	44.2%	27,280	1.7%	1,067
Hudson	69.4%	97,636	29.0%	40,766	1.6%	2,306
Hunterdon	32.3%	8,340	65.4%	16,896	2.3%	605
Mercer	54.1%	52,593	44.7%	43,431	1.2%	1,171
Middlesex	53.9%	94,351	44.6%	78,067	1.6%	2,769
Monmouth	47.2%	76,430	51.5%	83,457	1.4%	2,207
Morris	33.1%	41,134	66.1%	82,251	0.8%	1,031
Ocean	44.5%	55,046	54.8%	67,701	0.7%	878
Passaic	56.0%	61,397	41.4%	45,353	2.6%	2,891
Salem	49.9%	9,994	47.6%	9,528	2.5%	495
Somerset	31.3%	22,030	68.3%	48,067	0.4%	313
Sussex	36.6%	11,506	62.0%	19,498	1.4%	435
Union	49.97%	83,436	48.6%	81,211	1.4%	2,325
Warren	46.6%	10,736	52.0%	12,000	1.4%	319

Counties that flipped from Democratic to Republican

- Bergen
- Burlington
- Cape May
- Hunterdon
- Monmouth
- Morris
- Ocean
- Somerset
- Sussex
- Warren

== Aftermath ==
Brady, who had just a few days left in his appointed term, resigned on December 27, 1982, allowing Lautenberg to take office several days before the traditional swearing-in of senators, which gave him an edge in seniority over the other freshman senators.

After her term expired in January, Fenwick retired from electoral politics. President Reagan appointed her United States Ambassador to the United Nations Agencies for Food and Agriculture and she served from 1983 to 1987. The age issue would be used against Lautenberg in his own re-election bid in 2008.

== See also ==
- 1982 United States Senate elections
