= Jeff Bell (politician) =

American politician

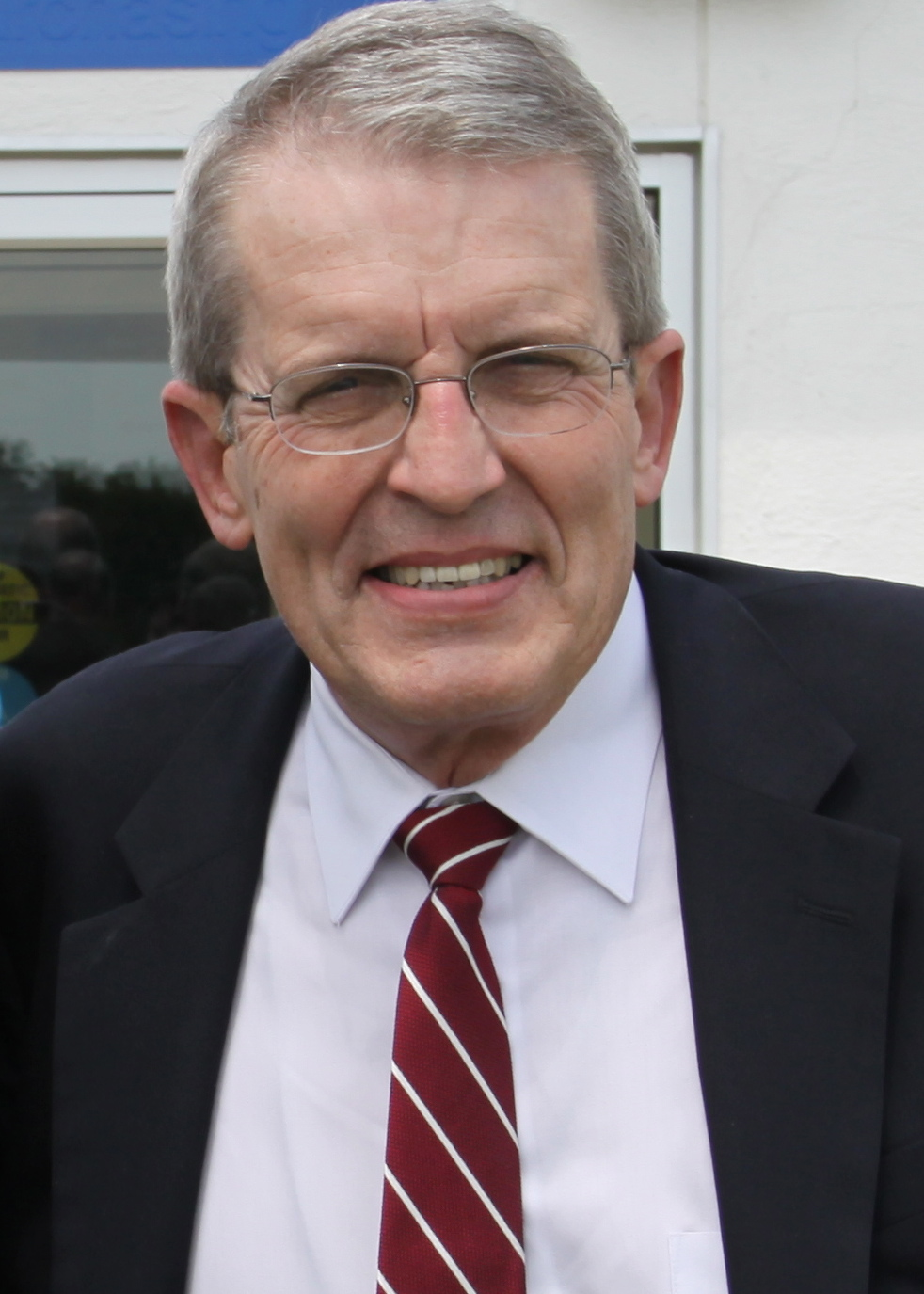

Personal details
- Born: Jeffrey Langley Bell; December 13, 1943 Washington, D.C., U.S.
- Died: February 10, 2018 (aged 74) Annandale, Virginia, U.S.
- Party: Republican
- Spouse: Rosalie O'Connell (m. 1983)
- Children: 4
- Education: Columbia University (BA)

Military service
- Allegiance: United States
- Branch/service: United States Army
- Battles/wars: Vietnam War • Tet Offensive

Jeffrey Langley Bell (December 13, 1943 – February 10, 2018) was an American Republican Party politician, political consultant, author, and presidential speechwriter. He was the Republican nominee for the United States Senate from New Jersey in 1978, was a candidate for the Republican nomination for the Senate in 1982, and was the nominee against Democratic incumbent Cory Booker in 2014.

== Early life and education ==
A native of Washington, D.C., Bell was a 1965 graduate of Columbia University in New York City and a veteran of the Vietnam War's Tet Offensive.

== Academic and consultancy work ==
Bell was a former president of the Manhattan Institute, served as a fellow of the Harvard Institute of Politics at Harvard University; a visiting professor at the Eagleton Institute of Politics at Rutgers University; and as the DeWitt Wallace Fellow in Communications at the American Enterprise Institute in Washington. He most recently served on the board of directors of the American Conservative Union and of the Campaign Finance Institute at George Washington University. Bell was also a visiting scholar at the Ethics and Public Policy Center.

From 1988 to 2000, Bell served as president of Lehrman Bell Mueller Cannon, an economic and political forecasting company based in Arlington, Virginia. A principal of Capital City Partners from 2000 to 2012, a public affairs firm, Bell participated in the firm's contract with the United States Department of Health and Human Services to promote greater awareness of human trafficking in the United States. From 2010 to 2014, Bell was the director of policy of the American Principles Project (APP), a Washington-based advocacy group. He headed APP's "Gold Is Money" project, which advocates a return to the gold standard in the United States.

== Political career ==
=== Early work ===
Bell worked as an aide to Presidents Richard Nixon and Ronald Reagan and to U.S. Representative Jack Kemp of New York.

In the 1968 presidential election, Bell was working on the Nixon presidential campaign. On the evening of the Robert F. Kennedy assassination after the California primary, Bell happened to be the only staffer on hand at the Nixon campaign headquarters and made the phone call to the former vice-president's senior staff to notify them of Senator Kennedy's shooting.

=== Reagan's "$90 Billion" speech ===
In 1975, Bell was responsible for a speech given by Ronald Reagan when he was running against President Gerald Ford in the Republican presidential primaries. In it, Reagan proposed a "systematic transfer of authority and resources to the states - a program of creative federalism for America's third century. Federal authority has clearly failed to do the job. Indeed, it has created more problems in welfare, education, housing, food stamps, Medicaid, community and regional development, and revenue sharing, to name a few. The sums involved and the potential savings to the taxpayer are large. Transfer of authority in whole or part in all of these areas would reduce the outlay of the federal government by more than $90 billion, using the spending levels of fiscal 1975. With such a savings it would be possible to balance the federal budget, make an initial $5 billion payment on the national debt and cut the federal personal income tax of every American by an average of 23 percent."

Bell's speech was intended to provide Reagan with a philosophical edge over President Ford. The Ford campaign, however, seized on it as evidence that in primary states like New Hampshire, which pay no state sales tax or income tax, that the state would have to come up with its own funds for programs. Reagan lost the New Hampshire primary to Ford, and the Bell policy was interpreted by some as a contributing factor.

=== 1980 Reagan television spots ===
In 1980, Bell produced and co-wrote the television commercials used by the Reagan presidential campaign in New Hampshire and subsequent primaries. The commercials, which focused on Reagan's policy to fight inflation by lowering taxes, were highly effective in boosting Reagan's popularity in the primary polls.

In The Reagan Revolution (Rowland Evans and Robert Novak, 1981), the effectiveness of these commercials is addressed:

It is no exaggeration to say that those Curson-Bell spots... were indispensable to Reagan's solution of his basic political and ideological problems–a solution necessary for him to win the presidency.

=== Other political work ===
Bell was elected as a Reagan delegate from New Jersey to the Republican National Convention in 1980. As deputy chairman of the pro-Reagan group Citizens for America, Bell was actively involved in the passage of the Tax Reform Act of 1986.

In addition to his work on the 1980 Reagan campaign, Bell was on the national campaign staff for Richard Nixon in 1968 and Reagan in 1976. In 1988, Bell served as the national campaign coordinator for Kemp for President and in 2000 he worked as a senior consultant to Gary Bauer's short-lived presidential campaign.

=== 2014 U.S. Senate candidacy ===
In February 2014 Bell rented a home in Leonia, New Jersey and announced he would run for the Republican nomination to challenge incumbent Democratic senator Cory Booker, running on an anti-Federal Reserve and populist platform. He narrowly won a four-way Republican primary on June 3, 2014, securing the nomination. Some of his promises are to restore the prosperity of the middle class by restoring the value of the dollar and not the value of the gold. By giving education that children deserve, promote legal immigration. Jeff Bell lost to Cory Booker in a 42.4% to 55.8% percentage vote respectively, approximately the same percentages as in the 1978 Bell-Bradley Senate race 36 years earlier. The popular vote results were 1,016,204 for Cory Booker and 772,991 for Jeff Bell.

== Personal life and death ==
Bell married to Rosalie O'Connell in 1983, and they had four children. At the time of his death, he resided in Annandale, Virginia. Bell died from cardiac arrest on February 10, 2018, at age 74.

== Books ==
External videos
- Booknotes interview on Populism and Elitism, July 12, 1992, C-SPAN

Bell authored two books on modern American politics. The first, Populism and Elitism: Politics in the Age of Equality, published in 1992, was called by political journalist Fred Barnes, then with The New Republic, "the most important political book" of 1992. His second book, The Case for Polarized Politics: Why America Needs Social Conservatism, was published by Encounter Books on March 6, 2012. James Taranto in a February 2012 Wall Street Journal article, summarized the Bell thesis as follows:

Social conservatism, Mr. Bell argues in his forthcoming book, The Case for Polarized Politics, has a winning track record for the GOP. Social issues were nonexistent in the period 1932 to 1964. The Republican Party won two presidential elections out of nine, and they had the Congress for all of four years in that entire period. . . . When social issues came into the mix—I would date it from the 1968 election . . . the Republican Party won seven out of 11 presidential elections.

Bell discussed his book on an August 19, 2012 C-SPAN Washington Journal program. C-SPAN Bell Interview Bell has also written articles for numerous publications, most recently The Washington Post, The Wall Street Journal, and The Weekly Standard.

Party political offices
Preceded by Clifford Case	Republican nominee for U.S. Senator from New Jersey (Class 2); 1978	Succeeded by Mary Mochary
Preceded by Steve Lonegan	Republican nominee for U.S. Senator from New Jersey (Class 2); 2014	Succeeded by Rik Mehta
