= Ronald Reagan 1976 presidential campaign =

Campaign of Ronald Reagan for the election to President of the United States in 1976

Ronald Reagan for President 1976
- Campaign: 1976 United States presidential election
- Candidate: Ronald Reagan; Governor of California (1967–1975); Richard Schweiker; U.S. Senator from Pennsylvania (1969–1981)
- Affiliation: Republican Party
- Status: Announced: November 20, 1975; Lost nomination: August 18, 1976
- Key people: John Sears (campaign manager)

Ronald Reagan announced his candidacy for President of the United States on November 20, 1975. He won primaries in several states, but eventually lost the nomination to incumbent president Gerald Ford at the 1976 Republican National Convention.

== Background ==
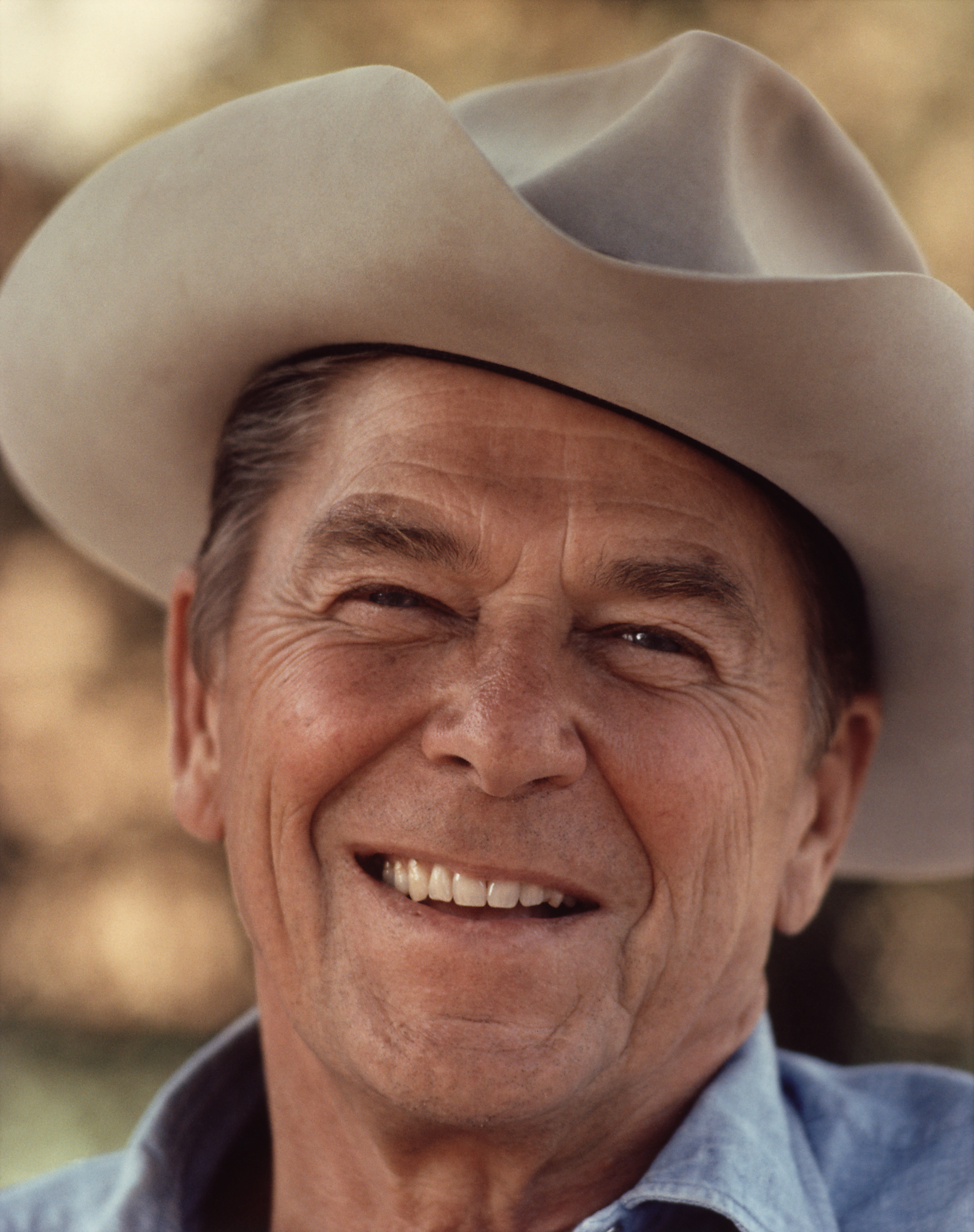
Reagan in 1976

When Time in November 1975 discussed possible running mates for incumbent President of the United States Gerald Ford, among them was Ronald Reagan. The magazine stated that the former Governor of California was the favorite of conservatives but "could enter a different race altogether", referring to possibly challenging Ford for the party's presidential nomination in 1976.

Reagan did challenge Ford. He soon established himself as the conservative candidate with the support of like-minded organizations such as the Conservative Party of New York State and the American Conservative Union, which became key components of his political base, while Ford was considered a more moderate Republican.

Reagan had been viewed as a leading candidate for some time, and led a Gallup poll in October 1973 with 29% of the vote. In polling in June 1975, Ford led Reagan by 41%-20% in a large field, or 61%-33% in a head-to-head matchup.

At the height of the campaign, Reagan aide Edwin Meese conducted some research into the logistics of a presidential transition. Meese had conversations on the subject with people who had previously worked for Richard Nixon and Gerald Ford.

== Primaries ==
Reagan's campaign relied on a strategy crafted by campaign manager John Sears of winning a few primaries early to damage the inevitability of Ford's likely nomination.

In the run-up to the New Hampshire primary, Ford attacked Reagan's plan to cut $90 billion from the federal budget, as well as Reagan's plans for Social Security. Reagan's stump speeches included attacks on welfare queens, as well as other attacks on government welfare programs. After a heated campaign, Reagan lost by 1317 votes, 54,824-53,507.

Reagan would lose the next two competitive primaries, in Florida and Illinois. In Florida, Reagan lost 53%-47% and in Illinois by 59%-40%. Despite pressure to leave the race, Reagan pledged to stay in the race through the convention.

The Texas campaign lent renewed hope to Reagan, when he swept all 96 delegates chosen in the May 1 primary, with four more awaiting at the state convention. Much of the credit for that victory came from the work of three co-chairmen, including Ernest Angelo, the mayor of Midland, and Ray Barnhart of Houston, whom Reagan as president would appoint in 1981 as director of the Federal Highway Administration.

== Endorsements ==
List of Ronald Reagan endorsements

All individuals are members or supporters of the Republican Party, unless otherwise stated.

U.S. Senators

- Sen. Strom Thurmond (R-SC)
- Sen. Richard Schweiker (R-PA)
- Sen. Paul Laxalt (R-NV)
- Sen. James L. Buckley (C-NY)
- Sen. James A. McClure (R-ID)
- Sen. Jesse Helms (R-NC)

U.S. Representatives

- Rep. Thomas B. Curtis (R-MO) (1951–1967)
- Rep. H. R. Gross (R-IA) (1949–1975)
- Rep. Phil Crane (R-IL)
- Rep. Ron Paul (R-TX)
- Rep. John Ashbrook (R-OH)
- Rep. John Rousselot (R-CA)
- Rep. Steve Symms (R-ID)
- Rep. Robert Bauman (R-MD)
- Rep. John G. Schmitz (R-CA) (1969–1973)

State Officials

- Governor Louie Nunn (R-KY)
- Governor Meldrim Thomson Jr. (R-NH)

Celebrities

- Pat Boone
- Yvonne De Carlo
- Irene Dunne
- Fred MacMurray
- Merle Oberon
- Gilbert Roland
- Robert Stack
- James Stewart
- John Wayne
- Efrem Zimbalist Jr.

Other People

- Morton Blackwell
- Edwin Meese

== Convention ==
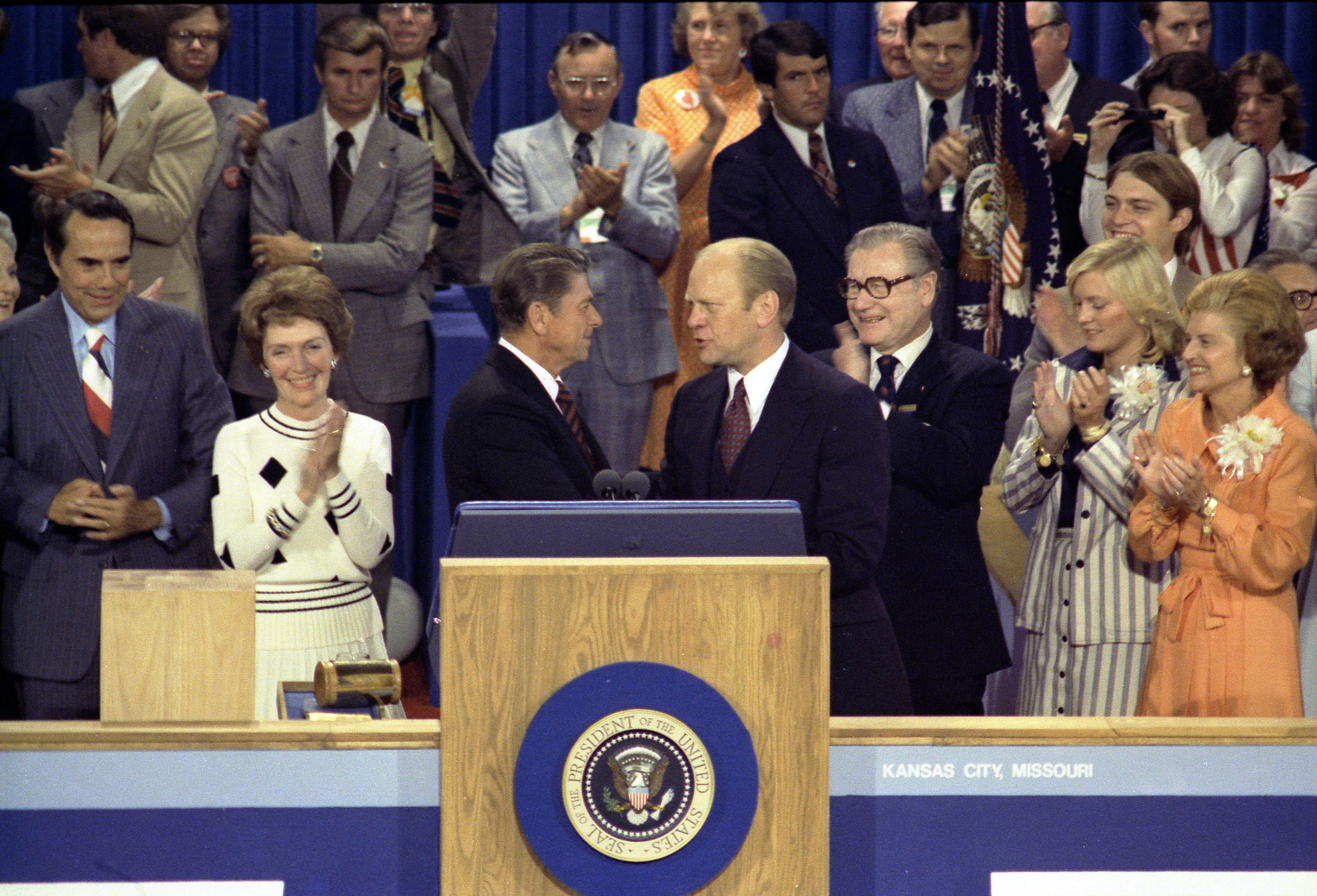
Reagan and President Gerald Ford shake hands on the podium after Reagan narrowly lost the nomination at the 1976 Republican National Convention

However, as the GOP convention neared, Ford appeared close to victory. Acknowledging his party's moderate wing, Reagan chose moderate Senator Richard Schweiker of Pennsylvania as his running mate if nominated. Nonetheless, Ford prevailed with 1,187 delegates to Reagan's 1,070.

"Reagan's impromptu concession speech has been called a "defining moment of the Reagan Revolution."

There was no scheduled time slot for the runner-up to deliver a formal concession speech; however, when Ford and Reagan met on the dais after Ford's acceptance speech, the president insisted that the former governor accompany him to the podium to deliver a few remarks. Reagan gave an eloquent and stirring speech that overshadowed Ford's own acceptance address, despite being little more than five minutes long. Some delegates later stated that they left the convention wondering if they had voted for the wrong candidate. A contemporary media account stated that if a motion to reconsider the nomination had been in order, it might have passed.

== Republican primary results ==
Republican presidential primary results: Red indicates a win by Reagan, blue a win by Ford.

Roll call vote for the presidential nomination by state delegations

1976 Republican Party presidential primaries * denotes incumbent
Party	Candidate	Aggregate votes	%	CW
Republican	Gerald Ford*	5,529,899	53.29	27 (Note: Gerald Ford won primaries in 26 states plus the District of Columbia primary.)
Republican	Ronald Reagan	4,760,222	45.88	24
Republican	Others	44,626	0.43	0
Republican	Unpledged	34,717	0.34	0

=== Republican National Convention ===
1976 Republican presidential nomination * denotes incumbent
Party	Candidate	Votes	%
Republican	Gerald Ford*	1,187	52.57
Republican	Ronald Reagan	1,070	47.39
Republican	Elliot Richardson	1	0.04

== Aftermath ==
Reagan campaigned for Ford in twenty states against the Democratic nominee, Jimmy Carter, who would win the general election. However, in Washington state, a faithless elector gave Reagan one electoral vote instead of Ford. In 1977, Ford told Lou Cannon that Reagan's primary challenge played a role in his own narrow loss to Carter.

== Bibliography ==
- Cannon, Lou (2003). Governor Reagan: His Rise to Power. PublicAffairs. ISBN 978-1-58648-284-8.
- Troy, Gil; Schlesinger, Arthur M.; Israel, Fred L. (2012). History of American Presidential Elections, 1789–2008. Vol. 3 (4 ed.). New York City: Facts on File. ISBN 978-0-8160-8220-9.
- Witcover, Jules (1977). Marathon : the pursuit of the Presidency, 1972-1976. Viking Press. ISBN 0670454613.
