= William P. Fitzpatrick (New Jersey politician) =

American politician

Member of the New Jersey General Assembly from the 9th district
- In office January 8, 1974 – March 1, 1975 Serving with Gertrude Berman
- Preceded by: newly created
- Succeeded by: Brian T. Kennedy; Anthony M. Villane

Personal details
- Born: September 28, 1940 Jersey City, New Jersey
- Died: March 1, 1975 (aged 34) Brick Township, New Jersey
- Party: Democratic
- Education: Seton Hall University

William P. Fitzpatrick (September 28, 1940 – March 1, 1975) was an American Democratic Party politician who represented the 10th legislative district in the New Jersey General Assembly from 1974 until his death in a car accident.

== Biography ==
Born in Jersey City, New Jersey, on September 28, 1940, Fitzpatrick graduated from Marist High School in Bayonne, and earned undergraduate and graduate degrees at Seton Hall University.

A resident of Point Pleasant, New Jersey, Fitzpatrick was a member of the Point Pleasant Borough Council and taught at Toms River High School North.

In the Democratic wave of the November 1973 general election, Fitzpatrick and his incumbent running mate Gertrude Berman defeated Republicans Brian T. Kennedy and Daniel S. Kruman, along with independent candidate William H. Jackson to win the two Assembly seats in the 10th district. In the early morning hours of March 1, 1975, Fitzpatrick was killed in a car accident.
