= Virginia E. Haines =

New Jersey politician

Ginny Haines

Member of the Ocean County Board of County Commissioners
- Incumbent
- Assumed office January 27, 2016 Serving with John Kelly
- Preceded by: James Lacey

Republican National Committeewoman from New Jersey
- In office June 2004 – March 2025
- Preceded by: Judith Stanley Coleman
- Succeeded by: Janice Fields

Executive Director of the New Jersey Lottery
- In office July 1994 – February 2002
- Preceded by: Frank M. Pelly
- Succeeded by: Virginia Bauer

Member of the New Jersey General Assembly from the 10th district
- In office January 7, 1992 – June 30, 1994 Serving with David W. Wolfe
- Preceded by: John Paul Doyle; Marlene Lynch Ford
- Succeeded by: James W. Holzapfel

Personal details
- Born: June 6, 1946 (age 79) Point Pleasant, New Jersey, U.S.
- Political party: Republican
- Education: Ocean County College

Virginia E. "Ginny" Haines (born June 6, 1946) is an American Republican Party politician from New Jersey who serves on the Ocean County Board of County Commissioners. She had served in the New Jersey General Assembly from 1992 to 1994 and had been appointed to head the New Jersey Lottery from 1994 to 2002.

== Personal life ==
Born in Point Pleasant, New Jersey on June 6, 1946, Haines graduated from Lakewood High School in 1964 and attended Ocean County College. She served on the Dover Township Municipal Utilities Authority and was the Clerk of the New Jersey General Assembly from May 1987 to January 1990.

== Elected office ==
A resident of Toms River (then Dover Township), Haines and her Republican running mates in the 1991 general election – David W. Wolfe for the second assembly seat and Andrew R. Ciesla for the State Senate – were elected to office in the 10th Legislative District, covering portions of both Monmouth County and Ocean County. The slate of Ciesla, Haines and Wolfe were all re-elected to office in November 1993.

Haines resigned from office on June 30, 1994, after Governor of New Jersey Christine Whitman nominated her to become executive director of the New Jersey Lottery to succeed Frank M. Pelly. She held the position until February 2002. James W. Holzapfel was appointed to fill the assembly seat vacated by Haines, taking office on August 15, 1994, before winning a November 1994 special election to serve the balance of Haines' term of office.

The Ocean County Republican committee selected Haines to fill the freeholder seat expiring in December 2016 that had been held by James F. Lacey until he resigned from office on December 31, 2015. On January 27, 2016, Haines was sworn into office on the Ocean County Board of chosen freeholders, making her the second woman – Hazel Gluck was the first – to serve as a freeholder since the governing body of Ocean County was established in 1850. She was appointed to serve as chairwoman of Human Services and as the liaison to Social Services. She was reelected in November 2016 and November 2019.

== Party offices ==
Haines has served as the New Jersey National Committeewoman for the Republican Party since June 2004 and was elected as the Co-Chair of the Republican National Committee Northeast Region in 2013. At the national party level, she has served as a member of the Ethics Committee, the Rules Committee and the Site-Selection Committee. She was chosen as a delegate to the 2008 and 2012 Republican National Convention.
