= Paul Kanitra =

American politician (born 1979)

Member of the New Jersey General Assembly from the 10th district
- Incumbent
- Assumed office January 9, 2024 Serving with Gregory P. McGuckin
- Preceded by: John Catalano

Personal details
- Born: August 2, 1979 (age 47)
- Party: Republican
- Education: Texas Christian University
- Website: Legislative webpage

Paul Kanitra (born August 2, 1979) is an American Republican Party politician serving as a member of the New Jersey General Assembly for the 10th legislative district, having taken office in January 2024.

== Biography ==
He graduated from Point Pleasant Beach High School and attended Texas Christian University. He worked in the office of Representatives Chris Smith and Mike Ferguson. Kanitra has been a resident of Point Pleasant Beach, New Jersey, and served as the borough's mayor since his election in 2019 until stepping down to take office in the General Assembly.

== Elective office ==
Kanitra and his incumbent running mate Gregory P. McGuckin defeated Democrats John Lamacchia and Emma Mammano in the 2023 New Jersey General Assembly election.

=== District 10 ===
Each of the 40 districts in the New Jersey Legislature has one representative in the New Jersey Senate and two members in the New Jersey General Assembly. The representatives from the 10th District for the 2026–2027 Legislative Session are:

- Senator James W. Holzapfel (R)
- Assemblyman Paul Kanitra (R)
- Assemblyman Gregory P. McGuckin (R)

== Electoral history ==
10th Legislative District General Election, 2023
Party	Candidate	Votes	%
Republican	Gregory P. McGuckin (incumbent)	34,805	33.0
Republican	Paul Kanitra	34,098	32.4
Democratic	Emma Mammano	18,529	17.6
Democratic	John LaMacchia	17,958	17.0
Total votes		105,390	100.0
Republican hold			
Republican hold			
