= William F. Dowd =

American politician

Member of the New Jersey General Assembly from the 10th district
- In office January 10, 1978 – January 12, 1982 Serving with Anthony M. Villane
- Preceded by: Brian T. Kennedy
- Succeeded by: John Paul Doyle; Warren Wolf

Personal details
- Born: November 11, 1943 Long Branch, New Jersey, U.S.
- Died: April 21, 2018 (aged 74) Long Branch, New Jersey, U.S.
- Party: Republican

William F. Dowd (November 11, 1943 – April 21, 2018) was an American politician who served in the New Jersey General Assembly from 1978 to 1982.

He died on April 21, 2018, in Long Branch, New Jersey at age 74.
