= David W. Wolfe =

American politician

David Wolfe

Member of the New Jersey General Assembly from the 10th district
- In office January 14, 1992 – January 14, 2020
- Preceded by: John Paul Doyle; Marlene Lynch Ford
- Succeeded by: John Catalano

Deputy Minority Leader of the New Jersey General Assembly
- In office January 8, 2008 – January 14, 2020
- Leader: Alex DeCroce; Jon Bramnick
- Preceded by: Kevin J. O'Toole
- Succeeded by: TBD

Personal details
- Born: October 11, 1942 (age 83) Williamsport, Pennsylvania
- Party: Republican
- Spouse: Carol A. Carmilli
- Children: Six
- Education: Westminster College (BA); University of Delaware (MEd)
- Occupation: College professor
- Website: Legislative Website

David W. Wolfe (born October 11, 1942) is an American Republican Party politician, who served in the New Jersey General Assembly from 1992 until 2020, where he represented the 10th Legislative District. Wolfe was the longest serving member of the Assembly.

== Early life ==
Wolfe served on the Brick Township Council from 1976 to 1991 and was its Council President from 1987 to 1988 and from 1980 to 1981. Wolfe serves as a member of the advisory board of the Garden State Rehabilitation Center. He earned the rank of Eagle Scout in 1956, and has been a longtime supporter of scouting, receiving the Good Scout Award from the Boy Scouts of America in 1988. Wolfe received a B.A. in 1964 from Westminster College in History and was awarded an M.Ed. in 1966 from the University of Delaware. He is a professor at Ocean County College. He was born in Williamsport, Pennsylvania, and is a resident of Brick Township.

== New Jersey Assembly ==
Wolfe served as Assistant Majority Leader from 1996 to 1998. He then served as Assistant Minority Leader from 2002 to 2008, when he was made Deputy Minority Leader. Wolfe announced on January 23, 2019 he wouldn't seek re-election in 2019.

=== Committees ===
- Education
- Environment and Solid Waste
- Joint Committee on the Public Schools

== Electoral history ==
=== Assembly ===
New Jersey general election, 2017
Party	Candidate	Votes	%	±%
Republican	Dave Wolfe	39,265	31.7	▼0.2
Republican	Gregory P. McGuckin	37,896	30.6	▲0.6
Democratic	Michael B. Cooke	23,417	18.9	▼0.9
Democratic	Raymond Baker	23,174	18.7	▲0.2
Total votes		'123,752'	'100.0'	

New Jersey general election, 2015
Party	Candidate	Votes	%	±%
Republican	Dave Wolfe	19,882	31.9	▼3.1
Republican	Gregory P. McGuckin	18,543	30.0	▼3.4
Democratic	Kimberley S. Casten	12,302	19.8	▲3.6
Democratic	Valter Must	11,513	18.5	▲3.1
Total votes		'62,240'	'100.0'	

New Jersey general election, 2013
Party	Candidate	Votes	%	±%
Republican	Dave Wolfe	44,627	35.0	▲3.0
Republican	Gregory P. McGuckin	42,586	33.4	▲2.7
Democratic	Susan Kane	20,647	16.2	▼3.1
Democratic	Amber Gesslein	19,658	15.4	▼2.6
Total votes		'127,518'	'100.0'	

New Jersey general election, 2011
Party	Candidate	Votes	%
Republican	Dave Wolfe	27,955	32.0
Republican	Gregory P. McGuckin	26,831	30.7
Democratic	Bette Wary	16,909	19.3
Democratic	Eli L. Eytan	15,698	18.0
Total votes		87,393	100.0

New Jersey general election, 2009
Party	Candidate	Votes	%	±%
Republican	David W. Wolfe	47,336	36.4	▲4.8
Republican	Jim Holzapfel	45,916	35.3	▲4.3
Democratic	Charles P. Tivenan	18,739	14.4	▼2.2
Democratic	Eli L. Eytan	18,090	13.9	▼2.4
Total votes		'130,081'	'100.0'	

New Jersey general election, 2007
Party	Candidate	Votes	%	±%
Republican	David W. Wolfe	29,619	31.6	▼0.7
Republican	Jim Holzapfel	29,014	31.0	▼0.7
Democratic	John Kaklamanis	15,560	16.6	▼1.2
Democratic	Salvatore Martino	15,282	16.3	▼1.4
Green	Elizabeth Arnone	2,226	2.4	N/A
Green	Matthew Q. Dimon	2,029	2.2	N/A
Total votes		'93,730'	'100.0'	

New Jersey general election, 2005
Party	Candidate	Votes	%	±%
Republican	David W. Wolfe	40,660	32.3	▲0.4
Republican	Jim Holzapfel	39,981	31.7	▲1.2
Democratic	Lawrence Jones	22,398	17.8	▲0.3
Democratic	Joni Jones	22,312	17.7	▲0.6
Socialist	Scott Baier	584	0.5	N/A
Total votes		'125,935'	'100.0'	

New Jersey general election, 2003
Party	Candidate	Votes	%	±%
Republican	David W. Wolfe	28,812	31.9	▲2.7
Republican	Jim Holzapfel	27,509	30.5	▲1.5
Democratic	Desmond Abazia	15,773	17.5	▼3.6
Democratic	Mark Troncone	15,418	17.1	▼3.7
Green	Elizabeth Arnone	2,765	3.1	N/A
Total votes		'90,277'	'100.0'	

New Jersey general election, 2001
Party	Candidate	Votes	%
Republican	David W. Wolfe	36,989	29.2
Republican	James W. Holzapfel	36,747	29.0
Democratic	John Furey	26,723	21.1
Democratic	Kimberley Casten	26,307	20.8
Total votes		126,766	100.0

New Jersey general election, 1999
Party	Candidate	Votes	%	±%
Republican	James W. Holzapfel	23,227	29.3	▼1.5
Republican	David W. Wolfe	23,145	29.2	▼2.0
Democratic	Stephanie Wauters	15,895	20.1	▲2.5
Democratic	Samuel D. Kaye	14,764	18.6	▲2.0
Conservative	Morgan Strong	1,105	1.4	▲0.6
Conservative	Anthony Bertani	1,058	1.3	▲0.3
Total votes		'79,194'	'100.0'	

New Jersey general election, 1997
Party	Candidate	Votes	%	±%
Republican	David W. Wolfe	41,746	31.2	▲2.3
Republican	James W. Holzapfel	41,117	30.8	▲2.0
Democratic	Regina Calandrillo	23,538	17.6	▼0.9
Democratic	Jim Margetis	22,239	16.6	▼0.9
Libertarian	Betty Florentine	1,381	1.0	N/A
Libertarian	Christopher Kawa	1,317	1.0	N/A
Conservative	Edward C. Mueller	1,292	1.0	▼2.1
Conservative	J. Morgan Strong	1,068	0.8	▼2.3
Total votes		'133,698'	'100.0'	

New Jersey general election, 1995
Party	Candidate	Votes	%	±%
Republican	David W. Wolfe	22,837	28.9	▼1.4
Republican	James W. Holzapfel	22,806	28.8	▼1.6
Democratic	Richard P. Strada	14,669	18.5	▼0.3
Democratic	Richard Sevrin	13,836	17.5	▼0.6
Conservative	Gary J. Rich	2,483	3.1	▲1.8
Conservative	Agnes A. James	2,455	3.1	▲1.9
Total votes		'79,086'	'100.0'	

New Jersey general election, 1993
Party	Candidate	Votes	%	±%
Republican	Virginia “Ginny” Haines	42,132	30.4	▼1.2
Republican	David W. Wolfe	42,010	30.3	▼0.6
Democratic	Thomas J. Mallon	26,101	18.8	▼0.4
Democratic	John F. Phillips	25,096	18.1	▼0.2
Conservative	Gary J. Rich	1,820	1.3	N/A
Conservative	Michael S. Permuko	1,647	1.2	N/A
Total votes		'138,806'	'100.0'	

New Jersey general election, 1991
Party	Candidate	Votes	%
Republican	Virginia “Ginny” Haines	35,093	31.6
Republican	David W. Wolfe	34,368	30.9
Democratic	Marlene Lynch Ford	21,384	19.2
Democratic	Paul C. Brush	20,311	18.3
Total votes		111,156	100.0

New Jersey General Assembly
Preceded by John Paul Doyle	Member of the New Jersey General Assembly for the 10th District; January 10, 2012 – present With: Virginia E. Haines, James W. Holzapfel, Gregory P. McGuckin	Succeeded by Incumbent
