= Warren Wolf (American football) =

American football coach and politician (1927–2019)

Warren H. Wolf

Member of the New Jersey General Assembly from the 10th district
- In office January 12, 1982 – January 12, 1984 Serving with John Paul Doyle
- Preceded by: Anthony M. Villane; William F. Dowd
- Succeeded by: Marlene Lynch Ford

Personal details
- Born: August 1, 1927 Jersey City, New Jersey, U.S.
- Died: November 22, 2019 (aged 92) Neptune Township, New Jersey, U.S.
- Party: Republican
- Spouse: Peggy Wolf
- Occupation: Football coach

Warren H. Wolf (August 1, 1927 – November 22, 2019) was an American high school football head coach who coached at Brick Township High School in Brick Township, New Jersey. He was also a Republican politician who served as a Brick Township school board member, councilman, mayor, Ocean County freeholder, and New Jersey State Assemblyman.

== Early life ==
Wolf was born in Jersey City and grew up in West New York. While attending Memorial High School, he played on the school's football team. He served in the United States Navy in 1945 and 1946. Following his military service, he graduated from Seton Hall University in 1949 and received an M.A. degree from Columbia University in 1952.

== Football coaching career ==
Wolf's football career began in the 1940s coaching a semi-professional football team in West New York before moving to Memorial High School where he was an assistant coach for 10 years. With the upcoming birth of his second child, in 1958 Wolf moved to Brick Township where he began coaching their high school's fledgling football program, the Brick Green Dragons.

As head coach of the Green Dragons, Wolf achieved a career record of 361-122-11. Wolf has the most wins of any coach in the history of public high school football in New Jersey. Former coach Vic Paternostro of Pope John, a private school, became the state's all-time winningest coach in 2009 when he passed Wolf and retired with 373 wins. As of the start of the 2006 football season, Wolf ranked fourth in the nation of coaches by number of seasons coached and holds the New Jersey record for most years as a football coach.

Wolf began his coaching career in 1958 and had just three losing seasons. In his 51 seasons at Brick, he had won or shared 24 Shore Conference divisional championships as well 13 state sectional titles (seven of which were awarded before playoffs were instituted).

On December 1, 2008, after 51 seasons, Wolf officially retired as the head coach of the Brick Township High School Football Dragons.

On January 25, 2010, after one year away from coaching, Wolf was named head coach of Lakewood High School. Wolf was looking to resurrect what had been one of the worst teams in the Shore Conference for the last decade. Lakewood sits just to the west of Brick, and the two high schools are a few miles apart. The schools used to share a healthy football rivalry, but haven't played each other since Brick defeated Lakewood 65–6 in 2003. ESPN followed Wolf's one-year journey as Lakewood's head coach in a documentary series.

== Government ==
Wolf has also been involved in local and state government, serving as the Mayor of Brick Township from 1971 to 1975, a member of the Ocean County Board of Chosen Freeholders from 1975 to 1981, a member of the New Jersey General Assembly from 1981 to 1983 from the 10th legislative district, a Brick Township Council member from 1982 to 1993, and a member of the Board of Education of the Brick Public Schools for one year in 2010.

== Legacy ==
In 2019, he was voted by NJO as the 18th greatest coach in New Jersey history.

In 2008, Wolf was elected to the New Jersey Sports Writers Association (NJSWA) Hall of Fame.

Wolf died on November 22, 2019, at the Jersey Shore University Medical Center in Neptune Township at the age of 92. Only one month after his death, his beloved wife Peggy died at the age of 89.
