= Gregory P. McGuckin =

American politician (born 1961)

Greg McGuckin

Member of the New Jersey General Assembly from the 10th district
- Incumbent
- Assumed office January 10, 2012 Serving with John Catalano (2012-2020); David W. Wolfe (2020-2024); Paul Kanitra (2024-present)
- Preceded by: James W. Holzapfel

Personal details
- Born: July 2, 1961 (age 65) East Orange, New Jersey, U.S.
- Party: Republican
- Education: B.A. Providence College; J.D. Seton Hall University School of Law
- Occupation: Attorney
- Website: Legislative web page

Gregory P. McGuckin (born July 2, 1961) is an American lawyer and Republican Party politician who has served in the New Jersey General Assembly, representing the 10th Legislative District since January 10, 2012.

== Early life ==
McGuckin was born in East Orange, New Jersey, and raised in Brick Township, where his father John McGuckin was the town's first directly elected mayor. He earned a B.A. degree from Providence College in 1983 and a J.D. degree from Seton Hall University School of Law in 1987 (New Jersey Governor Chris Christie graduated the same year). He interned for U.S. District Court judge John W. Bissell in 1986 and clerked for Judges of the New Jersey Superior Court in Ocean County in 1987–1988. He became an associate with the Forked River law firm Dasti, Murphy & Wellerson, and was named a partner in the firm, now known as Dasti, Murphy, McGuckin, Ulaky, Cherkos & Connors. McGuckin was elected to the Toms River Township Council in 2003 and was re-elected in 2005 and 2009. He was selected as Council President, serving from 2004 to 2011.

In 2008, McGuckin launched a bid to run for Toms River Township council. He suspended his political campaign after it was reported that he had more than $120,000 in federal leins placed against him by the IRS for failure to pay taxes.

== New Jersey Assembly ==
In 2011, incumbent Assemblyman James W. Holzapfel ran for the New Jersey Senate seat of the retiring Andrew R. Ciesla. McGuckin took this opportunity to run for the open Assembly seat. He and his running mate David W. Wolfe defeated the Democratic candidates Bette Wary and Eli Eytan, and he was sworn in on January 10, 2012.

=== Committees ===
- Homeland Security and State Preparedness
- Transportation and Independent Authorities

=== District 10 ===
Each of the 40 districts in the New Jersey Legislature has one representative in the New Jersey Senate and two members in the New Jersey General Assembly. The representatives from the 9th District for the 2024—2025 Legislative Session are:

- Senator James W. Holzapfel (R)
- Assemblyman Paul Kanitra (R)
- Assemblyman Gregory P. McGuckin (R)

== Government legal work ==
In 2020, McGuckin was appointed the Director of Public Law for the Township of Toms River. Toms River Councilman Daniel Rodrick filed a lawsuit against McGuckin claiming he was illegally hired for the job. The lawsuit was dismissed with prejudice by the Assignment Judge of the New Jersey Superior Court's Ocean County division due to Rodrick's complaint having no merit.

== Electoral history ==
=== Assembly ===
10th Legislative District General Election, 2023
Party	Candidate	Votes	%
Republican	Gregory P. McGuckin (incumbent)	34,805	33.0
Republican	Paul Kanitra	34,098	32.4
Democratic	Emma Mammano	18,529	17.6
Democratic	John LaMacchia	17,958	17.0
Total votes		105,390	100.0
Republican hold			
Republican hold			

10th legislative district general election, 2021
Party	Candidate	Votes	%
Republican	Gregory P. McGuckin (incumbent)	55,871	34.61%
Republican	John Catalano (incumbent)	55,463	34.36%
Democratic	Mary "Sharon" Quilter	25,115	15.56%
Democratic	Garrit "Tony" Kono	24,986	15.48%
Total votes		161,435	100.0
Republican hold			

10th Legislative District General Election, 2019
Party	Candidate	Votes	%
Republican	Gregory McGuckin (incumbent)	31,212	31.48%
Republican	John Catalano	30,345	30.6%
Democratic	Eileen Della Volle	18,224	18.38%
Democratic	Erin Wheeler	17,899	18.05%
Integrity Experience Leadership	Vincent Barrella	818	0.83%
Addressing Systemic Issues	Ian Holmes	653	0.66%
Total votes		99,151	100%
Republican hold			

New Jersey general election, 2017
Party	Candidate	Votes	%	±%
Republican	Dave Wolfe	39,265	31.7	▼0.2
Republican	Gregory P. McGuckin	37,896	30.6	▲0.6
Democratic	Michael B. Cooke	23,417	18.9	▼0.9
Democratic	Raymond Baker	23,174	18.7	▲0.2
Total votes		'123,752'	'100.0'	

New Jersey general election, 2015
Party	Candidate	Votes	%	±%
Republican	Dave Wolfe	19,882	31.9	▼3.1
Republican	Gregory P. McGuckin	18,543	30.0	▼3.4
Democratic	Kimberley S. Casten	12,302	19.8	▲3.6
Democratic	Valter Must	11,513	18.5	▲3.1
Total votes		'62,240'	'100.0'	

New Jersey general election, 2013
Party	Candidate	Votes	%	±%
Republican	Dave Wolfe	44,627	35.0	▲3.0
Republican	Gregory P. McGuckin	42,586	33.4	▲2.7
Democratic	Susan Kane	20,647	16.2	▼3.1
Democratic	Amber Gesslein	19,658	15.4	▼2.6
Total votes		'127,518'	'100.0'	

New Jersey general election, 2011
Party	Candidate	Votes	%
Republican	Dave Wolfe	27,955	32.0
Republican	Gregory P. McGuckin	26,831	30.7
Democratic	Bette Wary	16,909	19.3
Democratic	Eli L. Eytan	15,698	18.0
Total votes		87,393	100.0

New Jersey General Assembly
Preceded by James W. Holzapfel	Member of the New Jersey General Assembly for the 10th District; January 10, 2012 – present With: David W. Wolfe	Succeeded by Incumbent
