= Marlene Lynch Ford =

American Democratic Party politician (born 1954)

Member of the New Jersey General Assembly from the 10th district
- In office January 10, 1984 – January 7, 1986 Serving with John Paul Doyle
- Preceded by: Warren Wolf
- Succeeded by: Robert Singer
- In office January 9, 1990 – January 7, 1992 Serving with John Paul Doyle
- Preceded by: Robert Singer
- Succeeded by: Virginia E. Haines and David W. Wolfe

Personal details
- Born: February 23, 1954 (age 72) Yuma, Arizona
- Party: Democratic
- Spouse: William J. Ford (1974-1989) Francis J. Kelly (1998-present)
- Children: MaryJo Lin Kelly
- Education: Georgian Court College (1976); Seton Hall University Law School (1979)
- Occupation: Attorney / Judge

Marlene Lynch Ford (born February 23, 1954) is an American Democratic Party politician, prosecutor and jurist who served in the New Jersey General Assembly.

Born Marlene Lynch in Yuma, Arizona on February 23, 1954, she attended St. Rose High School in Belmar, New Jersey. She graduated in 1976 from Georgian Court College with a bachelor's degree in history and was awarded a J.D. degree from Seton Hall University Law School in 1979. She married William J. Ford in 1974. Divorced in 1989. Married Francis J Kelly MD in 1998

A resident of Point Pleasant, she was elected to the State Assembly in 1983, defeating freshman Republican Assemblyman Warren Wolf. She was the youngest woman at 29 to be elected to the General Assembly. She was defeated for re-election in 1985 by Republican Robert Singer, but regained her seat in a 1989 rematch with Singer. She lost her seat again in the 1991 Republican landslide.

In August 1985, Governor of New Jersey Thomas Kean signed into law a bill sponsored by Ford that allowed residents to deduct property taxes paid from their income tax gross income calculation, resulting in cuts of $60 to $140 on their state taxes. It was at the time the largest tax cut in New Jersey history.

In 1992 she was appointed to the Superior Court by Governor James Florio and reappointed with tenure in 1999. Governor Jon Corzine appointed Ford to serve as Ocean County Prosecutor in 2007 and Governor Chris Christie appointed her to serve as a judge on the New Jersey Superior Court in 2013. A resident of Toms River, she was elevated to Assignment Judge (Chief Judge) of Ocean County in 2015.
