= 1984 United States House of Representatives elections in New Jersey =

- November 6, 1984

All 14 New Jersey seats to the United States House of Representatives
- Turnout: 79% (▲17pp)
	Majority party	Minority party
Party	Democratic	Republican
Last election	9	5
Seats won	8	6
Seat change	▼1	▲1
Popular vote	1,508,320	1,470,836
Percentage	50.4%	49.2%
Swing	▼5.8%	▲6.5%

Democratic
50–60%
60–70%
70–80%
80–90%
Republican
50–60%
60–70%
70–80%

The 1984 United States House of Representatives elections in New Jersey were held on November 6, 1984, to determine who would represent the people of New Jersey in the United States House of Representatives. This election coincided with national elections for President of the United States, U.S. House and U.S. Senate. New Jersey had fourteen seats in the House, apportioned according to the 1980 United States census. Representatives are elected for two-year terms.

== Overview ==
1984 United States House of Representatives elections in New Jersey
Party	Votes	Percentage	Candidates	Seats	+/–
Democratic	1,508,320	50.42%	14	8	▼1
Republican	1,470,836	49.16%	14	6	▲2
Libertarian	6,524	0.22%	5	0	Steady
Socialist Labor	524	0.02%	1	0	Steady
Independents	5,454	0.18%	4	0	Steady
Totals	2,991,658	100.00%	38	14	Steady

== Redistricting ==
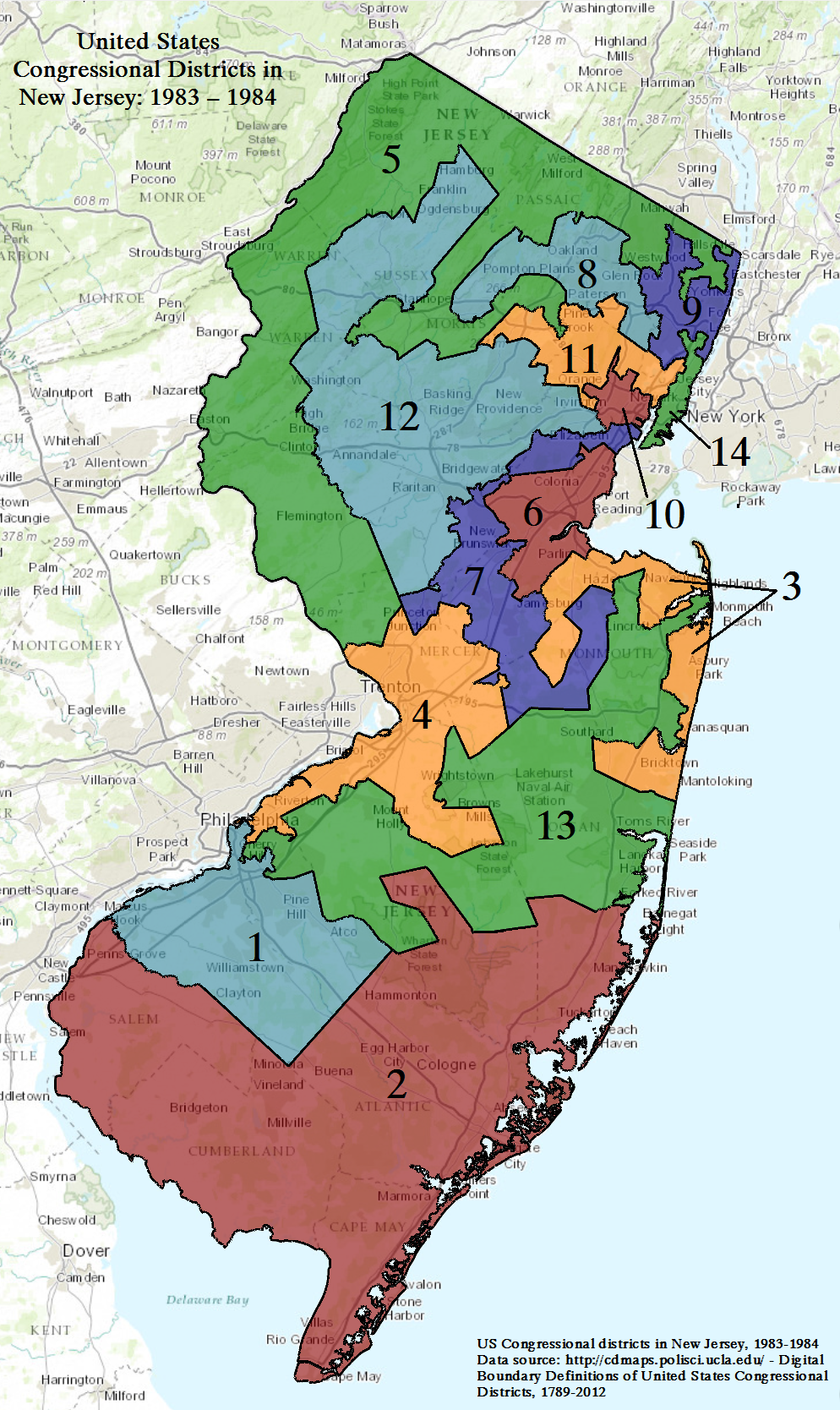
1983–84

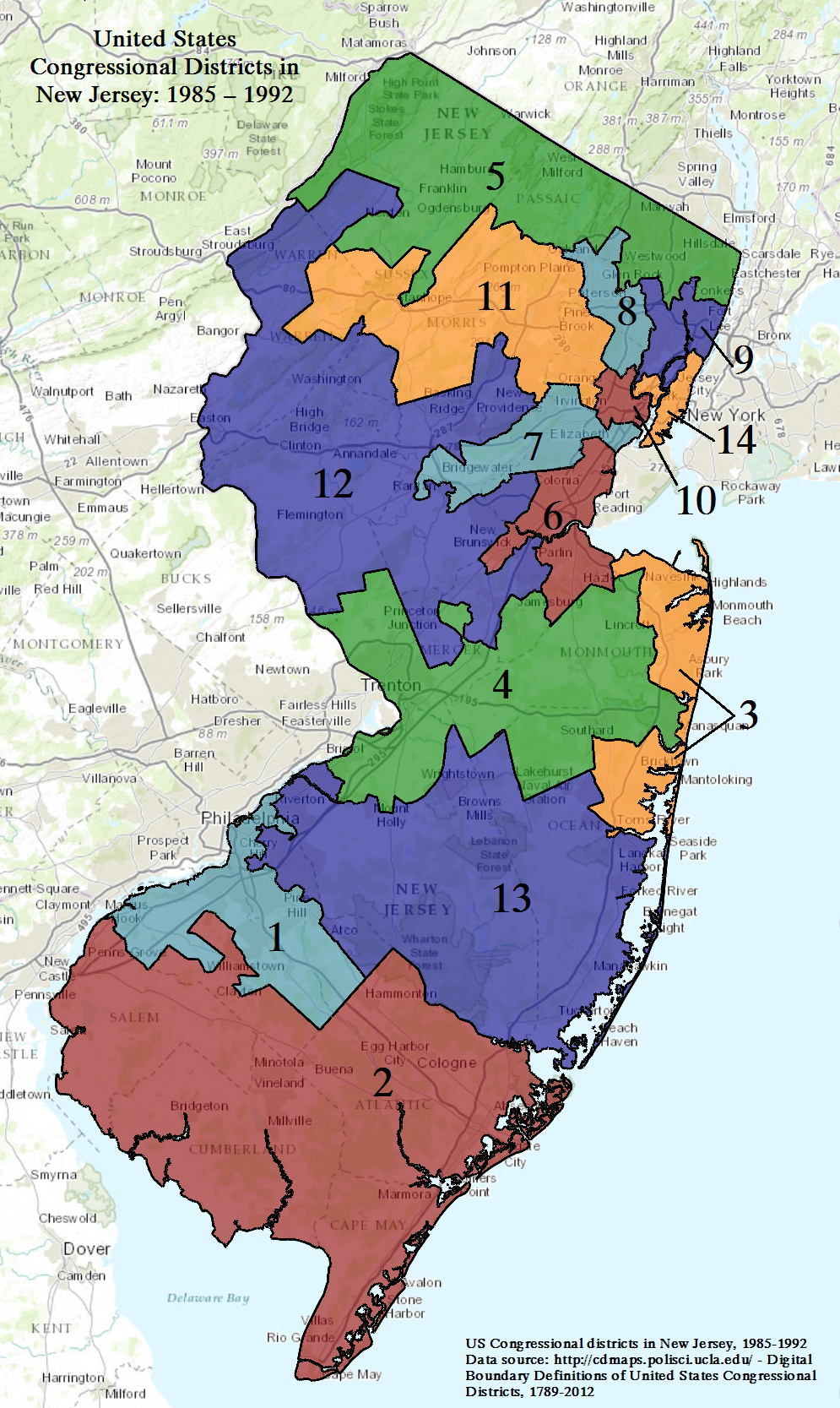
1985–1992

New Jersey congressional districts before (left) and after (right) the Karcher v. Daggett decision and court-ordered redistricting

Following the 1980 United States census, the New Jersey Legislature had conducted decennial redistricting. The resulting map, which was considered heavily favorable to the Democratic Party and approved by Democratic governor Brendan Byrne, was used for the 1982 elections. However, Republicans challenged the map under the "equal representation" clause of Article One, Section 2 of the United States Constitution. In Karcher v. Daggett, 462 U.S. 725 (1983), the Supreme Court of the United States (in an opinion written by former New Jersey judge William J. Brennan Jr.) ruled that the 1982 map violated the equal representation clause because its districts were not drawn to achieve as close to population equality as practicable. The Court ruled that all deviations, no matter how minimal, must be justified by a legitimate government interest. New Jersey was given a deadline of February 3, 1984 to draw a new U.S. Supreme Court-approved map for the 1984 House elections.

Efforts to redraw the map pitted Governor Thomas Kean, a Republican, against the Democratic legislative majority. The initial replacement map, which passed the Assembly on January 6 and had a population variance of 0.06 percent, was advocated by Newark assemblyman Willie B. Brown as protecting the black-majority tenth district, while Republican counterproposals reduced the population variance further at the expense of the state's lone majority-minority district. Brown cited the Court's position that preserving minority voting strength "was a legitimate justification for including population deviations in redistricting plans."

However, Kean vetoed the legislature's map, arguing that it was designed to preserve Democratic chances in the upcoming election, and no compromise was reached ahead of the February 3 deadline. As a result, a three-judge federal court panel (John Joseph Gibbons, Clarkson Sherman Fisher and Stanley Brotman) considered five proposals, including the vetoed legislative map. The panel selected a map proposed by four of the five incumbent Republican U.S. representatives, citing its low population differences and compact districts. Only twenty-five people separated the most and least populous districts, and the majority-black tenth district was preserved. Kean said the result was not "an ideal solution" and called for a bipartisan or nonpartisan commission for future redistricting, which was eventually established by constitutional amendment in November 1995.

The most significant political change on the map in 1984 was in the eleventh district, represented by Democratic incumbent Joseph Minish since 1963. The new map removed several strongly Democratic urban areas in Bergen, Hudson, and Passaic counties and added suburban and rural areas in Morris, Sussex, and Warren, favoring Republicans. As a result, Minish was expected to draw a significant challenge in the 1984 elections.

== District 1 ==
1984 New Jersey's 1st congressional district election
- November 6, 1984
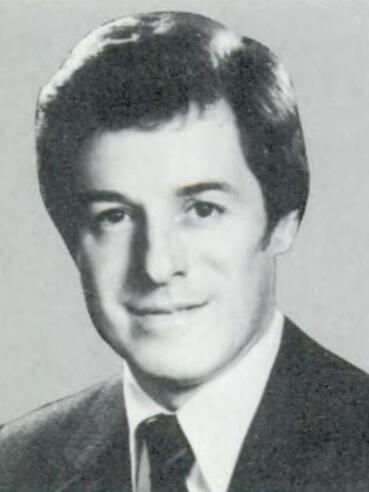

Nominee	James Florio	Fred Busch
Party	Democratic	Republican
Popular vote	152,125	58,800
Percentage	71.9%	27.8%
U.S. Representative before election
James Florio
Democratic
Elected U.S. Representative
James Florio
Democratic

Incumbent Democrat James Florio won. The district included parts of Burlington, Camden, and Gloucester counties.

=== Democratic primary ===
==== Candidates ====
- James Florio, incumbent Representative since 1975
- Patrick A. Miller, supporter of Lyndon LaRouche

==== Results ====
1984 Democratic primary
Party	Candidate	Votes	%
Democratic	James Florio (incumbent)	42,509	93.42%
Democratic	Patrick A. Miller	2,992	6.58%
Total votes		45,501	100.00%

=== Republican primary ===
==== Candidates ====
- Fred A. Busch, chemical sales representative and former member of the Camden County Republican Committee

==== Results ====
1984 Republican primary
Party	Candidate	Votes	%
Republican	Fred A. Busch	11,111	100.00%
Total votes		11,111	100.00%

=== General election ===
==== Candidates ====
- Fred A. Busch, chemical sales representative and former member of the Camden County Republican Committee (Republican)
- James Florio, incumbent Representative since 1975 (Republican)
- Jerry Zeldin (Libertarian)

==== Results ====
1984 U.S. House election
Party	Candidate	Votes	%	±%
Democratic	James Florio (incumbent)	152,125	71.86%	
Republican	Fred A. Busch	58,800	27.77%	
Libertarian	Jerry Zeldin	786	0.37%	
Total votes		211,711	100.00%	
Democratic hold		Swing	{{{swing}}}	

== District 2 ==
1984 New Jersey's 2nd congressional district election
- November 6, 1984
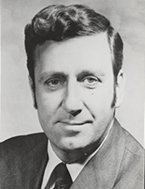

Nominee	William J. Hughes	Raymond Massie
Party	Democratic	Republican
Popular vote	132,841	77,231
Percentage	63.4%	36.6%
U.S. Representative before election
William J. Hughes
Democratic
Elected U.S. Representative
William J. Hughes
Democratic

Incumbent William J. Hughes won. This district, the largest in South Jersey, included all of Atlantic, Cape May, Cumberland, and Salem counties and parts of Gloucester County.

=== Democratic primary ===
==== Candidates ====
- William J. Hughes, incumbent Representative since 1975

==== Results ====
1984 Democratic primary
Party	Candidate	Votes	%
Democratic	William J. Hughes (incumbent)	25,023	100.00%
Total votes		25,023	100.00%

=== Republican primary ===
==== Candidates ====
- Raymond G. Massie, Stockton State College professor of business law

==== Results ====
1984 Republican primary
Party	Candidate	Votes	%
Republican	Raymond G. Massie	19,293	100.00%
Total votes		19,293	100.00%

=== General election ===
==== Candidates ====
- Raymond G. Massie, Stockton State College professor of business law (Republican)
- William J. Hughes, incumbent Representative since 1975 (Democratic)

==== Results ====
1984 U.S. House election
Party	Candidate	Votes	%	±%
Democratic	William J. Hughes (incumbent)	132,841	63.41%	
Republican	Raymond G. Massie	77,231	36.59%	
Total votes		211,072	100.00%	
Democratic hold		Swing	{{{swing}}}	

== District 3 ==
1984 New Jersey's 3rd congressional district election
- November 6, 1984
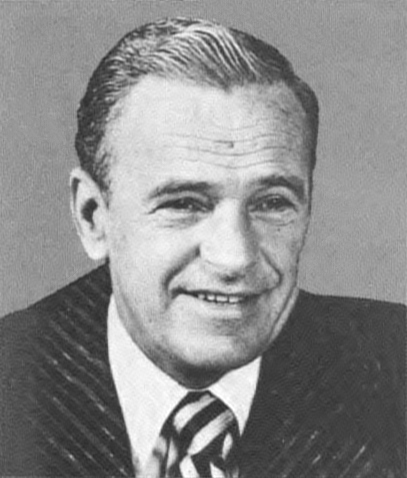

Nominee	James J. Howard	Brian T. Kennedy
Party	Democratic	Republican
Popular vote	122,291	105,028
Percentage	53.3%	45.8%
U.S. Representative before election
James J. Howard
Democratic
Elected U.S. Representative
James J. Howard
Democratic

Incumbent Democrat James J. Howard won.

This district included parts of Monmouth and Ocean counties.

=== Democratic primary ===
==== Candidates ====
- Dorothy J. Eaton, supporter of Lyndon LaRouche
- James J. Howard, incumbent Representative since 1965

==== Results ====
1984 Democratic primary
Party	Candidate	Votes	%
Democratic	James J. Howard (incumbent)	23,278	90.60%
Democratic	Dorothy J. Eaton	2,315	9.40%
Total votes		25,693	100.00%

=== Republican primary ===
==== Candidates ====
- Brian T. Kennedy, former state senator from Sea Girt

==== Results ====
1984 Republican primary
Party	Candidate	Votes	%
Republican	Brian T. Kennedy	15,737	100.00%
Total votes		15,737	100.00%

=== General election ===
==== Candidates ====
- Lawrence D. Erickson (Citizens-Socialist)
- James J. Howard, incumbent Representative since 1965 (Democratic)
- Brian T. Kennedy, former state senator from Sea Girt (Republican)
- Frank Krushinski Jr. (Christian American)

==== Results ====
1984 U.S. House election
Party	Candidate	Votes	%	±%
Democratic	James J. Howard (incumbent)	122,291	53.30%	
Republican	Brian T. Kennedy	105,028	45.78%	
Independent	Frank Krushinski Jr.	1,196	0.52%	
Independent	Lawrence D. Erickson	907	0.40%	
Total votes		229,422	100.00%	
Democratic hold		Swing	{{{swing}}}	

== District 4 ==
1984 New Jersey's 4th congressional district election
- November 6, 1984
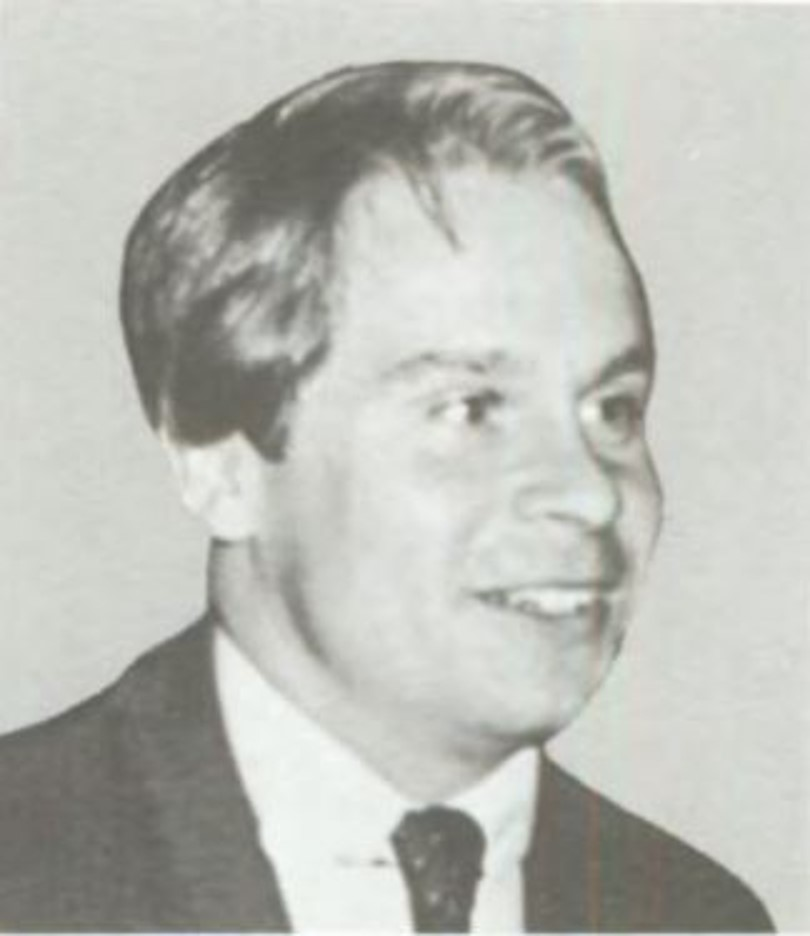

Nominee	Chris Smith	James Hedden
Party	Republican	Democratic
Popular vote	139,295	87,908
Percentage	61.3%	38.7%
U.S. Representative before election
Chris Smith
Republican
Elected U.S. Representative
Chris Smith
Republican

Incumbent Republican Chris Smith won. This district, in Central Jersey, consisted of parts of Burlington, Mercer, Middlesex, Monmouth and Ocean counties.

=== Republican primary ===
==== Candidates ====
- Chris Smith, incumbent Representative since 1981

==== Results ====
1984 Republican primary
Party	Candidate	Votes	%
Republican	Chris Smith (incumbent)	13,049	100.00%
Total votes		13,049	100.00%

=== Democratic primary ===
==== Candidates ====
- James C. Hedden, political director for the American Federation of State, County and Municipal Employees and former Mercer County freeholder
- Jeffrey Laurenti, former executive director of the New Jersey Senate Democratic majority
- Janet C. Sare, supporter of Lyndon LaRouche

==== Results ====
1984 Democratic primary
Party	Candidate	Votes	%
Democratic	James C. Hedden	20,640	53.07%
Democratic	Jeffrey Laurenti	15,823	40.68%
Democratic	Janet C. Sare	2,430	6.25%
Total votes		38,893	100.00%

=== General election ===
==== Candidates ====
- James C. Hedden, political director for the American Federation of State, County and Municipal Employees (Democratic)
- Chris Smith, incumbent Representative since 1981 (Republican)

==== Results ====
1984 U.S. House election
Party	Candidate	Votes	%	±%
Republican	Chris Smith (incumbent)	139,295	61.31%	
Democratic	James C. Hedden	87,908	38.69%	
Total votes		227,203	100.00%	
Turnout		132,360	45.35%	
Republican hold		Swing	{{{swing}}}	

== District 5 ==
1984 New Jersey's 5th congressional district election
- November 6, 1984
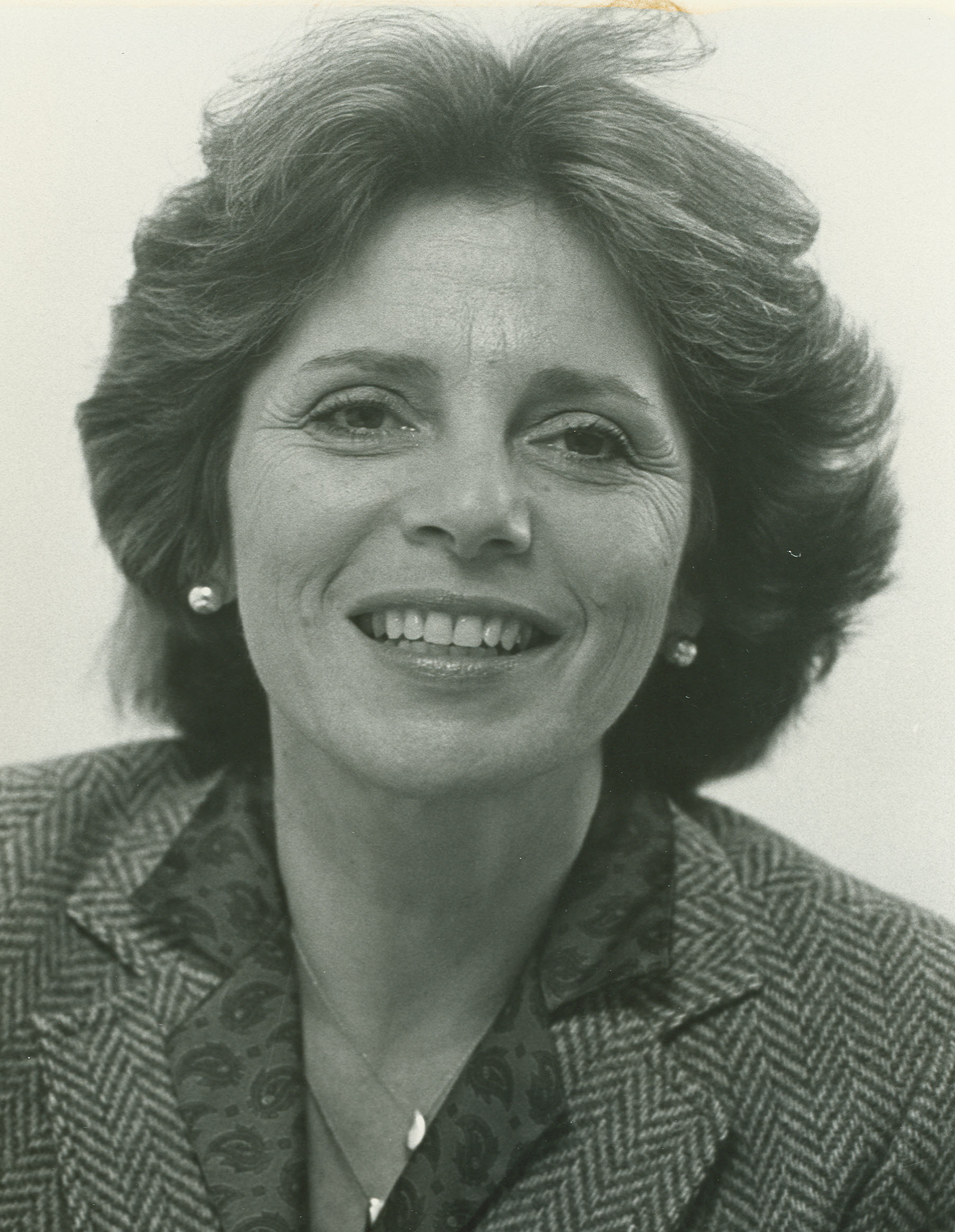

Nominee	Marge Roukema	Rose Brunetto
Party	Republican	Democratic
Popular vote	171,979	69,666
Percentage	71.2%	28.8%
U.S. Representative before election
Marge Roukema
Republican
Elected U.S. Representative
Marge Roukema
Republican

Incumbent Marge Roukema won. This district included parts of Bergen, Passaic, and Sussex counties.

=== Republican primary ===
==== Candidates ====
- Marge Roukema, incumbent Representative from Ridgewood since 1981

==== Results ====
1984 Republican primary
Party	Candidate	Votes	%
Republican	Marge Roukema (incumbent)	19,799	100.00%
Total votes		19,799	100.00%

=== Democratic primary ===
==== Candidates ====
- Rose Brunetto, former aide to U.S. senator Bill Bradley
- John P. Kilroy Jr., supporter of Lyndon LaRouche
- Mark Rohrlich, former newspaper reporter

==== Results ====
1984 Democratic primary
Party	Candidate	Votes	%
Democratic	Rose Brunetto	18,951	83.56%
Democratic	John P. Kilroy Jr.	1,974	8.70%
Democratic	Mark Rohrlich	1,755	7.74%
Total votes		22,680	100.00%

=== General election ===
==== Candidates ====
- Rose Brunetto, former aide to U.S. senator Bill Bradley (Democratic)
- Marge Roukema, incumbent Representative from Ridgewood since 1981 (Republican)

==== Results ====
1984 U.S. House election
Party	Candidate	Votes	%	±%
Republican	Marge Roukema (incumbent)	171,979	71.17%	
Democratic	Rose Brunetto	69,666	28.83%	
Total votes		241,645	100.00%	
Turnout		134,220	46.32%	
Republican hold		Swing	{{{swing}}}	

== District 6 ==
1984 New Jersey's 6th congressional district election
- November 6, 1984
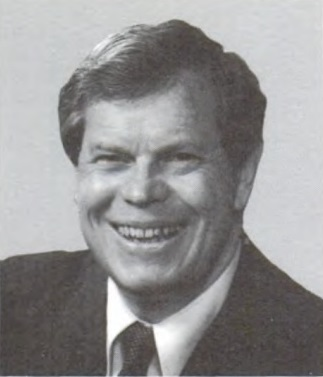

Nominee	Bernard J. Dwyer	Dennis Adams
Party	Democratic	Republican
Popular vote	118,532	90,862
Percentage	55.9%	42.8%
U.S. Representative before election
Bernard J. Dwyer
Democratic
Elected U.S. Representative
Bernard J. Dwyer
Democratic

Incumbent Democrat Bernard J. Dwyer won. This district included parts of Middlesex, Monmouth and Union counties.

=== Democratic primary ===
==== Candidates ====
- Bernard J. Dwyer, incumbent Representative from Edison since 1981
- Alex Plechocki, supporter of Lyndon LaRouche

==== Results ====
1984 Democratic primary
Party	Candidate	Votes	%
Democratic	Bernard J. Dwyer (incumbent)	27,414	86.38%
Democratic	Alex Plechocki	4,323	13.32%
Total votes		31,737	100.00%

=== Republican primary ===
==== Candidates ====
- Dennis Adams, retired car dealer

==== Results ====
1984 Republican primary
Party	Candidate	Votes	%
Republican	Dennis Adams	5,785	100.00%
Total votes		5,785	100.00%

=== General election ===
==== Candidates ====
- Dennis Adams, retired car dealer (Republican)
- Bernard J. Dwyer, incumbent Representative from Edison since 1981 (Democratic)
- Stephen Friedlander (Libertarian)

==== Results ====
1984 U.S. House election
Party	Candidate	Votes	%	±%
Democratic	Bernard J. Dwyer (incumbent)	118,532	55.89%	
Republican	Dennis Adams	90,862	42.84%	
Libertarian	Stephen Friedlander	2,686	1.27%	
Total votes		212,080	100.00%	
Turnout		103,110	37.54%	
Democratic hold		Swing	{{{swing}}}	

== District 7 ==
1984 New Jersey's 7th congressional district election
- November 6, 1984
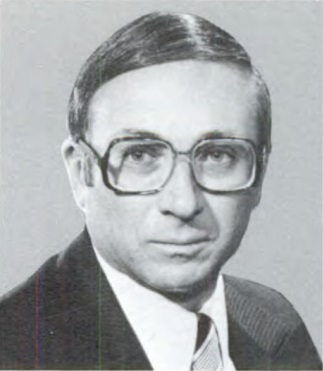

Nominee	Matt Rinaldo	John Feeley
Party	Republican	Democratic
Popular vote	165,685	56,798
Percentage	74.2%	25.4%
U.S. Representative before election
Matt Rinaldo
Republican
Elected U.S. Representative
Matt Rinaldo
Republican

Incumbent Matt Rinaldo won. This district included parts of Essex, Middlesex, Somerset, and Union counties.

=== Republican primary ===
==== Candidates ====
- Matt Rinaldo, incumbent Representative from Union since 1973

==== Results ====
1984 Republican primary
Party	Candidate	Votes	%
Republican	Matt Rinaldo (incumbent)	19,847	100.00%
Total votes		19,847	100.00%

=== Democratic primary ===
==== Candidates ====
- James J. Cleary, supporter of Lyndon LaRouche
- John F. Feeley, data processing consultant
- Dwight Gatling

==== Results ====
1984 Democratic primary
Party	Candidate	Votes	%
Democratic	John F. Feeley	14,317	63.01%
Democratic	Dwight Gatlino	4,911	21.61%
Democratic	James J. Cleary	3,493	15.37%
Total votes		22,721	100.00%

=== General election ===
==== Candidates ====
- John F. Feeley, data processing consultant (Democratic)
- Paul Nelson (Libertarian)
- Matt Rinaldo, incumbent Representative from Union since 1973 (Republican)

==== Results ====
1984 U.S. House election
Party	Candidate	Votes	%	±%
Republican	Matt Rinaldo (incumbent)	165,685	74.20%	
Democratic	John F. Feeley	56,798	25.44%	
Libertarian	Paul Nelson	799	0.36%	
Total votes		223,282	100.00%	
Republican hold		Swing	{{{swing}}}	

== District 8 ==
1984 New Jersey's 8th congressional district election
- November 6, 1984
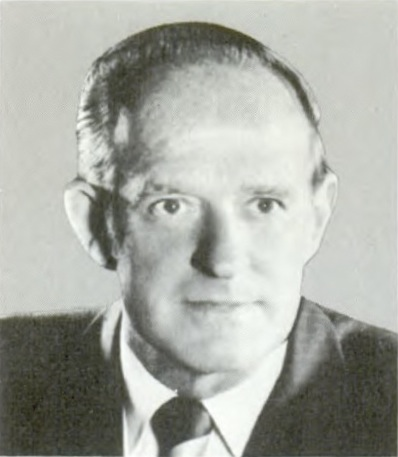

Nominee	Robert A. Roe	Marguerite Page
Party	Democratic	Republican
Popular vote	118,793	69,973
Percentage	62.7%	36.9%
U.S. Representative before election
Robert A. Roe
Democratic
Elected U.S. Representative
Robert A. Roe
Democratic

Incumbent Robert Roe won. This district included parts of Bergen, Essex, Morris and Passaic counties.

=== Democratic primary ===
==== Candidates ====
- Robert A. Roe, incumbent Representative from Wayne since 1969 and candidate for governor in 1977 and 1981
- Ronald H. Taylor, supporter of Lyndon LaRouche

==== Results ====
1984 Democratic primary
Party	Candidate	Votes	%
Democratic	Robert A. Roe (incumbent)	30,352	95.76%
Democratic	Ronald H. Taylor	3,794	4.24%
Total votes		34,046	100.00%

=== Republican primary ===
==== Candidates ====
- William R. Cleveland, Clifton advertising executive
- Marguerite A. Page, Newark schoolteacher

===== Withdrew =====
- James Irvin Glover

==== Endorsements ====
William R. Cleveland

Party officials

- Rocco Motta, chair of the Passaic County Republican Party
Marguerite A. Page

State legislators

- Joseph Bubba, state senator from Wayne and former chair of the Passaic County Republican Party

==== Results ====
1984 Republican primary
Party	Candidate	Votes	%
Republican	Marguerite A. Page	12,167	83.47%
Republican	William R. Cleveland	2,409	16.53%
Total votes		14,576	100.00%

=== General election ===
==== Candidates ====
- Daniel A. Maiullo Jr. (Libertarian)
- Marguerite A. Page, Newark schoolteacher (Republican)
- Robert A. Roe, incumbent Representative from Wayne since 1969 (Democratic)

==== Results ====
1984 U.S. House election
Party	Candidate	Votes	%	±%
Democratic	Robert A. Roe (incumbent)	118,793	62.72%	
Republican	Marguerite A. Page	69,973	36.95%	
Libertarian	Daniel A. Maiullo Jr.	629	0.33%	
Total votes		189,395	100.00%	
Democratic hold		Swing	{{{swing}}}	

== District 9 ==
1984 New Jersey's 9th congressional district election
- November 6, 1984
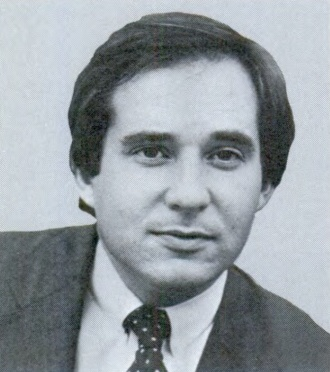

Nominee	Bob Torricelli	Neil Romano
Party	Democratic	Republican
Popular vote	149,493	89,166
Percentage	62.6%	37.4%
U.S. Representative before election
Bob Torricelli
Democratic
Elected U.S. Representative
Bob Torricelli
Democratic

Incumbent Democrat Bob Torricelli won. This district consisted of parts of Bergen and Hudson counties.

=== Democratic primary ===
==== Candidates ====
- John Graverholz, supporter of Lyndon LaRouche
- Bob Torricelli, incumbent Representative from Englewood since 1983

==== Results ====
1984 Democratic primary
Party	Candidate	Votes	%
Democratic	Bob Torricelli (incumbent)	36,937	93.62%
Democratic	John Graverholz	2,519	6.38%
Total votes		39,456	100.00%

=== Republican primary ===
==== Candidates ====
- Neil Romano, former executive director of the Monmouth County Republican Party

==== Results ====
1984 Republican primary
Party	Candidate	Votes	%
Republican	Neil Romano	9,839	100.00%
Total votes		9,839	100.00%

=== General election ===
==== Candidates ====
- Neil Romano, former executive director of the Monmouth County Republican Party (Republican)
- Bob Torricelli, incumbent Representative from Englewood since 1983 (Democratic)

==== Results ====
1984 U.S. House election
Party	Candidate	Votes	%	±%
Democratic	Bob Torricelli (incumbent)	149,493	62.64%	
Republican	Neil Romano	89,166	37.36%	
Total votes		238,659	100.00%	
Democratic hold		Swing	{{{swing}}}	

== District 10 ==
1984 New Jersey's 10th congressional district election
- November 6, 1984
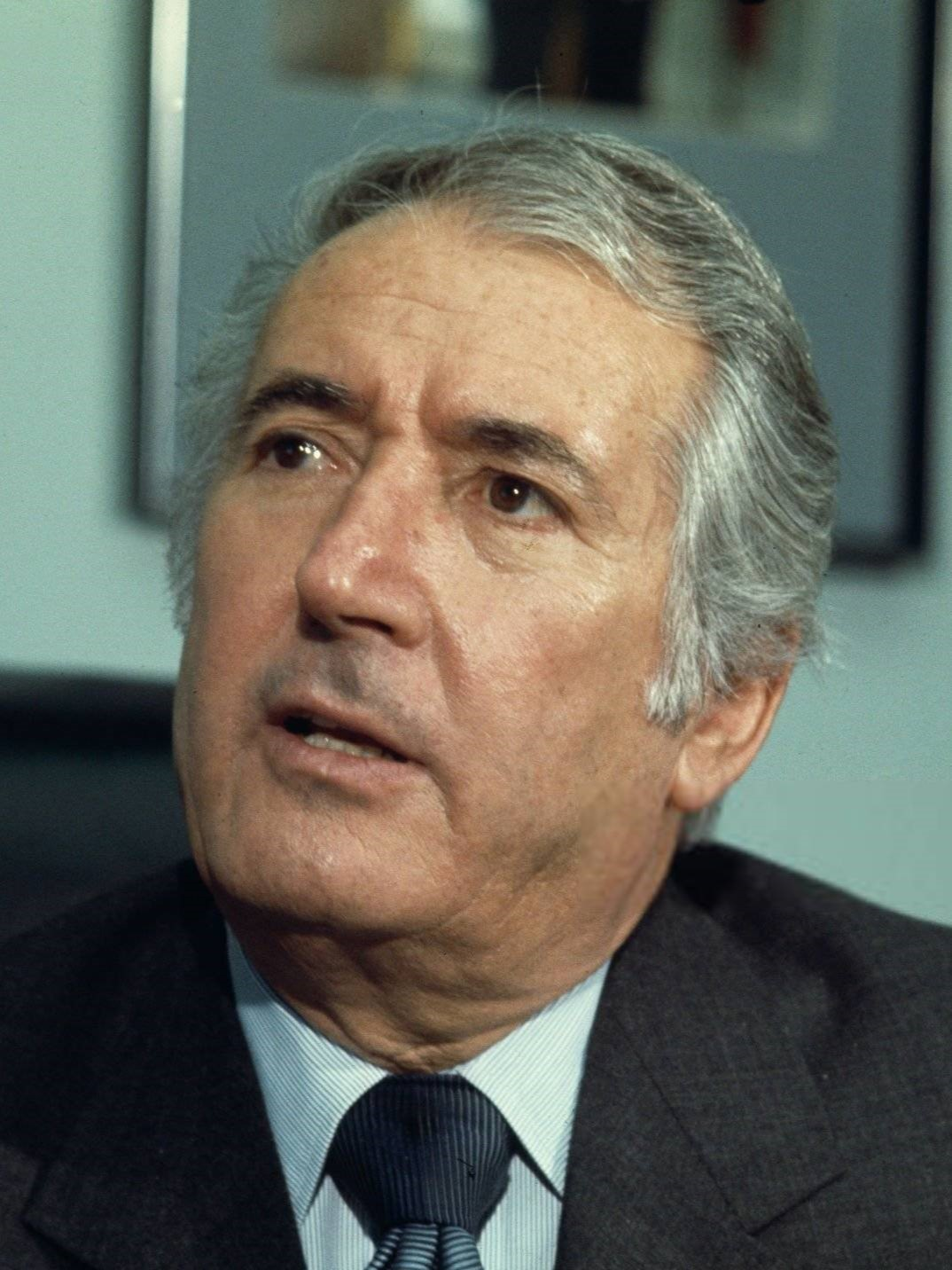

Nominee	Peter W. Rodino	Howard Berkeley
Party	Democratic	Republican
Popular vote	111,244	21,712
Percentage	83.7%	16.3%
U.S. Representative before election
Peter W. Rodino
Democratic
Elected U.S. Representative
Peter W. Rodino
Democratic

Incumbent Democrat Peter W. Rodino won. The district included parts of Essex and Union counties.

=== Democratic primary ===
==== Candidates ====
- Arthur S. Jones, minister of St. Mark's African Methodist Episcopal Church in East Orange
- Peter W. Rodino, incumbent Representative since 1949
- Thelma I. Tyree, supporter of Lyndon LaRouche

==== Results ====
1984 Democratic primary
Party	Candidate	Votes	%
Democratic	Peter W. Rodino (incumbent)	42,109	76.31%
Democratic	Arthur S. Jones	10,294	18.65%
Democratic	Thelma I. Tyree	2,779	5.04%
Total votes		55,182	100.00%

=== Republican primary ===
==== Candidates ====
- Howard E. Berkeley

==== Results ====
1984 Republican primary
Party	Candidate	Votes	%
Republican	Howard E. Berkeley	2,582	100.00%
Total votes		2,582	100.00%

=== General election ===
==== Candidates ====
- Howard E. Berkeley (Republican)
- Peter W. Rodino, incumbent Representative since 1949 (Democratic)

==== Results ====
1984 U.S. House election
Party	Candidate	Votes	%	±%
Democratic	Peter W. Rodino (incumbent)	111,244	83.67%	
Republican	Howard E. Berkeley	21,712	16.33%	
Total votes		132,956	100.00%	
Democratic hold		Swing	{{{swing}}}	

== District 11 ==
1984 New Jersey's 11th congressional district election
- November 6, 1984
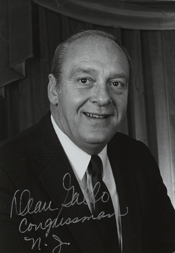

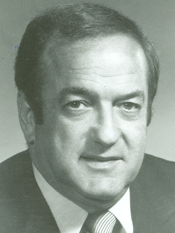
Nominee	Dean Gallo	Joseph Minish
Party	Republican	Democratic
Popular vote	133,662	106,038
Percentage	55.8%	44.2%
U.S. Representative before election
Joseph Minish
Democratic
Elected U.S. Representative
Dean Gallo
Republican

Republican Dean Gallo defeated Democratic incumbent Joseph Minish. This district, which had been significantly revised as the result of Karcher v. Daggett, consisted of parts of Essex, Morris, Sussex and Warren counties.

The Republican Party would continue to hold this seat until 2018.

=== Democratic primary ===
==== Candidates ====
- Mary Frueholz, supporter of Lyndon LaRouche
- Joseph Minish, incumbent Representative from West Orange since 1963

==== Results ====
1984 Democratic primary
Party	Candidate	Votes	%
Democratic	Joseph Minish (incumbent)	25,688	87.68%
Democratic	Mary Frueholz	3,609	12.32%
Total votes		29,297	100.00%

=== Republican primary ===
==== Candidates ====
- Dean Gallo, assemblyman from Parsippany–Troy Hills and assembly minority leader

===== Declined =====
- John H. Dorsey, state senator from Boonton
- Rodney Frelinghuysen, assemblyman from Morristown, candidate for the 12th district in 1982, and son of former Representative Peter Frelinghuysen
- Rey Redington, former president of the Montclair Chamber of Commerce and nominee for this seat in 1982

==== Results ====
1984 Republican primary
Party	Candidate	Votes	%
Republican	Dean Gallo	21,225	100.00%
Total votes		21,225	100.00%

=== General election ===
==== Candidates ====
- Dean Gallo, assemblyman from Parsippany–Troy Hills and assembly minority leader (Republican)
- Joseph Minish, incumbent Representative from West Orange since 1963 (Democratic)

==== Results ====
1984 U.S. House election
Party	Candidate	Votes	%	±%
Republican	Dean Gallo	133,662	55.76%	
Democratic	Joseph Minish (incumbent)	106,038	44.24%	
Total votes		239,700	100.00%	
Republican hold		Swing	{{{swing}}}	

== District 12 ==
1984 New Jersey's 12th congressional district election
- November 6, 1984
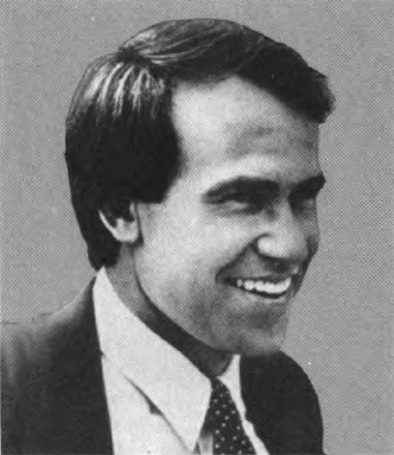

Nominee	Jim Courter	Peter Bearse
Party	Republican	Democratic
Popular vote	148,042	78,167
Percentage	65.0%	34.3%
U.S. Representative before election
Jim Courter
Republican
Elected U.S. Representative
Jim Courter
Republican

Incumbent Republican Jim Courter won. This sprawling district included all of Hunterdon County and parts of Mercer, Middlesex, Morris, Somerset, Sussex, and Warren counties.

=== Republican primary ===
==== Candidates ====
- Jim Courter, incumbent Representative since 1979

==== Results ====
1984 Republican primary
Party	Candidate	Votes	%
Republican	Jim Courter (incumbent)	21,887	100.00%
Total votes		21,887	100.00%

=== Democratic primary ===
==== Candidates ====
- Peter Bearse, economist and member of the Princeton Township Council
- Richard Forbes, supporter of Lyndon LaRouche
- Ray Rollinson, salesman and perennial candidate
- Norman J. Weinstein, former president of the Somerville Borough Council

==== Results ====
1984 Democratic primary
Party	Candidate	Votes	%
Democratic	Peter Bearse	10,477	42.50%
Democratic	Norman J. Weinstein	6,951	28.20%
Democratic	Richard Forbes	3,838	15.57%
Democratic	Ray Rollinson	3,386	13.74%
Total votes		24,652	100.00%

=== General election ===
==== Candidates ====
- Peter Bearse, economist and member of the Princeton Township Council (Democratic)
- Jim Courter, incumbent Representative since 1979 (Republican)
- Joseph R. Kerr III (Libertarian)

==== Results ====
1984 U.S. House election
Party	Candidate	Votes	%	±%
Republican	Jim Courter (incumbent)	148,042	64.98%	
Democratic	Peter Bearse	78,167	34.31%	
Libertarian	Joseph R. Kerr III	1,624	0.71%	
Total votes		227,833	100.00%	
Republican hold		Swing	{{{swing}}}	

== District 13 ==
1984 New Jersey's 13th congressional district election
- November 6, 1984
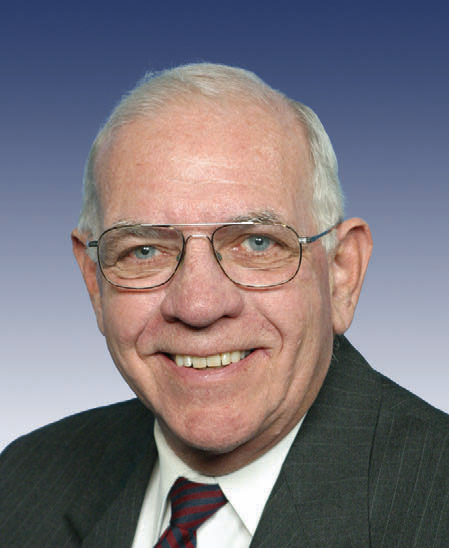

Nominee	Jim Saxton	Jim Smith
Party	Republican	Democratic
Popular vote	141,136	89,307
Percentage	60.7%	38.4%
U.S. Representative before election
Vacant
Elected U.S. Representative
Jim Saxton
Republican

This seat had been vacant since incumbent Republican Edwin Forsythe died on March 29, 1984. Republican Jim Saxton won the open seat, as well as the special election to complete Forsythe's term.

This district included parts of Burlington, Camden, and Ocean counties.

=== Republican primary ===
==== Candidates ====
- M. Dean Haines, Ocean County Clerk and former mayor of Barnegat
- Jim Saxton, state senator from Bordentown Township
- John A. Rocco, assemblyman and former mayor of Cherry Hill

==== Results ====
1984 Republican primary
Party	Candidate	Votes	%
Republican	Jim Saxton (incumbent)	16,143	44.71%
Republican	M. Dean Haines	14,955	41.42%
Republican	John A. Rocco	5,012	13.88%
Total votes		36,110	100.00%

==== Special primary results ====
1984 Republican primary
Party	Candidate	Votes	%
Republican	Jim Saxton (incumbent)	13,877	46.01%
Republican	M. Dean Haines	12,178	40.38%
Republican	John A. Rocco	4,107	13.62%
Total votes		30,162	100.00%

=== Democratic primary ===
==== Candidates ====
- Herbert J. Buehler, former state senator from Point Pleasant Beach
- Eugene Allan Creech, nuclear disarmament advocate
- Michael DiMarco, supporter of Lyndon LaRouche
- James B. Smith, mayor of Mount Holly

==== Results ====
1984 Democratic primary
Party	Candidate	Votes	%
Democratic	James B. Smith	15,557	56.20%
Democratic	Herbert J. Buehler	5,288	19.10%
Democratic	Eugene Creech	3,637	13.14%
Democratic	Michael Di Marco	3,200	11.56%
Total votes		27,682	100.00%

==== Special primary results ====
1984 Democratic primary
Party	Candidate	Votes	%
Democratic	James B. Smith	15,154	64.35%
Democratic	Herbert J. Buehler	8,396	35.65%
Total votes		23,550	100.00%

=== General election ===
==== Candidates ====
- Bernardo Doganiero, perennial candidate (Socialist Labor)
- Jim Saxton, state senator from Bordentown Township (Republican)
- Don Smith (Constitutional Freedom)
- James B. Smith, mayor of Mount Holly (Democratic)

==== Results ====
1984 U.S. House election
Party	Candidate	Votes	%	±%
Republican	Jim Saxton (incumbent)	141,136	60.71%	
Democratic	Jim Smith	89,307	38.41%	
Independent	Don Smith	1,516	0.65%	
Socialist Labor	Bernardo S. Doganiero	524	0.23%	
Total votes		232,483	100.00%	
Republican hold		Swing	{{{swing}}}	

== District 14 ==
1984 New Jersey's 14th congressional district election
- November 6, 1984
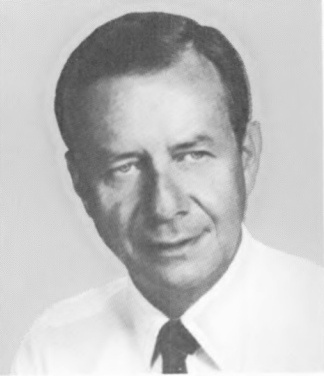

Nominee	Frank Guarini	Edward Magee
Party	Democratic	Republican
Popular vote	115,117	58,265
Percentage	65.7%	33.3%
U.S. Representative before election
Frank J. Guarini
Democratic
Elected U.S. Representative
Frank J. Guarini
Democratic

Incumbent Democrat Frank J. Guarini won. This district included parts Hudson County.

=== Democratic primary ===
==== Candidates ====
- Frank J. Guarini, incumbent Representative since 1979
- Edward Malik, supporter of Lyndon LaRouche
- Anthony Peduto, Jersey City lawyer

==== Endorsements ====
Frank J. Guarini

Local officials

- Gerald McCann, mayor of Jersey City

==== Results ====
1984 Democratic primary
Party	Candidate	Votes	%
Democratic	Frank J. Guarini (incumbent)	50,775	71.65%
Democratic	Anthony P. Peduto	19,856	24.21%
Democratic	Edward Malik	3,398	4.14%
Total votes		82,029	100.00%

=== Republican primary ===
==== Candidates ====
- Edward T. Magee

==== Results ====
1984 Republican primary
Party	Candidate	Votes	%
Republican	Edward T. Magee	5,746	100.00%
Total votes		5,746	100.00%

=== General election ===
==== Candidates ====
- Frank J. Guarini, incumbent Representative since 1979 (Democratic)
- Edward T. Magee (Republican)
- Herbert Shaw, perennial candidate (Politicians are Crooks)

==== Results ====
1984 U.S. House election
Party	Candidate	Votes	%	±%
Democratic	Frank J. Guarini (incumbent)	115,117	65.70%	
Republican	Edward T. Magee	58,265	33.25%	
Independent	Herbert Shaw	1,835	1.05%	
Total votes		175,217	100.00%	
Democratic hold		Swing	{{{swing}}}	
