= Anthony M. Villane =

American dentist and politician (1929–2022)

Anthony M. Villane Jr.

Commissioner of the New Jersey Department of Community Affairs
- In office October 26, 1988 – January 16, 1990; Acting: July 7, 1988 – October 26, 1988
- Governor: Thomas Kean
- Preceded by: Leonard S. Coleman Jr.
- Succeeded by: Randy Primas

Member of the New Jersey General Assembly
- In office January 6, 1976 – July 11, 1988 Serving with Brian T. Kennedy, William F. Dowd, Joseph A. Palaia
- Preceded by: Gertrude Berman
- Succeeded by: John Villapiano
- Constituency: 10th District (1976-1982); 11th District (1982-1988)

Personal details
- Born: December 24, 1929 Newark, New Jersey, U.S.
- Died: June 29, 2022 (aged 92) Long Branch, New Jersey, U.S.
- Party: Republican
- Spouse: Sarah Belverio (m. June 1953)
- Education: Rutgers University; Temple University
- Occupation: Dentist

Anthony M. Villane Jr. (December 24, 1929 – June 29, 2022) was an American dentist and Republican Party politician who was elected to serve seven terms in the New Jersey General Assembly from 1976 to 1988, and served as head of the New Jersey Department of Community Affairs from 1988 to 1990, when he was named as regional administrator of the United States Department of Housing and Urban Development.

== Early life and education ==
Villane was born in Newark, New Jersey, on December 24, 1929. He attended the Newark Public Schools and graduated from Barringer High School. He earned his undergraduate degree from Rutgers University in 1951 and received a degree in dentistry in 1955 from Temple University. He served in the United States Air Force from 1955 to 1958 with the rank of captain, after which he maintained a dental practice in Eatontown.

In 1971, Villane was chosen to chair the Long Branch Republican Party, a position he filled until 1977.

== Career ==
From 1975 to 1977, Villane served as a trustee of the board of education of the Long Branch Public Schools.

A resident of Long Branch, New Jersey, Villane and his Republican running mate Brian Kennedy defeated Democratic incumbent Gertrude Berman and her running mate Richard J. Connors in the November 1975 general election, to win the two Assembly seats in the 10th Legislative District, covering portions of Monmouth County and Ocean County. Kennedy shifted to the New Jersey Senate, and Villane was re-elected to the Assembly in the 10th District in 1977 and 1979 with William F. Dowd.

In redistricting following the 1980 United States census, Villane was shifted to the 11th Legislative District. In the general elections in 1981, 1983, 1985 and 1987, Villane was re-elected with Republican running mate Joseph A. Palaia. From 1985 to 1988, Villane served as head of the Assembly's Appropriations Committee, where he was successful in delivering aid to communities in Monmouth County. In December 1980. Governor of New Jersey Brendan Byrne signed into law a bill sponsored by Villane that specified a jail sentence of up to six months for those who "recklessly organizes" a hazing ritual that seriously injures a pledge as part of initiation practices. As chairman of the Assembly's Select Committee on Tourism, Villane was the chief sponsor of the Fair Beaches Act in 1987, which would ensure that shore municipalities would be required to receive state approval for beach access fees, some of which are the country's highest charges. In an effort to prevent the dumping of garbage and medical waste that had washed ashore in New Jersey, leading to a drop in tourism, Villane and Assembly Speaker Chuck Hardwick co-sponsored a bill that passed the Assembly in February 1988 by a 72–1 margin allocating $1.5 million to be used to fund a blimp that would search for illegal ocean dumping along the Jersey Shore during the summer months. Cameras on the airship would identify those dumping waste off the coast and a telephone number printed on the blimp's side would allow residents to call in tips. Despite what he described as a "giggle factor" in using a blimp, Villane advocated for the use of an airship as a more visible surveillance tool that could loiter for extended periods of time and use far less fuel than fixed-wing aircraft or helicopters.

Following the death of Representative James J. Howard, Villane lost the June 1988 primary to Joseph Azzolina to fill the seat in New Jersey's 3rd Congressional District.

Villane gave up his dental practice and resigned from office on July 11, 1988, after being confirmed to serve as commissioner of the New Jersey Department of Community Affairs to succeed Leonard S. Coleman, Jr. in the cabinet of Governor of New Jersey Thomas Kean. As part of the $95,000-a-year job, Villane oversaw a department with 1,000 employees that administered a budget of $400 million. Democrat John Villapiano defeated Villane's son Thomas in a September 15, 1988, special election to fill the vacant seat, and was sworn into office on September 28, 1988, cutting the Republican majority in the Assembly to 41–39. Villane served until January 1990, and was succeeded by Randy Primas, who became DCA commissioner after serving nine years as Mayor of Camden, New Jersey.

In January 1990, Villane was named to serve as the New York / New Jersey regional administrator of the United States Department of Housing and Urban Development to succeed Joseph Monticciolo. He was the first New Jersey resident to hold the position.

A resident of Eatontown, New Jersey, Villane died on June 29, 2022, at Monmouth Medical Center in Long Branch. He was survived by his wife of 69 years, the former Sarah Belverio.

New Jersey General Assembly
Preceded by Gertrude Berman; William P. Fitzpatrick	Member of the New Jersey General Assembly from the 10th district January 6, 1976–January 5, 1982; Served alongside: Brian Kennedy, William F. Dowd	Succeeded by John Paul Doyle; Warren Wolf
Preceded by John O. Bennett; Marie Sheehan Muhler	Member of the New Jersey General Assembly from the 11th district January 6, 1982–July 11, 1988; Served alongside: Joseph A. Palaia	Succeeded by John Villapiano
Political offices
Preceded by Leonard S. Coleman Jr.	Commissioner of the New Jersey Department of Community Affairs; October 26, 1988–January 16, 1990; Acting: July 7, 1988 – October 26, 1988	Succeeded by Randy Primas
