= New Jersey's 10th legislative district =

American legislative district

- Senator: James W. Holzapfel (R)
- Assembly members: Paul Kanitra (R); Gregory P. McGuckin (R)
- Registration: 40.52% Republican; 22.01% Democratic; 36.29% unaffiliated
- Demographics: 82.1% White; 3.6% Black/African American; 0.4% Native American; 2.8% Asian; 0.0% Hawaiian/Pacific Islander; 3.8% Other race; 7.3% Two or more races; 10.9% Hispanic
- Population: 228,713
- Voting-age population: 190,141
- Registered voters: 181,208

New Jersey's 10th legislative district is one of 40 in the state, covering the Ocean County municipalities of Bay Head Borough, Brick Township, Island Heights Borough, Lavallette Borough, Mantoloking Borough, Point Pleasant Beach Borough, Point Pleasant Borough, Seaside Park Borough, Seaside Heights Borough, South Toms River Borough, and Toms River Township; as well as covering the Monmouth County municipalities of Brielle, Manasquan Borough, Sea Girt, Spring Lake, and Spring Lake Heights.

== Demographic characteristics ==
As of the 2020 United States census, the district had a population of 228,713, of whom 190,141 (83.1%) were of voting age. The racial makeup of the district was 187,759 (82.1%) White, 8,128 (3.6%) African American, 929 (0.4%) Native American, 6,436 (2.8%) Asian, 36 (0.0%) Pacific Islander, 8,690 (3.8%) from some other race, and 16,735 (7.3%) from two or more races. Hispanic or Latino of any race were 25,017 (10.9%) of the population.

The district had 181,208 registered voters as of March 1, 2025, of whom 68,652 (38.1%) were registered as unaffiliated, 70,769 (39.3%) were registered as Republicans, 38,438 (21.3%) were registered as Democrats, and 2,206 (1.2%) were registered to other parties.

== Political representation ==
For the 2026–2027 session, the 10th legislative district of the New Jersey Legislature is represented in the State Senate by James W. Holzapfel (R, Toms River) and in the General Assembly by Paul Kanitra (R, Point Pleasant Beach) and Gregory P. McGuckin (R, Toms River).

The legislative district is entirely within New Jersey's 4th congressional district.

== 1965–1973 ==
Following the 1964 Supreme Court decision in Reynolds v. Sims, legislative districts were required to be made as equal as possible with regards to total population. In the State Senate elections held in 1965, the 10th district consisted of Morris, Sussex, and Warren counties. For the remainder of the terms from the 1967 elections until the 1973 elections, it consisted of only Morris County with the district split into two Assembly districts (10A and 10B).

Two Senators were elected from this district in each of the regular Senate elections held. Republicans Thomas J. Hillery and Milton Woolfenden, Jr. were elected in 1965. Harry L. Sears and Joseph J. Maraziti (both Republican) won the 1967 election for a four-year term. Republicans Maraziti and Peter W. Thomas won the 1971 election, though both would not complete their term; Maraziti was elected to Congress in 1972 and resigned shortly before taking office in January 1973 and Thomas would resign on November 29, 1973 to become a Superior Court judge. Democrat Stephen B. Wiley would win the remainder of Maraziti's term in a 1973 special election.

For the 1967 and 1969 elections, Assembly District 10A was located in the southern portion of Morris County, stretching from Chester Township to Parsippany, and Assembly District 10B making up the remainder of the county. In the 1971 election, District 10B ran through the east-central portion of the county running from Morris Township northeast to Butler with a spur to Randolph Township and Dover. District 10A consisted of the "C" that was formed in the county. In all instances, two members from each district were sent to the Assembly in each election.

The members elected to the Assembly from each district are as follows:

| Session | District 10A | District 10B |
|---|---|---|
| 1968–1969 | Josephine Margetts (R) | Everett B. Vreeland (R) |
| 1968–1969 | Peter W. Thomas (R) | W. Allen Cobb (R) |
| 1970–1971 | Josephine Margetts (R) | Everett B. Vreeland (R) (Note: Died on August 21, 1971) |
| 1970–1971 | W. Allen Cobb (R) | Peter W. Thomas (R) |
| 1972–1973 | Josephine Margetts (R) | James P. Vreeland (R) |
| 1972–1973 | Albert W. Merck (R) | Ann Klein (D) |

== District composition since 1973 ==
When the 40 equal-population map was created in 1973, the 10th district ran along the beach towns of Monmouth County from Monmouth Beach to Brielle; it also included the large suburb of Wall Township and two Ocean County boroughs, Point Pleasant and Point Pleasant Beach. In the 1981 redistricting, the 10th was shifted south, only keeping Point Pleasant and Point Pleasant Beach. The 10th included the large suburbs of Lakewood Township, Brick Township, and Dover Township (now Toms River Township). As a result of shifting population towards the suburban Ocean County townships, the 1991 redistricting eliminated Lakewood and Point Pleasant from the 10th district. The 2001 redistricting brought little change to the 10th, only adding South Toms River, Seaside Park, Point Pleasant, and Monmouth County's Manasquan.

== Election history ==
| Session | Senate | General Assembly | |
|---|---|---|---|
| 1974–1975 | Herbert J. Buehler (D) | Gertrude Berman (D) | William P. Fitzpatrick (D) (Note: Died March 1, 1975) |
| 1976–1977 | Herbert J. Buehler (D) | Brian T. Kennedy (R) | Anthony M. Villane (R) |
| 1978–1979 | Brian T. Kennedy (R) | William F. Dowd (R) | Anthony M. Villane (R) |
| 1980–1981 | Brian T. Kennedy (R) | William F. Dowd (R) | Anthony M. Villane (R) |
| 1982–1983 | John F. Russo (D) | Warren H. Wolf (R) | John Paul Doyle (D) |
| 1984–1985 | John F. Russo (D) | Marlene Lynch Ford (D) | John Paul Doyle (D) |
| 1986–1987 | John F. Russo (D) | Robert Singer (R) | John Paul Doyle (D) |
| 1988–1989 | John F. Russo (D) | Robert Singer (R) | John Paul Doyle (D) |
| 1990–1991 | John F. Russo (D) | Marlene Lynch Ford (D) | John Paul Doyle (D) |
| 1992–1993 | Andrew R. Ciesla (R) | Virginia E. Haines (R) | David W. Wolfe (R) |
| 1994–1995 | Andrew R. Ciesla (R) | Virginia E. Haines (R) (Note: Resigned June 30, 1994 to become executive director of the New Jersey Lottery) | David W. Wolfe (R) |
| 1994–1995 | Andrew R. Ciesla (R) | James W. Holzapfel (R) (Note: Appointed August 15, 1994, won November 8, 1994 special election to complete term) | David W. Wolfe (R) |
| 1996–1997 | Andrew R. Ciesla (R) | James W. Holzapfel (R) | David W. Wolfe (R) |
| 1998–1999 | Andrew R. Ciesla (R) | James W. Holzapfel (R) | David W. Wolfe (R) |
| 2000–2001 | Andrew R. Ciesla (R) | James W. Holzapfel (R) | David W. Wolfe (R) |
| 2002–2003 | Andrew R. Ciesla (R) | James W. Holzapfel (R) | David W. Wolfe (R) |
| 2004–2005 | Andrew R. Ciesla (R) | James W. Holzapfel (R) | David W. Wolfe (R) |
| 2006–2007 | Andrew R. Ciesla (R) | James W. Holzapfel (R) | David W. Wolfe (R) |
| 2008–2009 | Andrew R. Ciesla (R) | James W. Holzapfel (R) | David W. Wolfe (R) |
| 2010–2011 | Andrew R. Ciesla (R) | James W. Holzapfel (R) | David W. Wolfe (R) |
| 2012–2013 | James W. Holzapfel (R) | Gregory P. McGuckin (R) | David W. Wolfe (R) |
| 2014–2015 | James W. Holzapfel (R) | Gregory P. McGuckin (R) | David W. Wolfe (R) |
| 2016–2017 | James W. Holzapfel (R) | Gregory P. McGuckin (R) | David W. Wolfe (R) |
| 2018–2019 | James W. Holzapfel (R) | Gregory P. McGuckin (R) | David W. Wolfe (R) |
| 2020–2021 | James W. Holzapfel (R) | Gregory P. McGuckin (R) | John Catalano (R) |
| 2022–2023 | James W. Holzapfel (R) | Gregory P. McGuckin (R) | John Catalano (R) |
| 2024–2025 | James W. Holzapfel (R) | Gregory P. McGuckin (R) | Paul Kanitra (R) |
| 2026–2027 | James W. Holzapfel (R) | Gregory P. McGuckin (R) | Paul Kanitra (R) |

== Election results, 1973–present ==
=== Senate ===
2021 New Jersey general election
| Party | Candidate | Votes | % | ±% |
|---|---|---|---|---|
| Republican | Jim Holzapfel | 57,021 | 69.0 | ▲6.5 |
| Democratic | Emma Mammano | 25,635 | 31.0 | ▼6.5 |
| Total votes | | 82,656 | 100.0 | |

New Jersey general election, 2017
| Party | Candidate | Votes | % | ±% |
|---|---|---|---|---|
| Republican | Jim Holzapfel | 39,555 | 62.5 | ▼7.2 |
| Democratic | Emma L. Mammano | 23,707 | 37.5 | ▲7.2 |
| Total votes | | 63,262 | 100.0 | |

New Jersey general election, 2013
| Party | Candidate | Votes | % | ±% |
|---|---|---|---|---|
| Republican | Jim Holzapfel | 45,565 | 69.7 | ▲5.7 |
| Democratic | John Bendel | 19,807 | 30.3 | ▼5.7 |
| Total votes | | 65,372 | 100.0 | |

2011 New Jersey general election
| Party | Candidate | Votes | % |
|---|---|---|---|
| Republican | Jim Holzapfel | 28,675 | 64.0 |
| Democratic | Charles P. Tivenan | 16,105 | 36.0 |
| Total votes | | 44,780 | 100.0 |

2007 New Jersey general election
| Party | Candidate | Votes | % | ±% |
|---|---|---|---|---|
| Republican | Andrew R. Ciesla | 30,164 | 62.9 | ▼2.2 |
| Democratic | Britta Forsberg Wenzel | 15,712 | 32.8 | ▼2.1 |
| Libertarian | Jim Miller | 2,042 | 4.3 | N/A |
| Total votes | | 47,918 | 100.0 | |

2003 New Jersey general election
| Party | Candidate | Votes | % | ±% |
|---|---|---|---|---|
| Republican | Andrew R. Ciesla | 29,752 | 65.1 | ▲8.3 |
| Democratic | James M. Blaney | 15,960 | 34.9 | ▼8.3 |
| Total votes | | 45,712 | 100.0 | |

2001 New Jersey general election
| Party | Candidate | Votes | % |
|---|---|---|---|
| Republican | Andrew R. Ciesla | 36,329 | 56.8 |
| Democratic | Timothy E. Ryan | 27,609 | 43.2 |
| Total votes | | 63,938 | 100.0 |

1997 New Jersey general election
| Party | Candidate | Votes | % | ±% |
|---|---|---|---|---|
| Republican | Andrew R. Ciesla | 41,409 | 60.6 | ▼1.1 |
| Democratic | Judith G. Leone | 24,217 | 35.5 | ▼0.3 |
| Libertarian | Steve Nagle | 1,381 | 2.0 | N/A |
| Conservative | Agnes A. James | 1,015 | 1.5 | ▼1.0 |
| Green | Edith Gbur | 278 | 0.4 | N/A |
| Total votes | | 68,300 | 100.0 | |

1993 New Jersey general election
| Party | Candidate | Votes | % | ±% |
|---|---|---|---|---|
| Republican | Andrew R. Ciesla | 43,246 | 61.7 | ▲0.1 |
| Democratic | Anthony Carracino | 25,122 | 35.8 | ▼2.6 |
| Conservative | Louis B. Wary, Jr. | 1,766 | 2.5 | N/A |
| Total votes | | 70,134 | 100.0 | |

1991 New Jersey general election
| Party | Candidate | Votes | % |
|---|---|---|---|
| Republican | Andrew R. Ciesla | 34,711 | 61.6 |
| Democratic | John Paul Doyle | 21,643 | 38.4 |
| Total votes | | 56,354 | 100.0 |

1987 New Jersey general election
| Party | Candidate | Votes | % | ±% |
|---|---|---|---|---|
| Democratic | John F. Russo | 30,655 | 58.4 | ▼4.9 |
| Republican | Tom Blomquist | 21,876 | 41.6 | ▲4.9 |
| Total votes | | 52,531 | 100.0 | |

1983 New Jersey general election
| Party | Candidate | Votes | % | ±% |
|---|---|---|---|---|
| Democratic | John F. Russo | 31,807 | 63.3 | ▲4.7 |
| Republican | Bob Fall | 18,413 | 36.7 | ▼4.7 |
| Total votes | | 50,220 | 100.0 | |

1981 New Jersey general election
| Party | Candidate | Votes | % |
|---|---|---|---|
| Democratic | John F. Russo | 38,166 | 58.6 |
| Republican | Hazel S. Gluck | 26,933 | 41.4 |
| Total votes | | 65,099 | 100.0 |

1977 New Jersey general election
| Party | Candidate | Votes | % | ±% |
|---|---|---|---|---|
| Republican | Brian T. Kennedy | 29,059 | 54.3 | ▲9.4 |
| Democratic | Herbert J. Buehler | 23,990 | 44.8 | ▼10.3 |
| Let's Work Together | Franco DiDomenica | 502 | 0.9 | N/A |
| Total votes | | 53,551 | 100.0 | |

1973 New Jersey general election
| Party | Candidate | Votes | % |
|---|---|---|---|
| Democratic | Herbert J. Buehler | 29,819 | 55.1 |
| Republican | Richard R. Stout | 24,294 | 44.9 |
| Total votes | | 54,113 | 100.0 |

=== General Assembly ===
2021 New Jersey general election
| Party | Candidate | Votes | % | ±% |
|---|---|---|---|---|
| Republican | Gregory P. McGuckin | 55,871 | 34.6 | ▲3.2 |
| Republican | John Catalano | 55,463 | 34.4 | ▲3.8 |
| Democratic | Mary "Sharon" Quilter | 25,115 | 15.6 | ▼2.8 |
| Democratic | Garitt "Tony" Kono | 24,986 | 15.5 | ▼2.6 |
| Total votes | | 161,435 | 100.0 | |

2019 New Jersey general election
| Party | Candidate | Votes | % | ±% |
|---|---|---|---|---|
| Republican | Gregory P. McGuckin | 31,734 | 31.4 | ▲0.8 |
| Republican | John Catalano | 30,878 | 30.6 | ▼1.1 |
| Democratic | Eileen Della Volle | 18,592 | 18.4 | ▼0.5 |
| Democratic | Erin Wheeler | 18,263 | 18.1 | ▼0.6 |
| Integrity Experience Leadership | Vincent R. Barrella | 845 | 0.8 | N/A |
| Addressing Systemic Issues | Ian Holmes | 669 | 0.7 | N/A |
| Total votes | | 100,981 | 100.0 | |

New Jersey general election, 2017
| Party | Candidate | Votes | % | ±% |
|---|---|---|---|---|
| Republican | Dave Wolfe | 39,265 | 31.7 | ▼0.2 |
| Republican | Gregory P. McGuckin | 37,896 | 30.6 | ▲0.6 |
| Democratic | Michael B. Cooke | 23,417 | 18.9 | ▼0.9 |
| Democratic | Raymond Baker | 23,174 | 18.7 | ▲0.2 |
| Total votes | | 123,752 | 100.0 | |

New Jersey general election, 2015
| Party | Candidate | Votes | % | ±% |
|---|---|---|---|---|
| Republican | Dave Wolfe | 19,882 | 31.9 | ▼3.1 |
| Republican | Gregory P. McGuckin | 18,543 | 30.0 | ▼3.4 |
| Democratic | Kimberley S. Casten | 12,302 | 19.8 | ▲3.6 |
| Democratic | Valter Must | 11,513 | 18.5 | ▲3.1 |
| Total votes | | 62,240 | 100.0 | |

New Jersey general election, 2013
| Party | Candidate | Votes | % | ±% |
|---|---|---|---|---|
| Republican | Dave Wolfe | 44,627 | 35.0 | ▲3.0 |
| Republican | Gregory P. McGuckin | 42,586 | 33.4 | ▲2.7 |
| Democratic | Susan Kane | 20,647 | 16.2 | ▼3.1 |
| Democratic | Amber Gesslein | 19,658 | 15.4 | ▼2.6 |
| Total votes | | 127,518 | 100.0 | |

New Jersey general election, 2011
| Party | Candidate | Votes | % |
|---|---|---|---|
| Republican | Dave Wolfe | 27,955 | 32.0 |
| Republican | Gregory P. McGuckin | 26,831 | 30.7 |
| Democratic | Bette Wary | 16,909 | 19.3 |
| Democratic | Eli L. Eytan | 15,698 | 18.0 |
| Total votes | | 87,393 | 100.0 |

New Jersey general election, 2009
| Party | Candidate | Votes | % | ±% |
|---|---|---|---|---|
| Republican | David W. Wolfe | 47,336 | 36.4 | ▲4.8 |
| Republican | Jim Holzapfel | 45,916 | 35.3 | ▲4.3 |
| Democratic | Charles P. Tivenan | 18,739 | 14.4 | ▼2.2 |
| Democratic | Eli L. Eytan | 18,090 | 13.9 | ▼2.4 |
| Total votes | | 130,081 | 100.0 | |

New Jersey general election, 2007
| Party | Candidate | Votes | % | ±% |
|---|---|---|---|---|
| Republican | David W. Wolfe | 29,619 | 31.6 | ▼0.7 |
| Republican | Jim Holzapfel | 29,014 | 31.0 | ▼0.7 |
| Democratic | John Kaklamanis | 15,560 | 16.6 | ▼1.2 |
| Democratic | Salvatore Martino | 15,282 | 16.3 | ▼1.4 |
| Green | Elizabeth Arnone | 2,226 | 2.4 | N/A |
| Green | Matthew Q. Dimon | 2,029 | 2.2 | N/A |
| Total votes | | 93,730 | 100.0 | |

New Jersey general election, 2005
| Party | Candidate | Votes | % | ±% |
|---|---|---|---|---|
| Republican | David W. Wolfe | 40,660 | 32.3 | ▲0.4 |
| Republican | Jim Holzapfel | 39,981 | 31.7 | ▲1.2 |
| Democratic | Lawrence Jones | 22,398 | 17.8 | ▲0.3 |
| Democratic | Joni Jones | 22,312 | 17.7 | ▲0.6 |
| Socialist | Scott Baier | 584 | 0.5 | N/A |
| Total votes | | 125,935 | 100.0 | |

New Jersey general election, 2003
| Party | Candidate | Votes | % | ±% |
|---|---|---|---|---|
| Republican | David W. Wolfe | 28,812 | 31.9 | ▲2.7 |
| Republican | Jim Holzapfel | 27,509 | 30.5 | ▲1.5 |
| Democratic | Desmond Abazia | 15,773 | 17.5 | ▼3.6 |
| Democratic | Mark Troncone | 15,418 | 17.1 | ▼3.7 |
| Green | Elizabeth Arnone | 2,765 | 3.1 | N/A |
| Total votes | | 90,277 | 100.0 | |

New Jersey general election, 2001
| Party | Candidate | Votes | % |
|---|---|---|---|
| Republican | David W. Wolfe | 36,989 | 29.2 |
| Republican | James W. Holzapfel | 36,747 | 29.0 |
| Democratic | John Furey | 26,723 | 21.1 |
| Democratic | Kimberley Casten | 26,307 | 20.8 |
| Total votes | | 126,766 | 100.0 |

New Jersey general election, 1999
| Party | Candidate | Votes | % | ±% |
|---|---|---|---|---|
| Republican | James W. Holzapfel | 23,227 | 29.3 | ▼1.5 |
| Republican | David W. Wolfe | 23,145 | 29.2 | ▼2.0 |
| Democratic | Stephanie Wauters | 15,895 | 20.1 | ▲2.5 |
| Democratic | Samuel D. Kaye | 14,764 | 18.6 | ▲2.0 |
| Conservative | Morgan Strong | 1,105 | 1.4 | ▲0.6 |
| Conservative | Anthony Bertani | 1,058 | 1.3 | ▲0.3 |
| Total votes | | 79,194 | 100.0 | |

New Jersey general election, 1997
| Party | Candidate | Votes | % | ±% |
|---|---|---|---|---|
| Republican | David W. Wolfe | 41,746 | 31.2 | ▲2.3 |
| Republican | James W. Holzapfel | 41,117 | 30.8 | ▲2.0 |
| Democratic | Regina Calandrillo | 23,538 | 17.6 | ▼0.9 |
| Democratic | Jim Margetis | 22,239 | 16.6 | ▼0.9 |
| Libertarian | Betty Florentine | 1,381 | 1.0 | N/A |
| Libertarian | Christopher Kawa | 1,317 | 1.0 | N/A |
| Conservative | Edward C. Mueller | 1,292 | 1.0 | ▼2.1 |
| Conservative | J. Morgan Strong | 1,068 | 0.8 | ▼2.3 |
| Total votes | | 133,698 | 100.0 | |

New Jersey general election, 1995
| Party | Candidate | Votes | % | ±% |
|---|---|---|---|---|
| Republican | David W. Wolfe | 22,837 | 28.9 | ▼1.4 |
| Republican | James W. Holzapfel | 22,806 | 28.8 | ▼1.6 |
| Democratic | Richard P. Strada | 14,669 | 18.5 | ▼0.3 |
| Democratic | Richard Sevrin | 13,836 | 17.5 | ▼0.6 |
| Conservative | Gary J. Rich | 2,483 | 3.1 | ▲1.8 |
| Conservative | Agnes A. James | 2,455 | 3.1 | ▲1.9 |
| Total votes | | 79,086 | 100.0 | |

Special election, November 8, 1994
| Party | Candidate | Votes | % |
|---|---|---|---|
| Republican | James W. Holzapfel | 38,538 | 67.5 |
| Democratic | Louis B. Wary, Jr. | 17,751 | 31.1 |
| Conservative | Agnes A. James | 838 | 1.5 |
| Total votes | | 57,127 | 100.0 |

New Jersey general election, 1993
| Party | Candidate | Votes | % | ±% |
|---|---|---|---|---|
| Republican | Virginia “Ginny” Haines | 42,132 | 30.4 | ▼1.2 |
| Republican | David W. Wolfe | 42,010 | 30.3 | ▼0.6 |
| Democratic | Thomas J. Mallon | 26,101 | 18.8 | ▼0.4 |
| Democratic | John F. Phillips | 25,096 | 18.1 | ▼0.2 |
| Conservative | Gary J. Rich | 1,820 | 1.3 | N/A |
| Conservative | Michael S. Permuko | 1,647 | 1.2 | N/A |
| Total votes | | 138,806 | 100.0 | |

1991 New Jersey general election
| Party | Candidate | Votes | % |
|---|---|---|---|
| Republican | Virginia “Ginny” Haines | 35,093 | 31.6 |
| Republican | David W. Wolfe | 34,368 | 30.9 |
| Democratic | Marlene Lynch Ford | 21,384 | 19.2 |
| Democratic | Paul C. Brush | 20,311 | 18.3 |
| Total votes | | 111,156 | 100.0 |

1989 New Jersey general election
| Party | Candidate | Votes | % | ±% |
|---|---|---|---|---|
| Democratic | John Paul Doyle | 39,049 | 28.2 | ▲0.9 |
| Democratic | Marlene Lynch Ford | 36,706 | 26.5 | ▲1.1 |
| Republican | Robert W. Singer | 33,139 | 24.0 | ▼2.0 |
| Republican | John A. Peterson, Jr. | 29,460 | 21.3 | 0.0 |
| Total votes | | 138,354 | 100.0 | |

1987 New Jersey general election
| Party | Candidate | Votes | % | ±% |
|---|---|---|---|---|
| Democratic | John Paul Doyle | 28,502 | 27.3 | ▲1.4 |
| Republican | Robert W. Singer | 27,171 | 26.0 | ▲0.5 |
| Democratic | Marlene Lynch Ford | 26,484 | 25.4 | ▲1.2 |
| Republican | Robert A. Gasser | 22,258 | 21.3 | ▼2.9 |
| Total votes | | 104,415 | 100.0 | |

1985 New Jersey general election
| Party | Candidate | Votes | % | ±% |
|---|---|---|---|---|
| Democratic | John Paul Doyle | 30,055 | 25.9 | ▼3.3 |
| Republican | Robert W. Singer | 29,621 | 25.5 | ▲1.9 |
| Republican | Roden S. Lightbody | 28,179 | 24.2 | ▲3.5 |
| Democratic | Marlene Lynch Ford | 28,159 | 24.2 | ▼1.5 |
| Libertarian | Wallace Gluck | 217 | 0.2 | N/A |
| Total votes | | 116,231 | 100.0 | |

New Jersey general election, 1983
| Party | Candidate | Votes | % | ±% |
|---|---|---|---|---|
| Democratic | John Paul Doyle | 28,887 | 29.2 | ▲2.9 |
| Democratic | Marlene Lynch Ford | 25,427 | 25.7 | ▲3.3 |
| Republican | Warren H. Wolf | 23,315 | 23.6 | ▼3.2 |
| Republican | Lawrence L. McIver | 20,475 | 20.7 | ▼2.8 |
| Citizens | John Kinnevy, III | 793 | 0.8 | ▼0.2 |
| Total votes | | 98,897 | 100.0 | |

New Jersey general election, 1981
| Party | Candidate | Votes | % |
|---|---|---|---|
| Republican | Warren H. Wolf | 33,841 | 26.8 |
| Democratic | John Paul Doyle | 33,199 | 26.3 |
| Republican | Robert A. Fall | 29,730 | 23.5 |
| Democratic | Peter A. Marone | 28,328 | 22.4 |
| Citizens | John Kinnevy, III | 1,260 | 1.0 |
| Total votes | | 126,358 | 100.0 |

New Jersey general election, 1979
| Party | Candidate | Votes | % | ±% |
|---|---|---|---|---|
| Republican | Anthony M. “Doc” Villane, Jr. | 28,958 | 28.6 | ▲0.2 |
| Republican | William F. Dowd | 27,101 | 26.7 | ▼1.1 |
| Democratic | Carl M. Marchetti | 23,141 | 22.8 | ▲0.7 |
| Democratic | James A. Carey | 22,185 | 21.9 | ▲1.9 |
| Total votes | | 101,385 | 100.0 | |

New Jersey general election, 1977
| Party | Candidate | Votes | % | ±% |
|---|---|---|---|---|
| Republican | Anthony M. Villane, Jr. | 29,995 | 28.4 | ▲3.0 |
| Republican | William F. Dowd | 29,378 | 27.8 | ▲1.2 |
| Democratic | Gertrude Berman | 23,384 | 22.1 | ▼1.3 |
| Democratic | Richard J. Rooney | 21,200 | 20.0 | ▼1.9 |
| Libertarian | Russell J. Malta | 707 | 0.7 | N/A |
| Independent | Hilory D. O’Neal | 485 | 0.5 | N/A |
| Independent | Albert J. Williams | 469 | 0.4 | N/A |
| Independent | Samuel E. Volovick | 118 | 0.1 | N/A |
| Total votes | | 105,736 | 100.0 | |

New Jersey general election, 1975
| Party | Candidate | Votes | % | ±% |
|---|---|---|---|---|
| Republican | Brian T. Kennedy | 27,403 | 26.6 | ▲3.3 |
| Republican | Anthony M. Villane, Jr. | 26,227 | 25.4 | ▲2.6 |
| Democratic | Gertrude Berman | 24,150 | 23.4 | ▼3.4 |
| Democratic | Richard J. Connors | 22,570 | 21.9 | ▼4.6 |
| Economy Honesty Concern | John J. Novello | 1,403 | 1.4 | N/A |
| Independent Citizen | Benjamin C. Douglas | 1,401 | 1.4 | N/A |
| Total votes | | 103,154 | 100.0 | |

New Jersey general election, 1973
| Party | Candidate | Votes | % |
|---|---|---|---|
| Democratic | Gertrude Berman | 28,362 | 26.8 |
| Democratic | William P. Fitzpatrick | 28,046 | 26.5 |
| Republican | Brian T. Kennedy | 24,648 | 23.3 |
| Republican | Daniel S. Kruman | 24,173 | 22.8 |
| Independent | William H. Jackson | 608 | 0.6 |
| Total votes | | 105,837 | 100.0 |

== Election results, 1965–1973 ==
=== Senate ===
1965 New Jersey general election
| Party | Candidate | Votes | % |
|---|---|---|---|
| Republican | Thomas J. Hillery | 89,839 | 31.4 |
| Republican | Milton Woolfenden, Jr. | 85,192 | 29.8 |
| Democratic | Ruth C. Mitchell | 57,038 | 20.0 |
| Democratic | Irene Mackey Smith | 53,823 | 18.8 |
| Total votes | | 285,892 | 100.0 |

1967 New Jersey general election
| Party | Candidate | Votes | % |
|---|---|---|---|
| Republican | Harry L. Sears | 63,791 | 35.1 |
| Republican | Joseph J. Maraziti | 63,668 | 35.0 |
| Democratic | Dale W. Swann | 26,248 | 14.4 |
| Democratic | Martin F. Quinn | 24,694 | 13.6 |
| Conservative | Victor J. De Falco | 1,708 | 0.9 |
| Conservative | Charles Covino | 1,650 | 0.9 |
| Total votes | | 181,759 | 100.0 |

1971 New Jersey general election
| Party | Candidate | Votes | % |
|---|---|---|---|
| Republican | Joseph J. Maraziti | 63,773 | 33.3 |
| Republican | Peter W. Thomas | 58,532 | 30.5 |
| Democratic | Garret A. Hobart IV | 35,087 | 18.3 |
| Democratic | Frank J. Schweighardt | 34,396 | 17.9 |
| Total votes | | 191,788 | 100.0 |

Special election, November 6, 1973
| Party | Candidate | Votes | % |
|---|---|---|---|
| Democratic | Stephen B. Wiley | 51,133 | 51.1 |
| Republican | Josephine S. Margetts | 48,899 | 48.9 |
| Total votes | | 100,032 | 100.0 |

=== General Assembly ===
==== District 10A ====
New Jersey general election, 1967
| Party | Candidate | Votes | % |
|---|---|---|---|
| Republican | Josephine S. Margetts | 30,443 | 33.1 |
| Republican | Peter W. Thomas | 29,891 | 32.5 |
| Democratic | Edward F. Broderick, Jr. | 17,329 | 18.8 |
| Democratic | David Simon | 13,706 | 14.9 |
| Rights, Peace, Community | Adriaan van L. Maas | 655 | 0.7 |
| Total votes | | 92,024 | 100.0 |

New Jersey general election, 1969
| Party | Candidate | Votes | % |
|---|---|---|---|
| Republican | Josephine S. Margetts | 38,181 | 33.1 |
| Republican | W. Allen Cobb | 35,885 | 31.1 |
| Democratic | Stephen B. Richer | 20,706 | 18.0 |
| Democratic | Frederick W. Liebhauser | 19,381 | 16.8 |
| National Conservative | Robert G. Wright | 547 | 0.5 |
| National Conservative | Thomas G. Kaufman | 528 | 0.5 |
| Total votes | | 115,228 | 100.0 |

New Jersey general election, 1971
| Party | Candidate | Votes | % |
|---|---|---|---|
| Republican | Josephine S. Margetts | 33,559 | 34.7 |
| Republican | Albert W. Merck | 31,156 | 32.2 |
| Democratic | Roger L. Kohn | 16,285 | 16.9 |
| Democratic | Leonard F. Marcy | 15,628 | 16.2 |
| Total votes | | 96,628 | 100.0 |

==== District 10B ====
New Jersey general election, 1967
| Party | Candidate | Votes | % |
|---|---|---|---|
| Republican | Everett B. Vreeland | 28,995 | 33.0 |
| Republican | W. Allen Cobb | 27,882 | 31.7 |
| Democratic | George Korpita, Jr. | 15,223 | 17.3 |
| Democratic | Theodore E. B. Einhorn | 14,020 | 15.9 |
| Conservative | Robert G. Wright | 961 | 1.1 |
| Conservative | John W. Curch | 898 | 1.0 |
| Total votes | | 87,979 | 100.0 |

New Jersey general election, 1969
| Party | Candidate | Votes | % |
|---|---|---|---|
| Republican | Everett B. Vreeland | 36,399 | 33.6 |
| Republican | Peter W. Thomas | 35,994 | 33.2 |
| Democratic | Willard M. Hedden | 18,602 | 17.2 |
| Democratic | George Campbell | 17,302 | 16.0 |
| Total votes | | 108,297 | 100.0 |

New Jersey general election, 1971
| Party | Candidate | Votes | % |
|---|---|---|---|
| Republican | James P. Vreeland, Jr. | 24,875 | 27.1 |
| Democratic | Ann Klein | 24,873 | 27.1 |
| Republican | W. Allen Cobb | 21,333 | 23.2 |
| Democratic | Victor O. Cerulli | 20,685 | 22.5 |
| Total votes | | 91,766 | 100.0 |
