= James W. Holzapfel =

American politician (born 1944)

Member of the New Jersey Senate from the 10th district
- Incumbent
- Assumed office January 10, 2012
- Preceded by: Andrew R. Ciesla

Member of the New Jersey General Assembly from the 10th district
- In office August 15, 1994 – January 10, 2012
- Preceded by: Virginia E. Haines
- Succeeded by: Gregory P. McGuckin

Personal details
- Born: October 9, 1944 (age 81) Point Pleasant Beach, New Jersey, U.S.
- Party: Republican
- Spouse: Joyce Holden
- Children: 2
- Education: Monmouth College (BA); Seton Hall University (JD)
- Occupation: Attorney
- Website: Legislative Website

James William "Jim" Holzapfel (born October 9, 1944) is an American lawyer and Republican Party politician, who serves in the New Jersey State Senate as of January 10, 2012, representing the 10th legislative district. Before his election to the Senate he had served in the New Jersey General Assembly since 2003.

== Early life ==
Born in Point Pleasant Beach, New Jersey, Holzapfel is a graduate of Point Pleasant Beach High School. He received a B.A. from Monmouth College in Pre-Law and was awarded a J.D. degree from the Seton Hall University School of Law. He is a resident of Toms River. He is married to Joyce Holzapfel (née Holden) and has two children, Dennis and Jennifer.

== Political career ==
Holzapfel served as a Trustee of Ocean County College from 1988 to 1994. He was the Ocean County Prosecutor from 1987 to 1992. Holzapfel has been admitted to practice law since 1969 before the New Jersey Supreme Court, the Supreme Court of the United States and the Florida Supreme Court.

== New Jersey Assembly ==
Following the resignation of Assemblywoman Virginia E. Haines to become the executive director of the New Jersey Lottery, Holzapfel was appointed to fill her seat and took office on August 15, 1994. He was subsequently reelected in the 1994 special election and the regular biennial elections thereafter. He was the Deputy Republican Leader from 2002 to 2003 and was the Assistant Majority Whip from 1998 to 2000.

== New Jersey Senate ==
Having announced that he would not run again for office after 20 years in the Senate, Andrew R. Ciesla announced in February 2011 that he would support Holzapfel as his successor. In the November 2011, Holzapfel defeated Democrat Charles Tivenan by a 64%-36% margin.

=== Committees ===
Committee assignments for the 2024-2025 session are:

- State Government, Wagering, Tourism and Historic Preservation
- Transportation

=== District 10 ===
Each of the 40 districts in the New Jersey Legislature has one representative in the New Jersey Senate and two members in the New Jersey General Assembly. The representatives from the 9th District for the 2024—2025 Legislative Session are:

- Senator James W. Holzapfel (R)
- Assemblyman Paul Kanitra (R)
- Assemblyman Gregory P. McGuckin (R)

== Election history ==
=== Senate ===
10th Legislative District General Election, 2023
Party	Candidate	Votes	%
Republican	Jim Holzapfel (incumbent)	35,788	66.6
Democratic	Jeff J. Horn	17,981	33.4
Total votes		53,769	100.0
Republican hold			

10th Legislative District general election, 2021
Party	Candidate	Votes	%
Republican	Jim Holzapfel (incumbent)	57,021	68.99
Democratic	Emma Mammano	25,635	31.01
Total votes		82,656	100.0
Republican hold			

New Jersey general election, 2017
Party	Candidate	Votes	%	±%
Republican	Jim Holzapfel	39,555	62.5	▼7.2
Democratic	Emma L. Mammano	23,707	37.5	▲7.2
Total votes		'63,262'	'100.0'	

New Jersey general election, 2013
Party	Candidate	Votes	%	±%
Republican	Jim Holzapfel	45,565	69.7	▲5.7
Democratic	John Bendel	19,807	30.3	▼5.7
Total votes		'65,372'	'100.0'	

New Jersey general election, 2011
Party	Candidate	Votes	%
Republican	Jim Holzapfel	28,675	64.0
Democratic	Charles P. Tivenan	16,105	36.0
Total votes		44,780	100.0

=== Assembly ===
New Jersey general election, 2009
Party	Candidate	Votes	%	±%
Republican	David W. Wolfe	47,336	36.4	▲4.8
Republican	Jim Holzapfel	45,916	35.3	▲4.3
Democratic	Charles P. Tivenan	18,739	14.4	▼2.2
Democratic	Eli L. Eytan	18,090	13.9	▼2.4
Total votes		'130,081'	'100.0'	

New Jersey general election, 2007
Party	Candidate	Votes	%	±%
Republican	David W. Wolfe	29,619	31.6	▼0.7
Republican	Jim Holzapfel	29,014	31.0	▼0.7
Democratic	John Kaklamanis	15,560	16.6	▼1.2
Democratic	Salvatore Martino	15,282	16.3	▼1.4
Green	Elizabeth Arnone	2,226	2.4	N/A
Green	Matthew Q. Dimon	2,029	2.2	N/A
Total votes		'93,730'	'100.0'	

New Jersey general election, 2005
Party	Candidate	Votes	%	±%
Republican	David W. Wolfe	40,660	32.3	▲0.4
Republican	Jim Holzapfel	39,981	31.7	▲1.2
Democratic	Lawrence Jones	22,398	17.8	▲0.3
Democratic	Joni Jones	22,312	17.7	▲0.6
Socialist	Scott Baier	584	0.5	N/A
Total votes		'125,935'	'100.0'	

New Jersey general election, 2003
Party	Candidate	Votes	%	±%
Republican	David W. Wolfe	28,812	31.9	▲2.7
Republican	Jim Holzapfel	27,509	30.5	▲1.5
Democratic	Desmond Abazia	15,773	17.5	▼3.6
Democratic	Mark Troncone	15,418	17.1	▼3.7
Green	Elizabeth Arnone	2,765	3.1	N/A
Total votes		'90,277'	'100.0'	

New Jersey general election, 2001
Party	Candidate	Votes	%
Republican	David W. Wolfe	36,989	29.2
Republican	James W. Holzapfel	36,747	29.0
Democratic	John Furey	26,723	21.1
Democratic	Kimberley Casten	26,307	20.8
Total votes		126,766	100.0

New Jersey general election, 1999
Party	Candidate	Votes	%	±%
Republican	James W. Holzapfel	23,227	29.3	▼1.5
Republican	David W. Wolfe	23,145	29.2	▼2.0
Democratic	Stephanie Wauters	15,895	20.1	▲2.5
Democratic	Samuel D. Kaye	14,764	18.6	▲2.0
Conservative	Morgan Strong	1,105	1.4	▲0.6
Conservative	Anthony Bertani	1,058	1.3	▲0.3
Total votes		'79,194'	'100.0'	

New Jersey general election, 1997
Party	Candidate	Votes	%	±%
Republican	David W. Wolfe	41,746	31.2	▲2.3
Republican	James W. Holzapfel	41,117	30.8	▲2.0
Democratic	Regina Calandrillo	23,538	17.6	▼0.9
Democratic	Jim Margetis	22,239	16.6	▼0.9
Libertarian	Betty Florentine	1,381	1.0	N/A
Libertarian	Christopher Kawa	1,317	1.0	N/A
Conservative	Edward C. Mueller	1,292	1.0	▼2.1
Conservative	J. Morgan Strong	1,068	0.8	▼2.3
Total votes		'133,698'	'100.0'	

New Jersey general election, 1995
Party	Candidate	Votes	%	±%
Republican	David W. Wolfe	22,837	28.9	▼1.4
Republican	James W. Holzapfel	22,806	28.8	▼1.6
Democratic	Richard P. Strada	14,669	18.5	▼0.3
Democratic	Richard Sevrin	13,836	17.5	▼0.6
Conservative	Gary J. Rich	2,483	3.1	▲1.8
Conservative	Agnes A. James	2,455	3.1	▲1.9
Total votes		'79,086'	'100.0'	

Special election, November 8, 1994
Party	Candidate	Votes	%
Republican	James W. Holzapfel	38,538	67.5
Democratic	Louis B. Wary, Jr.	17,751	31.1
Conservative	Agnes A. James	838	1.5
Total votes		57,127	100.0

New Jersey Senate
Preceded by Andrew R. Ciesla	Member of the New Jersey Senate for the 10th District; January 10, 2012 – present	Succeeded by Incumbent
New Jersey General Assembly
Preceded by Virginia E. Haines	Member of the New Jersey General Assembly for the 10th District; August 15, 1994 – January 10, 2012; With: David W. Wolfe	Succeeded by Gregory P. McGuckin
