= Walter T. Margetts =

Walter T. Margetts (January 23, 1904 – March 26, 1983) was the Treasurer of the state of New Jersey from April 1949 to January 1954. His wife was assemblywoman Josephine Margetts.
