= John F. Russo =

American lawyer (1933–2017)

108th President of the New Jersey Senate
- In office January 14, 1986 – January 9, 1990
- Preceded by: Carmen A. Orechio
- Succeeded by: John A. Lynch Jr.

Member of the New Jersey Senate
- In office January 8, 1974 – January 14, 1992
- Preceded by: District created
- Succeeded by: Andrew R. Ciesla
- Constituency: 9th district (1974–1982); 10th district (1982–1992)

Personal details
- Born: July 11, 1933 Asbury Park, New Jersey, U.S.
- Died: August 12, 2017 (aged 84)
- Party: Democratic
- Education: University of Notre Dame (BA); Columbia University (JD)

John Francis Russo (July 11, 1933 – August 12, 2017) was an American attorney and Democratic Party politician from New Jersey, who served in the New Jersey Senate from 1974 to 1992 and was Senate President.

== Early life and education ==
A resident of Toms River, New Jersey, Russo was born in Asbury Park, where he attended Asbury Park High School. He was a 1955 graduate of the University of Notre Dame and received a law degree from Columbia Law School in 1958.

== Career ==
He served for nine years as an assistant prosecutor in Ocean County, and was first elected to the State Senate in 1973.

In the Senate, Russo served on the Joint Committee on Appropriations and a Special Sub-Committee on Tax Reform and was the chair of the Committee on Energy, Agriculture and Environment and the Senate Judiciary Committee. In 1982, he wrote a bill reinstating capital punishment in New Jersey. Russo served as Senate President from 1986 to 1990.

Russo ran for the Democratic Party nomination for Governor of New Jersey in 1985, placing second behind nominee Peter Shapiro, who was in turn soundly defeated by Thomas Kean in the general election.

Following his retirement from the Senate, Russo was a partner at the Princeton Public Affairs Group. In 2007, while a bill was proposed that would abolish capital punishment in the state, he sat on the Death Penalty Study Commission and testified against passage of the bill.

== Personal life and death ==
Russo married his high school sweetheart Mary Ann Carrigan in 1957.

He was a fan of the New York Giants. In 1974, when the Giants were building a new stadium in New Jersey, Russo co-sponsored a resolution in the Senate which asked the team to consider changing their name to fit their location. Eugene J. Bedell, the author of the measure, introduced Russo on the floor under the nickname "Ripper". When the Giants started the 1974 season 1–5, he attempted to remove his name from the bill because "I don't think New Jersey needs its name on a team playing like that." Amused, his fellow senators overwhelmingly voted against him.

Russo died on August 12, 2017, of esophageal cancer at the age of 84.

Political offices
Preceded by Carmen A. Orechio	President of the New Jersey Senate; 1986–1990	Succeeded by John A. Lynch, Jr.
New Jersey Senate
Preceded by Brian T. Kennedy	Member of the New Jersey Senate from the 10th district 1982–1992	Succeeded by Andrew R. Ciesla
Preceded by District created	Member of the New Jersey Senate from the 9th district 1974–1982	Succeeded by Leonard T. Connors
