= Herbert J. Buehler =

American politician

Member of the New Jersey Senate from the 10th district
- In office January 8, 1974 – January 10, 1978
- Preceded by: Richard R. Stout
- Succeeded by: Brian T. Kennedy

Member of the Ocean Township Council
- In office 1967–1971

Personal details
- Born: April 10, 1927 Bayonne, New Jersey, U.S.
- Died: June 24, 2007 (aged 80) Brick Township, New Jersey, U.S.
- Party: Democratic
- Education: Seton Hall University (B.S.); Rutgers University (M.Ed.)

Herbert John Buehler (April 10, 1927 – June 24, 2007) was an American educator and Democratic Party politician who represented coastal Monmouth County, New Jersey in the New Jersey Senate for one term from 1974 to 1978, during the administration of Governor Brendan Byrne.

Buehler began his career in politics by serving on the Ocean Township Council. In 1973, he defeated veteran Republican incumbent Richard R. Stout in a race described as the "most stunning upset" of the Democratic landslide victory by The New York Times. As state senator from the 10th legislative district, Buehler was a leading advocate for the preservation of the Jersey Shore, expanding public access to beaches, and improving rail transportation. He opposed efforts to close Fort Monmouth and to build an Exxon Oil Company superport off the coast of Long Branch and supported reforms to dredge the Port of New York and New Jersey and to rehabilitate the New York and Long Branch Railroad. He was defeated for re-election by Brian T. Kennedy in 1977.

After leaving office, Buehler made unsuccessful campaigns for governor of New Jersey in 1981, state senate in 1983, and United States House of Representatives in 1984.

== Early life and education ==
Herbert J. Buehler was born on April 10, 1927, in Bayonne, New Jersey to Clarence and Veronica Buehler. He attended Bayonne High School, where he was a member of the national champion cross country team in 1944. After graduating high school, he served in the United States Coast Guard from 1945 to 1946 before graduating from Seton Hall University in 1952 with a bachelor's degree in political science and Rutgers University in 1958 with a master's degree in education.

In 1952, he moved to Ocean Township, Monmouth County and became a teacher, working for 27 years. He received a Fulbright Program grant in 1963 and taught in Aylesbury, Buckinghamshire in England as part of the Exchange Teachers Program. He also worked as an assistant professor at Brookdale Community College for several years.

== Political career ==
In 1967, Buehler joined the Ocean Township council. He served until 1971 and was a president of the Monmouth County League of Municipalities.

=== New Jersey Senate ===
==== 1973 election ====
In 1973, Buehler ran for the New Jersey Senate against Republican incumbent Richard Stout, who had represented Monmouth County in the Senate for over twenty years. They ran in the newly created 10th district, which included Ocean Township, as well as Long Branch, Wall Township, and other shore towns. Prior to the election, the district was considered a Republican stronghold, but Buehler benefited from the popularity of Democratic gubernatorial candidate Brendan Byrne in the district and backlash against the Republican Party amid the Watergate scandal and state government corruption scandals during William T. Cahill's term as governor.

Buehler focused his attacks on Stout's transportation record, charging that he failed to attract state and federal grants to solve the region's railroad issues. Stout maintained that he and other Republicans had attempted to do so, but were obstructed by the bankruptcy of the Penn Central Railroad. Stout also backed Republican gubernatorial nominee Charles W. Sandman's proposal for a mass transit agency, while Buehler backed Byrne by proposing that the Port Authority should assume responsibility for electrifying the New York and Long Branch Railroad, which ran through the district.

Buehler won the district in a result that The New York Times referred to as the "most stunning upset" of the 1973 elections, and Stout congratulated him in person on election night. Stout attributed his defeat to "overwhelming national problems," and a "dark cloud" over the Republican Party and the Cahill administration.

==== Term ====
During his term in office, Buehler primarily worked to deliver on his promised improvement of rail transportation in the area and on legislation to preserve the Jersey Shore.

In the aftermath of the 1973 oil crisis, Buehler opposed an Exxon Oil Company proposal for an East Coast "superport" off the coast of Long Branch to reduce the costs of lightering offshore, and he introduced legislation to ban any such oil port or related pipeline or storage facilities on the Jersey Shore. "We cannot allow our decision-making process to become undermined by the false hope that a deep-water port facility off the coast of New Jersey will provide a cure-all for the present energy situation," Buehler said. "One massive spill from a supertanker might result in far greater damage than the present handling systems."

In 1975, Buehler supported Byrne in an intraparty fight with state party chair James P. Dugan. Byrne backed a challenge to Senate president Frank J. Dodd from majority leader Matthew Feldman. Both Dodd and Dugan had blocked a number of Byrne's proposals early in his first term, including his controversial tax program.

In 1975, he and Eugene J. Bedell were critical of a federal project to close Fort Monmouth and Picatinny Arsenal and called for a state investigation into the proposal. Fort Monmouth was ultimately closed in 2011 and serves as a studio for Netflix as of 2025.

Buehler was the lead sponsor and advocate for a 1977 bill to provide greater access to public beaches and expanding state oversight of municipal beach operations, including exempting fishermen accessing jetties from beach badge requirements and giving the state government a right of first refusal on all sales of public beachfront property. The proposal had its origins in Brendan Byrne's efforts to fight exclusive private beaches beginning in 1974, including the appointment of Buehler as chairman of the state Open Beaches Commission in 1976. In July 1977, he walked the entire length of the Jersey Shore from Sandy Hook to Cape May to draw attention to the bill. The walk was inspired by a similar one made by former Environmental Protection commissioner David J. Bardin during the prior year. He also worked with U.S. senator Bill Bradley, who owned a home in the district, to address pollution.

==== 1977 re-election campaign ====
In 1977, Buehler faced opposition from Sea Girt assemblyman and Republican lawyer Brian T. Kennedy. The campaign centered on opposition to Governor Byrne's controversial efforts to enact a state income tax. The New York Times described Kennedy's campaign as "vigorous" and criticized Buehler's vote in favor of the income tax, which Kennedy had voted against. Kennedy also criticized Buehler's record on transportation, arguing, "The trains are as dirty as they ever were, and they still don't run on time."

=== Later campaigns ===
==== 1981 gubernatorial campaign ====
Buehler ran for governor of New Jersey in the 1981 Democratic primary. He was among the first four candidates in the race. In March, he joined most of the Democratic field at a unity dinner in Edison which was boycotted by Governor Byrne over objections to party fundraising. By May, Buehler had raised $8,415 and spent only $7,620, falling well short of the $50,000 spending requirement for the state government to match his funding.

While running for governor, Buehler served as chair of the "Save Our Port" association, an organization dedicated to reforming the permitting process for the maintenance dredging of the Port of New York and New Jersey. "Continuation of maintenance dredging should be an assumed service," Buehler argued.

He ultimately received less than one percent of the vote in the Democratic primary.

==== 1983 state senate campaign ====
In 1983, Buehler sought to challenge Brian Kennedy for his old senate seat. However, he faced Long Branch councilman Frank Pallone in the Democratic primary. Pallone won the important endorsement of county party chair John Fiorino, and Fiorino successfully challenged Buehler's petition signatures, removing him from the ballot. Pallone ultimately won the Democratic primary with 91 percent of the vote and won a surprising, narrow victory over Kennedy in the general election.

==== 1984 congressional campaign ====
In 1984, Buehler ran for an open United States House of Representatives seat in New Jersey's 13th congressional district, which stretched from the shore to the Delaware River. The seat had been left vacant by the death of seven-term Republican incumbent Edwin B. Forsythe.

In the Democratic primary, he faced Mount Holly mayor James B. Smith, who had the support of party organizations in both Burlington and Camden counties, which accounted for 70 percent of the Democratic vote, and nuclear freeze advocate Eugene Creech. The race was complicated by redistricting, which meant that a special election and regularly scheduled election for the district were held under substantially different borders. Buehler campaigned in Democratic strongholds in Burlington County to counter Smith's endorsements.

Ultimately, Smith defeated Buehler soundly in both the special election primary and regular election primary.

== Personal life ==
After retiring from politics, Buehler traveled extensively through Europe and Asia.

Buehler wrote three books under the name John Buehler detailing his travels and other aspects of his life: Snowflake in a Blizzard, Puppets are Still Dancing, and A Glimpse into Paradise.

He died on June 24, 2007, at Ocean Medical Center in Brick Township.
