= Josephine Margetts =

American politician

Josephine Margetts (October 8, 1901 – March 3, 1989) was an American politician. She was a member of the New Jersey General Assembly from 1967 to 1973.

She was a graduate of the Ambler School of Horticulture.

A resident of Harding Township, New Jersey, she was the wife of New Jersey State Treasurer Walter T. Margetts.

New Jersey General Assembly
Preceded by District created	Member of the New Jersey General Assembly from the 10-A district 1968–1974; Served alongside: Peter W. Thomas, W. Allen Cobb, Albert W. Merck	Succeeded by District abolished
