= Gertrude Berman =

American politician

Member of the New Jersey General Assembly from the 10th Legislative District
- In office January 8, 1974 – January 13, 1976 Serving with William P. Fitzpatrick
- Preceded by: District created
- Succeeded by: Brian T. Kennedy; Anthony M. Villane

Personal details
- Born: July 3, 1924 Newark, New Jersey, U.S.
- Died: February 1, 2013 (aged 88) Newton, Massachusetts, U.S.
- Party: Democratic

Gertrude Berman (July 3, 1924 – February 1, 2013) was an American Democratic Party politician from Long Branch, New Jersey who served in the New Jersey General Assembly from the 10th Legislative District from 1974 to 1976.

She died on February 1, 2013, in Newton, Massachusetts at age 88. She was Jewish.
