= John Catalano =

American Republican Party politician

Member of the New Jersey General Assembly from the 10th District
- In office January 14, 2020 – January 9, 2024 Serving with Gregory P. McGuckin
- Preceded by: David W. Wolfe
- Succeeded by: Paul Kanitira

Personal details
- Born: November 3, 1949 (age 76)
- Party: Republican
- Education: Midwestern State University (B.S.)
- Occupation: Jeweller
- Website: Legislative Website

John Catalano (born November 3, 1949) is an American Republican Party politician, who served in the New Jersey General Assembly from 2020 to 2024, where he represented the 10th Legislative District. He was the Republican nominee for Mayor of Brick Township, New Jersey in 2023, losing to incumbent Democrat Lisa Crate.

== Biography ==
A graduate of Midwestern State University, Catalano owns and operates a jewelry store. Catalano served on the Brick Township Council in 2010.

== New Jersey Assembly ==
In March 2019, Catalano was selected by acclimation by the Ocean County Republican Party to receive the official party line for the 10th district's second assembly seat, after David W. Wolfe announced that he would be leaving the assembly after 28 years in office.

Catalano took office in the Assembly on January 14, 2020.

New Jersey General Assembly
Preceded by David W. Wolfe	Member of the New Jersey General Assembly for the 10th District; January 14, 2020 – present With: Gregory P. McGuckin	Succeeded by Incumbent
