= Brian T. Kennedy =

American politician

Member of the New Jersey Senate
- In office January 10, 1978 – January 10, 1984
- Preceded by: Herbert J. Buehler
- Succeeded by: Frank Pallone
- Constituency: 10th district (1978–1982); 11th district (1982–1984)

Member of the New Jersey General Assembly
- In office January 13, 1976 – January 10, 1978 Serving with Anthony M. Villane
- Preceded by: Gertrude Berman
- Succeeded by: William F. Dowd
- Constituency: 10th district
- In office January 11, 1972 – January 8, 1974
- Preceded by: Joseph E. Robertson
- Succeeded by: District abolished
- Constituency: District 5A

Personal details
- Born: April 11, 1934 Astoria, Queens, New York, U.S.
- Died: March 21, 2012 (aged 77) Manasquan, New Jersey, U.S.
- Party: Republican

Brian T. Kennedy (April 11, 1934 – March 21, 2012) was an American politician who served two terms in the New Jersey General Assembly from 1972 to 1974 and 1976 to 1978 and two terms in the New Jersey Senate from 1978 to 1984.

A resident of Manasquan, New Jersey, he died on March 21, 2012, at age 77.

New Jersey General Assembly
Preceded by Joseph E. Robertson	Member of the New Jersey General Assembly from the 5A district January 11, 1972–January 8, 1974; Served alongside: John I. Dawes	Succeeded by Constituency abolished
Preceded by Gertrude Berman; William P. Fitzpatrick	Member of the New Jersey General Assembly from the 10th district January 13, 1976–January 10, 1978; Served alongside: Anthony M. Villane	Succeeded by William F. Dowd
New Jersey Senate
Preceded by Herbert J. Buehler	Member of the New Jersey Senate from the 10th district January 10, 1978–January 12, 1982	Succeeded by John F. Russo
Preceded by S. Thomas Gagliano	Member of the New Jersey Senate from the 11th district January 12, 1982–January 10, 1984	Succeeded by Frank Pallone
