= Ocean County College =

Public college in Ocean County, New Jersey, US

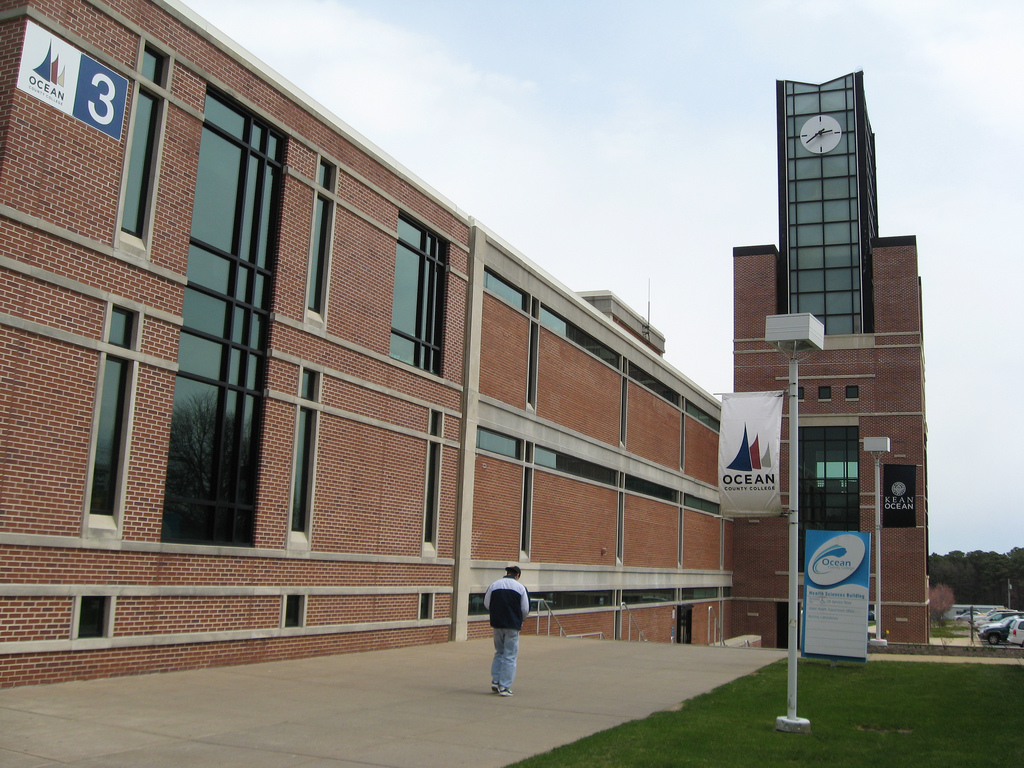
- Type: Public community college
- Established: 1964
- President: Pamela J. Monaco
- Faculty: 95 FT and 319 PT Fall 2025
- Students: 6,924 (fall 2025)
- Location: Toms River, New Jersey, United States; 40.00993°N 74.16544°W
- Nickname: Vikings
- Sporting affiliations: National Junior College Athletic Association - NJCCA
- Mascot: Vidar the Viking
- Website: www.ocean.edu

Ocean County College (OCC) is a public community college in Ocean County, New Jersey. Its main campus is in Toms River. Other locations include Manahawkin, and multiple off-campus sites throughout Ocean County.

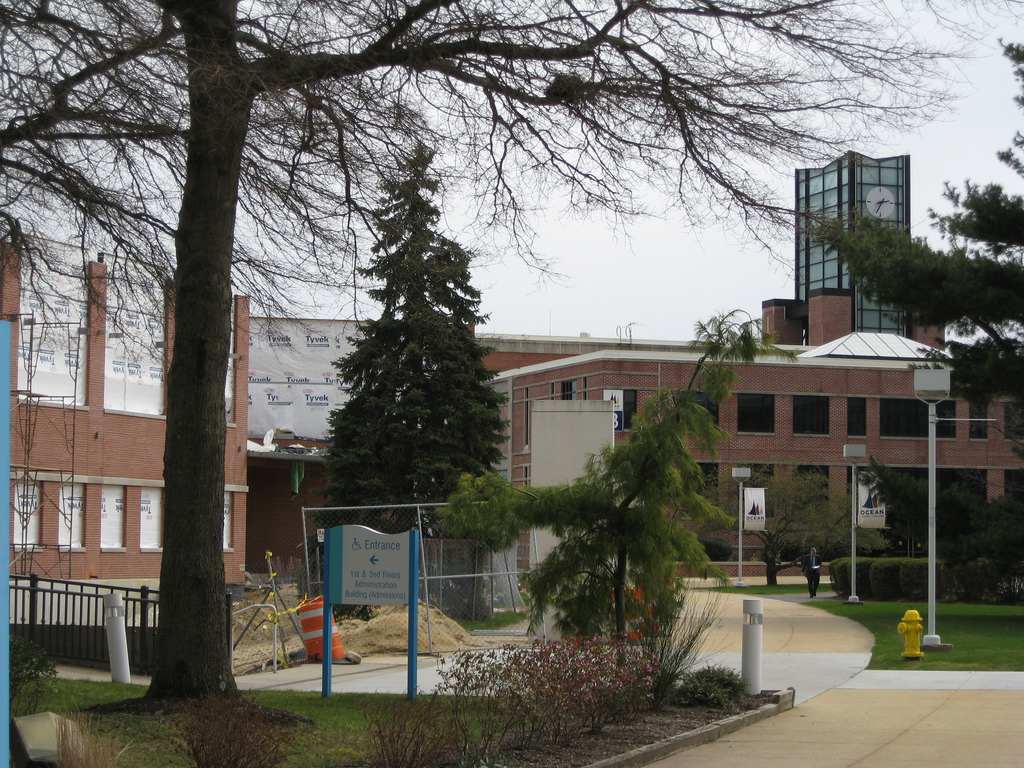
OCC campus

== History ==
In 1962, the state of New Jersey enacted the County College Act, empowering its counties to establish colleges and providing partial financial support for these colleges. Ocean County College was established by the Ocean County Board of Commissioners in January 1964 following a 1963 public referendum, and classes were first offered in the fall of 1964.

The College's president is Pamela Monaco, who took office in July 2023, succeeding Jon H. Larson.

== Academics ==
OCC offers associate degrees in science, arts, and applied science. A total of 7095 students were enrolled in the fall semester of 2024.

== Notable people ==
=== Faculty, staff and trustees ===
- Leonard Lomell (1920–2011), United States Army ranger awarded the Silver Star for gallantry in action during World War II; former trustee
- Richard O'Meara, brigadier general, United States Army; instructor

=== Alumni ===
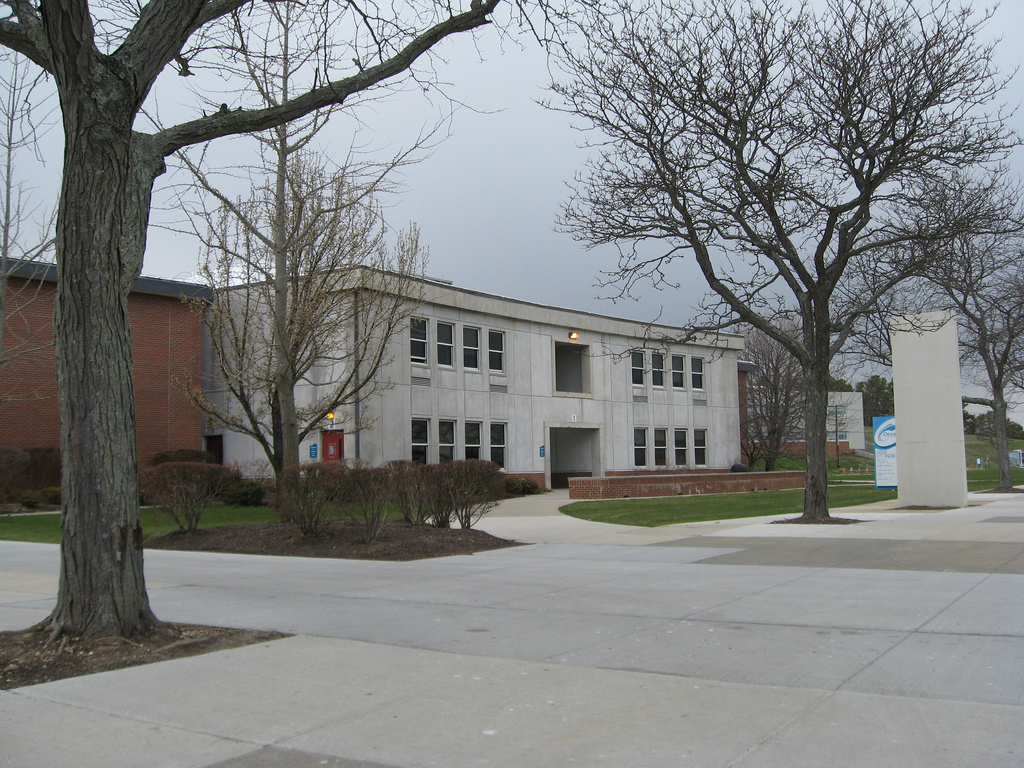
The Russell Building

- Mike Bucci (born 1972), professional wrestler
- Danny Clinch (born 1964), photographer and film director
- Virginia E. Haines (born 1946), politician who serves on the Ocean County Board of County Commissioners; served in the New Jersey General Assembly, 1992–1994; executive director of the New Jersey Lottery, 1994-2002
- Bruce Springsteen (born 1949), musician (non-graduate)

== See also ==
- New Jersey County Colleges
