= Andrew R. Ciesla =

American politician

Member of the New Jersey Senate from the 10th district
- In office 1992–2012
- Preceded by: John F. Russo
- Succeeded by: James W. Holzapfel

Personal details
- Born: July 24, 1953 (age 72)
- Party: Republican

Andrew R. Ciesla (born July 24, 1953) is an American Republican Party politician who served in the New Jersey Senate from 1992 to 2012, where he represented the 10th Legislative District. From 1994 to 1997, Ciesla was the Assistant Majority Leader in the Senate. Ciesla served on the Transportation Committee and the Environment Committee. Ciesla announced in January 2011 that he would not run for another term and would leave the Senate when his term ended in 2012.

== Career ==
From 1987 to 1991, Ciesla served on the Brick Township Council and he was President of the Council from 1989 to 1990. Ciesla was a delegate to the 1992 Republican National Convention.

Born and raised in Point Pleasant, New Jersey, Ciesla graduated from Point Pleasant Borough High School in 1971. He graduated with a B.A. from Montclair State University majoring in Political Science and was awarded an M.P.A. from Syracuse University. He has three sons: Alex, Andrew, and Adam Ciesla.

In January 2011, Ciesla announced that he would not run for re-election in November, saying that 20 years in office "seemed to me the amount of time to dedicate to public service" given how much he had accomplished.

Ciesla stated that "it's time to pass the torch", expecting the district's two representatives in the New Jersey General Assembly, James W. Holzapfel and David W. Wolfe, to pursue his vacant seat in the Senate. Holzapfel won the nomination and retained the seat for the Republicans in the November 2011 general election, defeating Democrat Charles Tivenan by a 64%-36% margin.
