= John Paul Doyle =

American Democratic Party politician

John Paul Doyle (born November 24, 1942) is an American Democratic Party politician who served as Majority Leader of the New Jersey General Assembly. Born in Newark, he was a 1964 graduate of Rutgers University and Rutgers Law School. He was elected to the State Assembly in 1973, and re-elected in 1975, 1977, 1979, 1981, 1983, 1985, 1987 and 1989, representing Ocean County. He was the Majority Leader from 1982 to 1986.

A resident of Brick Township, he was the Democratic candidate for State Senate in 1991. He lost to Republican Andrew R. Ciesla by a 62%-38% margin. Doyle served as Municipal Attorney for Brick, South Toms River and Pine Beach.
