= 1976 New Jersey Republican presidential primary =

1976 New Jersey Republican presidential primaries
- June 8, 1976
- Presidential delegate primary

67 Republican National Convention delegates

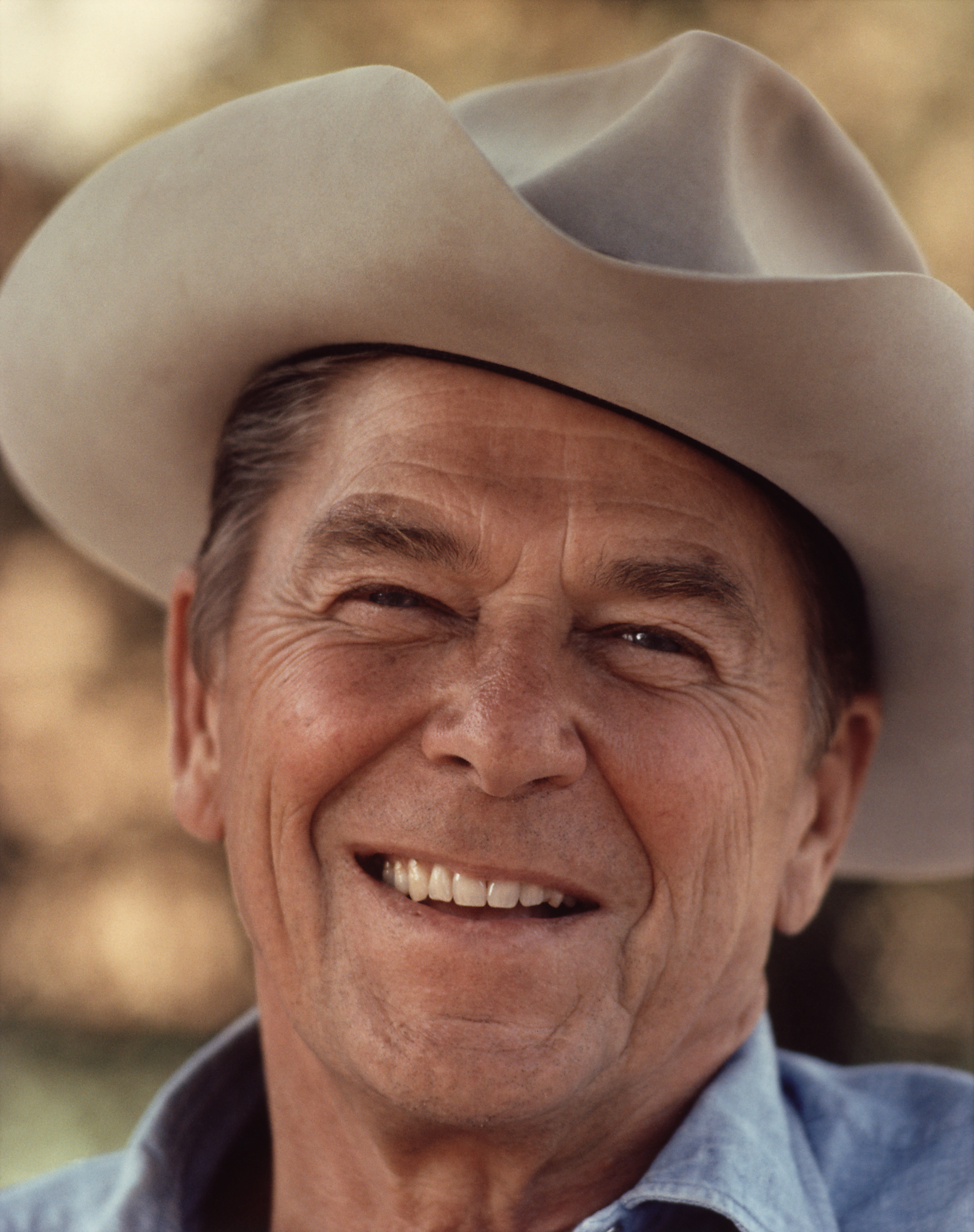
Candidate	Uncommitted (supported Gerald Ford)	Ronald Reagan
Home state		California
Delegate count	67	0
Popular vote	860,087	207,236
Percentage	80.6%	19.4%
- Presidential preference primary (non-binding)

No Republican National Convention delegates
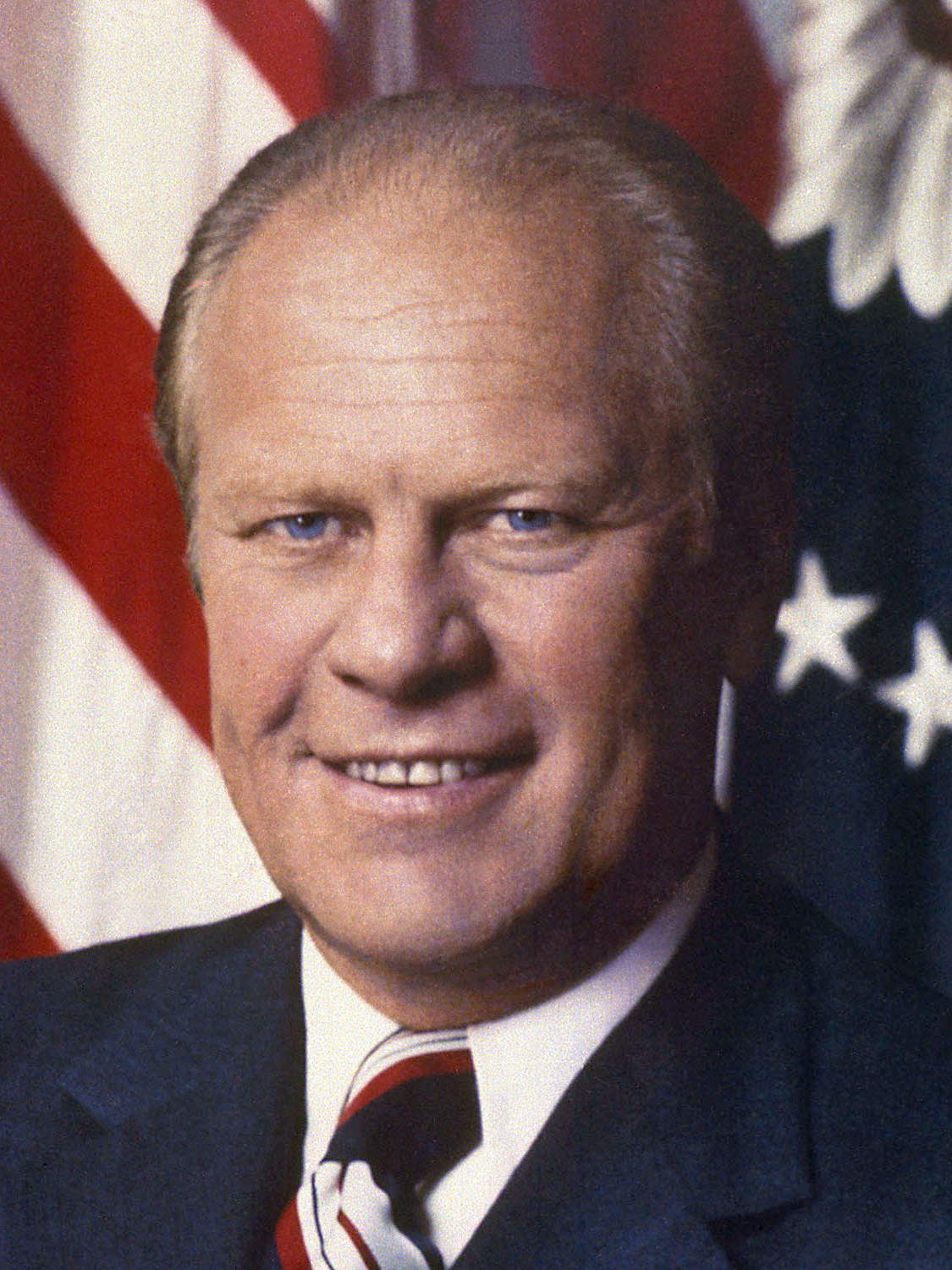
Candidate	Gerald Ford
Home state	Michigan
Popular vote	242,122
Percentage	100.0%

The 1976 New Jersey Republican presidential primary was held on June 8, 1976, in New Jersey as one of the Republican Party's statewide nomination contests ahead of the 1976 United States presidential election.

In the binding delegate primary, uncommitted delegates endorsed by the state and county parties, who supported incumbent Gerald Ford swept the statewide contest and congressional district races against delegate slates pledged to former California governor Ronald Reagan. However, Reagan publicly disclaimed the delegates (who therefore could not legally use his name), and his campaign refused to send any money into the state, effectively conceding the delegation to Ford in advance.

In the non-binding preference primary, Ford was the only candidate on the ballot.

In combination with the Democratic primary held the same day, a higher percentage of eligible voters (28.1%) cast a ballot in the 1976 primaries than in any presidential year since 1952 (39%).

== Background ==
Reagan was supported in New Jersey by a grassroots initiative; the Reagan campaign refused to enter his name into the statewide preference primary and instead focused their efforts on the California and Ohio primaries on the same day, effectively conceding to Ford in the state. Many of the Reagan delegates entered the race at the eleventh hour, filing only minutes before the April 29 deadline.

=== Procedure ===
In 1976, seven delegates were elected on a statewide slate and four delegates were elected individually from each of the state's fourteen congressional districts.

== Candidates ==
- Gerald Ford, incumbent president since 1974
- Ronald Reagan, former governor of California

== Endorsements ==
Gerald Ford

State legislators

- Thomas Kean, assemblyman from New Jersey's 25th legislative district and former speaker of the New Jersey General Assembly (ran for delegate at-large; uncommitted)

Individuals

- Richard B. Sellars, chairman and CEO of Johnson & Johnson (ran for district delegate; uncommitted)
Uncommitted

U.S. congressmembers

- Clifford Case, U.S. senator from New Jersey since 1955 (ran for delegate at-large)
- Millicent Fenwick, U.S. representative from New Jersey's 5th congressional district (ran for delegate at-large)
- Peter Frelinghuysen Jr., former U.S. representative from New Jersey's 5th congressional district (ran for district delegate)
- Matt Rinaldo, U.S. representative from New Jersey's 12th congressional district (ran for delegate at-large)
- Charles W. Sandman Jr., former U.S. representative from New Jersey's 2nd congressional district (ran for delegate at-large)

State executive branch officials

- Herbert J. Heilmann, former executive director of the New Jersey Office of Consumer Protection and assemblyman from New Jersey's 9th legislative district (ran for alternate at-large)

State legislators

- Joseph Azzolina, former state senator from New Jersey's 5th legislative district (ran for district alternate)
- Brian T. Kennedy, assemblyman from New Jersey's 10th legislative district (ran for district delegate
- Albert W. Merck, former assemblyman (ran for district delegate)
- Marie Sheehan Muhler, assemblywoman from New Jersey's 11th legislative district (ran for district alternate)
- Richard R. Stout, former state senator (ran for district delegate)
- John L. White, former state senator (ran for district delegate)

Local officials

- John K. Rafferty, mayor of Hamilton (ran for district delegate)

Party officials

- Benjamin Danskin, chair of the Monmouth County Republican Party (ran for delegate at-large)
- John E. Dimon, former chair of the New Jersey Republican Party and Burlington County Republican Party (ran for district alternate)
- Webster B. Todd, chair of the New Jersey Republican Party (ran for delegate at-large)

Individuals

- Aubrey Lewis (ran for alternate at-large)
- William F. Dowd, New Jersey Senate parliamentarian and former aide to President Richard Nixon (ran for alternate at-large)
- Charles W. Roll Jr., advisor to Nelson Rockefeller (ran for district delegate)

== Campaign ==
The party delegate slate, which was formally uncommitted and publicly for President Ford, was led by U.S. senator Clifford P. Case at Case's own insistence, over the objections of party chair Webster B. Todd. The New York Times reported that the statewide delegate slate was secretly in favor of a nominee more liberal than Ford, such as vice president Nelson Rockefeller.

Lacking official sanction from the Reagan campaign, the insurgents claimed his support regardless. “Of course, Governor Reagan is behind us,” said one statewide delegate candidate. “He just can't say so publicly.” Because they could not use his name, they appeared on the ballot as candidates on the "Former Calif. Governor for President" ticket.

According to The New York Times, state leadership characterized the Reagan delegates as a "rightwing guerrilla attack on President Ford, Vice President Rockefeller, Secretary of State Henry Kissinger, and Senator Clifford P. Case, not necessarily in that order." Under the county line system, the Republican organizations developed ballots with the Reagan slates listed in remote columns.

The Reagan organizers were not professional politicians, with even the most conservative elected officials avoiding a campaign against the entire state establishment. Former representative Charles W. Sandman Jr., who had a reputation as a leading conservative in the state, openly expressed his fear that a Reagan nomination would result in a Democratic landslide in the style of the 1964 election.

== Results ==
=== Preference primary results ===
1976 New Jersey presidential preference primary
Party	Candidate	Votes	%
Republican	Gerald Ford (incumbent)	242,122	100.00%
Total votes		242,122	100.00%

=== Delegate primary results ===
Delegate slate	Candidate	Delegate candidates		Delegates		Aggregate votes	
Delegate slate	Candidate	Statewide	District	Total	Of total (%)	Total	Of total (%)
Uncommitted	—N/a	8	66	67	100.0	858,611	80.45
Former Calif. Governor for President	Ronald Reagan	7	33	0	0.00	207,236	19.42
For the President	Gerald Ford	0	1	0	0.00	1,476	0.14
Total		15	100	67	100.0	1,067,323	100.00
Registered voters, and turnout							

==== Delegate primary results by contest ====
1976 New Jersey Republican primary
Contest	Delegates and popular vote				
Contest	Uncommitted (Note: Uncommitted totals in the district elections are the totals of the top four uncommitted delegate candidates; i.e., the establishment slate. Additional delegate candidates are listed under "other".)	Reagan	Ford	Other	Total
Delegates at-large	7; 1,519,779 (71.34%)	586,132 (27.51%)	–	24,552 (1.15%)	2,130,463
1st district	4; 35,249 (59.40%)	22,289 (37.56%)	–	1,805 (3.04%)	59,343
2nd district	4; 108,610 (93.35%)	–	–	8,106 (6.95%)	116,716
3rd district	4; 78,760 (93.41%)	5,557 (6.59%)	–	–	84,317
4th district	4; 25,086 (61.66%)	–	–	15,596 (38.34%)	40,682
5th district	4; 103,450 (74.45%)	33,182 (22.38%)	–	2,316 (1.67%)	138,948
6th district	4; 78,887 (70.25%)	33,405 (29.75%)	–	–	112,292
7th district	4; 82,351 (73.69%)	29,403 (26.31%)	–	–	111,754
8th district	4; 33,875 (100.00%)	–	–	–	33,875
9th district	4; 49,376 (97.10%)	–	1,476 (2.90%)	–	50,852
10th district	4; 9,881 (73.94%)	3,483 (26.06%)	–	–	13,364
11th district	4; 51,738 (72.41%)	19,711 (27.59%)	–	–	71,449
12th district	4; 61,431 (74.32%)	21,223 (25.68%)	–	–	82,654
13th district	4; 79,128 (66.99%)	38,983 (33.01%)	–	–	118,111
14th district	4; 13,223 (100.00%)	–	–	–	13,223
15th district	4; 19,743 (100.00%)	–	–	–	19,743
District subtotal	67 830,788 (77.84%)	207,236 (19.42%)	1,476 (0.14%)	27,823 (2.61%)	1,067,323

== Aftermath ==
Ultimately, the New Jersey delegation was split at the 1976 national convention; Ford won 63 delegates while Reagan won four.

== See also ==
- 1976 New Jersey Democratic presidential primary
