= 1976 New Jersey Democratic presidential primary =

1976 New Jersey Democratic presidential primaries
- June 8, 1976
- Presidential delegate primary

108 Democratic National Convention delegates 91 elected by voters 17 elected proportionally by initial delegates

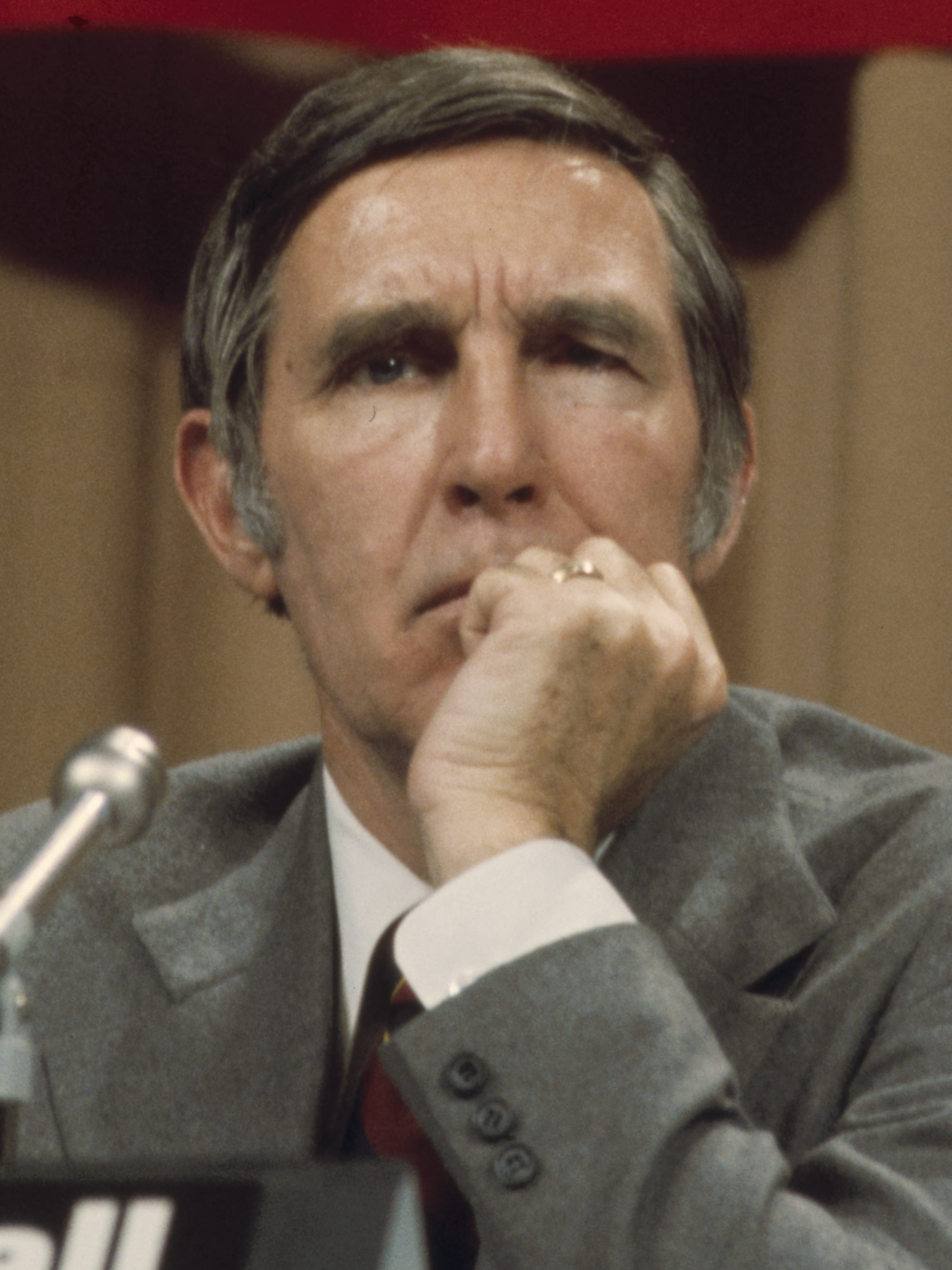

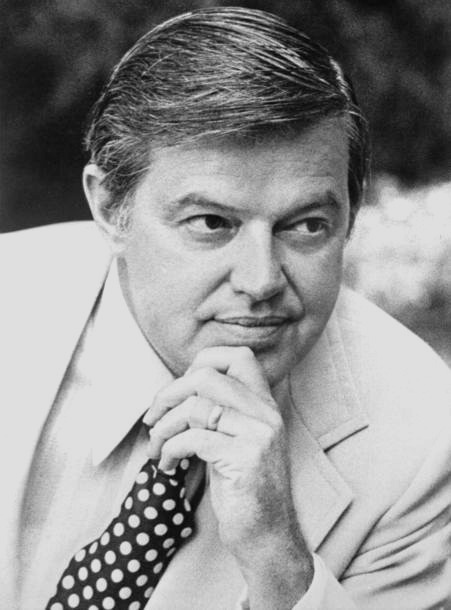

Candidate	Uncommitted	Jimmy Carter	Mo Udall
Home state		Georgia	Arizona
Delegate count	87	21	0
Popular vote	199,796	132,585	59,933
Percentage	42.3%	28.1%	12.7%
Candidate	Frank Church	George Wallace
Home state	Idaho	Alabama
Delegate count	0	0
Popular vote	31,052	28,614
Percentage	6.6%	6.1%
- Presidential preference primary (non-binding)

No Democratic National Convention delegates

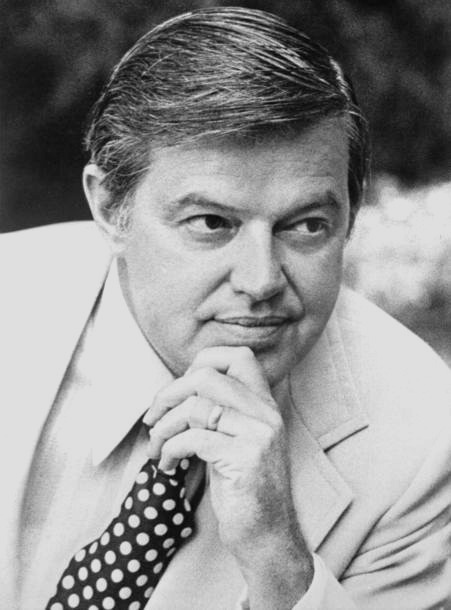

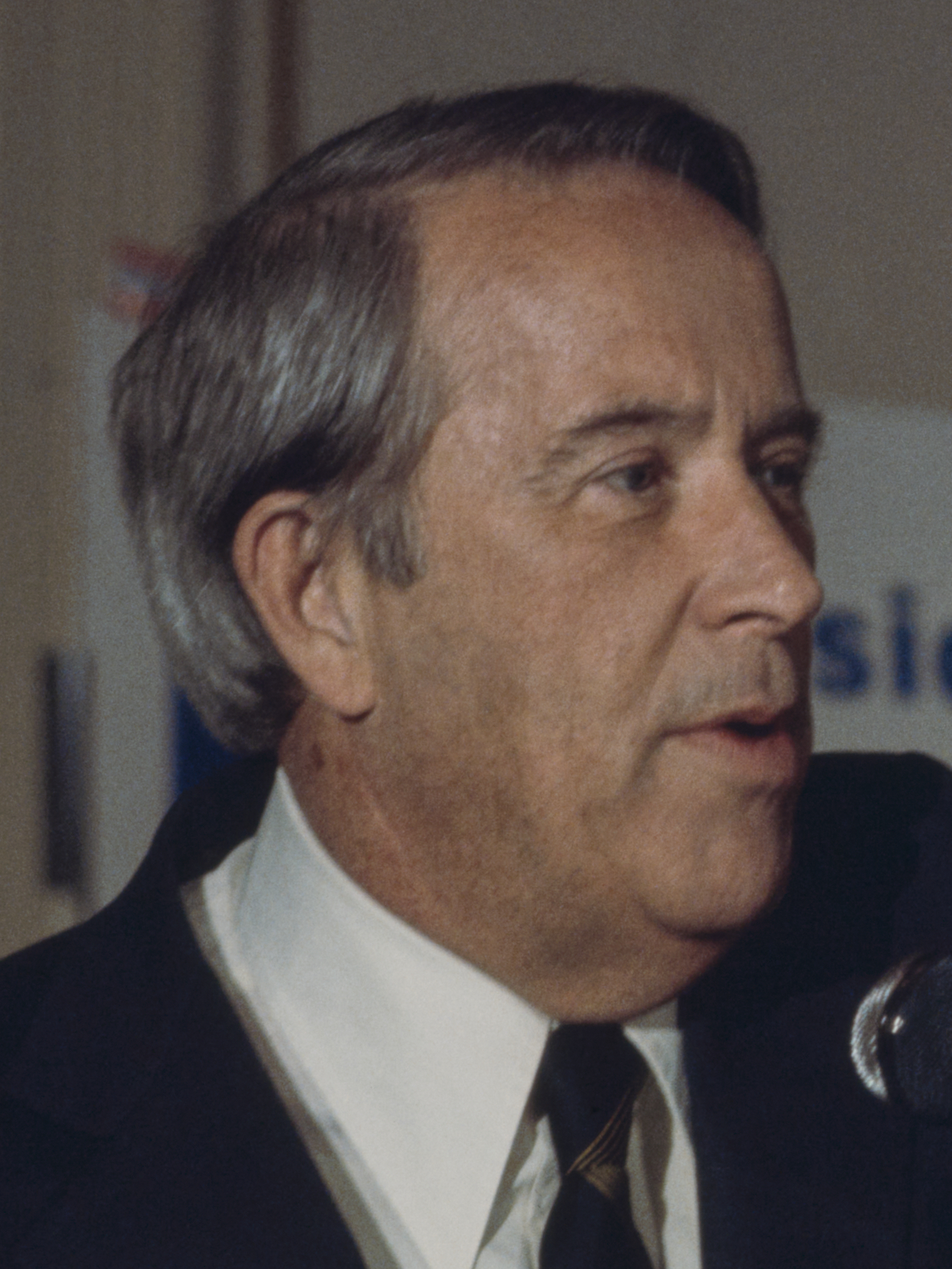

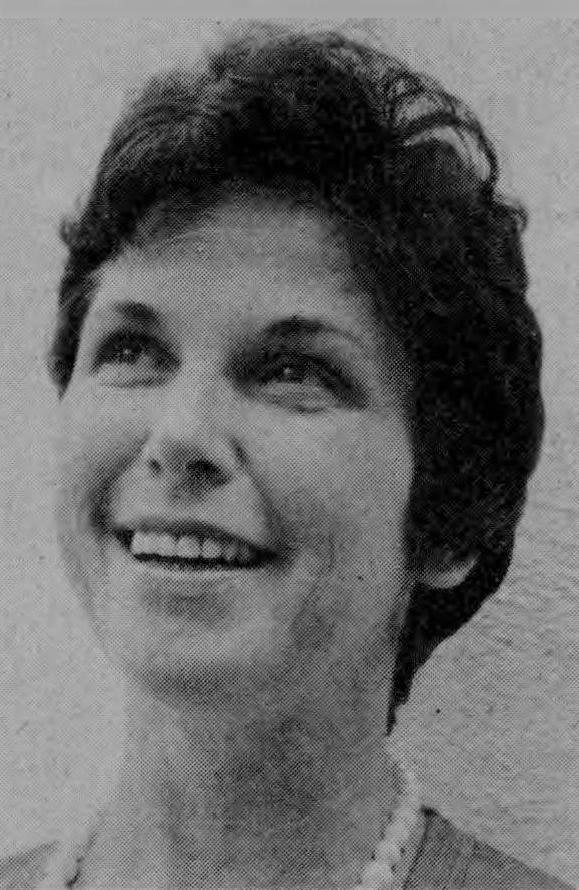
Candidate	Jimmy Carter	Frank Church	Henry M. Jackson (withdrew)
Home state	Georgia	Idaho	Washington
Popular vote	210,655	49,034	31,820
Percentage	58.4%	13.6%	8.8%
Candidate	George Wallace	Ellen McCormack
Home state	Alabama	New York
Popular vote	31,183	21,774
Percentage	8.6%	6.0%

The 1976 New Jersey Democratic presidential primary was held on June 6, 1976, in New Jersey as one of the Democratic Party's statewide nomination contests ahead of the 1976 United States presidential election.

In the binding delegate primary, a slate of ten uncommitted delegates won the statewide contest and uncommitted delegates won a large majority of the delegates elected at the legislative district level. Of the declared candidates, only Jimmy Carter won any delegates by capturing pluralities in several districts.

In the non-binding preference primary, Carter won a narrow majority over fractured opposition.

617,266 ballots were cast, breaking the record for a Democratic primary in New Jersey set in 1972, and in combination with the Republican primary held the same day, a higher percentage of eligible voters (28.1%) cast a ballot in the 1976 primaries than in any presidential year since 1952 (39%).

== Background ==
=== Primary campaign ===
Throughout the spring, Jimmy Carter began winning a series of state primaries, leading the opposition to consolidate into a "Stop Carter" movement dedicated to denying him a majority of the pledged delegates and forcing a brokered convention. In March, Governor of California Jerry Brown and U.S. Senator Frank Church entered the race and won a combined eight states. With the latest filing deadline in the nation, April 29, New Jersey became the focus of the Stop Carter movement.

Many influential party leaders sought to draft Hubert Humphrey into the New Jersey primary against Carter. The Eagleton Institute of Politics poll released on April 23 showed that Humphrey would be the first choice of sixty-one percent of New Jersey Democratic primary voters if he entered the race; without Humphrey in the race, Carter led George Wallace and Scoop Jackson with a significant plurality of the vote. Many expected Humphrey to enter the race if Carter lost the Pennsylvania primary on April 27. However, Carter won Pennsylvania by twelve percent of the vote, and Humphrey declined to run in New Jersey in a televised news conference on the day of the filing deadline. (He would ultimately decline to be drafted altogether.)

Jerry Brown, who would benefit from the uncommitted slate if Humphrey remained out of the race, also chose not to enter his name into the New Jersey primary.

=== Procedure ===
In the 1972 Democratic primary, delegates had been elected on a statewide and county basis. In 1976, ten delegates were elected on a statewide slate and two delegates were elected individually from each of the state's forty districts, with the exception of the 37th district, which elected three delegates because it had the highest voter turnout in the state in 1973 and 1974. Each district also elected one alternate delegate. Seventeen more delegates would be chosen later by the elected delegates, apportioned by the proportional vote for each of the candidates.

== Candidates ==
- Jimmy Carter, former governor of Georgia
- Frank Church, U.S. senator from Idaho
- Jesse Gray, former New York state assemblyman (preference primary only)
- John S. Gonas, former chief judge of the Indiana Appellate Court (preference primary only)
- Frank Lomento, pretzel vendor and perennial candidate (preference primary only)
- Floyd L. Lunger, Mansfield Township carpenter (preference primary only)
- Ellen McCormack, chair of the New York State Right to Life Party
- Ray Rollinson, Columbia business machine salesman (preference primary only)
- Mo Udall, U.S. representative from Arizona (delegate primary only)
- George Wallace, governor of Alabama

=== Withdrew ===
- Fred R. Harris, U.S. senator from Oklahoma (delegate candidates in 27th district only)
- Henry M. Jackson, U.S. senator from Washington

=== Declined ===
- Jerry Brown, Governor of California
- Hubert Humphrey, U.S. senator from Minnesota and former Vice President of the United States

== Endorsements ==
Jimmy Carter

State executive branch officials

- Brendan Byrne, governor of New Jersey

State legislators

- Paul Contillo, assemblyman (ran for district delegate)
- John Paul Doyle, assemblyman (ran for delegate at-large)
- Raymond Garramone, state senator (ran for district delegate)
- Kenneth Gewertz, assemblyman (ran for delegate at-large)
- Anne Clark Martindell, state senator (ran for delegate at-large)
- Anthony Scardino, state senator (ran for delegate at-large)
- S. Howard Woodson, Speaker of the General Assembly (ran for delegate at-large)

Local officials

- Mildred Barry, president of the East Orange School District Board of Education (ran for district delegate)
- William Brooks, mayor of Rutherford (ran for district delegate)
- Henry Cioffi, mayor of Long Branch (ran for district delegate)
- Joan Lessemann, Bergen County Freeholder (ran for at-large delegate)
- John Mollozzi, Union County Freeholder (ran for district delegate)
- Thomas Muccifori, former Ocean County Superior Court judge
- Dennis L. Riley, assistant Camden County counsel and municipal prosecutor (ran for district delegate)
- Joseph J. Roberts, member of the Bellmawr School District Board of Education (ran for district alternate)

Party officials

- Nancy Hobart, New Jersey Democratic Party committee member and great-granddaughter of Vice President Garret Hobart
- Harry Lerner, Essex County Democratic chair (switched endorsement from uncommitted)

Individuals

- Peter C. Eagler, Fairleigh Dickinson University student (ran for district alternate)
- Randall K. Filer, Princeton University graduate economics student (ran for district alternate)
- Alfonso Roman, president of the Puerto Rican Congress of New Jersey (ran for at-large delegate)
- Howard Rosen, lawyer and fundraiser (ran for at-large delegate)
- Alfred Wurf, president of the New Jersey AFSCME (ran for at-large delegate)
Frank Church

Local officials

- Michael J. Matthews, former Atlantic County Freeholder (ran for district delegate)

Individuals

- John C. Beale, Princeton University public administration graduate student (ran for district alternate)
Scoop Jackson (withdrew)

State executive branch officials

- Arthur J. Sills, former Attorney General of New Jersey (ran for at-large delegate)

State legislators

- Alene Ammond, state senator (ran for at-large delegate)

Local officials

- William Brooks, mayor of Rutherford (ran for district delegate)
- Larrie West Stalks, Essex County Register

Individuals

- Vincent DeMarco, Johns Hopkins University student (ran for district delegate)
- Martin Fox, former candidate for U.S. House (ran for at-large delegate)
- ~~Charles Marciante, president of the New Jersey AFL-CIO (ran for at-large delegate)~~ (switched endorsement to uncommitted)
- Martin J. Silverstein, Rutgers University student (ran for district delegate)
Mo Udall

U.S. congressmembers

- James J. Howard, U.S. representative for New Jersey's 3rd congressional district (ran for delegate at-large)

State legislators

- Eldridge Hawkins, assemblyman (ran for district delegate)
- Herbert M. Gladstone, former assemblyman (ran for district delegate)
- William H. Hicks, former assemblyman (ran for district alternate)
- Gordon MacInnes, former assemblyman (ran for district delegate)

Individuals

- Bill Bradley, New York Knicks basketball player (ran for delegate at-large)
- Lewis J. Paper, Newark attorney and former legislative counsel for U.S. senator Gaylord Nelson (ran for district alternate)
- Joe F. Vitale (ran for district delegate)
Ellen McCormack

Individuals

- Chris Smith, campaign manager for Stephen J. Foley (ran for district delegate)
Uncommitted

U.S. congressmembers

- Harrison A. Williams, U.S. senator (ran for delegate at-large)
- Dominick V. Daniels, U.S. representative for New Jersey's 14th congressional district

State legislators

- William J. Bate, assemblyman (ran for district delegate)
- George H. Barbour, assemblyman (ran for district delegate)
- Gertrude Berman, former assemblywoman (ran for district delegate)
- Albert Burstein, assemblyman (ran for delegate at-large)
- Frank J. Dodd, state senator (ran for district delegate)
- James P. Dugan, state senator (ran for district delegate)
- Bernard J. Dwyer, state senator (ran for district delegate)
- Angelo Errichetti, state senator and mayor of Camden (ran for district delegate)
- Matthew Feldman, state senator and President of the New Jersey Senate
- Francis J. Gorman, assemblyman (ran for district delegate)
- William J. Hamilton, assemblyman (ran for district delegate)
- Joseph A. Maressa, state senator (ran for district delegate)
- Harold Martin, assemblyman (ran for district delegate)
- Francis J. McManimon, assemblyman (ran for district delegate)
- Joseph P. Merlino, state senator (ran for district delegate)
- Alexander J. Menza, state senator (ran for district delegate)
- William Musto, state senator and mayor of Union City (ran for district delegate)
- Daniel F. Newman, assemblyman (ran for district delegate)
- Bill Perkins, assemblyman (ran for district delegate)
- John J. Sinsimer, former assemblyman (ran for district delegate)
- H. Donald Stewart, assemblyman (ran for district delegate)
- John A. Sweeney, assemblyman (ran for district delegate)
- Richard Van Wagner, assemblyman (ran for district delegate)
- Robert Wilentz, former assemblyman
- Charles B. Yates, assemblyman (ran for district delegate)
- Raymond Zane, state senator (ran for district delegate)

Local officials

- John Callahan, member of the Washington Township Council (ran for district delegate)
- Steve Cappiello, mayor of Hoboken (ran for district alternate)
- Donald S. Coburn, member of the Livingston Township Council (ran for district delegate)
- Dennis Collins, mayor of Bayonne
- Robert Gasser, Ocean County Freeholder (ran for district delegate)
- Kenneth A. Gibson, mayor of Newark
- Paul T. Jordan, mayor of Jersey City (ran for delegate at-large)
- Arthur John Holland, mayor of Trenton (ran for delegate at-large)
- Joan Masel, president of the Paramus Township Council (ran for district delegate)
- Lori Mooney, Atlantic County Clerk (ran for at-large delegate)
- Peter Mocco, mayor of North Bergen (ran for district delegate)
- Randy Primas, president of the Camden City Council (ran for district delegate)
- Anthony E. Russo, mayor of Union Township (ran for district delegate)
- William Simon, Camden County Freeholder
- Joseph Simunovich, Hudson County Freeholder (ran for district delegate)
- Marian W. Smith, member of the Parsippany Council (ran for district delegate)
- Donald Kofi Tucker, member of the Newark Municipal Council (ran for district delegate)
- Ronald Yuswack, member of the Wallington Township Council (ran for district delegate)

Party officials

- ~~Harry Lerner, Essex County Democratic chair~~ (switched endorsement to Carter)
- Nicholas Venezia, Middlesex County Democratic chair

Individuals

- Clara Allen, area director of the Communication Workers of America (ran for at-large delegate)
- Paul Bontempo, son of former party chair Salvatore A. Bontempo
- Charles Marciante, president of the New Jersey AFL-CIO (ran for at-large delegate) (switched endorsement from Jackson)
- Barbara McConnell, campaign manager for Helen Stevenson Meyner (ran for delegate at-large)

== Campaign ==
Prior to Humphrey's decision not to run, state party chairman and state senator James P. Dugan began organizing a slate of delegates to support his candidacy. After his decision, the slate remained uncommitted and were joined by other Carter opponents, including U.S. senator Harrison A. Williams, Middlesex County chair Nicholas Venezia, Essex County chair Harry Lerner, Peter Rodino, and Paul T. Jordan.

The uncommitted campaign recruited recognizable state and local leaders and state legislators to stand as delegate candidates, with the expectation that they would support Humphrey, Brown, or any candidate other than Carter at the convention. The uncommitted campaign gained further momentum after Scoop Jackson withdrew on May 1, following his defeat in Pennsylvania. Many of his delegate candidates also withdrew from the race and endorsed the uncommitted slate.

The growing uncommitted slate undermined Governor Brendan Byrne, who had recruited delegate candidates for Carter and endorsed him on April 29. On May 6, Byrne stoked controversy by ordering Commissioner of Community Affairs Patricia Sheehan to fire Daniel Horgan, an uncommitted delegate candidate who had helped Dugan organize the slate. The same day, Byrne met Carter at Newark Airport and spoke on his behalf, but did not join Carter at an East Brunswick fundraiser.

== Results ==
Carter won the preference primary by a wide margin over Church and Jackson, whose name remained on the ballot even though his delegate slate did not. He carried all twenty-one counties in the state.

In the delegate primary, the at-large uncommitted slate beat the Carter slate by a margin of over 67,000 votes, winning 73 delegates overall while Carter took just 18. The Carter slate carried several counties, but in the district races in the same counties, popular Democratic legislators and local officials won several slots.

=== Preference primary results ===
1976 New Jersey presidential preference primary
Party	Candidate	Votes	%
Democratic	Jimmy Carter	210,655	58.40%
Democratic	Frank Church	49,034	13.59%
Democratic	Henry M. Jackson (withdrew)	31,820	8.82%
Democratic	George Wallace	31,183	8.64%
Democratic	Ellen McCormack	21,774	6.04%
Democratic	Floyd L. Lunger	3,935	1.09%
Democratic	Jesse Gray	3,574	0.99%
Democratic	Frank Lomento	3,555	0.99%
Democratic	Ray Rollinson	3,021	0.84%
Democratic	John S. Gonas	2,288	0.63%
Total votes		360,729	100.00%

=== Delegate primary results ===
Delegate slate	Candidate	Delegate candidates		Delegates		Aggregate votes	
Delegate slate	Candidate	Statewide	District	Total	Of total (%)	Total	Of total (%)
Uncommitted	—N/a	10	95	87	80.56	523,968	42.04
Carter for President	Jimmy Carter	10	81	21	19.44	349,301	28.03
Udall for President	Mo Udall	10	80	0	0	165,108	13.25
Wallace for President	George Wallace	10	73	0	0	67,587	5.42
Church for President	Frank Church	10	58	0	0	67,059	5.38
McCormack for President	Ellen McCormack	10	64	0	0	46,389	3.72
Jackson for President	Scoop Jackson	0	51	0	0	20,875	1.67
No Slogan	—N/a	0	6	0	0	2,959	0.24
Democrat for U.N. Reform	—N/a	0	4	0	0	2,340	0.19
Harris for President	Fred Harris	0	2	0	0	716	0.06
Total		60	514	91	100.0	1,246,302	100.00
Registered voters, and turnout							

==== Delegate primary results by contest ====
Each of the forty legislative districts in New Jersey elected two delegates, with the exception of the 37th district, which elected three.

1976 New Jersey Democratic primary
Contest	Delegates and popular vote								
Contest	Uncommitted (Note: Uncommitted totals in the district elections are the totals of the top two (or three) uncommitted delegate candidates. Additional delegate candidates are listed under "other".)	Carter	Udall	Church	Jackson	Wallace	McCormack	Other	Total
Delegates at-large	7; 199,796 (42.34%)	3; 132,585 (28.10%)	59,933 (12.70%)	31,052 (6.58%)	—	28,614 (6.06%)	19,907 (4.22%)	—	471,887
1st district	6,745 (29.14%)	2; 10,136 (43.80%)	1,621 (7.00%)	1,785 (7.71%)	1,266 (5.47%)	1,022 (4.42%)	296 (1.28%)	272 (1.18%)	23,143
2nd district	1; 4,012 (33.25%)	1; 3,682 (30.51%)	1,375 (11.39%)	1,785 (14.79%)	428 (3.55%)	430 (3.56%)	355 (2.94%)	—	12,067
3rd district	2; 11,390 (51.61%)	7,343 (33.27%)	1,499 (6.79%)	—	896 (4.06%)	941 (4.26%)	—	—	22,069
4th district	2; 9,897 (48.19%)	6,187 (30.13%)	1,246 (6.07%)	1,217 (5.93%)	410 (2.00%)	1,579 (7.69%)	—	—	20,536
5th district	2; 9,851 (60.98%)	3,372 (20.87%)	1,778 (11.01%)	—	102 (0.63%)	1,051 (6.51%)	—	—	16,154
6th district	2; 7,408 (40.71%)	4,353 (23.92%)	3,091 (16.99%)	1,727 (9.49%)	—	389 (2.14%)	710 (3.90%)	519 (2.85%)	18,197
7th district	2; 9,629 (41.43%)	7,486 (32.21%)	2,382 (10.25%)	2,011 (8.65%)	—	603 (2.59%)	624 (2.68%)	508 (2.19%)	23,243
8th district	1; 5,550 (33.13%)	1; 5,772 (34.45%)	3,139 (18.74%)	—	969 (5.78%)	643 (3.84%)	680 (4.06%)	—	16,753
9th district	1; 6,658 (32.52%)	1; 6,841 (33.41%)	2,240 (10.94%)	—	2,599 (12.69%)	1,088 (5.31%)	1,048 (5.12%)	—	20,474
10th district	2; 5,646 (39.39%)	4,386 (30.60%)	2,788 (19.45%)	354 (2.47%)	—	483 (3.37%)	677 (4.72%)	—	14,334
11th district	2; 6,703 (33.67%)	5,808 (29.18%)	3,380 (16.98%)	1,176 (5.91%)	370 (1.86%)	923 (4.64%)	788 (3.96%)	759 (3.81%)	19,907
12th district	2; 7,985 (41.44%)	5,354 (27.78%)	3,110 (16.14%)	723 (3.75%)	457 (2.37%)	882 (4.58%)	759 (3.94%)	—	19,270
13th district	2; 7,539 (39.85%)	5,508 (29.11%)	2,934 (15.51%)	1,002 (5.30%)	—	873 (4.61%)	885 (4.68%)	178 (0.94%)	18,919
14th district	6,366 (26.09%)	2; 8,351 (34.23%)	6,379 (26.15%)	1,261 (5.17%)	713 (2.92%)	573 (2.35%)	755 (3.09%)	—	24,398
15th district	5,969 (31.20%)	2; 7,862 (41.10%)	1,408 (7.36%)	—	246 (1.29%)	992 (5.19%)	1,072 (5.60%)	1,581 (8.26%)	19,129
16th district	2; 5,957 (39.40%)	3,794 (25.10%)	2,029 (13.42%)	864 (5.72%)	—	1,262 (8.35%)	1,211 (8.01%)	—	15,117
17th district	2; 6,034 (35.84%)	3,467 (20.59%)	2,190 (13.01%)	774 (4.60%)	563 (3.34%)	958 (5.69%)	1,139 (6.77%)	1,710 (10.16%)	16,835
18th district	2; 12,591 (49.81%)	5,053 (19.99%)	2,222 (8.79%)	1,261 (4.99%)	1,821 (7.20%)	1,098 (4.34%)	1,234 (4.88%)	—	25,280
19th district	2; 10,212 (45.84%)	5,249 (23.56%)	3,179 (14.27%)	838 (3.76%)	703 (3.16%)	816 (3.67%)	1,052 (4.72%)	229 (1.03%)	22,278
20th district	2; 9,031 (50.19%)	3,621 (20.12%)	2,258 (12.55%)	1,837 (10.21%)	363 (2.02%)	783 (4.35%)	—	102 (0.57%)	17,995
21st district	2; 9,270 (35.97%)	6,092 (23.64%)	1,479 (5.74%)	3,794 (14.72%)	—	3,094 (12.01%)	1,298 (5.04%)	741 (2.88%)	25,768
22nd district	2; 7,245 (42.45%)	4,688 (27.49%)	2,943 (17.26%)	966 (5.67%)	147 (0.86%)	392 (2.30%)	671 (3.94%)	—	17,052
23rd district	2; 6,978 (38.40%)	5,412 (29.79%)	3,285 (18.08%)	1,237 (6.81%)	—	452 (2.49%)	696 (3.83%)	—	18,170
24th district	1; 4,844 (32.93%)	1; 4,642 (31.56%)	1,973 (13.41%)	974 (6.62%)	1,113 (7.57%)	415 (2.82%)	747 (5.08%)	—	14,708
25th district	2; 6,488 (34.08%)	4,521 (23.75%)	5,277 (27.72%)	1,168 (6.13%)	—	—	816 (4.29%)	769 (4.04%)	19,039
26th district	2; 9,917 (39.81%)	4,925 (19.77%)	5,126 (20.58%)	914 (3.67%)	1,608 (6.45%)	—	721 (2.89%)	1,699 (6.82%)	24,911
27th district	2; 6,353 (27.44%)	5,605 (24.21%)	4,876 (21.06%)	1,129 (4.88%)	1,085 (4.69%)	2,122 (9.16%)	646 (2.79%)	1,339 (5.78%)	23,155
28th district	2; 5,395 (34.05%)	3,545 (22.37%)	2,153 (13.59%)	—	—	4,050 (25.56%)	701 (4.42%)	—	15,844
29th district	1; 2,944 (33.24%)	1; 4,274 (48.26%)	1,638 (18.50%)	—	—	—	—	—	8,856
30th district	2; 7,267 (38.07%)	4,197 (21.99%)	1,322 (6.93%)	1,183 (6.20%)	634 (3.32%)	3,730 (19.54%)	—	756 (3.96%)	19,089
31st district	2; 13,325 (50.19%)	5,100 (19.21%)	2,027 (7.63%)	—	263 (0.99%)	1,531 (5.77%)	2,588 (9.75%)	1,715 (6.46%)	26,549
32nd district	2; 21,721 (61.85%)	7,721 (21.98%)	2,890 (8.23%)	—	934 (2.66%)	1,855 (5.28%)	—	—	35,121
33rd district	2; 16,702 (71.09%)	4,139 (17.62%)	1,117 (4.75%)	—	204 (0.87%)	1,332 (5.67%)	—	—	23,494
34th district	2; 7,020 (54.11%)	2,625 (20.23%)	1,381 (10.65%)	1,093 (8.43%)	204 (1.57%)	395 (3.04%)	209 (1.61%)	46 (0.35%)	12,973
35th district	2; 3,588 (36.69%)	3,269 (33.43%)	833 (8.52%)	1,086 (11.11%)	224 (2.29%)	369 (3.77%)	410 (4.19%)	—	9,779
36th district	5,326 (38.00%)	2; 5,755 (41.07%)	1,436 (10.25%)	—	—	675 (4.82%)	822 (5.87%)	—	14,014
37th district	3; 11,869 (35.50%)	9,676 (28.94%)	7,471 (22.34%)	1,701 (5.09%)	1,205 (3.60%)	670 (2.00%)	846 (2.53%)	—	33,438
38th district	4,242 (32.04%)	2; 5,142 (38.84%)	1,884 (14.23%)	650 (4.91%)	307 (2.32%)	—	486 (3.67%)	528 (3.99%)	13,239
39th district	1; 5,284 (34.30%)	1; 5,038 (32.70%)	2,595 (16.84%)	764 (4.96%)	562 (3.65%)	274 (1.78%)	889 (5.77%)	—	15,406
40th district	1; 5,785 (34.39%)	1; 5,725 (34.03%)	3,221 (19.15%)	733 (4.36%)	479 (2.85%)	228 (1.36%)	650 (3.86%)	—	16,821
District subtotal	64 316,736 (40.95%)	17 216,716 (28.02%)	105,175 (13.60%)	36,007 (4.65%)	20,875 (2.70%)	38,973 (5.04%)	26,482 (3.47%)	13,451 (1.74%)	773,524

== Aftermath ==
Ultimately, the New Jersey delegation cast its 108 votes for Carter at the 1976 Democratic National Convention. The vote came over the objection of assemblyman Francis J. Gorman, who shouted "No!" and sought to cast his vote for Jerry Brown. He was denied the right, and all votes were cast for Carter, who won the nomination with a large majority of delegate votes.
