= 1976 New Hampshire Republican presidential primary =

- February 24, 1976
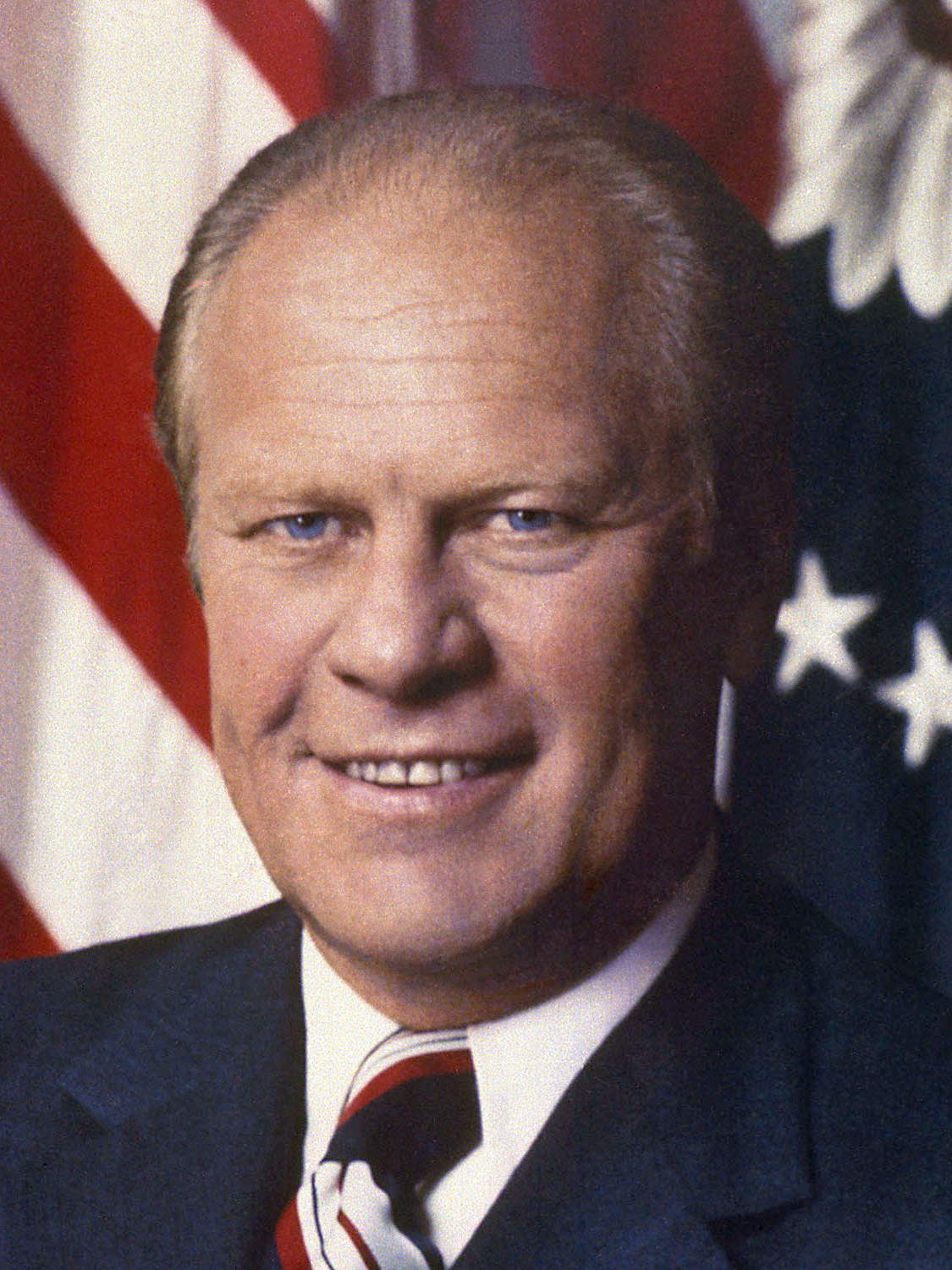

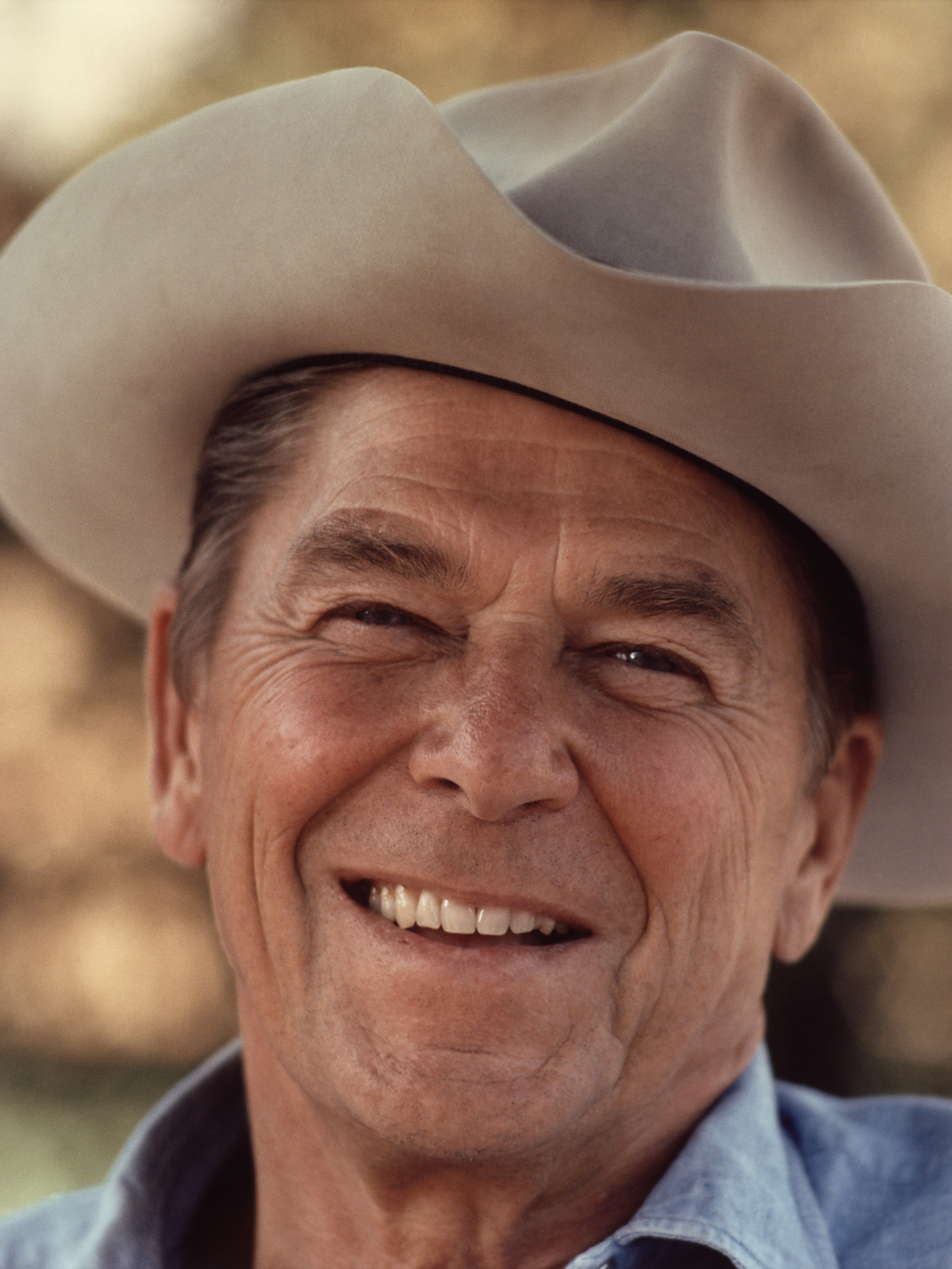
Candidate	Gerald Ford	Ronald Reagan
Home state	Michigan	California
Delegate count	18	3
Popular vote	55,156	53,569
Percentage	50.1%	48.6%
- County results Ford: 50-60% 60-70% Reagan: 50-60%

The 1976 New Hampshire Republican presidential primary was held on February 24, 1976, in New Hampshire as one of the Republican Party's statewide nomination contests ahead of the 1976 United States presidential election. Incumbent President Gerald Ford eked out a razor-thin victory over the more conservative Ronald Reagan by just 1,587 votes, or 1.5 percentage points. Ford would go on to win the nomination at the contested 1976 Republican convention, but lost to Jimmy Carter in the general election.

Results by County
Counties	Ford		Reagan		Other		Total
Counties	#	%	#	%	#	%	Total
Belknap	3,001	45.3%	3,442	52.0%	178	2.7%	6,621
Carroll	2,834	47.7%	3,031	51.0%	82	1.4%	5,947
Cheshike	5,017	59.9%	3,095	37.0%	258	3.1%	8,370
Coos	1,745	40.6%	2,448	57.0%	101	2.4%	4,294
Grafton	4,910	50.4%	4,591	47.2%	233	2.4%	9,734
Hillsborough	11,379	43.5%	14,114	53.9%	678	2.6%	26,171
Merrimack	8,111	52.8%	6,884	44.8%	378	2.5%	15,373
Rockingham	11,314	50.2%	10,604	47.0%	632	2.8%	22,550
Strafford	3,436	55.7%	3,436	41.3%	248	3.0%	8,312
Sullivan	1,924	51.5%	1,924	44.7%	164	3.8%	4,305
Total	55,156	49.4%	53,569	48.0%	2,952	2.6%	111,677
