= 1976 Republican Party presidential primaries =

- January 6 to July 14, 1976

2,259 delegates to the Republican National Convention 1,130 votes needed to win

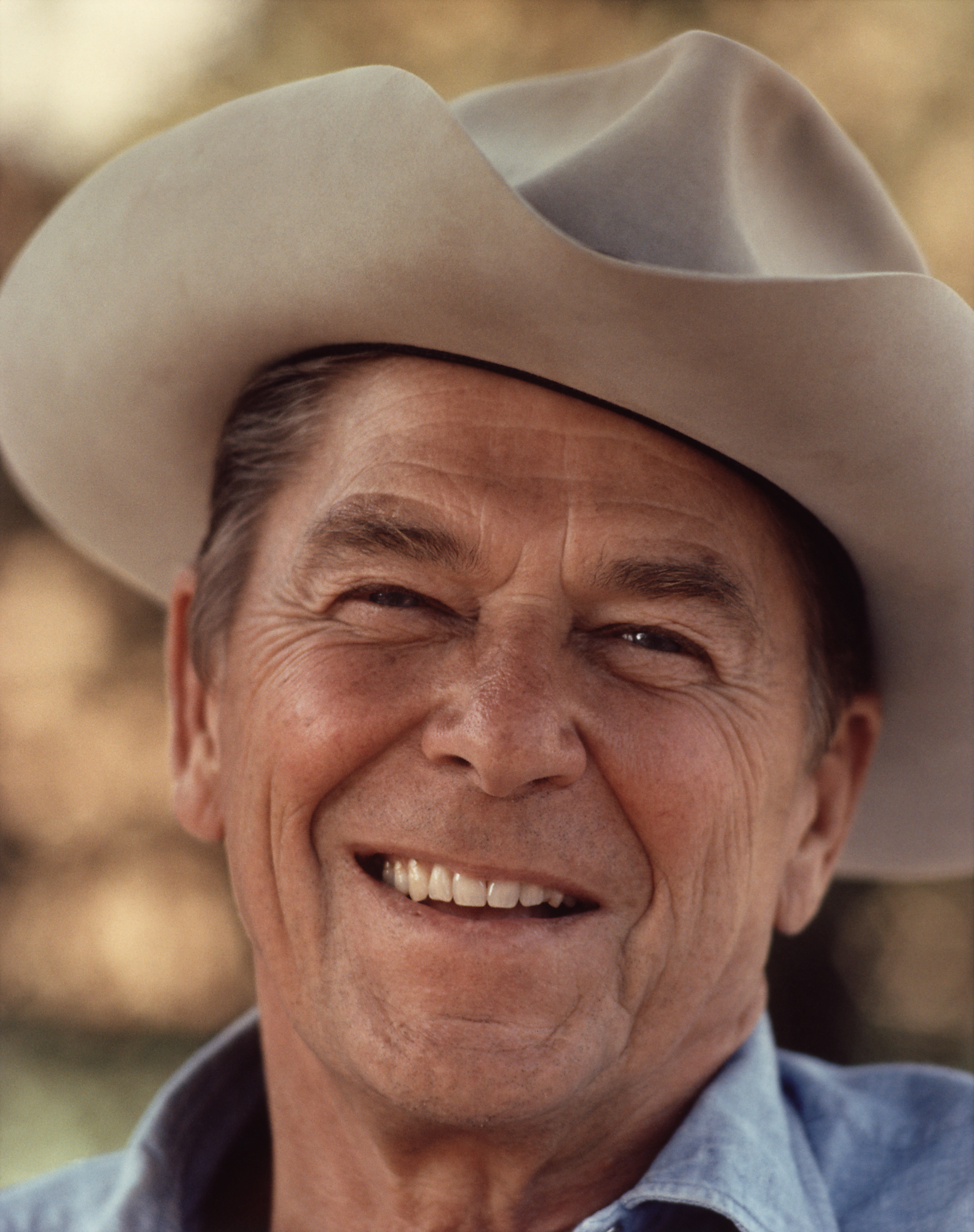
Candidate	Gerald Ford	Ronald Reagan
Home state	Michigan	California
Delegate count	1,121	1,078
Contests won	27	24
Popular vote	5,529,899	4,760,222
Percentage	53.3%	45.9%
- Ford Reagan Uncommitted
Previous Republican nominee
Richard Nixon
Republican nominee
Gerald Ford

From January 6 to July 14, 1976, voters of the Republican Party chose its nominee for president in the 1976 United States presidential election. The major candidates were incumbent President Gerald Ford and former governor of California Ronald Reagan. After a series of primary elections and caucuses, neither secured a majority of the delegates before the convention.

This was the last election in which the Republican nominee was undetermined at the start of the party's national convention.

== Background ==
=== August 1974 – February 1975: The Ford presidency begins ===
Following the Watergate scandal and resignation of President Richard Nixon, Vice President Gerald Ford was elevated to the presidency on August 9, 1974. Because Ford had been appointed vice president by Nixon following the resignation of Spiro Agnew from the position, he became the only president to assume office without having been previously elected president or vice president by the Electoral College.

On September 8, Ford's first major act in office was to grant a full and unconditional pardon for any crimes Richard Nixon might have committed against the United States while president. Following his pardon of Nixon, Ford's approval ratings among the American public dropped precipitously. Within a week, his approval rating fell from 69% to 49%, the steepest decline in history.

The economy was in dire condition upon Ford's elevation, marked by the worst peacetime inflation in American history and the highest interest rates in a century. The Dow Jones had declined 43 percent from October 1973 to September 1974. To combat inflation, Ford first proposed a tax increase and later, in response to Democratic calls for a permanent cut in taxes, a temporary moderate decrease. Reagan publicly criticized both proposals.

Race and education divided public opinion, especially over issues such as forced integration and changes to public school curriculum. Political violence over education policy broke out in Boston and Charleston, West Virginia. Abortion also became a nationally salient issue after the Supreme Court's Roe v. Wade decision, which was handed down the year prior in 1973 and struck down state restrictions on abortion nationwide.

In the 1974 midterm elections, the Democratic Party dramatically expanded its majorities in both the House and Senate. The elections were seen as a referendum on the Republican Party post-Watergate and on the political establishment more generally. Newly elected members of Congress became known as "Watergate Babies" and aggressively pursued procedural and oversight reforms.

During this period, Ronald Reagan concluded his second term in office as governor of California. His administration was marked by efforts to dismantle the welfare state and a high-profile crackdown on urban crime and left-wing dissent, especially at the University of California, Berkeley. He also led an effort to enforce the state's capital punishment laws but was blocked by the California Supreme Court in the People v. Anderson decision. After Reagan left office in January 1975, he began hosting a national radio show and writing a national newspaper column.

=== March–July 1975: Conservatives revolt and Reagan rises ===
Conservative opposition to Ford within the Republican Party began to surface in December 1974, following his appointment of New York Governor Nelson Rockefeller as vice president. For more than a decade, Rockefeller had represented the party's liberal wing, and the appointment faced immediate criticism from right-wing senators Jesse Helms, Barry Goldwater and John Tower, though Rockefeller's confirmation in the Senate was largely undeterred.

Discontent reached a fever pitch at the second annual Conservative Political Action Conference in February. Speaking there, Reagan dismissed calls to seek the presidency on a third-party ticket: "Is it a third party that we need, or is it a new and revitalized second party, raising a banner of no pale pastels, but bold colors which could make it unmistakably clear where we stand on all the issues troubling the people?" Speakers at CPAC also criticized Ford administration policy, Vice President Rockefeller, and First Lady Betty Ford's public campaign in support of abortion and the Equal Rights Amendment. In March, discussion of Reagan's presidential prospects began to grow following an appearance on The Tonight Show and a profile in Newsweek that called him "the most kinetic single presence in American political life." In defense, the administration drafted a letter of support for President Ford that received the signatures of 113 of 145 GOP representatives and 31 of 38 senators. Ford formally announced he would run for re-election on July 8.

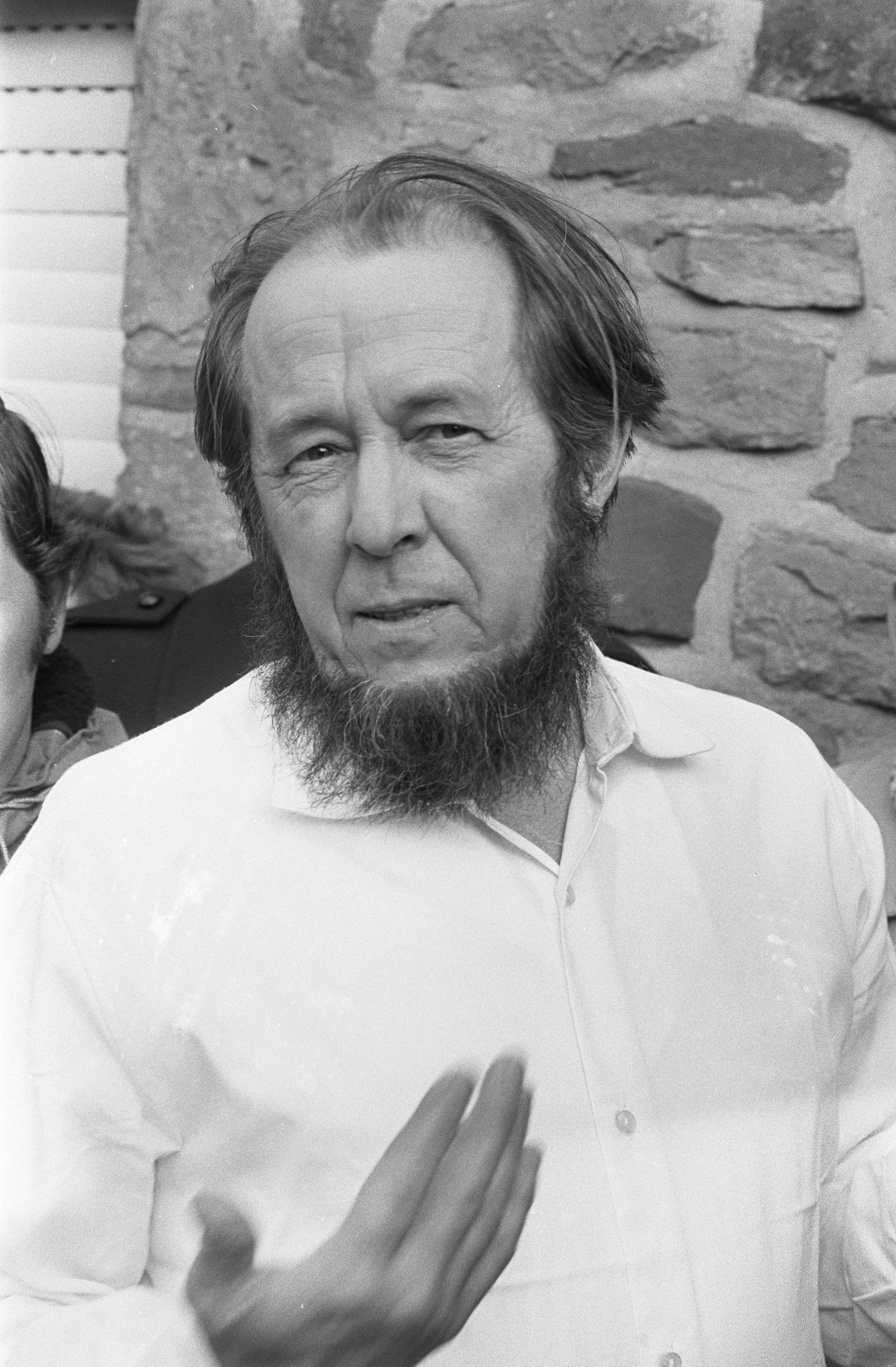
President Ford's snub of Aleksandr Solzhenitsyn drew criticism from conservative Cold War hawks, including Ronald Reagan

More than any domestic issue in 1975, foreign policy drove a wedge between the president and his conservative critics. Following the American evacuation of Saigon and the collapse of South Vietnam, these criticisms grew vociferous. On his radio show, Reagan compared the withdrawal from Saigon to the Munich Agreement and warned that it would "tempt the Soviet Union as it once tempted Hitler and the military rulers of Japan." While Ford regained some support from conservatives following the rescue of the SS Mayaguez in Cambodia, he soon drew the ire of the party's right wing with a series of foreign policy moves designed to improve relations with the Soviet Union.

First, President Ford refused to meet with Soviet dissident Aleksandr Solzhenitsyn on his visit to the United States on June 21. In response, Reagan publicly criticized Ford by name for the first time in his national newspaper column, contrasting the popular Solzhenitsyn to other guests the President had entertained in the White House, "the Strawberry Queen of West Virginia and the Maid of Cotton." The day after this column ran, Senator Paul Laxalt announced the formation of a committee named "Friends of Ronald Reagan," organized for the purpose of drafting Reagan to run for president.

Ford followed the Solzhenitsyn affair with an overseas trip to Eastern Europe, where he signed the Helsinki Accords, a treaty establishing that the current boundaries of Eastern European nations were "inviolable by force." Conservatives and anti-communists harshly criticized Ford for capitulating to Soviet demands and formally recognizing the Eastern bloc. The Wall Street Journal called the Helsinki agreement the "new Yalta." By late August, Ford's approval rating was 34%.

On September 5 in Sacramento, Ford survived the first of two attempts on his life by lone assassins. A second attempt followed on September 21. Neither assassin struck Ford.

=== September–December 1975: Reagan enters the race ===
In September, Reagan began to actively campaign in key early states. He stumped in New Hampshire for Louis Wyman in the special election for Senate and began to assemble a campaign staff led by campaign manager John Sears. He secured the endorsement of New Hampshire's conservative governor Meldrim Thomson Jr. and state party chairman, as well as support from moderate former governor Hugh Gregg.

On November 4, Vice President Nelson Rockefeller announced he would not seek nomination as Ford's running mate in 1976. That same day, Ford fired Secretary of Defense James R. Schlesinger, whose critical comments on the Helsinki summit had been leaked to the press earlier in the fall. That week, Ford traveled to Massachusetts and pledged to campaign in every primary in the nation.

On November 20, Ronald Reagan officially announced his campaign for president.

== Campaign ==
Ford narrowly defeated Reagan in the New Hampshire primary, and then won the Florida and Illinois primaries by comfortable margins. During the first six contests, Reagan followed the "eleventh commandment" he used during his initial campaign for governor of California: "Thou shalt not speak ill of any fellow Republican." By the North Carolina primary, Reagan's campaign was nearly out of money, and it was widely believed that another defeat would force him to quit the race. But with the help of U.S. Senator Jesse Helms's powerful political organization, Reagan upset Ford. Reagan had abandoned the approach of invoking the commandment and beat Ford 52% to 46%, regaining momentum.

Reagan then had a string of impressive victories, including Texas, where he won all delegates at stake in its first binding primary. Four other delegates chosen at the Texas state convention went to Reagan and the state shut out its U.S. senator, John G. Tower, who had been named to manage the Ford campaign on the convention floor. Ford bounced back to win his home state of Michigan, and from there, the two candidates engaged in an increasingly bitter nip-and-tuck contest for delegates. By the time the party's convention opened in August 1976, the race was still too close to call.

Reagan was the first candidate to win a presidential primary against an incumbent actively running for reelection since Estes Kefauver defeated Harry Truman in the 1952 New Hampshire Democratic primary. Former Texas governor John Connally speculated that Reagan's attacks weakened Ford in the general election against his opponent and eventual successor, Jimmy Carter.

== Schedule and results ==
Ford: Ford—40–50%; Ford—50–60%; Ford—60–70%; Ford—70–80%; Ford—80–90%; Ford—90–100%; Reagan: Reagan—30–40%; Reagan—40–50%; Reagan—50–60%; Reagan—60–70%; Reagan—70–80%; Reagan—80–90%; Reagan—90–100%; Tie: Tie—40–50%; Tie—50%

Date (daily totals)	Contest	Total pledged delegates	Delegates won and popular vote (Note: This should not be taken as a finalized list of results. While a significant amount of research was done, there were a number of Delegates who were not bound by the instruction, or "Pledged" to a candidate, and to simplify the data these delegates were considered "Uncommitted". Many states also held primaries for the delegate positions, and these on occasion were where slates or candidates pledge to a certain candidate might be elected; however, as these elections allowed for a single person to vote for multiple candidates, as many as the number of positions being filled, it is difficult to determine how many people actually voted in these primaries. For this reason, while the results of some are in the table, they are not included in the popular vote summaries at the bottom of the table.)			
Date (daily totals)	Contest	Total pledged delegates	Gerald Ford	Ronald Reagan	Others	Uncommitted
January 6	New York convention	37 (of 154)	–	–	–	37 (Note: Most of the uncommitted slates supported President Ford)
January 19	Iowa caucuses (Note: Iowa Republicans didn't conduct a presidential preference poll for their 1976 caucuses. The results shown are a random sampling that was only conducted in various precincts throughout the state that showed an edge for President Ford. Since delegates weren't required to declare their presidential preference, even through the district and state conventions, it was difficult to judge the breakdown of Iowa's Republican delegation until the convention)	0 (of 36)	264 (45.28%)	248 (42.54%)	9 (Note: Represents seven votes for Vice President Nelson Rockefeller, one vote for Iowa Governor Robert Ray, and one vote for Elliot Richardson.) (1.54%)	62 (10.63%)
January 31	Guam convention	4	–	–	–	4 (Note: Although all 4 of Guam's delegates were technically uncommitted, they were in favor of Ford.)
February 24	New Hampshire 111,674	21	18; 55,156 (49.39%)	3; 53,569 (47.96%)	2,949 WI (Note: Includes 591 write-in votes for Jimmy Carter, 421 write-in votes for Morris Udall, 228 write-in votes for Birch Bayh, and 225 write-in votes for Fred Harris.) (2.65%)	–
February 26	District of Columbia convention	14	14	–	–	
February 28	Iowa county conventions	3,495 CDs	1,494 CDs (42.75%)	1,494 CDs (42.75%)	–	507 CDs (14.51%)
February 29	Puerto Rico convention	8	–	–	–	8 (Note: Although all 8 of Puerto Rico's delegates were technically uncommitted, they were in favor of Ford.)
March 2	Massachusetts 188,458	43	27; 115,375 (61.22%)	15; 63,555 (33.73%)	3,519 WI (1.87%)	1; 6,009 (3.18%)
March 2	Vermont 32,158	0 (of 18)	27,014 (84.00%)	4,892 WI (15.21%)	252 WI (0.78%)	–
March 9	Florida 608,879	66	43; 321,982 (52.88%)	23; 286,897 (47.12%)	–	–
March 16	Illinois 775,893	96 (of 101)	70; 456,750 (58.87%)	13; 311,295 (40.12%)	7,848 (Note: Includes 7,582 votes for Lawrence "Lar" Daly.) (1.01%)	13
March 23	North Carolina 193,727	54	25; 88,897 (45.89%)	28; 101,468 (52.38%)	–	1; 3,362 (1.74%)
April 6	New York	117 (of 154)	–	3	–	114 (Note: 12 delegates ran as pro-Reagan but didn't have Reagan's endorsement or any support from his organization)
April 6	Wisconsin 590,418	45	41; 325,869 (55.19%)	4; 262,126 (44.40%)	–	2,423 (0.41%)
April 10	Mississippi convention	30	–	–	–	30
April 24	Arizona convention	29	2	27	–	–
April 24	Minnesota district conventions (Note: Only one of eight districts held conventions on this date.)	12 (of 42)	8	2	–	2
April 24	South Carolina convention	36	6	23	–	7 (Note: 4 delegates were leaning to Reagan)
April 24	Virgin Islands convention	3	–	–	–	3
April 27	Pennsylvania 797,358	103	733,472 (91.99%)	40,510 WI (5.08%)	23,376 WI (Note: Includes 2,543 write-in votes for Jimmy Carter, 899 write-in votes for George Wallace, and 742 write-in votes for Hubert Humphrey.) (2.93%)	103
April 30	Maine convention	20	–	–	–	20 (Note: 14 delegates were said to favor President Ford, 3 Reagan, and 1 uncommitted)
May 1	Minnesota district convention (Note: Only one of eight districts held conventions on this date.)	3 (of 42)	3	–	–	–
May 1	Texas 419,406	96 (of 100)	139,944 (33.37%)	96; 278,300 (66.36%)	–	1,162 (0.28%)
May 4	Alabama	37	–	37	–	–
May 4	Georgia 188,472	48	59,801 (31.73%)	48; 128,671 (68.27%)	–	–
May 4	Indiana 631,292	54	9; 307,513 (48.71%)	45; 323,779 (51.29%)	–	–
May 8	Kansas district conventions	15 (of 34)	11	3	–	1
May 8	Minnesota district convention (Note: Only one of eight districts held conventions on this date.)	3 (of 42)	3	–	–	–
May 8	Missouri district convention (Note: Only one of ten districts held conventions on this date.)	3 (of 49)	3	–	–	–
May 8	Oklahoma district Conventions	18 (of 36)	–	–	–	18 (Note: All 18 delegates were controlled by Reagan supporters)
May 8	Wyoming convention	17	–	–	–	17
May 9	Louisiana district conventions (Note: Only three of eight districts held conventions on this date.)	9 (of 41)	–	9	–	–
May 11	Louisiana district conventions (Note: Only two of eight districts held conventions on this date.)	6 (of 41)	–	3	–	3
May 11	Missouri district conventions (Note: Only two of ten districts held conventions on this date.)	6 (of 49)	6	–	–	–
May 11	Nebraska Pres. Primary 208,035	26	8; 94,542 (45.36%)	18; 113,493 (54.46%)	379 (0.18%)	–
May 11	West Virginia	28	88,386 (56.77%)	67,306 (43.23%)	–	28
May 15	Hawaii convention	19	–	–	–	19
May 15	Louisiana district conventions (Note: Only three of eight districts held conventions on this date.)	9 (of 41)	–	9	–	–
May 15	Minnesota district conventions (Note: Only two of eight districts held conventions on this date.)	6 (of 42)	2	2	–	2
May 15	Missouri district conventions (Note: Only seven of ten districts held conventions on this date.)	18 (of 49)	6	12	–	–
May 15	Virginia district conventions (Note: Only three of ten districts held conventions on this date.)	9 (of 51)	2	5	–	2
May 18	Maryland 165,971	43	43 (Note: While a handful of Reagan delegates were elected, by law they were required to support Ford for the first two ballots.); 96,291 (58.02%)	69,680 (41.98%)	–	–
May 18	Michigan 1,062,814	84	55; 690,187 (64.94%)	29; 364,052 (34.25%)	109 WI (0.81%)	8,473 (0.80%)
May 22	Alaska convention	19	–	–	–	19 (Note: Seventeen uncommitted delegates favorably supported President Ford.)
May 22	Kansas convention	19 (of 34)	18	1	–	–
May 22	Vermont convention	18	17	–	–	1 (Note: The uncommitted delegate favored President Ford.)
May 22	Virginia district conventions (Note: Only five of ten districts held conventions on this date.)	15 (of 51)	3	11	–	1
May 24	Virginia district convention (Note: Only one of ten districts held conventions on this date.)	3 (of 51)	–	3	–	–
May 25	Arkansas 32,541	27	10; 11,430 (35.12%)	17; 20,628 (63.39%)	–	483 (1.48%)
May 25	Idaho 89,693	17 (of 21)	4; 22,323 (24.89%)	13; 66,643 (74.30%)	–	727 (0.81%)
May 25	Kentucky 133,528	37	19; 67,976 (50.91%)	18; 62,683 (46.94%)	1,088 (Note: All votes are for Thomas W. "Tommy" Klein.) (0.82%)	1,781 (1.33%)
May 25	Nevada 47,749	18	5; 13,747 (28.79%)	13; 31,637 (66.26%)	–	2,365 (4.95%)
May 25	Oregon 298,535	31	17; 150,181 (50.30%)	13; 136,691 (45.79%)	11,662 WI (Note: Includes 8,368 write-in votes for Jerry Brown, 1,371 write-in votes for Frank Church, and 913 write-in votes for Jimmy Carter.) (3.91%)	–
May 25	Tennessee 242,543	43	21; 120,685 (49.76%)	22; 118,997 (49.06%)	97 WI (0.04%)	2,764 (1.14%)
May 29	Virginia district convention (Note: Only one of ten districts held conventions on this date.)	3 (of 51)	–	–	–	3
June 1	Montana 89,779	0 (of 20)	31,100 (34.64%)	56,683 (63.14%)	–	1,996 (2.22%)
June 1	Rhode Island 14,352	19	19; 9,365 (65.25%)	4,480 (31.21%)	–	507 (3.53%)
June 1	South Dakota 84,077	20	9; 36,976 (43.98%)	11; 43,068 (51.22%)	–	4,033 (4.79%)
June 5	Colorado district convention (Note: Only one of five districts held conventions on this date.)	3 (of 31)	–	3	–	–
June 5	Louisiana convention	17 (of 41)	–	14	–	3
June 6	Virginia convention	21 (of 51)	–	17	–	4
June 8	California 2,450,511	167	845,655 (34.51%)	167; 1,604,836 (65.49%)	20 WI (0.00%)	–
June 8	New Jersey 242,122	67	242,122 (100.00%)	–	–	67 (Note: All uncommitted delegates favorably supported President Ford.)
June 8	Ohio 965,416	97	91; 545,770 (56.53%)	6; 419,646 (43.47%)	–	–
June 12	Missouri convention	19 (of 49)	1	18	–	–
June 19	Colorado district convention (Note: Only one of five districts held conventions on this date.)	3 (of 31)	–	3	–	–
June 19	Delaware convention	17	–	–	–	17 (Note: 13 uncommitted delegates supported President Ford.)
June 19	Iowa convention	36	19	17	–	–
June 19	Texas convention	4 (of 100)	–	4	–	–
June 19	Washington convention	38	7	31	–	–
June 26	Idaho convention	4 (of 21)	–	4	–	–
June 26	Minnesota convention	18 (of 42)	17	1	–	–
June 26	Montana convention	20	6	14	–	–
June 26	New Mexico convention	21	–	21	–	–
July 8	North Dakota convention	18	–	–	–	18 (Note: 10 uncommitted delegates supported President Ford, 3 supported Ronald Reagan.)
July 9	Colorado district conventions (Note: Only three of five districts held conventions on this date.)	9 (of 31)	3	5	–	1
July 10	Colorado convention	16 (of 31)	1	15	–	–
July 17	Connecticut convention	35	35	–	–	–
July 17	Utah convention	20	–	20	–	–
2,259 delegates 10,831,604 votes			727 5,702,278 (52.64%)	933 5,036,872 (46.50%)	0 51,299 (0.47%)	566 41,155 (0.38%)
Estimated Delegate Count			1,121 (49.24%)	1,078 (47.72%)	0 (0.00%)	60 (2.66%)

== Candidates ==
This was the last time during the 20th century (and the last time to date) that a primary season had ended without a presumptive nominee.

=== Nominee ===
Candidate	Most recent office	Home state	Campaign Withdrawal date	Popular vote	Contests won	Running mate
Gerald Ford	President of the United States (1974–1977)	Michigan	(Campaign); Secured nomination: August 19, 1976	5,529,899 (53.3%)	27; IA, NH, MA, VT, FL, IL, WI, PA, WV, MD, MI, KY, OR, TN, RI, NJ, OH, ME, CT, NY, DE, MS, KS, MN, ND, AK, HI, DC	Bob Dole

=== Eliminated at convention ===
Candidate	Most recent office	Home state	Campaign Withdrawal date	Popular vote	Contests won	Running mate
Ronald Reagan	Governor of California (1967–1975)	California	(Campaign); Defeated at convention: August 19, 1976	4,760,222 (45.9%)	24; NC, TX, GA, IN, NE, AR, ID, NV, MT, SD, CA, VA, SC, AL, LA, MO, OK, NM, CO, WY, AZ, UT, WA	Richard Schweiker

=== Candidates who declined to run ===
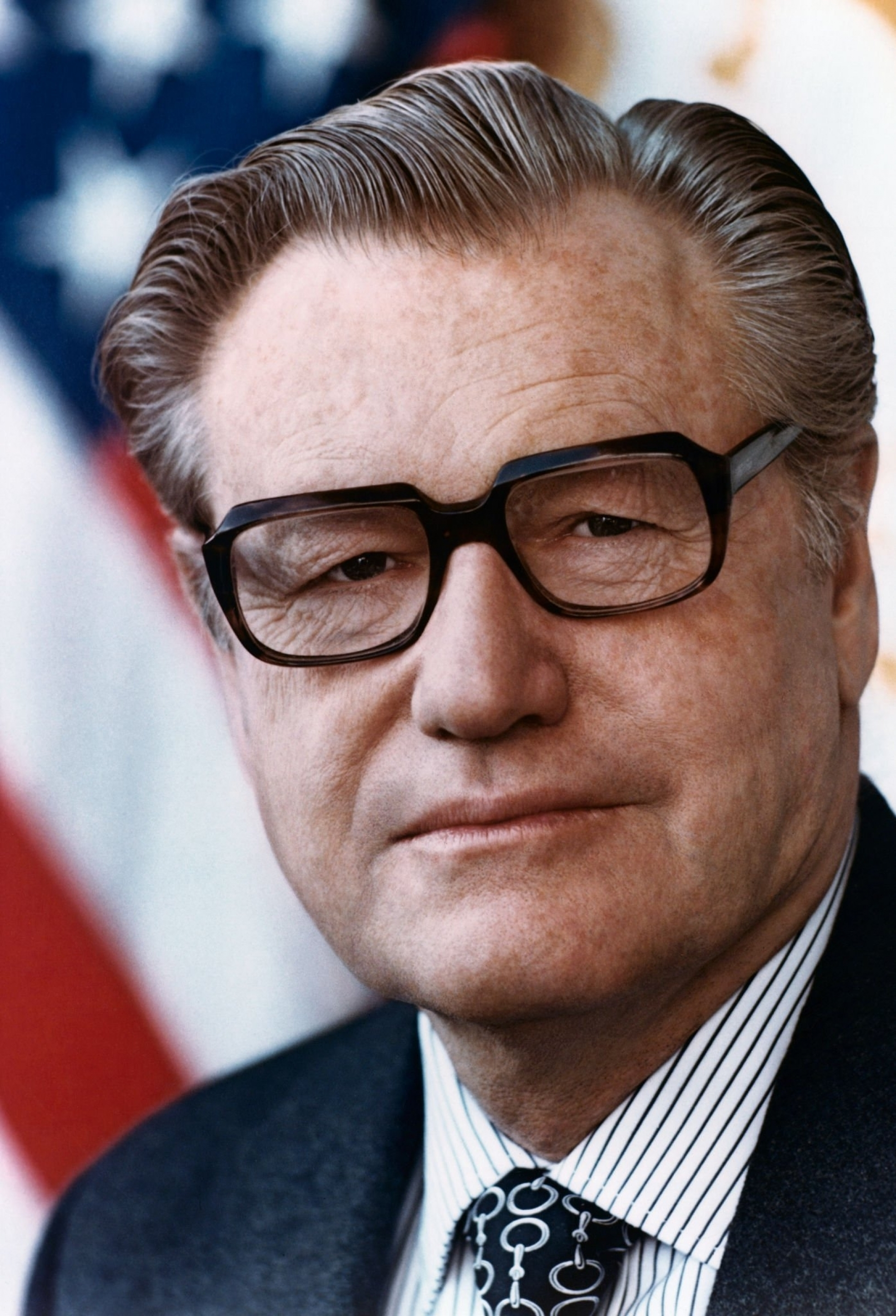
Nelson Rockefeller, Vice President of the United States

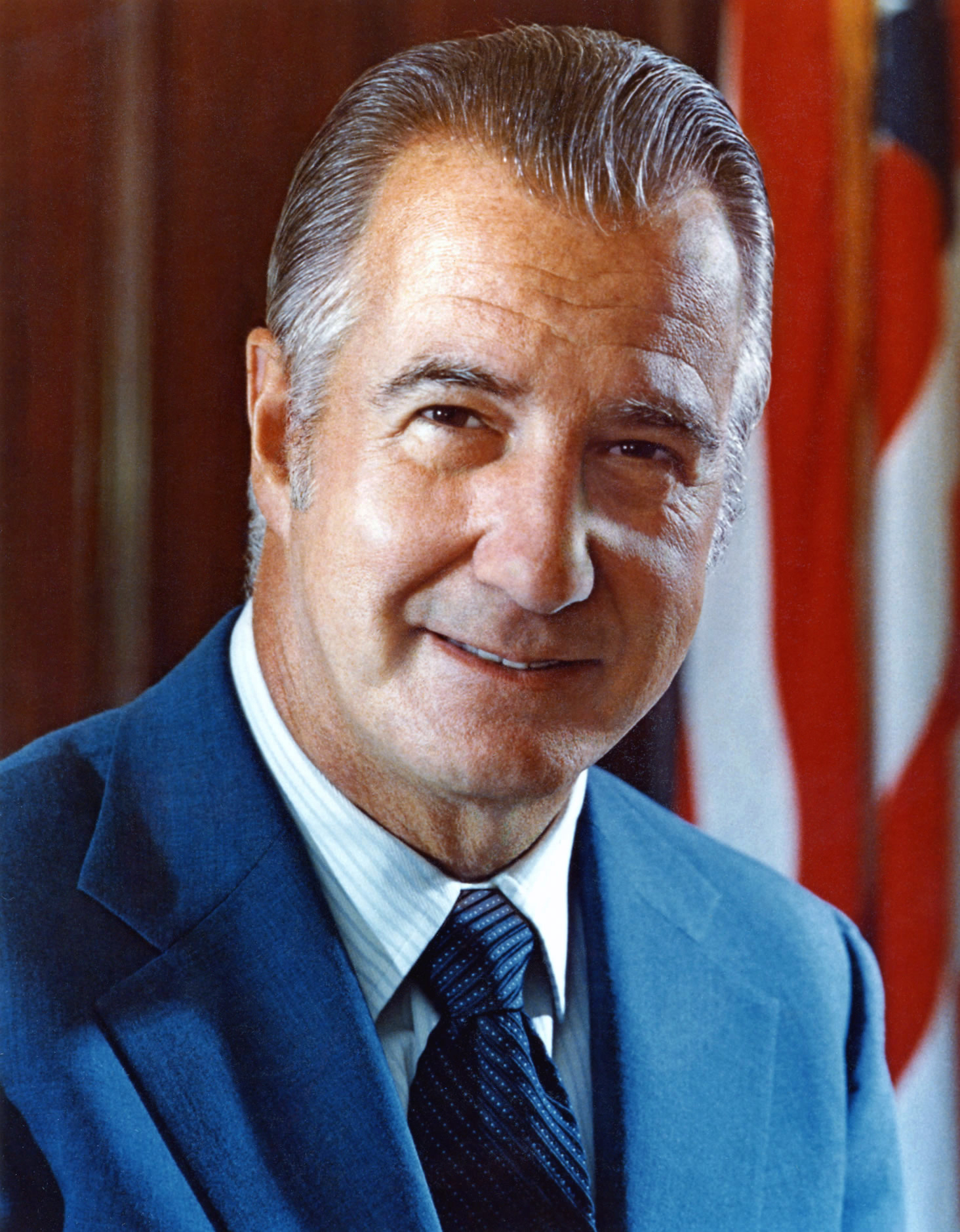
Spiro Agnew, former Vice President of the United States

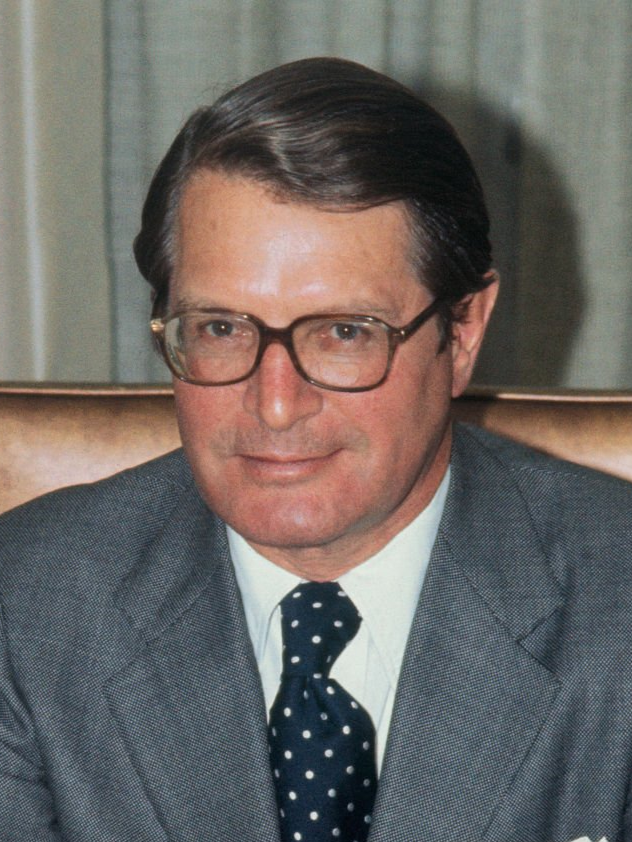
Elliot Richardson, former U.S. Attorney General and Ambassador to the United Kingdom

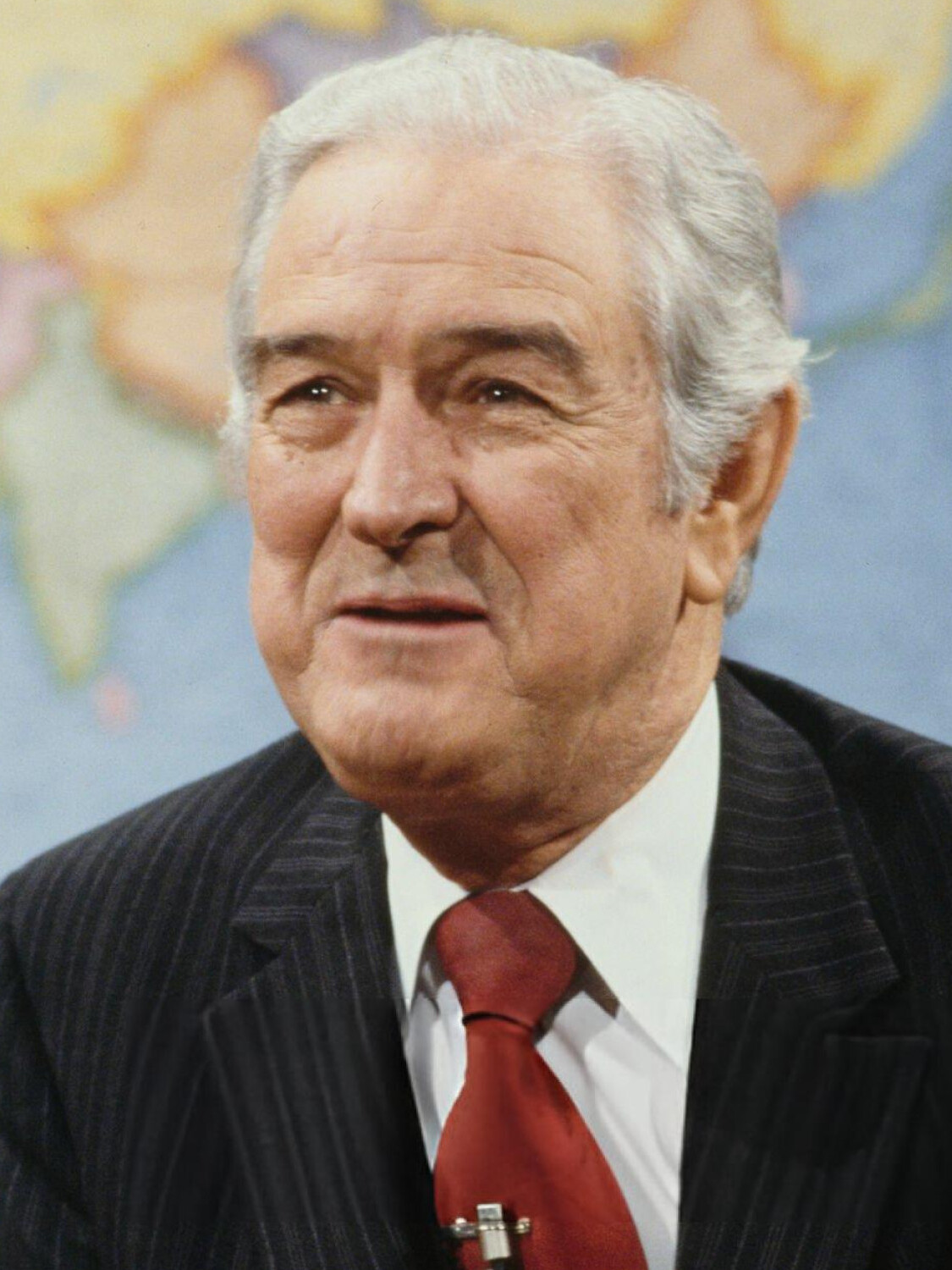
John Connally, former U.S. Secretary of the Treasury

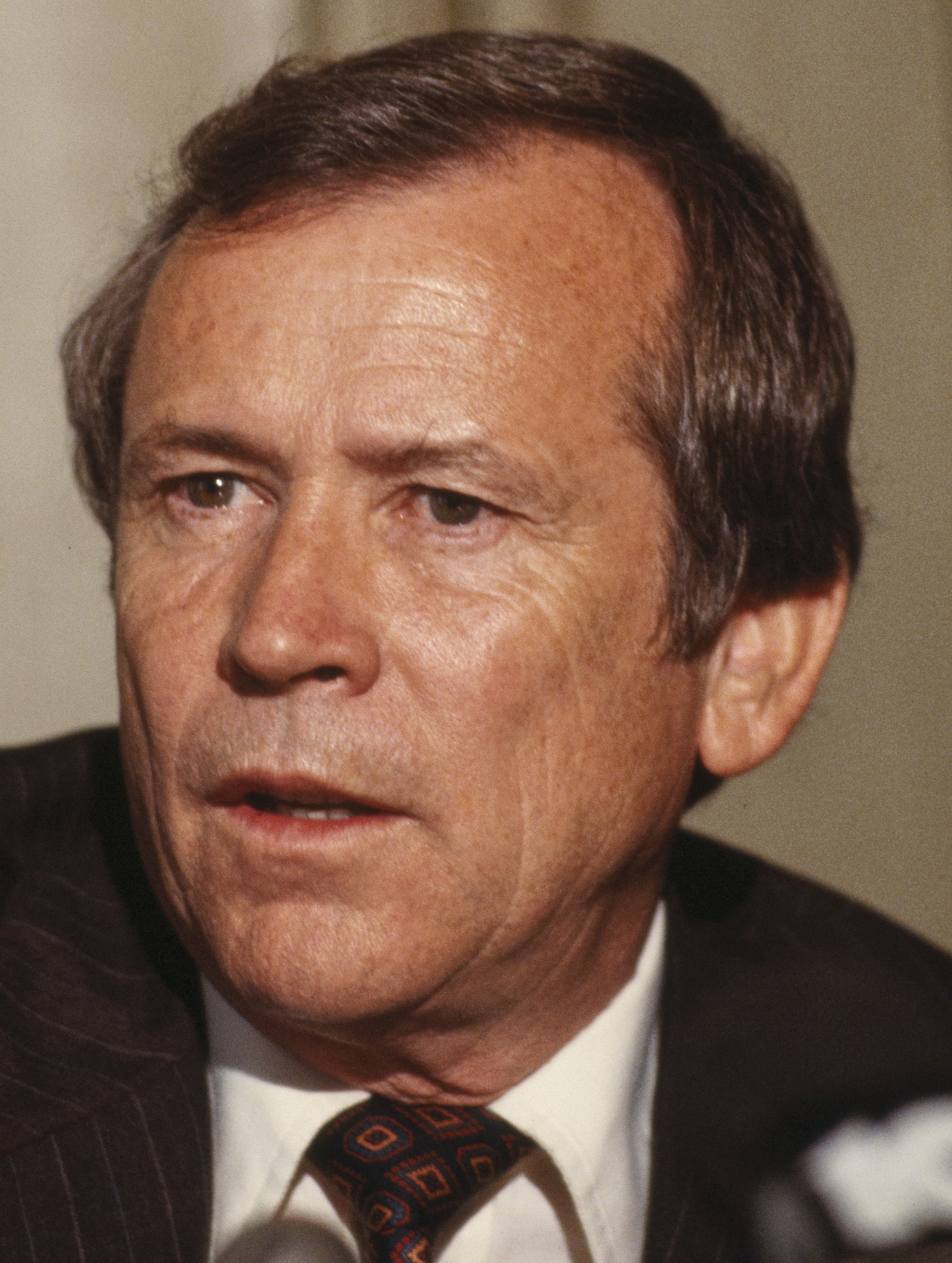
Howard Baker, Senator from Tennessee

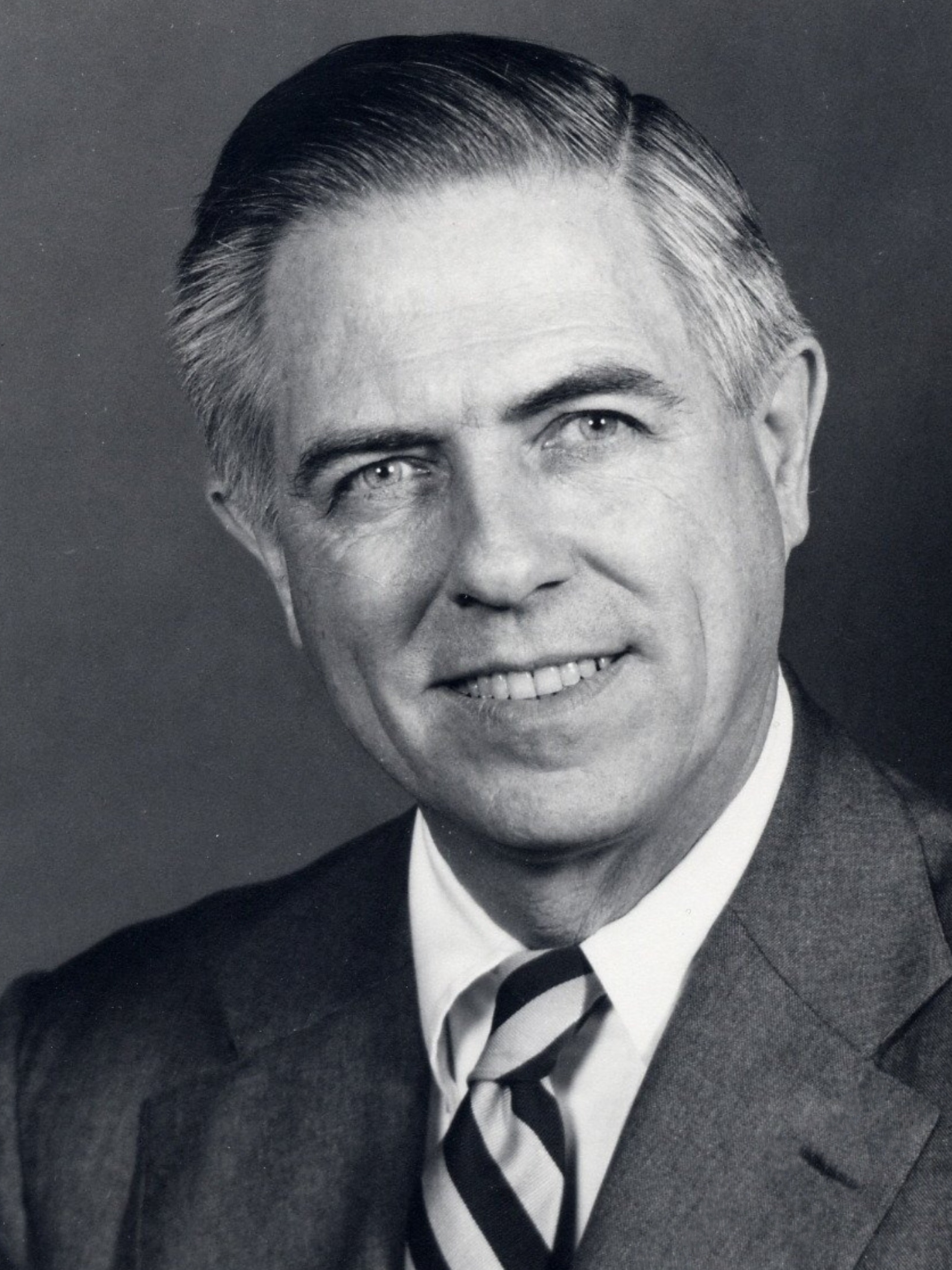
James L. Buckley, Senator from New York

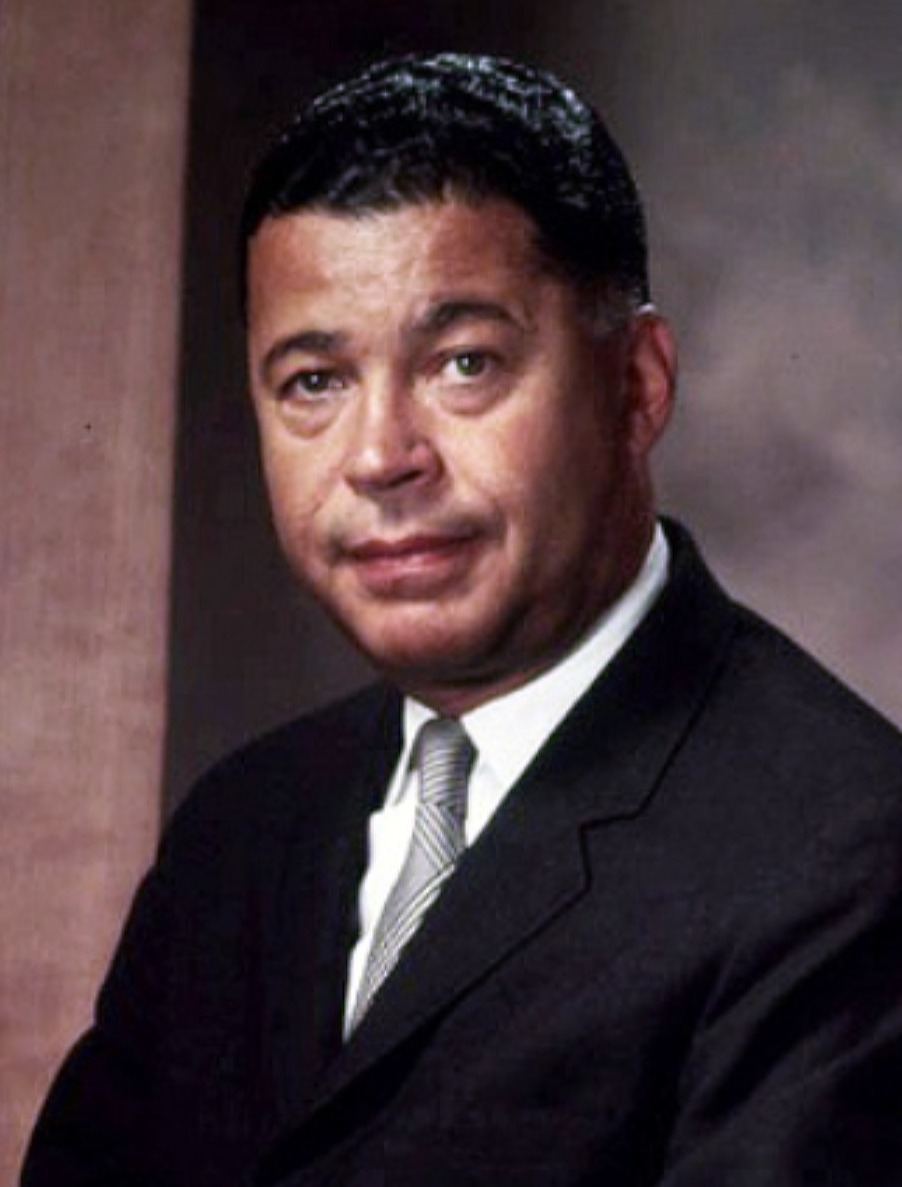
Edward Brooke, Senator from Massachusetts

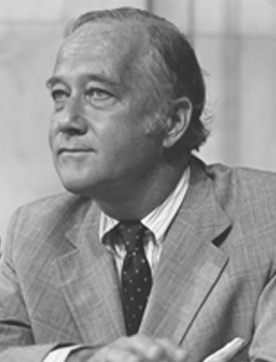
Charles Mathias, Senator from Maryland

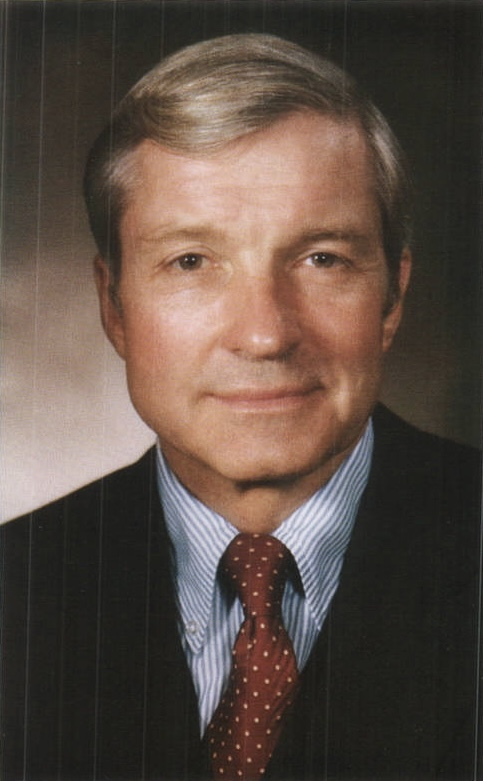
Charles Percy, Senator from Illinois

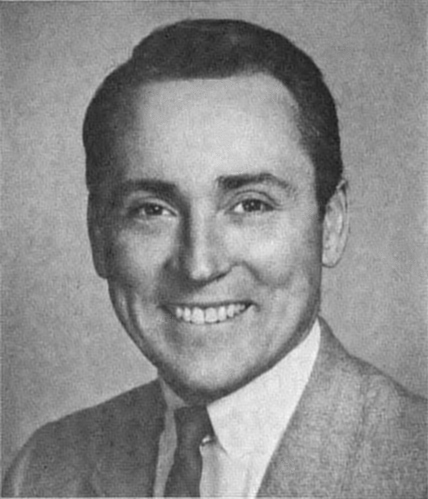
John Conlan, Representative from Arizona

==== Speculated candidates ====
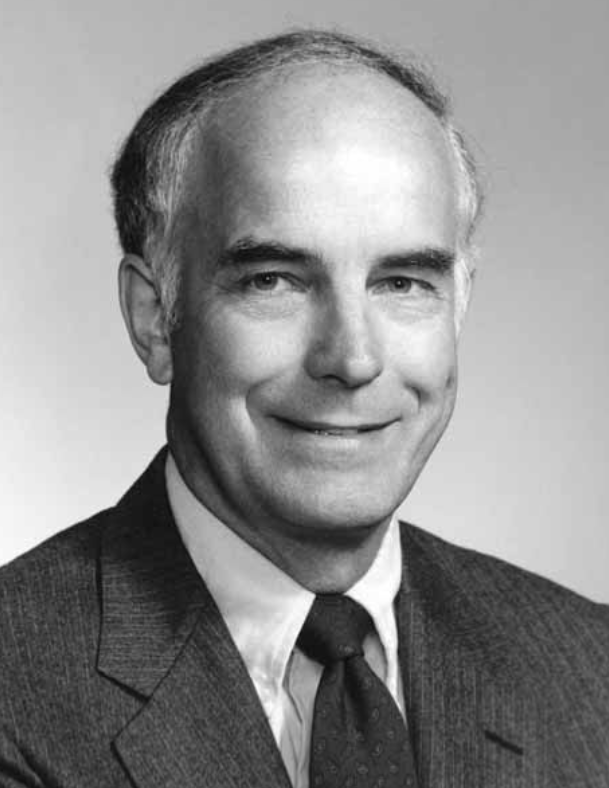
Daniel J. Evans, Governor of Washington

Melvin Laird, former U.S. Secretary of Defense

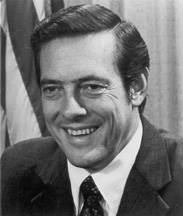
Bill Brock, Senator from Tennessee

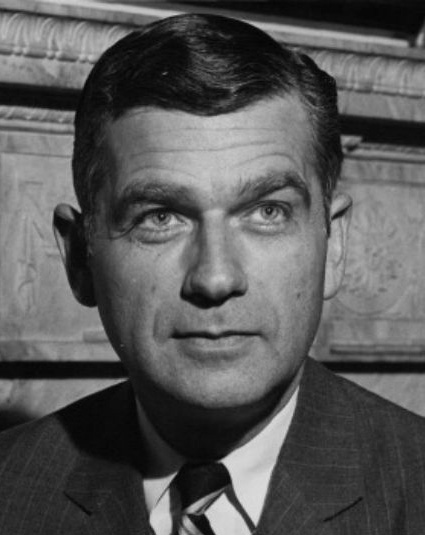
Mark Hatfield, Senator from Oregon

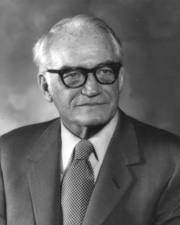
Barry Goldwater, Senator from Arizona

Lowell Weicker, Senator from Connecticut

=== Endorsements ===
List of Gerald Ford endorsements

Federal Officials

- Nelson Rockefeller Vice President of the United States

Former Federal Officials

- Earl Butz former United States Secretary of Agriculture (1971–1976)
- John Connally former United States Secretary of the Treasury (1971–1972)
- Rogers Morton former Counselor to the President (1976)

Senators

- Howard Baker (R-TN)
- Dewey F. Bartlett (R-OK)
- Henry Bellmon (R-OK)
- James L. Buckley (C-NY)
- Clifford Case (R-NJ)
- Carl Curtis (R-NE)
- Bob Dole (R-KS)
- Robert P. Griffin (R-MI)
- Mark Hatfield (R-OR)
- Roman Hruska (R-NE)
- Jacob Javits (R-NY)
- Paul Laxalt (R-NV)
- Bob Packwood (R-OR)
- James B. Pearson (R-KS)
- Charles H. Percy (R-IL)
- Richard Schweiker (R-PA)
- Robert Taft Jr. (R-OH)
- Strom Thurmond (R-SC)
- John Tower (R-TX)
- Lowell Weicker (R-CT)

Former Senators

- George Aiken (R-VT)
- Gordon Allott (R-CO)
- Wallace F. Bennett (R-UT)
- J. Caleb Boggs (R-DE)
- John W. Bricker (R-OH)
- Henry Cabot Lodge Jr. (R-MA)
- Harry P. Cain (R-WA)
- Homer Capehart (R-IN)
- Frank Carlson (R-KS)
- Marlow Cook (R-KY)
- John Sherman Cooper (R-KY)
- Norris Cotton (R-NH)
- Homer S. Ferguson (R-MI)
- Len Jordan (R-ID)
- Thomas Kuchel (R-CA)
- Frank Lausche (D-OH)
- Jack Miller (R-IA)
- Thruston Morton (R-KY)
- George Murphy (R-CA)
- Leverett Saltonstall (R-MA)
- Milward Simpson (R-WY)

Representatives

- John B. Anderson (R-IL)
- Bill Archer (R-TX)
- John M. Ashbrook (R-OH)
- Skip Bafalis (R-FL)
- Alphonzo E. Bell Jr. (R-CA)
- Edward G. Biester Jr. (R-PA)
- William Broomfield (R-MI)
- Bud Brown (R-OH)
- Jim Broyhill (R-NC)
- John Hall Buchanan Jr. (R-AL)
- Al Cederberg (R-MI)
- Clair Burgener (R-CA)
- Donald D. Clancy (R-OH)
- Don Clausen (R-CA)
- James Colgate Cleveland (R-NH)
- Thad Cochran (R-MS)
- Barber Conable (R-NY)
- Lawrence Coughlin (R-PA)
- Phil Crane (R-IL)
- Samuel L. Devine (R-OH)
- William L. Dickinson (R-AL)
- Jack Edwards (R-AL)
- Millicent Fenwick (R-NJ)
- Paul Findley (R-IL)
- Edwin B. Forsythe (R-NJ)
- Bill Frenzel (R-MN)
- Lou Frey (R-FL)
- Marvin Esch (R-MI)
- Benjamin Gilman (R-NY)
- Barry Goldwater Jr. (R-CA)
- Bill Gradison (R-OH)
- Chuck Grassley (R-IA)
- Tennyson Guyer (R-OH)
- Tom Hagedorn (R-MI)
- Bill Harsha (R-OH)
- Elwood Hillis (R-IN)
- Frank Horton (R-NY)
- Guy Vander Jagt (R-MI)
- John Jarman (R-OK)
- Tom Kindness (R-OH)
- Del Latta (R-OH)
- Trent Lott (R-MS)
- Ed Madigan (R-IL)
- Robert McClory (R-IL)
- Pete McCloskey (R-CA)
- Stewart McKinney (R-CT)
- Charles Adams Mosher (R-OH)
- Henson Moore (R-LA)
- Carlos Moorhead (R-CA)
- John T. Myers (R-IN)
- Ron Paul (R-TX)
- Joel Pritchard (R-WA)
- Al Quie (R-MN)
- Jimmy Quillen (R-TN)
- Ralph Regula (R-OH)
- Matthew J. Rinaldo (R-NJ)
- J. Kenneth Robinson (R-VA)
- John H. Rousselot (R-CA)
- Ronald A. Sarasin (R-CT)
- Dick Schulze (R-PA)
- Keith Sebelius (R-KS)
- Bud Shuster (R-PA)
- Gene Snyder (R-KY)
- Floyd Spence (R-SC)
- J. William Stanton (R-OH)
- Tom Steed (D-OK)
- Alan Steelman (R-TX)
- Dave Treen (R-LA)
- Richard Vander Veen (R-MI)
- Charles W. Whalen Jr. (R-OH)
- Charles E. Wiggins (R-CA)
- Bob Wilson (R-CA)
- Chalmers Wylie (R-OH)
- Bill Young (R-FL)

Former Representatives

- E. Ross Adair (R-IN)
- Glenn Andrews (R-AL)
- William Hanes Ayres (R-OH)
- LaMar Baker (R-TN)
- James F. Battin (R-MT)
- Page Belcher (R-OK)
- E. Y. Berry (R-SD)
- Jackson Edward Betts (R-OH)
- Benjamin B. Blackburn (R-GA)
- Frances P. Bolton (R-OH)
- William G. Bray (R-IN)
- Donald G. Brotzman (R-CO)
- Joel Broyhill (R-VA)
- D. Emmert Brumbaugh (R-PA)
- Hamer Budge (R-ID)
- George H. W. Bush (R-TX)
- John W. Byrnes (R-WI)
- Bo Callaway (R-GA)
- John Newbold Camp (R-OK)
- John Chenoweth (R-CO)
- Harold Collier (R-IL)
- William M. Colmer (D-MS)
- William Sheldrick Conover (R-PA)
- Sam Coon (R-OR)
- William C. Cramer (R-FL)
- Paul W. Cronin (R-MA)
- Glenn Cunningham (R-NE)
- Glenn R. Davis (R-WI)
- John R. Dellenback (R-OR)
- Robert V. Denney (R-NE)
- David W. Dennis (R-IN)
- Edwin Durno (R-OR)
- Charles H. Elston (R-OH)
- Hamilton Fish III (R-NY)
- O. C. Fisher (D-TX)
- Harold V. Froelich, (R-WI)
- Ed Foreman (R-NM)
- Ezekiel C. Gathings (D-AR)
- Edith Green (D-OR)
- George A. Goodling (R-PA)
- James R. Grover Jr. (R-NY)
- Charles Gubser (R-CA)
- G. Elliott Hagan (D-GA)
- Leonard W. Hall (R-NY)
- Charles Halleck (R-IN)
- Seymour Halpern (R-NY)
- Orval Hansen (R-ID)
- Robert P. Hanrahan (R-IL)
- William Henry Harrison III (R-WY)
- R. James Harvey (R-MI)
- Jeffrey P. Hillelson (R-MO)
- Patrick J. Hillings (R-CA)
- Lawrence Hogan (R-MD)
- Joseph F. Holt (R-CA)
- Craig Hosmer (R-CA)
- Robert J. Huber (R-MI)
- William H. Hudnut III (R-IN)
- John E. Hunt (R-NJ)
- Charles R. Jonas (R-NC)
- Walter Judd (R-MN)
- William J. Keating (R-OH)
- Hastings Keith (R-MA)
- Carleton J. King (R-NY)
- Theodore Kupferman (R-NY)
- Dan Kuykendall (R-TN)
- John Henry Kyl (R-IA)
- Melvin Laird (R-WI)
- Odin Langen (R-MN)
- Earl Landgrebe (R-IN)
- Sherman Lloyd (R-UT)
- Clare Boothe Luce (R-CT)
- Buz Lukens (R-OH)
- Clark MacGregor (R-MN)
- William Mailliard (R-CA)
- Joseph J. Maraziti (R-NJ)
- David Martin (R-NE)<f name=ford/>
- James D. Martin (R-AL)
- Bob Mathias (R-CA)
- Wiley Mayne (R-IA)
- William Moore McCulloch (R-OH)
- Jack H. McDonald (R-MI)
- Martin McKneally (R-NY)
- Mike McKevitt (R-CO)
- Robert T. McLoskey (R-IL)
- Walter L. McVey Jr. (R-KS)
- George Meader (R-MI)
- William E. Miller (R-NY)
- William Edwin Minshall Jr. (R-OH)
- Wilmer Mizell (R-NC)
- Arch Moore Jr. (R-WV)
- F. Bradford Morse (R-MA)
- Ancher Nelsen (R-MN)
- Alvin O'Konski (R-WI)
- Stanford Parris (R-VA)
- Dayton E. Phillips (R-TN)
- Alexander Pirnie (R-NY)
- Richard H. Poff (R-VA)
- Howard Pollock (R-AK)
- Walter E. Powell (R-OH)
- Bob Price (R-TX)
- Ben Reifel (R-SD)
- Edwin Reinecke (R-CA)
- Howard W. Robison (R-NY)
- Earl B. Ruth (R-NC)
- Charles Sandman (R-NJ)
- Henry Schadeberg (R-WI)
- William J. Scherle (R-IA)
- Fred Schwengel (R-IA)
- Richard G. Shoup (R-MT)
- Abner Sibal (R-CT)
- H. Allen Smith (R-CA)
- Henry P. Smith III (R-NY)
- Katharine St. George (R-NY)
- Robert H. Steele, (R-CT)
- John H. Terry, (R-NY)
- Fletcher Thompson (R-GA)
- Thor Tollefson (R-WA)
- David Towell (R-NV)
- William M. Tuck (D-VA)
- Stanley Tupper (R-ME)
- James Van Zandt (R-PA)
- Victor Veysey (R-CA)
- John H. Ware (R-PA)
- Prentiss Walker (R-MS)
- Jack Westland (R-WA)
- William B. Widnall (R-NJ)
- John S. Wold (R-WY)
- Wendell Wyatt (R-OR)
- Samuel H. Young (R-IL)
- Roger H. Zion (R-IN)
- John M. Zwach (R-MN)

Governors

- Robert Frederick Bennett (R-KS)
- Kit Bond (R-MO)
- Otis Bowen (R-IN)
- James B. Edwards (R-SC)
- Daniel J. Evans (R-WA)
- Mills Godwin (R-VA)
- James Holshouser (R-NC)
- William Milliken (R-MI)
- Robert D. Ray (R-IA)
- Jim Rhodes (R-OH)

Former Governors

- Sherman Adams (R-NH)
- William T. Cahill (R-NJ)
- Winfield Dunn (R-TN)
- Warren P. Knowles (R-WI)
- Benjamin T. Laney, (D-AR)
- John Davis Lodge (R-CT)
- Thomas Meskill, (R-CT)
- Richard B. Ogilvie (R-IL)
- George W. Romney (R-MI)
- William Scranton, (R-PA)
- John Bell Williams (D-MS)
- Malcolm Wilson (R-NY)

Lieutenant Governors

- John N. Dalton (R-VA)
- James Damman (R-MI)
- Bill Phelps (R-MO)
- Shelby Smith (R-KS)

Attorneys General

- John Danforth (R-MO)
- Louis J. Lefkowitz (R-NY)
- Robert List (R-NV)
- Evelle J. Younger (R-CA)

Mayors

- Robert Folsom Mayor of Dallas, Texas
- William H. Hudnut III Mayor of Indianapolis, Indiana
- Lawrence Francis Kramer Mayor of Paterson, New Jersey
- Pete Wilson Mayor of San Diego, California

Former Mayor

- Richard Lugar Mayor of Indianapolis, Indiana

Individuals

- Joe Frazier boxer
- Johnny Grant radio personality
- S. I. Hayakawa President of San Francisco State University
- Jack Nicklaus golfer

Baseball

- Andy Etchebarren California Angels catcher
- Bill Freehan Detroit Tigers catcher
- Joe Garagiola former St. Louis Cardinals catcher
- Steve Garvey Los Angeles Dodgers first baseman
- Ken Griffey Sr. Cincinnati Reds outfielder
- Ted Kluszewski Cincinnati Reds coach
- Pete Rose Cincinnati Reds infielder
- Don Sutton Los Angeles Dodgers pitcher

Basketball

- Johnny Orr Michigan Wolverines men's basketball head coach

Football

- Lance Alworth former San Diego Chargers wide receiver
- Bear Bryant Alabama Crimson Tide football head coach
- Woody Hayes Ohio State Buckeyes football head coach
- Ron Kramer former Green Bay Packers end
- Tom Landry Dallas Cowboys head coach

Actors and Actresses

- Fred Astaire
- Chuck Connors
- Bob Dornan
- Glenn Ford
- Zsa Zsa Gabor
- Cary Grant
- Peter Graves
- Jayne Meadows
- Ed Nelson
- Hugh O'Brian
- Dale Robertson
- Wayne Rogers
- Forrest Tucker
- John Wayne

Musicians

- Pearl Bailey singer
- Sonny Bono singer
- Roy Clark guitarist
- Ella Fitzgerald singer
- Lionel Hampton vibraphonist
- Al Hirt trumpeter
- Rod McKuen singer

== Polling ==
=== National polling ===
==== Before August 1974 ====
Poll source	Publication	Sample size	Spiro Agnew	Howard Baker	John Connally	Gerald Ford	Barry Goldwater	Charles Percy	Ronald Reagan	Nelson Rockefeller	Other	Undecided/None
Gallup	March 30 – April 2, 1973	700	35%	1%	15%	–	–	8%	20%	11%	5% (Note: James Buckley with 2%, Edward Brooke and Daniel Evans with 1% each, and Bill Brock with 0%)	6%
Gallup	August 30, 1973	?	22%	11%	10%	–	–	7%	22%	13%	6% (Note: James Buckley with 3%, Edward Brooke with 2%, Daniel Evans with 1%, and Bill Brock with 0%)	9%
Gallup	August 30, 1973	?	–	12%	12%	–	–	8%	32%	16%	9% (Note: James Buckley with 5%, Edward Brooke with 2%, Daniel Evans with 1%, and Bill Brock with 1%)	11%
Gallup	Oct. 6–8, 1973	356	–	3%	16%	–	–	14%	29%	19%	6% (Note: James Buckley with 3%, Edward Brooke with 2%, Bill Brock with 1%, and Daniel Evans with 0%)	8%
Gallup	January 4–7, 1974	377	–	5%	9%	24%	–	8%	20%	18%	8% (Note: Elliot Richardson with 3%, Mark Hatfield and James Buckley with 2% each, and Edward Brooke with 1%)	8%
Gallup	January 4–7, 1974	377	–	7%	11%	–	–	11%	26%	25%	10% (Note: Elliot Richardson with 4%, James Buckley with 3%, Mark Hatfield with 2%, and Edward Brooke with 1%)	10%
Gallup	July 21, 1974	?	–	5%	5%	27%	16%	4%	16%	12%	8% (Note: Elliot Richardson with 3%, James Buckley with 2%, Mark Hatfield with 2%, and Edward Brooke with 1%)	7%

==== August 1974 – December 1975 ====
Poll source	Publication	Sample size	Howard Baker	John Connally	Gerald Ford	Barry Goldwater	Charles Percy	Ronald Reagan	Nelson Rockefeller	Other	Undecided/None
Gallup	Feb. 28 – March 3, 1975	330	4%	–	34%	17%	3%	22%	10%	7% (Note: Mark Hatfield with 3%, Elliot Richardson with 3%, and James Buckley with 1%)	3%
Gallup	June 27–30, 1975	375	4%	2%	41%	13%	4%	20%	5%	6% (Note: Elliot Richardson with 3%, Mark Hatfield with 2%, and James L. Buckley with 1%)	5%
Gallup	Aug. 15–18, 1975	348	3%	3%	45%	11%	4%	19%	7%	5% (Note: James L. Buckley with 2%, Mark Hatfield with 2%, and Elliot Richardson with 1%)	3%
Gallup	Oct. 17–20, 1975	339	2%	1%	48%	7%	2%	25%	5%	2% (Note: Elliot Richardson with 3%, James L. Buckley and Mark Hatfield with 1% each)	5%
Gallup	Nov. 21–24, 1975	352	2%	1%	32%	10%	3%	40%	6%	5% (Note: Mark Hatfield with 2%, Elliot Richardson with 2%, and James L. Buckley with 1%)	1%

==== Head-to-head polling ====
Poll source	Publication	Sample size	Gerald Ford	Ronald Reagan	Undecided/None
Gallup	June 27–30, 1975	375	61%	33%	6%
Gallup	Dec. 12–15, 1975	?	45%	45%	10%

== Convention ==
First ballot vote for the presidential nomination by state delegation

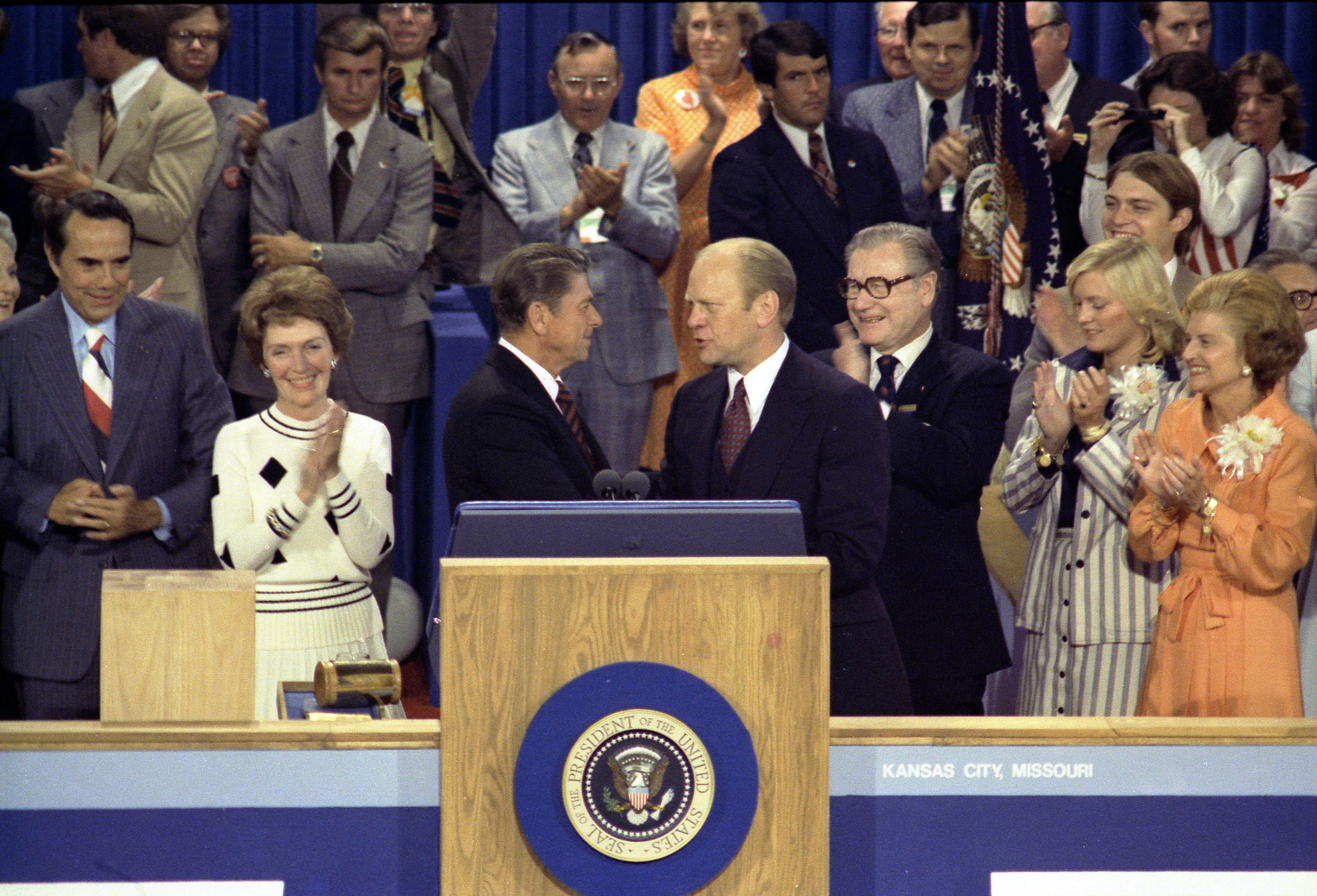
Ford and Reagan shook hands at 1976 Republican National Convention (first row from left to right: Bob Dole, Nancy Reagan, Ronald Reagan, Gerald Ford, Nelson Rockefeller, Susan Ford, Betty Ford)

The 1976 Republican National Convention was held in Kemper Arena, Kansas City. As the convention began, Ford was seen as having a slight lead in delegate votes, but fewer than the 1,130 he needed to win. Reagan and Ford competed for the votes of individual delegates and state delegations. In a bid to woo moderate Northern Republicans, Reagan shocked the convention by announcing that if he won the nomination, Senator Richard Schweiker of Pennsylvania, from the northern liberal wing of the party, would be his running mate. The move backfired, however, as few moderates switched to Reagan while many conservative delegates were outraged. The key state of Mississippi, which Reagan needed, narrowly voted for Ford; it was believed that Reagan's choice of Schweiker led Clarke Reed, Mississippi's chairman, to switch to Ford. Ford then narrowly won the nomination on the first ballot. He chose Senator Robert Dole of Kansas as his running mate. After giving his acceptance speech, Ford asked Reagan to say a few words to the convention.

=== Results ===
Convention tally:

Candidate	Votes	%
Gerald Ford	1,187	52.57
Ronald Reagan	1,070	47.39
Elliot Richardson	1	0.04
Total	2,258	100.00

== See also ==
- 1976 Democratic Party presidential primaries
