= John C. Beale =

Former US senior policy advisor, convicted fraudster

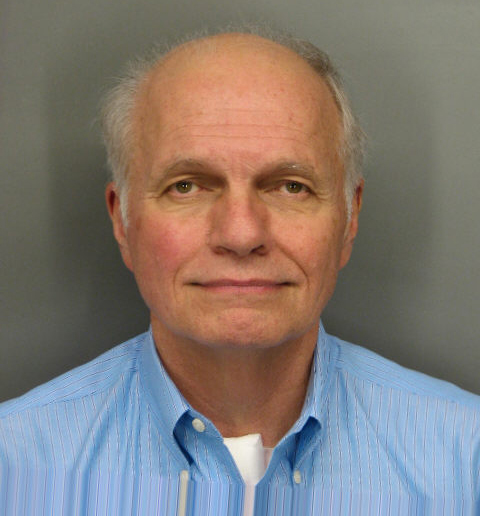
- Beale's 2013 mugshot
- Born: John Charles Beale; 1948 (age 77–78); St. Louis County, Minnesota
- Occupation: Senior policy advisor for the EPA
- Spouse: Nancy Kete
- Conviction: Felony theft of government property
- Penalty: 32 months in prison, fined $1.4 million

John Charles Beale (born 1948) is a former senior policy advisor of the United States Environmental Protection Agency (EPA). Beale was convicted of felony theft of government property after it came to light in 2013 that he had defrauded the government out of $886,186 starting in 2000, primarily by pretending to be an agent for the Central Intelligence Agency (CIA).

== Early life ==
Beale was born in 1948 in St. Louis County, Minnesota to C. Gordon Beale, a minister of the United Church of Christ, and Marcella Beale, a nurse. He served in the United States Army as a medic in the early 1970s and was honorably discharged. Beale attended the University of California, Riverside, earning a bachelor's degree in political science in 1975, using resources provided by the G.I. Bill. Beale interned for Democratic US Senator John V. Tunney while in college, assisting in the negotiation of the Bilingual Courts Act. He later simultaneously earned a Master of Public Administration from Princeton University and a law degree from New York University. Beale was employed with a law firm consisting of three partners in Lake City, Minnesota for four years prior to his work with the EPA. During his time with this law firm, he primarily dealt with the Federal Election Commission and the Securities and Exchange Commission.

Beale is married to Nancy Kete, another former EPA employee. Kete is also a former managing director of the Rockefeller Foundation.

== EPA work ==
In 1987, Beale began working as a part-time consultant for the EPA, becoming full-time in 1988. In 1989, Beale was hired as a full-time EPA employee in the position of Senior Policy Advisor, at a pay grade of GS-15. He was brought on with the EPA primarily through his relationship with Robert Brenner, who was then deputy director of the Office of Air and Radiation at the EPA. Brenner and Beale had been classmates together at Princeton. Previously, Beale had no experience dealing with environmental issues, but was seen as a good negotiator and had some experience dealing with Congress from his internship during college. He also expressed that he "always had an interest in environmental issues."

Beale worked on amendments to the Clean Air Act, and was widely lauded for his efforts. In 1989, Beale was a member of a 24-person team that was awarded the EPA Gold Medal for Exceptional Service, its highest honor, "In recognition of outstanding contributions to the development of the 1989 Clean Air Act Amendments." Twenty-year veteran of the EPA Aron Anthony Golberg noted that Beale was "one of the most capable people whom [he] knew during [his] career". In 1991 and again in 2000, Beale was given a retention bonus, consisting of 25% of his annual salary. (Although the retention bonus is an award to be paid out for no more than three years, in Beale's case the awards were paid for a total of 12 years). In 2005, Beale also received a Meritorious Executive Rank Award, a category of the Presidential Rank Award, which carried a $28,201 payment.

Prior to his arrest, he was assigned to the Office of Air and Radiation, the division responsible for the development of national programs, policies and regulations designed to control air pollution and radiation exposure.

== Fraud ==
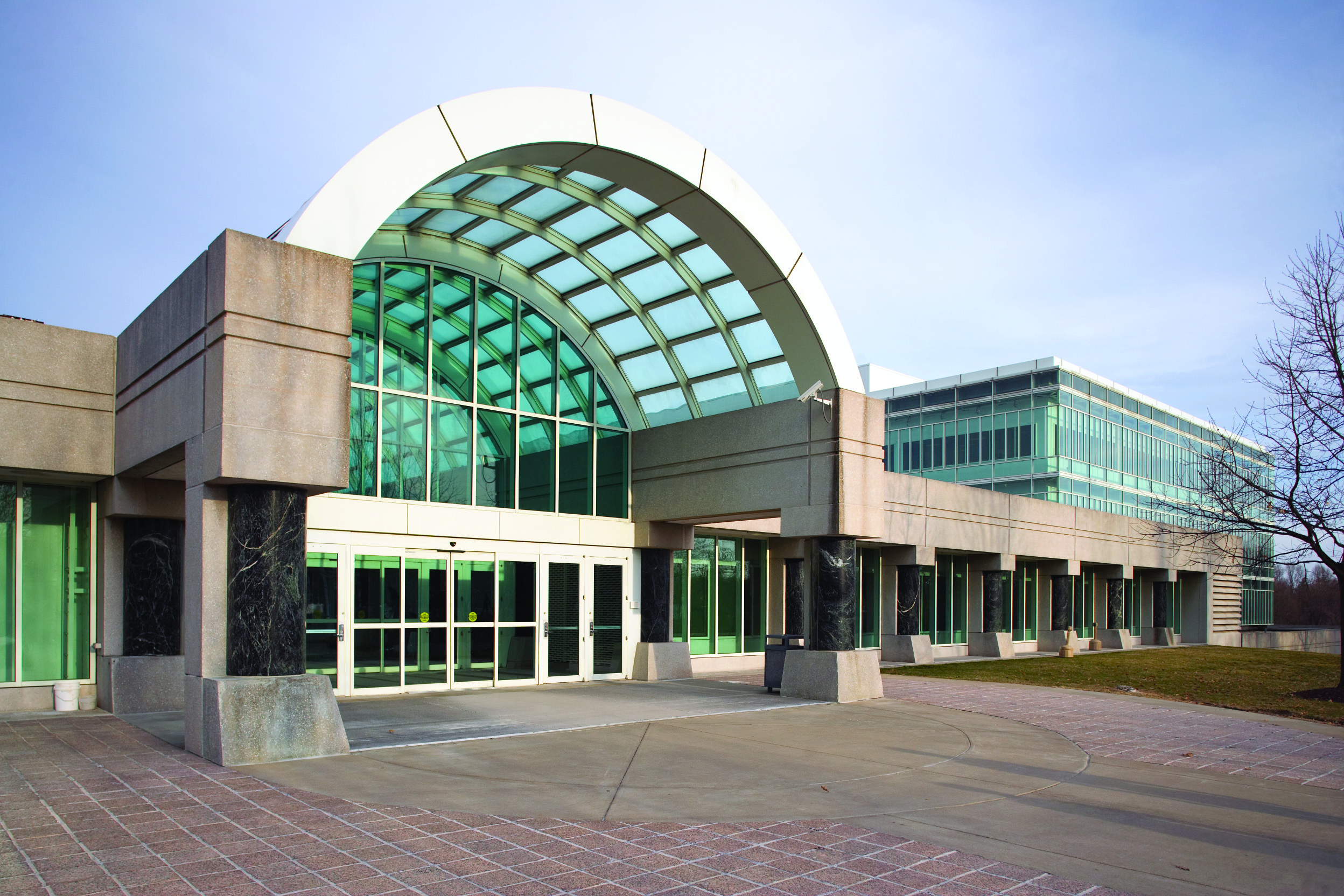
The headquarters for the CIA in Langley, Virginia, where Beale reported to spend time.

Given Beale's degree of travel in his work for the EPA, there were rumors that he was a "secret agent". Beginning in 2000, Beale began skipping work on occasional Wednesdays with "D.O. Oversight" noted on his calendar on nine days throughout 2000, and continuing many times until his retirement in 2011. In his 2013 deposition, Beale recalled the first time speaking with someone about these skipped days. Beale said that he told Jeffrey Holmstead, then assistant administrator at the Office of Air and Radiation, that he was working for the CIA, and that these days were spent working for the CIA's Directorate of Operations (now the National Clandestine Service). Beale would later admit that during these days he was at home reading or exercising. In 2002, Beale was given a subsidized parking space because he had led his coworkers to believe that he had contracted malaria during the Vietnam War. Beale held the space until June 2005, costing a total of $8,000. He in fact never had malaria, and did not serve in Vietnam. Beale was familiar with the symptoms of the disease from his time as a medic in the army, treating soldiers in the United States. From 2005 to 2007, Beale claimed to be working on an EPA research project and drew $57,235 in travel expenses to Los Angeles, where he was in fact visiting family in nearby Bakersfield. The travel expenses covered first-class flights and stays in high-end hotels. For a period of six months in 2008, Beale did not report to work for the EPA under the guise of his CIA work, but continued to draw his salary from the EPA.

In 2011 Beale told his colleagues that he was retiring from the EPA, throwing a boat party on the Potomac River in September that was attended by his boss, Gina McCarthy, who later became the administrator of the EPA. Despite the purported retirement, Beale continued to draw his salary, and the temporary bonus that was supposed to cease in 2003 continued to be paid through 2013. By the time of his retirement, Beale was the highest paid employee in the EPA, making more than administrator McCarthy.

=== Discovery and conviction ===
In November 2012, an EPA HR employee discovered that Beale was still drawing his salary and temporary bonus following his retirement, and brought the issue to the attention of McCarthy. McCarthy exchanged several emails with Beale about the issue, to which he responded that he was still engaged in work with the CIA. In late December 2012, a Homeland Security employee who worked as the liaison for the EPA to the intelligence community made contact with Beale, saying that they had no record of Beale ever having worked for the CIA. On January 7, 2013, McCarthy met with Beale at her office, detailing that the EPA would require documentation of Beale's work with the CIA. Beale reported that he would work on it, but a month later reported that the CIA would not acknowledge his work with them. McCarthy responded "that puts you in a really bad position, doesn't it?"

Mark Kaminsky, an investigator for the Office of the Inspector General, began to look into the case in February 2013. Beale initially refused to answer questions, and his colleagues at the EPA only had glowing reviews of his work there. Kaminsky noted that Beale was atypical in that "he lied across all aspects of his life," even finding emails with his wife that kept up the lie. Kaminsky ultimately proved that Beale was lying by showing that at times he reported to be overseas engaged in CIA operations, he was in fact making domestic cell phone calls. He was also able to confirm with the CIA that Beale never did any work there. In a subsequent meeting, Beale admitted to his crimes. Kaminsky and Beale counted up a total of nearly two and a half years of work that he had missed under the ruse of working for the CIA. He entered a guilty plea on September 27, 2013, to felony theft of government property, and submitted a check to the court for $886,186. The amount included $437,901 in fraudulent retention bonuses and $58,127 for the "D.O. Oversight" days, among other fraudulent earnings. Beale also agreed to a punitive criminal forfeiture of $507,207 for a total payment of $1,393,393. On December 18, 2013, Beale was sentenced to 32 months in prison, two years of supervised release, and 100 hours of community service for each of those two years.

Many of Beale's former colleagues at the EPA were incredulous regarding the revelations of his falsehoods. Some colleagues even asserted that he was "taking one for the team" so as not to reveal the nature of his supposed CIA work. During his December 2013 deposition, Beale said that his relationship with his wife had been "profoundly affected" following the revelations.

Beale was incarcerated at the Federal Correctional Institution, Cumberland and was released on June 1, 2016.
