= Randall K. Filer =

American economist

Randall Keith Filer (born January 14, 1952) is an American economist. Dr. Filer is an emeritus professor of economics at Hunter College and the Graduate Center of the City University of New York and a senior scholar at CERGE-EI. He is a Trustee and past President of the CERGE-EI Foundation, a US-based nonprofit that supports economic education in the post-communist countries of Central and Eastern Europe and a member (past Chair) of the International Faculty Committee at the International School of Economics in Tbilisi (ISET) in Tbilisi, Georgia. He is a research Fellow of the Institute for the Study of Labor (IZA) in Bonn, CESifo (Munich), the William Davidson Institute (Ann Arbor) and the Manhattan Institute (NYC). Professor Filer was the Founder and serves as President of the Economic Fundamental Initiative, an NGO dedicated to promoting economics literacy in the Western Balkans, Ukraine, teh South Caucuses and Central Asia.

Professor Filer received his Ph.D. from Princeton University in 1979 where he was affiliated with the Industrial Relations Section and the Office of Population Research. He graduated magna cum laude with Highest Honors in economics from Haverford College. His research has been supported by the National Science Foundation, the ACE program of the European Union, the Alfred P. Sloan Foundation, the Volkswagen Foundation, and the National Endowment for the Arts, among others and has appeared in leading professional journals including The American Economic Review, The Journal of Political Economy, The Review of Economics and Statistics, The European Economic Review, The Journal of Development Economics, Economic Development and Cultural Change, The Journal of Corporate Finance, and The Economics of Transition. His areas of expertise include financial and capital markets, labor markets, urban economics, demography and development economics, including the economic transition in the post-communist countries of Central and Eastern Europe. Professor Filer has twice been a Fulbright Scholar in the Czech Republic, a Fulbright Global Scholar in Uzbekistan, Kazakhstan and Georgia as well as a visiting scholar at the Institute of Economics, Zagreb, Croatia.

Professor Filer is a member of Prague Society for International Cooperation. Founded during the anti-communist movement, the Prague Society is one of the oldest NGOs in the Czech Republic. It pursues former Members of the Communist Era Secret Police (StB, Stasi, Służba Bezpieczeństwa, ÁVO, Securitate and others), fights corruption and helps to develop a new generation of responsible leaders in Central and Eastern Europe.
