= 1972 United States House of Representatives elections in New Jersey =

- November 7, 1972

All 15 New Jersey seats to the United States House of Representatives
- Turnout: 84% (▲14pp)
	Majority party	Minority party
Party	Democratic	Republican
Last election	9	6
Seats won	8	7
Seat change	▼1	▲1
Popular vote	1,390,869	1,416,485
Percentage	49.1%	50.0%
Democratic
50–60%
60–70%
Republican
50–60%
60–70%
70–80%

The 1972 United States House of Representatives elections in New Jersey were held on November 7, 1972, to determine who would represent the people of New Jersey in the United States House of Representatives. This election coincided with national elections for U.S. House, U.S. Senate, and president of the United States. New Jersey had fifteen seats in the House, apportioned according to the 1970 United States census. Representatives are elected for two-year terms.

Despite a landslide victory for Republican incumbent Richard Nixon in the state's presidential election, the Republican Party gained only one seat, as the direct result of decennial redistricting.

== Overview ==
1972 United States House of Representatives elections in New Jersey
Party	Votes	Percentage	Candidates	Seats	+/–
Democratic	1,390,869	49.11%	15	8	▼1
Republican	1,416,485	50.02%	15	7	▲1
Socialist Labor	1,206	0.04%	2	0	Steady
People's	2,791	0.73%	1	0	Steady
Independents	20,558	1.96%	9	0	Steady
Totals	2,831,909	100.00%	42	15	Steady

== Background ==
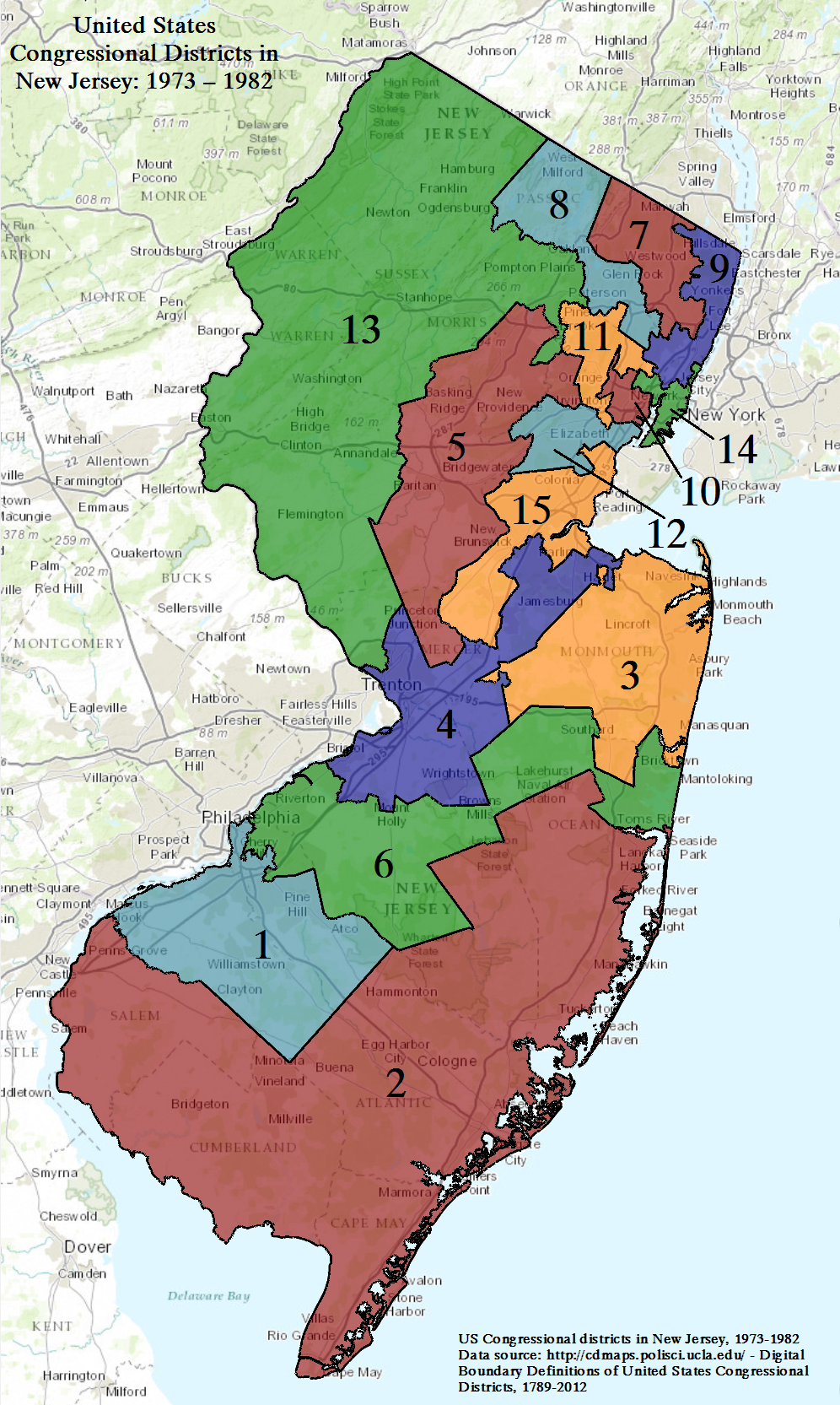
New Jersey congressional districts after the 1970 census decennial redistricting

Following the 1970 United States census, the New Jersey legislature conducted decennial redistricting. The resulting map combined the 13th and 14th districts, pitting Democratic incumbents Dominick V. Daniels and Cornelius Gallagher against each other, and created a new 13th district in the northwestern region of the state.

The new 13th district, which was conservative and more rural, was designed specifically for Republican state senator Joseph J. Maraziti to run. The new 14th district combined the old 13th and 14th districts, pitting two Democratic incumbents against each other.

== District 1 ==
1972 New Jersey's 1st congressional district election
- November 7, 1972
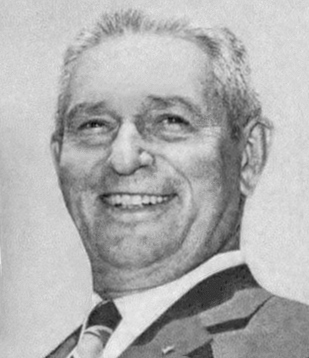

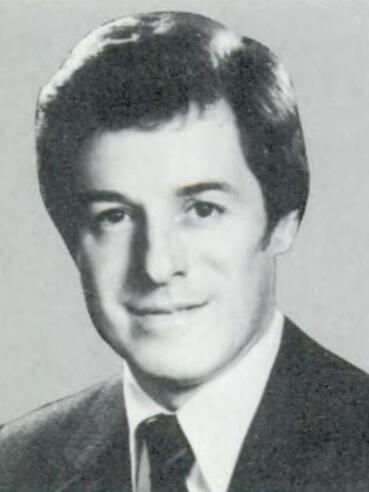
Nominee	John E. Hunt	James Florio
Party	Republican	Democratic
Popular vote	97,650	87,492
Percentage	52.5%	47.0%
U.S. Representative before election
John E. Hunt
Republican
Elected U.S. Representative
John E. Hunt
Democratic

The district included Gloucester County and parts of Camden County.

Republican incumbent John E. Hunt was re-elected to a fourth term in office over Democratic Assemblyman James Florio.

=== Republican primary ===
==== Candidates ====
- John E. Hunt, incumbent representative since 1967

==== Results ====
1972 Republican primary
Party	Candidate	Votes	%
Republican	John E. Hunt (incumbent)	13,370	100.00%
Total votes		13,370	100.00%

=== Democratic primary ===
==== Candidates ====
- Elizabeth Drevs, Haddonfield freelance writer
- James Florio, assemblyman from Camden

==== Results ====
1972 Democratic primary
Party	Candidate	Votes	%
Democratic	James Florio	12,946	79.72%
Democratic	Elizabeth Drevs	3,294	20.28%
Total votes		16,240	100.00%

=== General election ===
==== Candidates ====
- Dominic W. Doganiero (Socialist Labor)
- James Florio, assemblyman from Camden (Democratic)
- Gerrit Hoogenraad (Socialist)
- John E. Hunt, incumbent representative since 1967 (Republican)
- Raymond V.S. Miller (Taxation with Representation)

==== Results ====
1972 U.S. House election
Party	Candidate	Votes	%	±%
Republican	John E. Hunt (incumbent)	97,650	52.49%	
Democratic	James Florio	87,492	47.03%	
Independent	Raymond V.S. Miller	408	0.21%	
Socialist Labor	Dominic W. Doganiero	225	0.12%	
Socialist	Gerrit Hoogenraad	221	0.12%	
Total votes		186,026	100.00%	
Republican hold		Swing	{{{swing}}}	

== District 2 ==
1972 New Jersey's 2nd congressional district election
- November 7, 1972
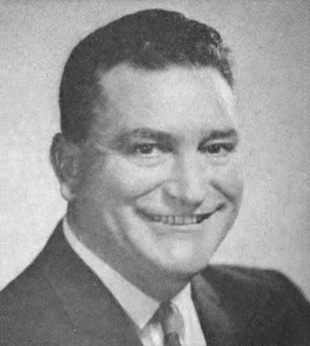

Nominee	Charles W. Sandman Jr.	John D. Rose
Party	Republican	Democratic
Popular vote	133,096	69,374
Percentage	65.7%	34.3%
U.S. Representative before election
Charles W. Sandman Jr.
Republican
Elected U.S. Representative
Charles W. Sandman Jr.
Democratic

This district, the largest in South Jersey, included all of Atlantic, Cape May, Cumberland, and Salem counties and parts of Burlington and Ocean counties.

Republican incumbent Charles W. Sandman Jr. was re-elected to a fourth term in office over Democratic nominee John D. Rose.

=== Republican primary ===
==== Candidates ====
- Charles W. Sandman Jr., incumbent representative since 1967, and candidate for governor in 1965 and 1969

==== Results ====
1972 Republican primary
Party	Candidate	Votes	%
Republican	Charles W. Sandman Jr. (inc.)	28,646	100.00%
Total votes		28,646	100.00%

=== Democratic primary ===
==== Candidates ====
- John D. Rose

==== Results ====
1972 Democratic primary
Party	Candidate	Votes	%
Democratic	John D. Rose	12,507	100.00%
Total votes		12,507	100.00%

=== General election ===
==== Candidates ====
- John D. Rose (Democratic)
- Charles W. Sandman Jr., incumbent representative since 1967, and candidate for governor in 1965 and 1969 (Republican)

==== Results ====
1972 U.S. House election
Party	Candidate	Votes	%	±%
Republican	Charles W. Sandman Jr. (inc.)	133,096	65.74%	
Democratic	John D. Rose	69,374	34.26%	
Total votes		202,470	100.00%	
Republican hold		Swing	{{{swing}}}	

== District 3 ==
1972 New Jersey's 3rd congressional district election
- November 7, 1972
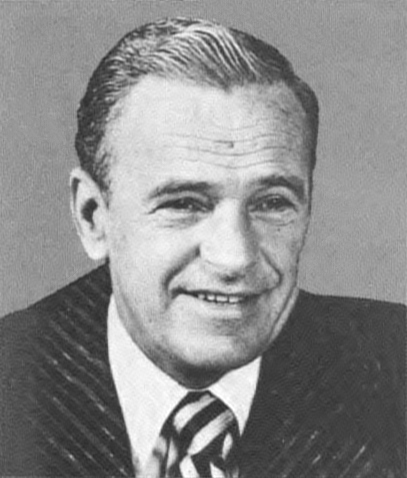

Nominee	James J. Howard	William F. Dowd
Party	Democratic	Republican
Popular vote	103,893	92,285
Percentage	53.0%	47.0%
U.S. Representative before election
James J. Howard
Democratic
Elected U.S. Representative
James J. Howard
Democratic

This district included parts of Monmouth and Ocean counties.

Democratic incumbent James J. Howard was re-elected to a fifth term in office.

=== Democratic primary ===
==== Candidates ====
- James J. Howard, incumbent representative since 1965

==== Results ====
1972 Democratic primary
Party	Candidate	Votes	%
Democratic	James J. Howard (incumbent)	13,668	100.00%
Total votes		13,668	100.00%

=== Republican primary ===
==== Candidates ====
- William F. Dowd, former aide to Richard Nixon and nominee for this district in 1970

==== Results ====
1972 Republican primary
Party	Candidate	Votes	%
Republican	William F. Dowd	18,214	100.00%
Total votes		18,214	100.00%

=== General election ===
==== Candidates ====
- William F. Dowd, former aide to Richard Nixon and nominee for this district in 1970 (Republican)
- James J. Howard, incumbent representative since 1965 (Democratic)

==== Results ====
1972 U.S. House election
Party	Candidate	Votes	%	±%
Democratic	James J. Howard (incumbent)	103,893	52.96%	
Republican	William F. Dowd	92,285	47.04%	
Total votes		196,178	100.00%	
Democratic hold		Swing	{{{swing}}}	

== District 4 ==
1972 New Jersey's 4th congressional district election
- November 7, 1972
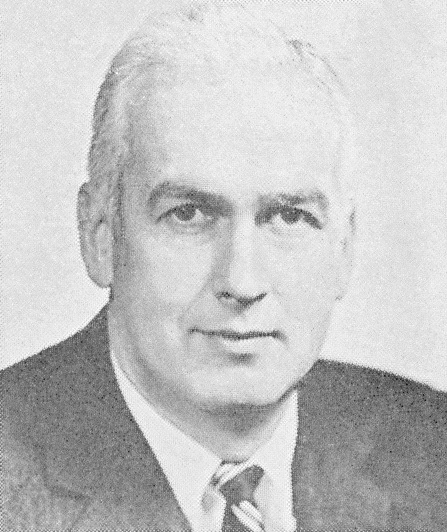

Nominee	Frank Thompson	Peter P. Garibaldi
Party	Democratic	Republican
Popular vote	98,206	71,030
Percentage	58.0%	42.0%
U.S. Representative before election
Frank Thompson
Democratic
Elected U.S. Representative
Frank Thompson
Democratic

This district, in Central Jersey, consisted of parts of Burlington, Mercer, Middlesex, and Monmouth counties.

Democratic incumbent Frank Thompson was re-elected to a ninth term in office.

=== Democratic primary ===
==== Candidates ====
- Frank Thompson, incumbent representative since 1955

==== Results ====
1972 Democratic primary
Party	Candidate	Votes	%
Democratic	Frank Thompson (incumbent)	13,115	100.00%
Total votes		13,115	100.00%

=== Republican primary ===
==== Candidates ====
- Peter P. Garibaldi, assemblyman from Monroe and nominee for the 15th district in 1970

==== Results ====
1972 Republican primary
Party	Candidate	Votes	%
Republican	Peter P. Garibaldi	9,280	100.00%
Total votes		9,280	100.00%

=== General election ===
==== Candidates ====
- Peter P. Garibaldi, assemblyman from Monroe and nominee for the 15th district in 1970 (Republican)
- Frank Thompson, incumbent representative since 1955 (Democratic)

==== Results ====
1972 U.S. House election
Party	Candidate	Votes	%	±%
Democratic	Frank Thompson (incumbent)	98,206	58.03%	
Republican	Peter P. Garibaldi	71,030	41.97%	
Total votes		169,236	100.00%	
Democratic hold		Swing	{{{swing}}}	

== District 5 ==
1972 New Jersey's 5th congressional district election
- November 7, 1972
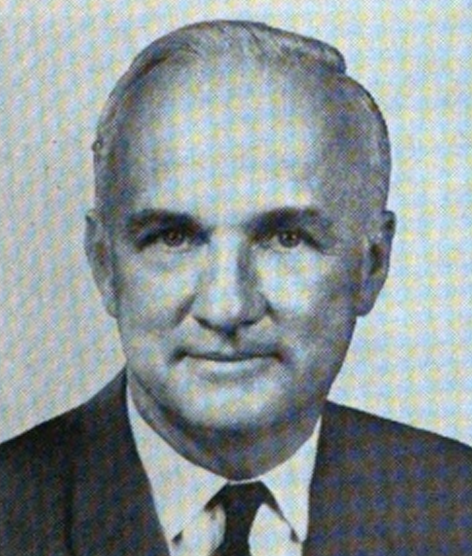

Nominee	Peter Frelinghuysen Jr.	Fred Bohen
Party	Republican	Democratic
Popular vote	127,310	78,076
Percentage	62.0%	38.0%
U.S. Representative before election
Peter Frelinghuysen Jr.
Republican
Elected U.S. Representative
Peter Frelinghuysen Jr.
Republican

This district included Somerset County and parts of Essex, Mercer, Middlesex, and Morris counties.

Republican incumbent Peter Frelinghuysen Jr. was re-elected to a twelfth term in office over Democratic nominee Frederick M. Bohen.

=== Republican primary ===
==== Candidates ====
- Peter Frelinghuysen Jr., incumbent representative since 1953

==== Results ====
1972 Republican primary
Party	Candidate	Votes	%
Republican	Peter Frelinghuysen Jr.	28,285	100.00%
Total votes		28,285	100.00%

=== Democratic primary ===
==== Candidates ====
- Frederick M. Bohen, television executive and former Lyndon B. Johnson administration staffer
- Robert C. Grant, former Toledo Blade reporter
- Christian J. Lund, former aide to U.S. Senator Harrison A. Williams

==== Results ====
1972 Democratic primary
Party	Candidate	Votes	%
Democratic	Frederick M. Bohen	9,227	49.22%
Democratic	Robert C. Grant	4,869	25.97%
Democratic	Christian J. Lund	4,650	24.81%
Total votes		18,746	100.00%

=== General election ===
==== Candidates ====
- Frederick M. Bohen, television executive and former Lyndon B. Johnson administration staffer (Democratic)
- Peter Frelinghuysen Jr., incumbent representative since 1953 (Republican)

==== Results ====
1972 U.S. House election
Party	Candidate	Votes	%	±%
Republican	Peter Frelinghuysen Jr. (inc.)	127,310	61.99%	
Democratic	Frederick M. Bohen	78,076	38.01%	
Total votes		205,386	100.00%	
Republican hold		Swing	{{{swing}}}	

== District 6 ==
1972 New Jersey's 6th congressional district election
- November 7, 1972
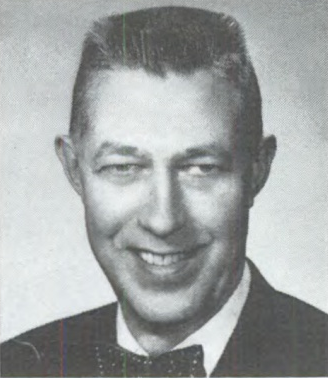

Nominee	Edwin B. Forsythe	Francis P. Brennan
Party	Republican	Democratic
Popular vote	123,610	71,113
Percentage	62.8%	36.1%
U.S. Representative before election
Edwin B. Forsythe
Republican
Elected U.S. Representative
Edwin B. Forsythe
Republican

This district included parts of Burlington, Camden, and Ocean counties.

Republican incumbent Edwin B. Forsythe was re-elected to a third term in office.

=== Republican primary ===
==== Candidates ====
- Edwin B. Forsythe, incumbent representative from Moorestown since 1970

==== Results ====
1972 Republican primary
Party	Candidate	Votes	%
Republican	Edwin B. Forsythe (incumbent)	21,207	100.00%
Total votes		21,207	100.00%

=== Democratic primary ===
==== Candidates ====
- John T. Adamczyk, Baptist minister and anti-war activist from Moorestown
- Jack A. Boye, Republican candidate for General Assembly in 1971 from Bay Head
- Francis P. Brennan, Burlington County sheriff
- Jerry N. Krader
- Wallace E. Turner

==== Results ====
1972 Democratic primary
Party	Candidate	Votes	%
Democratic	Francis P. Brennan	7,877	30.43%
Democratic	John T. Adamczyk	5,470	21.64%
Democratic	Jerry N. Krader	4,341	18.59%
Democratic	Wallace E. Turner	3,025	11.42%
Democratic	Jack A. Boye	2,180	10.28%
Total votes		22,893	100.00%

=== General election ===
==== Candidates ====
- Francis P. Brennan, Burlington County sheriff (Democratic)
- Bernardo S. Doganiero, perennial candidate (Socialist Labor)
- Ida C. Ebert (Independent for Congress)
- Edwin B. Forsythe, incumbent representative from Moorestown since 1970 (Republican)

==== Results ====
1972 U.S. House election
Party	Candidate	Votes	%	±%
Republican	Edwin B. Forsythe (incumbent)	123,610	62.80%	
Democratic	Francis P. Brennan	71,113	36.13%	
Independent	Ida C. Ebert	1,147	0.58%	
Socialist Labor	Bernardo S. Doganiero	951	0.48%	
Total votes		196,821	100.00%	
Republican hold		Swing	{{{swing}}}	

== District 7 ==
1972 New Jersey's 7th congressional district election
- November 7, 1972
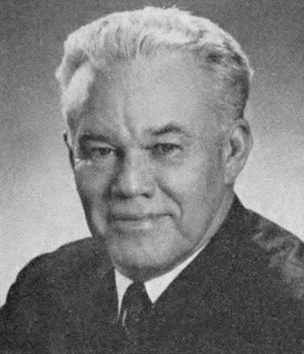

Nominee	William B. Widnall	Arthur J. Lesemann
Party	Republican	Democratic
Popular vote	124,365	85,712
Percentage	57.9%	39.9%
U.S. Representative before election
William B. Widnall
Republican
Elected U.S. Representative
William B. Widnall
Republican

This district included western parts of Bergen County.

Republican incumbent William B. Widnall was re-elected to a thirteen term in office over Democratic nominee Arthur J. Lesemann.

=== Republican primary ===
==== Candidates ====
- William B. Widnall, incumbent representative since 1950

==== Results ====
1972 Republican primary
Party	Candidate	Votes	%
Republican	William B. Widnall (incumbent)	17,778	100.00%
Total votes		17,778	100.00%

=== Democratic primary ===
==== Candidates ====
- Arthur J. Lesemann, attorney and nominee for this district in 1970

==== Results ====
1972 Democratic primary
Party	Candidate	Votes	%
Democratic	Arthur J. Lesemann	12,320	100.00%
Total votes		12,320	100.00%

=== General election ===
==== Candidates ====
- Arthur J. Lesemann, attorney and nominee for this district in 1970 (Democratic)
- Martin E. Wendelken, Glen Rock businessman (Independent)
- William B. Widnall, incumbent representative since 1950 (Republican)

==== Results ====
1972 U.S. House election
Party	Candidate	Votes	%	±%
Republican	William B. Widnall (incumbent)	124,365	57.94%	
Democratic	Arthur J. Lesemann	85,712	39.93%	
Independent	Martin Wendelken	4,557	2.12%	
Total votes		214,634	100.00%	
Republican hold		Swing	{{{swing}}}	

== District 8 ==
1972 New Jersey's 8th congressional district election
- November 7, 1972
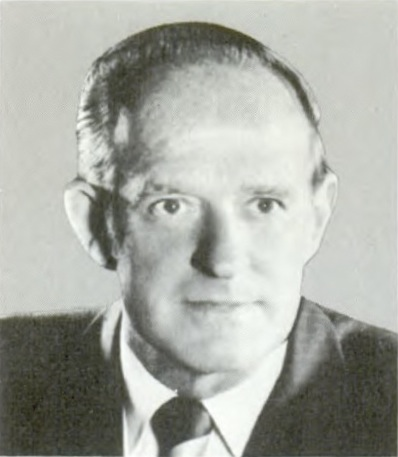

Nominee	Robert A. Roe	Walter Johnson
Party	Democratic	Republican
Popular vote	104,381	61,073
Percentage	63.1%	36.9%
U.S. Representative before election
Robert A. Roe
Democratic
Elected U.S. Representative
Robert A. Roe
Democratic

This district included parts of Bergen and Passaic counties.

Democratic incumbent Robert Roe was re-elected to a third term in office.

=== Democratic primary ===
==== Candidates ====
- Robert A. Roe, incumbent representative from Wayne since 1969

==== Results ====
1972 Democratic primary
Party	Candidate	Votes	%
Democratic	Robert A. Roe (incumbent)	11,979	100.00%
Total votes		11,979	100.00%

=== Republican primary ===
==== Candidates ====
- Walter E. Johnson, former member of the Totowa borough council

==== Results ====
1972 Republican primary
Party	Candidate	Votes	%
Republican	Walter E. Johnson	8,129	100.00%
Total votes		8,129	100.00%

=== General election ===
==== Candidates ====
- Walter E. Johnson, former member of the Totowa borough council (Republican)
- Robert A. Roe, incumbent representative from Wayne since 1969 (Democratic)

==== Results ====
1972 U.S. House election
Party	Candidate	Votes	%	±%
Democratic	Robert A. Roe (incumbent)	104,381	63.09%	
Republican	Walter E. Johnson	61,073	36.91%	
Total votes		165,454	100.00%	
Democratic hold		Swing	{{{swing}}}	

== District 9 ==
1972 New Jersey's 9th congressional district election
- November 7, 1972
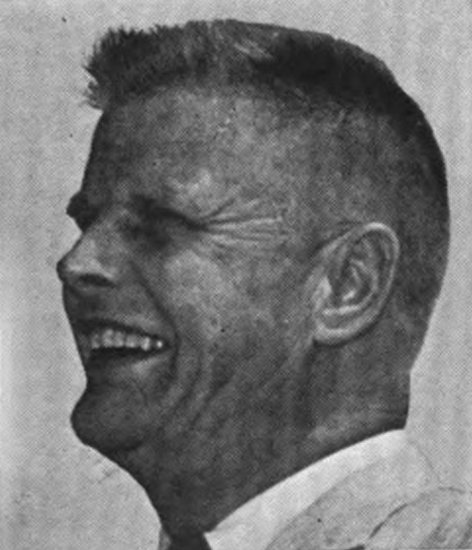

Nominee	Henry Helstoski	Alfred D. Schiaffo
Party	Democratic	Republican
Popular vote	119,543	94,747
Percentage	55.8%	44.2%
U.S. Representative before election
Henry Helstoski
Democratic
Elected U.S. Representative
Henry Helstoski
Democratic

This district consisted of parts of Bergen and Hudson counties.

Democratic incumbent Henry Helstoski was re-elected to a sixth term in office over Republican state Senator Alfred D. Schiaffo

=== Democratic primary ===
==== Candidates ====
- Henry Helstoski, incumbent representative since 1965 and candidate for governor in 1969

=== Results ===
1972 Democratic primary
Party	Candidate	Votes	%
Democratic	Henry Helstoski (incumbent)	24,740	100.00%
Total votes		24,740	100.00%

=== Republican primary ===
==== Candidates ====
- Hannibal Cundari, independent candidate for this district in 1970
- Alfred D. Schiaffo, state senator from Closter

==== Results ====
1972 Republican primary
Party	Candidate	Votes	%
Republican	Alfred D. Schiaffo	11,208	74.58%
Republican	Hannibal Cundari	3,821	25.42%
Total votes		15,029	100.00%

=== General election ===
==== Candidates ====
- Henry Helstoski, incumbent representative since 1965 and candidate for governor in 1969 (Democratic)
- Alfred D. Schiaffo, state senator from Closter (Republican)

==== Results ====
1972 U.S. House election
Party	Candidate	Votes	%	±%
Democratic	Henry Helstoski (incumbent)	119,543	55.79%	
Republican	Alfred D. Schiaffo	94,747	44.21%	
Total votes		214,290	100.00%	
Democratic hold		Swing	{{{swing}}}	

== District 10 ==
1972 New Jersey's 10th congressional district election
- November 7, 1972
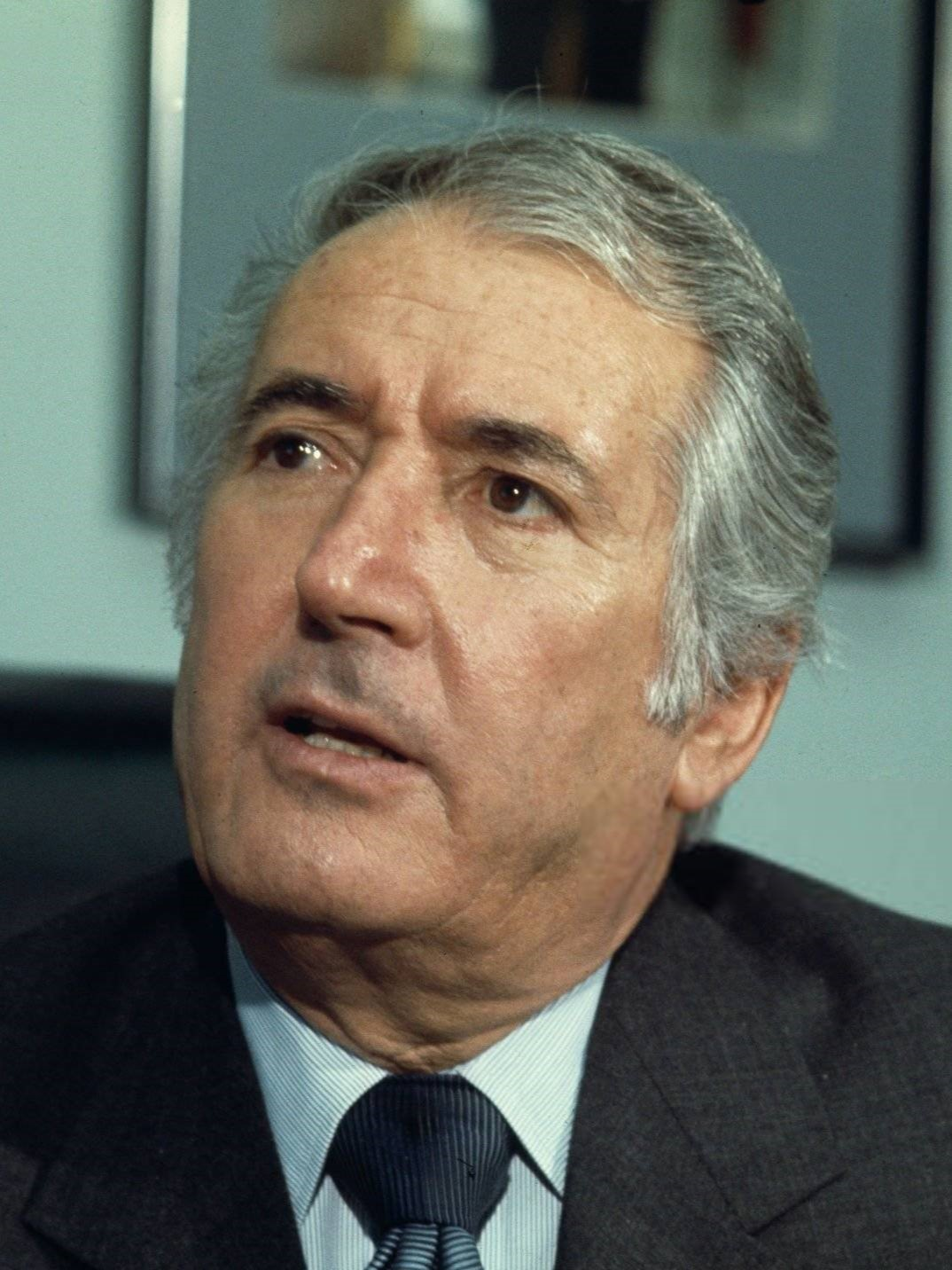

Nominee	Peter W. Rodino	Kenneth C. Miller
Party	Democratic	Republican
Popular vote	53,094	9,936
Percentage	79.7%	20.3%
U.S. Representative before election
Peter W. Rodino
Democratic
Elected U.S. Representative
Peter W. Rodino
Democratic

The district included parts of Essex and Hudson counties.

Democratic incumbent Peter W. Rodino was re-elected to a thirteenth term in office.

=== Democratic primary ===
==== Candidates ====
- William S. Hart Sr., mayor of East Orange
- Wilbur Kornegay Jr.
- George C. Richardson, assemblyman from Newark
- Peter W. Rodino, incumbent representative since 1949

===== Results =====
- Patrick J. McBride

==== Results ====
1972 Democratic primary
Party	Candidate	Votes	%
Democratic	Peter W. Rodino (incumbent)	37,650	57.42%
Democratic	William S. Hart Sr.	24,118	36.78%
Democratic	George C. Richardson	3,086	4.71%
Democratic	Wilbur Kornegay Jr.	718	1.09%
Total votes		65,572	100.00%

=== Republican primary ===
==== Candidates ====
- Kenneth C. Miller, East Orange motor vehicle agent

==== Results ====
1972 Republican primary
Party	Candidate	Votes	%
Republican	Kenneth C. Miller	3,706	100.00%
Total votes		3,706	100.00%

=== General election ===
==== Candidates ====
- Kenneth C. Miller, East Orange motor vehicle agent (Republican)
- Peter W. Rodino, incumbent representative since 1949 (Democratic)

==== Results ====
1972 U.S. House election
Party	Candidate	Votes	%	±%
Democratic	Peter W. Rodino (incumbent)	94,308	79.75%	
Republican	Kenneth C. Miller	23,949	20.25%	
Total votes		118,257	100.00%	
Democratic hold		Swing	{{{swing}}}	

== District 11 ==
1972 New Jersey's 11th congressional district election
- November 7, 1972
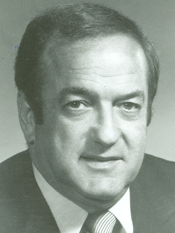

Nominee	Joseph Minish	Milton Waldor
Party	Democratic	Republican
Popular vote	120,277	82,957
Percentage	57.5%	39.7%
U.S. Representative before election
Joseph Minish
Democratic
Elected U.S. Representative
Joseph Minish
Democratic

This district consisted of parts of Bergen, Essex, Passaic, and Union counties.

Democratic incumbent Joseph Minish was re-elected to a seventh term in office over Republican state Senator Milton Waldor.

=== Democratic primary ===
==== Candidates ====
- Joseph Minish, incumbent representative from West Orange since 1963

==== Results ====
1972 Democratic primary
Party	Candidate	Votes	%
Democratic	Joseph Minish (incumbent)	26,065	100.00%
Total votes		26,065	100.00%

=== Republican primary ===
==== Candidates ====
- Milton Waldor, state senator from West Orange

==== Results ====
1972 Republican primary
Party	Candidate	Votes	%
Republican	Milton Waldor	17,265	100.00%
Total votes		17,265	100.00%

=== General election ===
==== Candidates ====
- James R. Klimaski (People's)
- Joseph Minish, incumbent representative from West Orange since 1963 (Democratic)
- Philip R. Nicolaus (American Independent Conservative)
- Milton Waldor, state senator from West Orange (Republican)

==== Results ====
1972 U.S. House election
Party	Candidate	Votes	%	±%
Democratic	Joseph Minish (incumbent)	120,277	57.52%	
Republican	Milton Waldor	82,957	39.67%	
Independent	Philip R. Nicolaus	3,077	1.47%	
People's Party (United States, 1971)	James R. Klimaski	2,791	1.33%	
Total votes		209,102	100.00%	
Democratic hold		Swing	{{{swing}}}	

== District 12 ==
1972 New Jersey's 12th congressional district election
- November 7, 1972
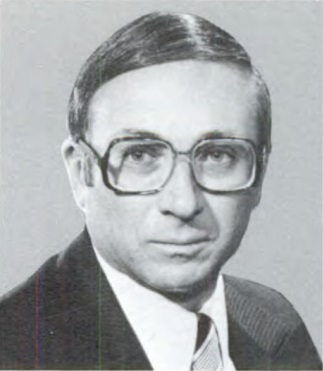

Nominee	Matt Rinaldo	Jerry F. English
Party	Republican	Democratic
Popular vote	127,690	72,758
Percentage	63.5%	36.2%
U.S. Representative before election
Florence P. Dwyer
Republican
Elected U.S. Representative
Matt Rinaldo
Republican

This district included parts of Union County.

Republican incumbent Florence P. Dwyer did not run for a ninth term in office. Republican state senator Matthew J. Rinaldo won the open seat over Democratic nominee Jerry English.

=== Republican primary ===
==== Candidates ====
- Matt Rinaldo, state senator from Union Township

===== Declined =====
- Florence P. Dwyer, incumbent representative since 1957

==== Results ====
1972 Republican primary
Party	Candidate	Votes	%
Republican	Matt Rinaldo (incumbent)	19,576	100.00%
Total votes		19,576	100.00%

=== Democratic primary ===
==== Candidates ====
- Jerry Fitzgerald English, state senator from Summit
- Richard I. Samuel, Westfield attorney

==== Results ====
1972 Democratic primary
Party	Candidate	Votes	%
Democratic	Jerry Fitzgerald English	18,396	67.88%
Democratic	Richard I. Samuel	8,706	32.12%
Total votes		27,102	100.00%

=== General election ===
==== Candidates ====
- Stanley Bogus (Independent)
- Jerry Fitzgerald English, state senator from Summit (Democratic)
- Matt Rinaldo, incumbent representative from Union since 1973 (Republican)

==== Results ====
1972 U.S. House election
Party	Candidate	Votes	%	±%
Republican	Matt Rinaldo (incumbent)	127,690	63.47%	
Democratic	Jerry Fitzgerald English	72,758	36.17%	
Independent	Stanley Bogus	731	0.36%	
Total votes		201,179	100.00%	
Republican hold		Swing	{{{swing}}}	

== District 13 ==
1972 New Jersey's 13th congressional district election
- November 7, 1972
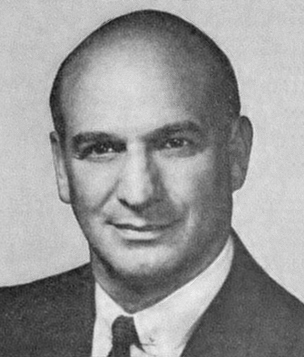

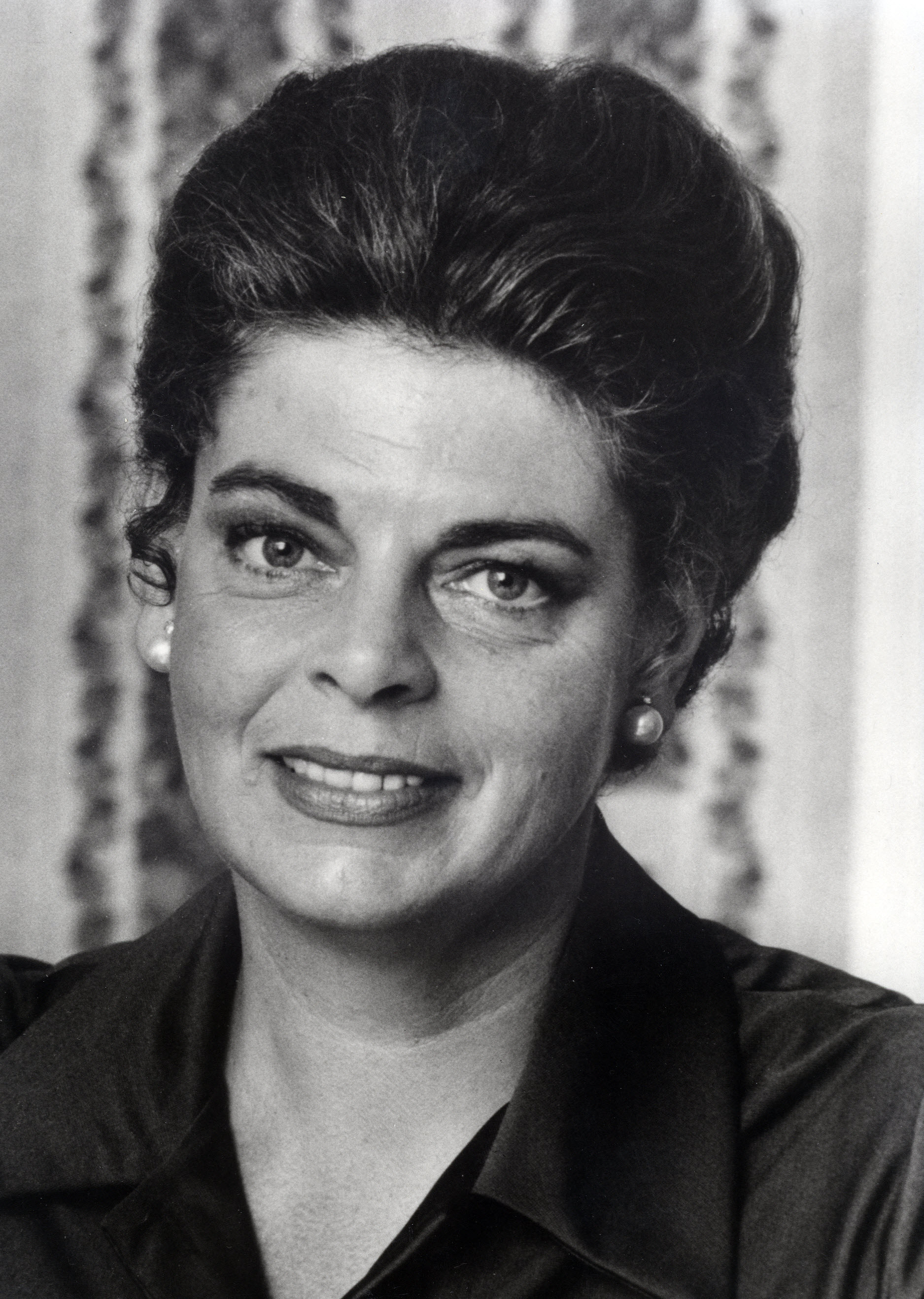
Nominee	Joseph Maraziti	Helen Stevenson Meyner
Party	Republican	Democratic
Popular vote	109,640	84,492
Percentage	55.7%	42.9%
Elected U.S. Representative
Joseph Maraziti
Republican

This sprawling district included Hunterdon, Sussex, and Warren counties and parts of Mercer and Morris counties.

This seat did not have an incumbent; the legislature specifically drew it for Republican state senator Joseph J. Maraziti to run. In the open race, Maraziti defeated Helen Stevenson Meyner, the former First Lady of New Jersey.

=== Republican primary ===
==== Candidates ====
- Walter C. Keogh-Dwyer, assemblyman from Newton
- Joseph Maraziti, state senator from Boonton
- Delmar D. Miller Sr.
- Karl Weidel, assemblyman from Pennington

==== Results ====
1972 Republican primary
Party	Candidate	Votes	%
Republican	Joseph Maraziti	14,696	49.88%
Republican	Walter C. Keogh-Dwyer	7,491	25.42%
Republican	Karl Weidel	4,930	16.73%
Republican	Delmar D. Miller Sr.	2,344	7.96%
Total votes		29,461	100.00%

=== Democratic primary ===
==== Candidates ====
- Norma Herzfeld
- Jerome C. Kessler
- Joseph P. O'Doherty, state vice chair of the Robert F. Kennedy 1968 presidential campaign

==== Results ====
1972 Democratic primary
Party	Candidate	Votes	%
Democratic	Joseph P. O'Doherty	7,265	47.35%
Democratic	Jerome Kessler	6,017	25.56%
Democratic	Norma Herzfeld	3,808	17.95%
Total votes		17,090	100.00%

==== Aftermath ====
After the primary, O'Doherty was found ineligible to run after a court ruled that he had not been a United States citizen for the minimum of seven years. Former First Lady of New Jersey Helen Stevenson Meyner, from Phillipsburg, was selected as a replacement nominee.

=== General election ===
==== Candidates ====
- Samuel Golub (Independent Conservative)
- Joseph Maraziti, incumbent representative since 1973 (Republican)
- Helen Stevenson Meyner, former First Lady of New Jersey (Democratic)

==== Results ====
1972 U.S. House election
Party	Candidate	Votes	%	±%
Republican	Joseph Maraziti	109,640	55.67%	
Democratic	Helen S. Meyner	84,492	42.90%	
Independent	Samuel Golub	2,826	1.43%	
Total votes		196,958	100.00%	
Republican hold		Swing	{{{swing}}}	

== District 14 ==
1972 New Jersey's 14th congressional district election
- November 7, 1972
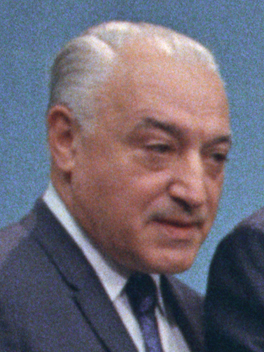

Nominee	Dominick V. Daniels	Richard T. Bozzone
Party	Democratic	Republican
Popular vote	103,089	57,683
Percentage	64.2%	34.3%
U.S. Representative before election
Neil Gallagher (District 13)
Dominick V. Daniels (District 14)
Democratic
Elected U.S. Representative
Dominick V. Daniels
Democratic

This district included parts of Hudson County.

As a result of redistricting, both Dominick V. Daniels and Neil Gallagher stood in the Democratic primary for this district as incumbents. Gallagher was indicted before the primary campaign, leading the Hudson County Democratic organization to endorse Daniels. Daniels defeated Gallagher and West New York Mayor Anthony DeFino in the primary and won the general election with little difficulty.

=== Democratic primary ===
==== Candidates ====
- Dominick V. Daniels, incumbent representative since 1959
- Anthony M. DeFino, mayor of West New York
- Vincent J. Dellay, former representative
- Neil Gallagher, incumbent representative since 1959

==== Campaign ====
In April, Gallagher was indicted by a federal grand jury in Newark. The indictment led the Hudson County Democratic organization to endorse Daniels, leaving Gallagher without party support. Instead, Daniels's main opponent in the primary was West New York Mayor Anthony DeFino, who was part of an emerging reformist coalition within the county led by Jersey City Mayor Paul T. Jordan, who had won a special election in November 1971. The Jordan organization saw the primary as an opportunity to defeat the last vestiges of the old Frank Hague political machine, which had been declining in Jersey City for years.

==== Results ====
1972 Democratic primary
Party	Candidate	Votes	%
Democratic	Dominick V. Daniels (inc.)	34,631	50.79%
Democratic	Anthony M. DeFino	21,969	32.22%
Democratic	Neil Gallagher (incumbent)	10,392	15.24%
Democratic	Vincent J. Dellay	1,194	1.75%
Total votes		68,186	100.00%

=== Republican primary ===
==== Candidates ====
- Benjamin Bartoszak
- Richard T. Bozzone

==== Results ====
1972 Republican primary
Party	Candidate	Votes	%
Republican	Richard T. Bozzone	3,621	78.11%
Republican	Benjamin Bartoszak	1,015	21.89%
Total votes		4,636	100.00%

=== General election ===
==== Candidates ====
- Richard T. Bozzone (Republican)
- Vincent J. Carrino (People over Politics)
- Dominick V. Daniels, incumbent representative since 1959 (Democratic)
- Perfecto Oyola (Protest, Progress, Dignity)
- Edward F. Zampella (Concerned and Capable)

==== Results ====
1972 U.S. House election
Party	Candidate	Votes	%	±%
Democratic	Dominick V. Daniels (inc.)	103,089	61.23%	
Republican	Richard T. Bozzone	57,683	34.26%	
Independent	Edward F. Zampella	5,188	3.08%	
Independent	Perfecto Oyola	1,556	0.92%	
Independent	Vincent J. Carrino	847	0.50%	
Total votes		168,363	100.00%	
Democratic hold		Swing	{{{swing}}}	

== District 15 ==
1972 New Jersey's 15th congressional district election
- November 7, 1972
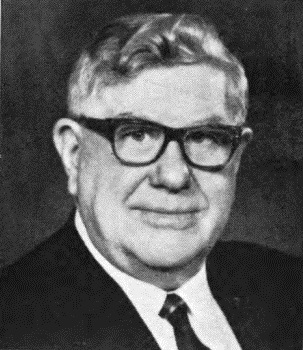

Nominee	Edward J. Patten	Fuller H. Brooks
Party	Democratic	Republican
Popular vote	98,155	89,400
Percentage	52.3%	47.7%
U.S. Representative before election
Edward J. Patten
Democratic
Elected U.S. Representative
Edward J. Patten
Democratic

This district included parts of Middlesex and Union counties.

Democratic incumbent Edward J. Patten was re-elected to a sixth term in office.

=== Democratic primary ===
==== Candidates ====
- Edward J. Patten, incumbent representative since 1963

==== Results ====
1972 Democratic primary
Party	Candidate	Votes	%
Democratic	Edward J. Patten (incumbent)	20,514	100.00%
Total votes		20,514	100.00%

=== Republican primary ===
==== Candidates ====
- Fuller T. Brooks, former FBI agent and candidate for Edison township council

==== Results ====
1972 Republican primary
Party	Candidate	Votes	%
Republican	Fuller H. Brooks	5,894	100.00%
Total votes		5,894	100.00%

=== General election ===
==== Candidates ====
- Fuller T. Brooks, former FBI agent and candidate for Edison township council (Republican)
- Edward J. Patten, incumbent representative since 1963 (Democratic)

==== Results ====
1972 U.S. House election
Party	Candidate	Votes	%	±%
Democratic	Edward J. Patten	98,155	52.33%	
Republican	Fuller H. Brooks	89,400	47.67%	
Total votes		187,555	100.00%	
Democratic hold		Swing	{{{swing}}}	
