= Daily Collegian =

Independent student newspaper of the Pennsylvania State University

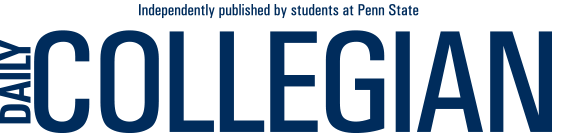

- Front page of the Daily Collegian on January 16, 2020
- Type: Student newspaper
- Format: Broadsheet
- School: Pennsylvania State University
- Owner: Collegian Inc.
- Editor-in-chief: Mercedes Hamilton
- Managing editor: Avery Tortora, Kahlie Wray
- News editor: Mia Debelevich, Rachael Keller
- Opinion editor: Teresa Phelan
- Photo editor: Samantha Oropeza, Matt Cropp
- Staff writers: 130
- Founded: April 18, 1887; 139 years ago
- Language: English
- Headquarters: Willard Building
- City: State College, Pennsylvania, U.S.
- Country: United States
- Circulation: 5,000 (as of Feb. 2020)
- ISSN: 1099-1875
- Website: psucollegian.com
- Free online archives: collegian.psu.edu/pdf

The Daily Collegian is a student-produced news outlet, with a newspaper and website, that is published independently at the Pennsylvania State University. The newspaper is printed once a week during the fall and spring semesters, and not at all during the summer semester. It is distributed for free at Penn State University Park, the university's main campus, and mailed to paid subscribers across the country.

Collegian Inc., which publishes the Daily Collegian, is an independent, nonprofit corporation and has a board of directors that is composed of faculty, students, and professionals. The mission statement of Collegian Inc. is "to publish a quality campus newspaper and to provide a rewarding educational experience for the student staff members." It has EIN 24-0861373 as a 501(c)(3) Public Charity; in 2024 it claimed $592,814 in total revenue and total assets of $1,603,769.

The Daily Collegian has historically been considered one of the top student-run college newspapers in the United States receiving multiple notable journalism awards including National Pacemaker Awards, top rankings from The Princeton Review, and Sigma Delta Chi Awards.

The Daily Collegian traces its founding back to the Free Lance, a monthly student magazine published by students and faculty of Pennsylvania State University, which began printing in April 1887. The Free Lance struggled structurally and financially eventually disbanding in April 1904. The next semester, in October 1904, the State Collegian emerged with much of the same leadership as the previous publication. The name of the publication was changed to the Penn State Collegian in 1911, and the paper began publishing on a semi-weekly basis in September 1920. The success of semi-weekly printing lead the paper to began publishing daily in 1940, changing its name to the Daily Collegian.

In 1996, the Daily Collegian began pursuing a larger digital presence, creating The Digital Collegian in 1996, the publications website that provides online access to articles digitally and print stories dating from 1988 to the present. Daily printing continued until 2017, when the Daily Collegian announced it would move away from printing five days a week and would instead print twice a week, on Mondays and Thursdays. The shift was made as a majority of the publication's readership was coming from its online publication.

== History ==
=== The Free Lance ===
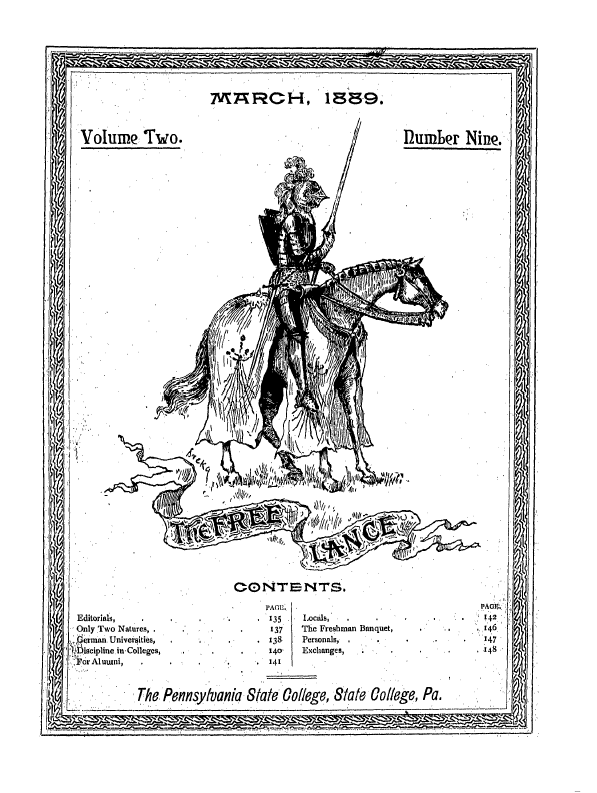
The decorative cover of the first issue of the Free Lance in 1889

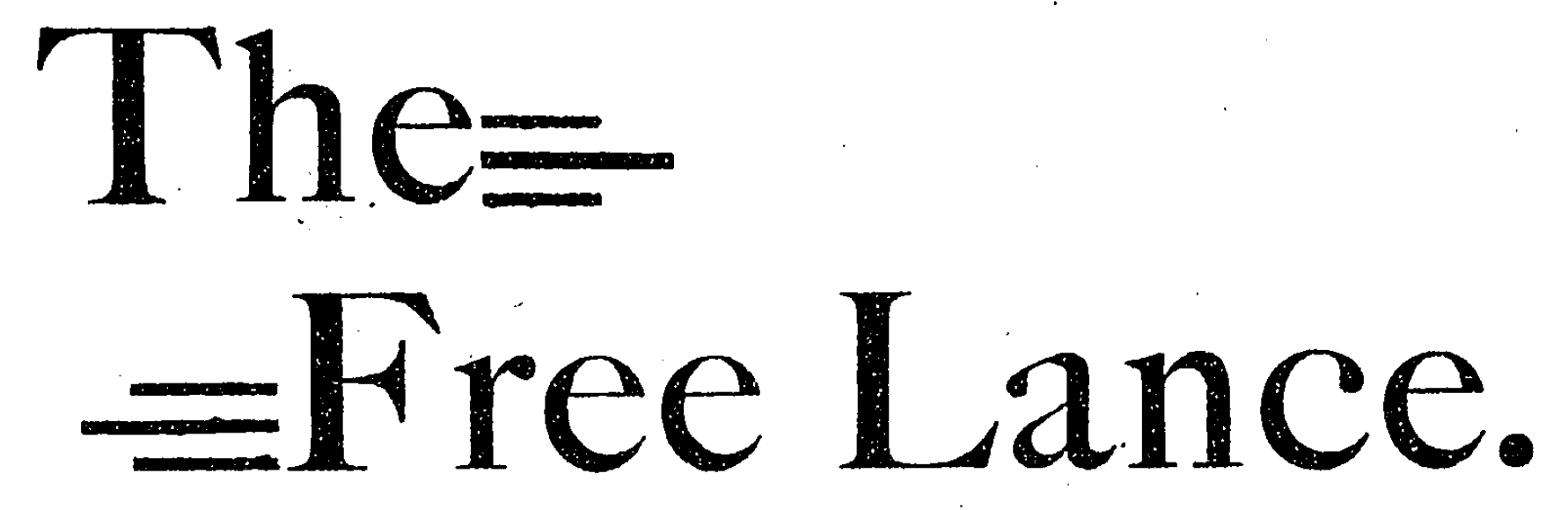
The logo for The Free Lance, a student publication at Penn State University

The Free Lance was a monthly news magazine at Pennsylvania State University, which was first published in April 1887. The first copies of the Free Lance were shipped to State College, Pennsylvania by the Bellefonte Central train. The arrival of the first issue of the publication was celebrated by a large group of students who waited for the train and paraded down College Avenue in Downtown State College to purchase their copy. The first issue of the news magazine was twelve pages long and was sold for fifteen cents a copy.

Most of the articles inside of the Free Lance were opinion pieces on national events penned by professors and alumni of the university. Much of the news coverage coming from the publication had already become public knowledge by the time each monthly edition was released. The Free Lance mostly took an approach to filling in holes in stories and giving opinion on events rather than reporting them first hand.

In 1895, the Free Lance transitioned away from news and moved its focus to become a literary magazine publishing essays, poems and short stories. This move lead the already cash strapped publication to collapse. In April 1901, as subscribers declined the Free Lance begged for support from the university, students, and alumni to continue its publication. Throughout the next three years editors continued to asks for financial support and payment from delinquent subscribers. The requests were not met and the magazine concluded publication with its April 1904 edition, which did not appear on campus until May of that year.

=== The State Collegian ===
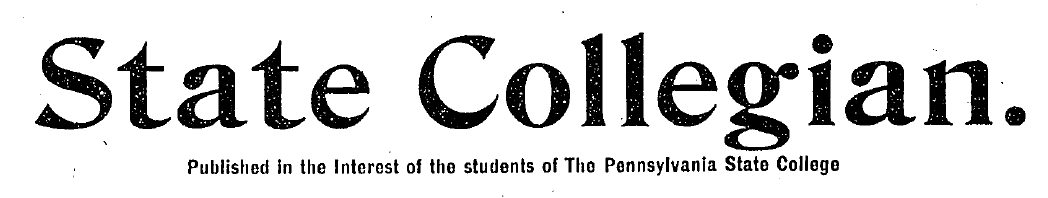
The logo of The State Collegian, a student publication at Penn State University

The semester after publication ceased on the Free Lance, its former editor and much of the former periodical's staff founded the State Collegian, a weekly newspaper. The newspaper was established independent of the university's control and produced its first issue in October 1904. In its first edition the State Collegiain editor William B. Hoke penned an editorial outlining the decline of the Free Lance and how the new paper would be different. Hoke outlined a mission to have a paper that contained news and events from around the community citing the failure of its predecessor to its shift away from news based content.

The paper was published once a week on Thursdays, added photos and began printing in broadsheet form rather than on tabloid-size paper. The paper was printed by Nittany Printing and Publishing Co., publishers of the State College Times, now the Centre Daily Times, where the State Collegian shared a downtown office with the State College paper.

=== Penn State Collegian ===
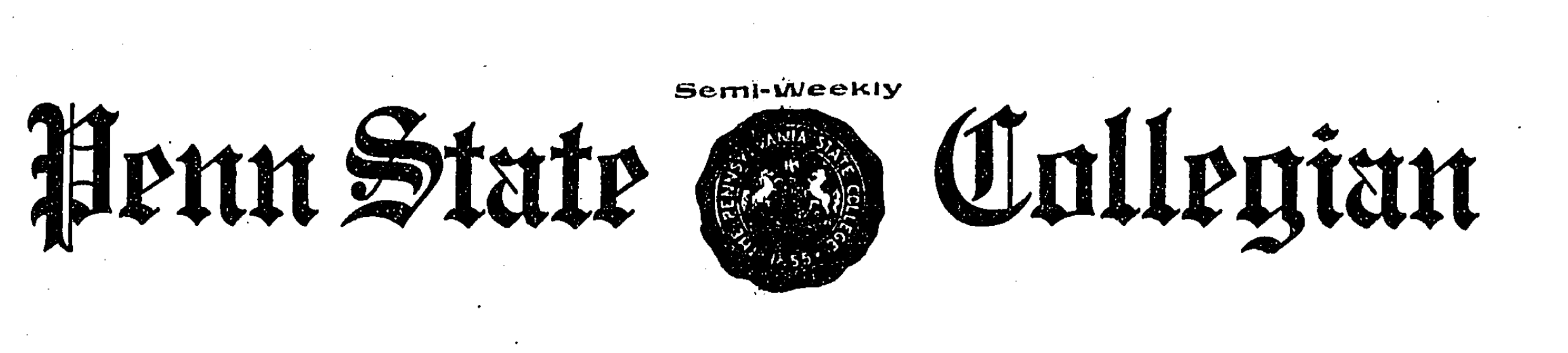
A logo for the State Collegian, a student publication at Penn State University

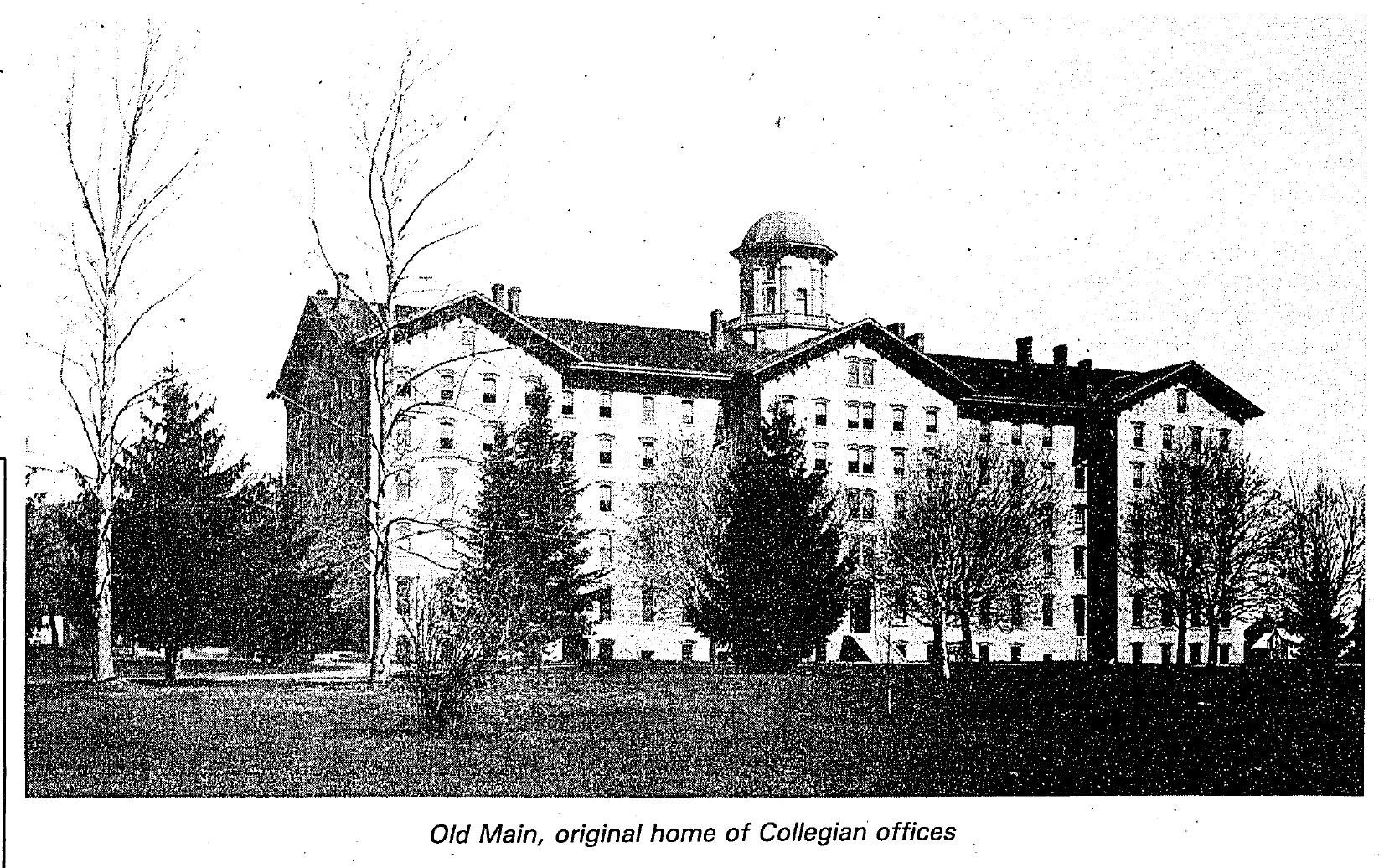
An undated photograph of the original version of Old Main at Penn State

In 1911, the State Collegian made the decision to change its masthead and publication name to Penn State Collegian to be more definite and expressive of its location and mission to report on the university and student issues.

In 1914, a subscriptions to the Penn State Collegian cost $1.50 per year. Printing of the publication was interrupted because of materials shortages caused by World War I during the fall semester of 1918. The publication began printing its paper semi-weekly, publishing Tuesday and Friday editions In the fall semester of 1920. Reporters covered all aspects of daily life as well as global events.

In 1930, the State Collegian moved its offices to "Journalism Alley," on the third floor of Old Main.

=== Daily Collegian ===
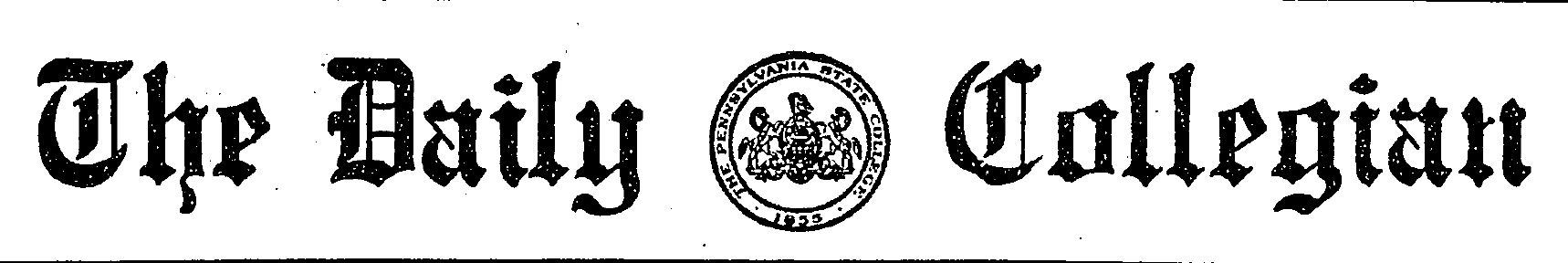
A logo for the Daily Collegian, the student newspaper at Penn State University

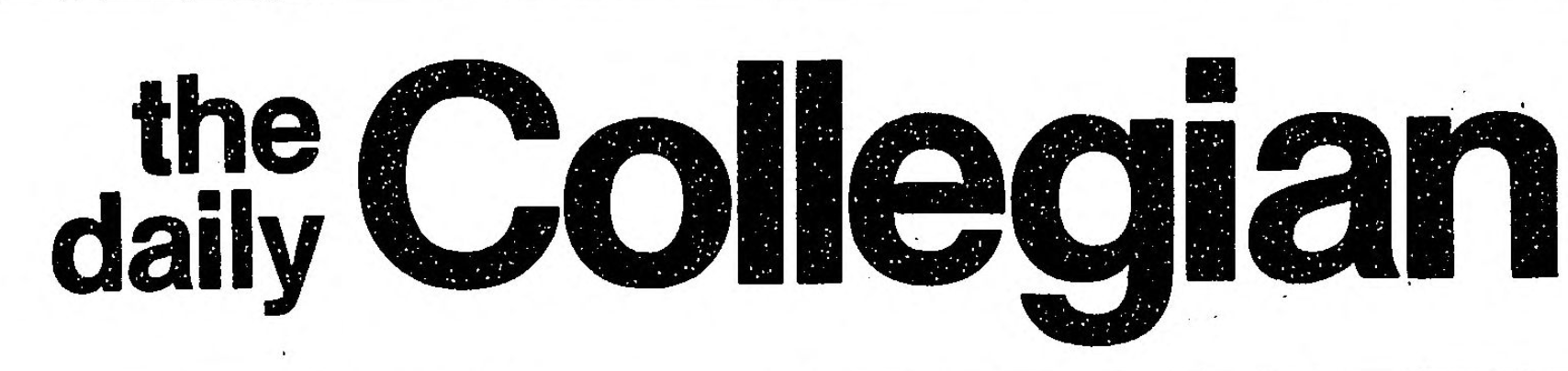
The logo the Daily Collegian used in the 1980s

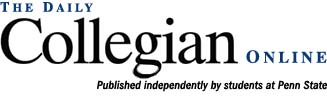
The current Daily Collegian logo

Collegian editors with Gov. Thornburgh in 1984

After the publishers of the Penn State Collegian approved a move to begin printing the newspaper daily the masthead of the paper was changed to the Daily Collegian. The publication began publishing five days a week, Tuesday through Saturday. During this transition the publishing offices of the paper were moved to the basement of the Carnegie Library, now known as the Carnegie Building. The first issue of the newly daily paper was published on September 5, 1940. More than a year after making the switch to daily print, Japan bombed Pearl Harbor and the U.S. entered World War II. The Daily Collegian cut production days due to wartime rationing and shortages of materials printing weekly instead of daily from 1944 until the beginning of 1947.

In 1956, the Daily Collegian became a member of the Associated Press, submitting their stories to the wire service for publication at other member papers.

In 1961, the Collegian moved to 20 Sackett Building.

In 1972, the Collegian moved its office location to 126 Carnegie. In 1979, the Daily Collegian earned the Associated Collegiate Press' Five Marks of Distinction for the second consecutive rating period. The same year, the paper started production on The Weekly Collegian.

==== Digital era ====
In a move to the digital era the Collegian launched its first website, The Digital Collegian, in the summer of 1996. This allowed the paper to deliver news articles online and improve access to digitized articles from its historical print issues.

Beginning with the Fall 2006 semester, the Digital Collegian was renamed the Daily Collegian Online and debuted a new home page layout. A Web department was formed with the purpose of creating online updates for breaking news and posting stories on days when classes were not in session.

Along with this launch came a project to digitize and make publicly accessible all issues of the Free Lance, State Collegian, Penn State Collegian and the Daily Collegian through 1922. At the time, Collegian Inc. owned some of the last remaining paper copies of the Free Lance but the copies had yet to be scanned to microfilm to preserve them. Penn State's Libraries Special Collections/University Archives, Preservation and Digitization Department, and News and Microforms Library met with Collegian Inc. in spring of 2003 to discuss digitizing the last remaining copies. At the time only researchers, alumni, and students had access to historical print issues through bound issue books located at the University Archives. The proposed project set out to scan all issues April 1887-August 2, 1940, in total 16,000 page images, in a year or less. In spring of 2004, one year from the universities initial meeting with Collegian Inc., the 1887-1940 segment was completed and made publicly accessible online.

After the success of the initial project Collegian, Inc. granted permission to digitize all issues through 1988. The second scanning project was completed over four years, making in total 132,736 total pages publicly available in 2008. Penn State's Library provided all funding for conversion, software/hardware, on-going maintenance and upgrades. The project came in at a cost of $178,541.

The University Libraries allowed Google to crawl its database starting in 2007, making historical content searchable. With this came multiple lawsuits as formerly inaccessible articles on arrest and disciplinary reports became easily accessible to the public.

In July 2010, in what was called a highly unusual move, two Centre County, Pennsylvania judges, Judge Bradley P. Lunsford and Judge Thomas King Kistler, ordered the Daily Collegian and the Centre Daily Times to delete archived news stories about five defendants in criminal cases after a lawyer sought to have the records expunged. The orders were obtained by State College lawyer Joe Amendola, who was quoted in The Philadelphia Inquirer, saying, “What's the sense in having your record expunged if anyone can Google you and it comes up?” The five defendants had either pled guilty to criminal charges ranging from aggravated indecent assault to possession of marijuana, or completed pretrial diversion programs that resulted in no finding of guilt. Amendola said that an earlier client was having trouble finding employment despite having her criminal record expunged. Prospective employers Googled her name and found a 1992 Collegian article detailing her crime.

The expungement orders were eventually revised to remove any reference to the Centre Daily Times and the Daily Collegian on July 8, 2010. Judge Thomas Kistler told The Philadelphia Inquirer, "It was never anybody's intention to restrict [the papers].” Kistler Acknowledged the strong protections given the news media by the First Amendment, saying, "I can't tell them what to do." Kistler claimed court officials had not noticed that the newspapers were on the list of expungement orders sought by lawyer Amendola. "It was a breakdown under the rush of the system," Kistler said.

==== Arrest of photographer ====
A riot broke out in downtown State College, Pennsylvania on October 25, 2008, after no. 3 Penn State Football defeated no. 10 Ohio State Football 13-6. Daily Collegian photographer, Michael Felletter, was on assignment documenting the riot when he was arrested by police officers after he allegedly did not comply with orders to leave the area. Felletter was charged with failure to disperse, a second-degree misdemeanor, and disorderly conduct, a third-degree misdemeanor.

Police alleged Felletter's presence had caused the crowd to become more exuberant, excited, and destructive. Felletter alleged that officers expressed no problem with him being there and that he was only asked to leave the scene of the riot once by an officer Argiro. Felletter denied police charges that he refused to leave the scene when asked. He alleged the same officer Argiro threatened him with pepper spray and arrest, and when he continued to take pictures of Argiro over his shoulder as he was leaving the scene.

Felletter was represented pro bono on behalf of the American Civil Liberties Union. Centre County District Attorney, Michael Madeira, claimed that the case centered around Felletter's refusal to obey a police order and not around the First Amendment or the photographer's journalistic activity. The Magisterial District Judge Carmine Prestia dismissed Felletter's disorderly conduct charge saying the crowd's actions were not Felletter's fault. The judge also dismissed all of the counts of failure to disperse but one, saying a sole charge was sufficient claiming the press is not above the law.

Felletter lawyer argued coverage of the riot was valuable to both citizens and the government and that these charges violated the second amendment. Felletter lawyer cited the State College Police use of Felletter's photographs in facilitating the identification of others involved in the riot who were ultimately prosecuted. Centre County Judge David E. Grine dismissed the remaining charge, failure to disperse, against the photographer citing "unclear" evidence. Grine ruled it is uncertain whether Felletter's compliance with police orders to "move along" was adequate when he moved from the street to sidewalk. Additionally, Grine blamed the rioters for their behavior—not Felletter, according to the ruling. After initially requesting an appeal, Centre County District Attorney Stacy Parks Miller filed a motion to drop the appeal.

==== The Collegian Chronicles ====
The book, The Collegian Chronicles: A History of Penn State from the Pages of The Daily Collegian (1887-2006) was published by the Collegian Alumni Interest Group and edited by Marv Krasnansky in 2006. It includes a detailed history of Penn State life told by more than 90 former Collegian members, including editors, reporters and business managers.

==== The Paper ====
The Daily Collegian is the subject of a documentary film called The Paper. The film was directed by Aaron Matthews, who used the student newspaper as a case study for the problems that face all newspapers today—flagging circulation, minority coverage, and access to sources. The film made official selection at multiple festivals, including the 2007 Philadelphia Film Festival.

The film was co-produced by Aaron Matthews and the Independent Television Service and had major funding from the Corporation for Public Broadcasting. Distribution for the film was carried out by Icarus Films.

Released and distributed in 2007, the documentary was filmed from 2004-2005 and followed the newspaper while Editor-in-Chief James Young ran the staff.

Cinematography for the film was done by Wayne De La Roche and the music was composed by Tim Nackashi.

The Birmingham Weekly called it "An insightful new documentary", and the Boston Globe reported that, "What we see at the Collegian is a resonant microcosm: This paper's crucible is every paper's."

==== James Building demolition ====
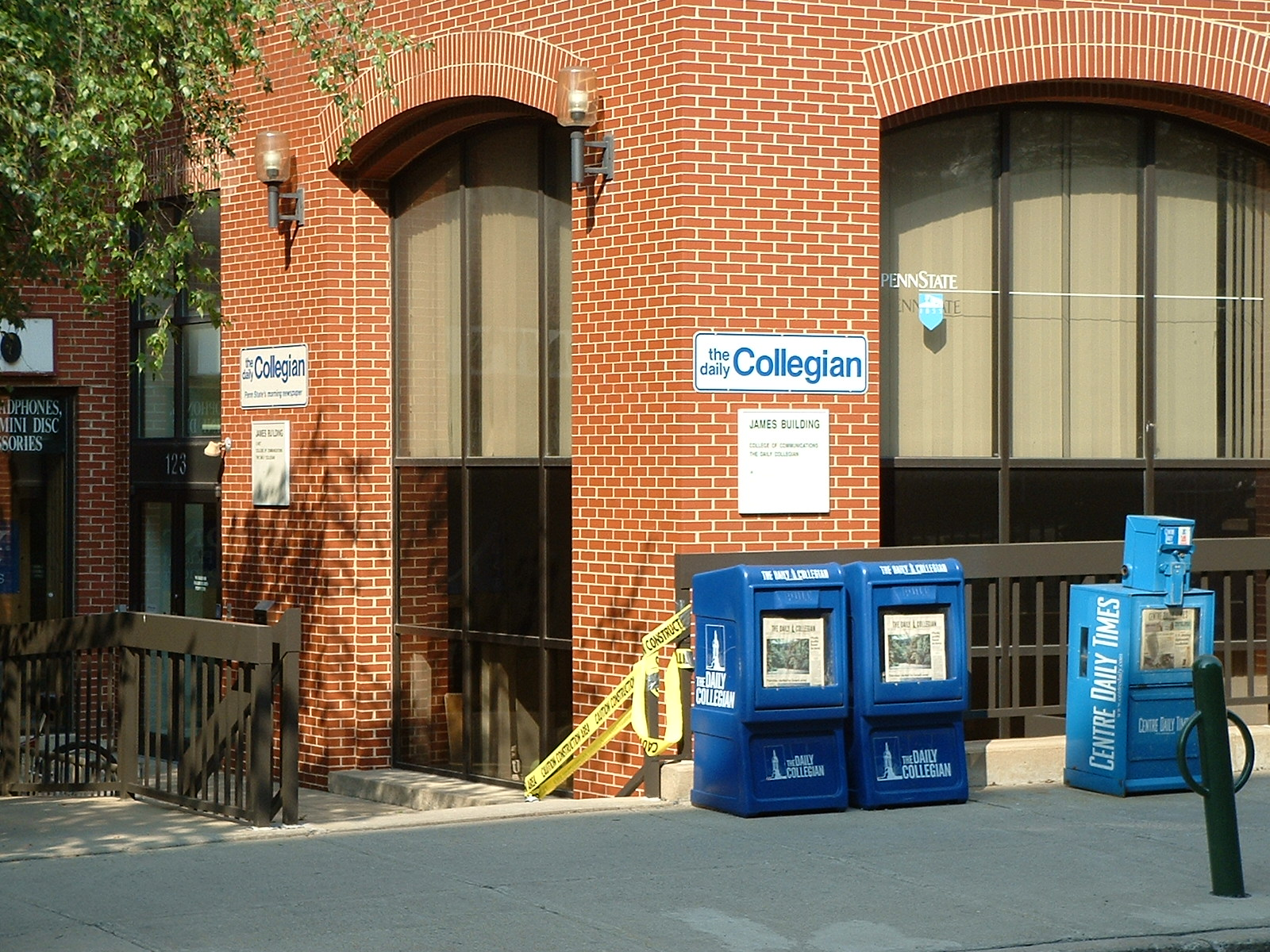
The James Building at Penn State, home of the Daily Collegian

On November 29, 2018, after 30 years of being based in the James Building, a university-owned property in downtown State College, Pennsylvania, the Daily Collegian announced a plan to move into the new Donald P. Bellisario Media Center, which was planned to open in the fall of 2020 at the site of the Willard Building.

Penn State had announced plans earlier in the year their plan to demolish the 100-year James Building located at 121-123 S. Burrowes St. and replace it with a $52.8 million building that, "Will serve as a hub for the Invent Penn State entrepreneurial and innovation initiative,".

The space The Collegian is slated to move to will be in a closed, 852-square-foot corner of its third floor. The private "Collegian Suite," will face a large open newsroom with designated desk space for the newspaper. However, some other student news organizations have been invited to utilize said newsroom as well.

In fall 2019, the James Building was demolished and The Collegian moved its office to Midtown Square, another university-owned property in downtown State College. The media center is scheduled for completion in fall 2020 and ready for student and faculty and students to begin working there in spring 2021.

==== Coronavirus ====
On January 24, 2020 Penn State announced it was monitoring an outbreak of COVID-19 as it began to spread inside of the United States. In February, Penn State restricted travel to China, Italy, and Japan, and required students returning from CDC level 3 threat countries to be quarantined. During Spring Break, on March 11, 2020, as the COVID-19 pandemic was becoming a threat in the United States, Penn State canceled all in-person classes at its 20 campuses until at least April 3 which was later extended to the remainder of their spring and summer semesters. Students and faculty were asked to stay home, and away from campus because of the outbreak. The Print Edition of The Daily Collegian, printed bi-weekly, was suspended and all news coverage was posted digitally.

=== Newspaper Burning ===
In 1993, the paper criticized the Society for Professional Journalists after it offered a $250 reward for information on the persons who stole half a conservative campus newspaper's run, burning part of it. The Collegian said the thieves were engaging in constitutionally protected speech.

== Collegian publications ==
- The Daily Collegian

The print newspaper publication is printed on Thursday to be circulated on Fridays while classes are in session in the fall and spring. No issues are published on the week of Thanksgiving or the week of spring break. The paper is distributed on the University Park campus. The paper mostly covers local, state, national and international events and news pertaining to Penn State as well as Penn State sports and opinion columns.

- The Daily Collegian Online

The Collegian's website includes all content created for the outlet. This includes digital copies of the print edition, all articles published, video, photo, podcasts, as well as a searchable archive.

- Daily Collegian video production

== Notable alumni ==
Name	Class Year	Former Position	Notability	Refs
John W. Heston	1881	Writer	American academic who served as the second president of Washington State University, third president of South Dakota State University, and fourth president of Dakota State University	
Paul Levine	1969	Editor-in-chief	American author of crime fiction, including legal thrillers	
Vance Packard	1936	Writer	American journalist, social critic, and author, including The Hidden Persuaders and The Naked Society	
Tom Verducci	1982	Writer	American sportswriter who writes for Sports Illustrated, its online magazine SI.com, and is a reporter and commentator for Fox Major League Baseball and MLB Network	

== Editors-in-Chief ==
A list of all past and present Editor-in-Chiefs of The Daily Collegian

† Resigned

== The Daily Collegian ==
- 2025— 2026: Mercedes Hamilton
- 2024- 2025: Amy Schafer
- 2023-2024: Nick Stonesifer
- 2022-2023: Megan Swift
- 2021-2022: Jade Campos
- 2020-2021: Maddie Aiken
- 2019-2020: Elena Rose
- 2018-2019: Kelly Powers
- 2017-2018: Sam Ruland
- 2016-2017: Garrett Ross
- 2015-2016: Shannon Sweeney
- 2014-2015: Sam Janesch
- 2013-2014: Brittany Horn
- 2012-2013: Casey McDermott
- 2011-2012: Lexi Belculfine
- 2010-2011: Liz Murphy
- 2009-2010: Rossilynne Skena
- 2008-2009: Terry Casey
- 2007-2008: Devon Lash
- 2006-2007: Erin James
- 2005-2006: Jennette C. Hannah
- 2004-2005: Jimmy Young
- 2003-2004: Lynne Funk
- 2002-2003: Alison Kepner
- 2001-2002: Jill Leonard
- 2000-2001: Patricia Tisak
- 1999-2000: Stacey Confer
- 1998-1999: Bridgette Blair
- 1998: Megan Donley
- 1997-1998: Julie Randall†
- 1997: Rachel Hogan†
- 1996-1997: Jason Alt
- 1995-1996: Courtney Cairns
- 1994-1995: Angela Pomponio
- 1993-1994: Mike Abrams
- 1992-1993: Bridget Mount
- 1991-1992: Isabel Molina
- 1990-1991: Ted Sickler
- 1989-1990: Diane A. Davis
- 1988-1989: Carolyn Sorisio
- 1987-1988: Christopher Raymond
- 1986: Anita Huslin
- 1985: Gail Johnson
- 1984: Alecia Swasy
- 1983: Suzanne M. Cassidy
- 1982-1983: Phil Gutis
- 1981-1982: Paula Froke
- 1980-1981: Betsy Long
- 1979-1980: Peter Barnes
- 1978-1979: David Skidmore
- 1977-1978: Jeffrey Hawkes
- 1976-1977: Sheila McCauley
- 1975-1976: Jerry Schwartz
- 1974-1975: Diane M. Nottle
- 1973-1974: Patricia J. Stewart
- 1972-1973: Paul J. Schafer
- 1970-1972: Robert J. McHugh
- 1969-1970: James R. Dorris
- 1968-1969: Paul Levine
- 1967-1968: Richard Wiesenhutter
- 1966-1967: William F. Lee
- 1965-1966: John Lott
- 1964-1965: John R. Thompson
- 1963-1964: C. David Bolbach
- 1962-1963: Ann Palmer
- 1960-1962: John W. Black
- 1959-1960: Dennis Malick
- 1958-1959: Robert Franklin
- 1957-1958: Edward Dubbs
- 1956-1957: Michael Moyle
- 1955-1956: Myron Feinsilber
- 1955: Norman C. Miller Jr
- 1954-1955: Diehl McKalip
- 1953-1954: David Jones
- 1952-1953: David Pellnitz
- 1951-1952: Marvin Krasnansky
- 1950-1951: Dean Gladfelter
- 1949-1950: Thomas E. Morgan
- 1948-1949: Lewis Stone
- 1947-1948: Allan Ostar
- 1946-1947: Michael A. Blatz
- 1945-1946: Woodene Bell
- 1945: Helen Hatton
- 1945: Victor Danilov
- 1945: Emil A. Kubek
- 1944: Lee H. Learner
- 1943-1944: Alice R. Fox
- 1943: Jane H. Murphy
- 1943: Paul I. Woodland
- 1942-1943: Gordon Coy
- 1941-1942: Ross B. Lehman
- 1940-1941: Adam A. Smyser

== Penn State Collegian ==
- 1939-1940: William Engel Jr.
- 1938-1939: John A. Troanovitch
- 1937-1938: Charles M. Wheeler Jr.
- 1936-1937: Johnson Brenneman
- 1935-1936: Harry B. Henderson Jr.
- 1934-1935: John A. Brutzman
- 1933-1934: Charles A. Myers
- 1932-1933: Robert E. Tschan
- 1931-1932: Hugh R. Riley Jr.
- 1930-1931: William K. Ulerich
- 1929-1930: James H. Coogan Jr.
- 1927-1929: Louis H. Bell Jr.
- 1926-1927: Wheeler Lord Jr.
- 1926-1927: W. P. Reed
- 1925-1926: H. W. Cohen
- 1924-1925: W. L. Pratt
- 1923-1924: E. E. Helm
- 1922-1923: E. D. Schive
- 1921-1922: A. G. Pratt
- 1920-1921: Frederick H. Leuschner
- 1919-1920: G. S. Wykoff
- 1919: G. W. Sullivan
- 1917-1918: D. M. Cresswell
- 1916-1917: Edmund J. Kenney
- 1915: D. McKay Jr.
- 1914-1915: J. R. Mathers
- 1913-1914: J. D. Hogarth
- 1912-1913: R. M. Evans
- 1911-1912: W. S. Kriebel Jr.

== State Collegian ==
- 1911: W. S. Kriebel Jr.
- 1910-1911: C. MacC. Breitinger
- 1909-1910: A. W. Fisher
- 1907-1909: C. N. Fleming
- 1906-1907: K. Little
- 1905-1906: T. F. Foltzt
- 1904-1905: Alex Hart
- 1904: W. B. Hoke

== The Free Lance ==
- 1903-1904: E. K. McDowell
- 1902-1903: F. H. Taylor
- 1901-1902: J. E. Wagner
- 1900-1901: H. H. Hanson
- 1899-1900: F. T. Cole
- 1899: William L. Affelder
- 1898: George J. Yundt
- 1897-1898: R. T. Strohm
- 1896-1897: H. H. Allen
- 1895-1896: H. A. Kuhn
- 1894-1895: D. L. Patterson
- 1893-1894: W. A. Silliman
- 1892-1893: Geo R. Weiland
- 1892: R. B. Mattern
- 1891-1902: Nelson McA. Loyd
- 1890-1891: Walter M. Camp
- 1889-1890: George R. Meek
- 1888-1889: Curtin G. Roop
- 1888: Geo M. Downing
- 1887: Griffith J. Thomas
- 1887: William P. Fisher Jr.

== Awards ==
Awards won by The Daily Collegian and its reporters

National Pacemaker Awards
Year	Category	Result
2019	Online Pacemaker	Finalist
2017	Online Pacemaker	Winner
2016	Online Pacemaker	Finalist
2014	Online Pacemaker	Finalist
2013	Online Pacemaker	Winner
2013	Newspaper Pacemaker	Winner
2012	Newspaper Pacemaker	Winner
2012	Newspaper Pacemaker	Finalist
2010	Online Pacemaker	Finalist
2010	Newspaper Pacemaker	Finalist
2008	Online Pacemaker	Winner
2006	Newspaper Pacemaker	Finalist
2001	Newspaper Pacemaker	Finalist
2000	Newspaper Pacemaker	Finalist
1999	Newspaper Pacemaker	Finalist
1985	Newspaper Pacemaker	Winner

Associated Collegiate Press Survey
Year	Rating
1968	First Class
1967	First Class
1945	Superior

CMA College Newspaper of the Year
Year	Result
2011-2012	Winner

Princeton Review Best College Newspaper Ranking
Year	Ranking
2019	12th
2017	4th
2015	3rd
2014	3rd
2013	6th
2012	1st
2011	6th
2010	6th

Sigma Delta Chi Awards
Year	Category	Result
1982	Best Campus Paper	1st
1968	News writing	1st
1968	Sports Writing	2nd
1968	Editorial Writing	3rd
1966	Sports Writing	1st
1966	News Writing	2nd
1959	Sports Writing	1st

College Newspaper Business Advertising Managers Awards
Year	Category	Recipient	Place
1987	Advertising Sales Manager of the Year	Dave Profozich	Winner
1987	Classified Section	Staff	First
1987	Office Administration Materials	Staff	First
1980	Trendsetter Award	Staff	Winner

College Newspaper Business Advertising Managers Awards
Year	Place
1919	1st
1920	3rd
