= Vance Packard =

American journalist and social critic (1914–1996)

Vance Oakley Packard
- Born: May 22, 1914; Granville Summit, Pennsylvania, U.S.
- Died: December 12, 1996 (aged 82); Martha's Vineyard, Massachusetts, U.S.
- Education: Pennsylvania State University; Columbia University Graduate School of Journalism
- Occupations: Journalist, social critic, and author
- Spouse: Virginia Matthews
- Children: 2 sons, 1 daughter
- Parent(s): Philip J. Packard; Mabel Case Packard

Vance Oakley Packard (May 22, 1914 – December 12, 1996) was an American journalist and social critic. He was the author of several books, including The Hidden Persuaders and The Naked Society. He was a critic of consumerism.

== Early life ==
Vance Packard was born in Granville Summit, Pennsylvania, to Philip J. Packard and Mabel Case Packard. Between 1920 and 1932, he attended local public schools in State College, Pennsylvania, where his father managed a dairy farm owned by the Pennsylvania State College (later Penn State University). He identified himself as a "farm boy" throughout his life, although he moved to State College and in later life lived in affluent areas. In 1932, he entered Pennsylvania State University, where he earned a B.A. degree, majoring in English. He graduated in 1936, and worked briefly for the local newspaper, the Centre Daily Times. He earned his master's degree at the Columbia University Graduate School of Journalism in 1937.

== Career ==
Packard joined the Boston Daily Record as a staff reporter in 1937. He became a reporter for the Associated Press around 1940, and in 1942, joined the staff of The American Magazine as a section editor, later becoming a staff writer. That periodical closed in July, 1956, and Packard became a writer at Collier's. After its closing by the end of the year, he devoted his full attention to developing book-length projects of his own. Halfway into the next year, his The Hidden Persuaders was published to national attention, launching him into a career as a full-time social critic, lecturing and developing further books. He was a critic of consumerism, which he viewed as an attack on the traditional American way of life.

In July 2020, an academic description reported on the nature and rise of the "robot prosumer", derived from modern-day technology and related participatory culture, that, in turn, had been predicted substantially by science fiction writers, as well as Packard.

=== The Hidden Persuaders ===
Vance Packard's book The Hidden Persuaders, about media manipulation in the 1950s, sold more than a million copies.

In The Hidden Persuaders, first published in 1957, Packard explored advertisers' use of consumer motivational research and other psychological techniques, including depth psychology and subliminal tactics, to manipulate expectations and induce desire for products, particularly in the American postwar era. He identified eight "compelling needs" that advertisers promise products will fulfill (Emotional Security, Reassurance of worth, Ego gratification, Creative outlets, Love objects, Sense of power, Roots, Immortality).

According to Packard, these needs are so strong that people are compelled to buy products merely to satisfy those needs. The book also explores the manipulative techniques of promoting politicians to the electorate. Additionally, the book questions the morality of using these techniques.

While the book was a top-seller among middle-class audiences, it was widely criticised by marketing researchers and advertising executives as carrying a sensationalist tone and containing unsubstantiated assertions. In 2009 The Sunday Times included the book in its list of 12 most influential books since World War II.

=== The Naked Society ===
In his 1964 book called The Naked Society, Packard criticized advertisers' unfettered use of private information to create marketing schemes. He compared a recent Great Society initiative by then-president Lyndon B. Johnson, the National Data Bank, to the use of information by advertisers and argued for increased data privacy measures to ensure that information did not find its way into the wrong hands. The essay led Congress to create the Special Subcommittee on the Invasion of Privacy and inspired privacy advocates such as Neil Gallagher and Sam Ervin to fight Johnson's flagrant disregard for consumer privacy.

== Personal life and death ==
Packard was married to Virginia Matthews; they had two sons and a daughter. They resided in New Canaan, Connecticut and Martha's Vineyard. He died in 1996 at the Martha's Vineyard Hospital.

== Bibliography ==
- 1946 How to Pick a Mate – a guide co-authored with the head of the Penn State marriage counseling service
- 1950 Animal IQ: The Human Side of Animals – a popular paperback on animal intelligence
- 1957 The Hidden Persuaders – on the advertising industry – the first of a popular series of books on sociology topics (ISBN 0-671-53149-2)
- 1959 The Status Seekers – describing American social stratification and behavior
- 1960 The Waste Makers – criticizes planned obsolescence describing the impact of American productivity, especially on the national character
- 1960 Oh, Happy, Happy, Happy – foreword by Vance Packard, with Charles Saxon
- 1962 The Pyramid Climbers – describes the changing impact of American enterprise on managers, the structured lives of corporate executives and the conformity they need to advance in the hierarchy
- 1964 The Naked Society – on the threats to privacy posed by new technologies such as computerized filing, modern surveillance techniques and methods for influencing human behavior
- 1968 The Sexual Wilderness – on the sexual revolution of the 1960s and changes in male-female relationships
- 1972 A Nation of Strangers – about the attrition of communal structure through frequent geographical transfers of corporate executives
- 1977 The People Shapers – on the use of psychological & biological testing and experimentation to manipulate human behavior
- 1983 Our Endangered Children – discusses growing up in a changing world, warning that American preoccupation with money, power, status, and sex ignored the needs of future generations
- 1989 The Ultra Rich: How Much Is Too Much? – examines the lives of thirty American multimillionaires and their extravagances

== See also ==
- Brainwashing
- History of advertising
- History of marketing
- Marketing research
