= Special Subcommittee on the Invasion of Privacy =

US House of Representatives body

In a 1964 book called The Naked Society, Vance Packard criticized advertisers' unfettered use of private information to create marketing schemes. He compared a recent Great Society initiative by then-president Lyndon B. Johnson, the National Data Bank, to the use of information by advertisers and argued for increased data privacy measures to ensure that information did not find its way into the wrong hands. The essay led Congress to create the Special Subcommittee on the Invasion of Privacy and inspired privacy advocates such Neil Gallagher and Sam Ervin. These individuals fought Johnson's disregard for consumer privacy.
