= New Jersey's 13th congressional district =

Former U.S. House district in New Jersey

Coordinates: 40°43′41″N 74°04′40″W

- Obsolete district
- Created: 1930
- Eliminated: 2010
- Years active: 1933-2013

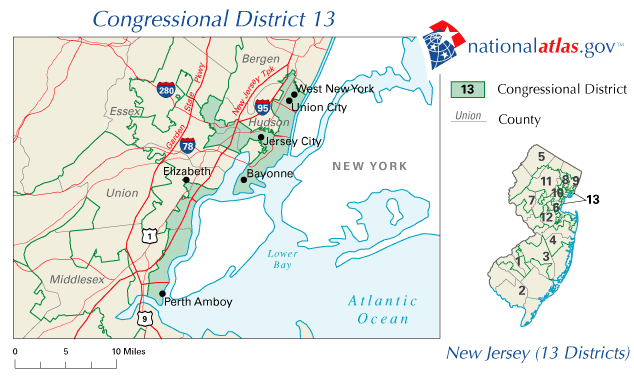
The district from 2003 to 2013

New Jersey's 13th congressional district was a congressional district which was created for the 73rd United States Congress in 1933, based on redistricting following the 1930 United States census. It was last represented by Democrat Albio Sires when it was eliminated due to redistricting following the 2010 United States census. Most of this district became part of a newly redrawn 8th district in 2013.

== Geography ==
From 2003 to 2013, (based on redistricting following the 2000 census), the district contains portions of 4 counties and 17 municipalities:

Essex County:

Newark (part; also 10)

Hudson County:

Bayonne (part), East Newark, Guttenberg, Harrison, Hoboken, Jersey City (part; also 9 and 10), Kearny (part; also 9), North Bergen (part; also 9), Union City, Weehawken, West New York

Middlesex County:

Carteret, Perth Amboy, Woodbridge Township (part; also 7)

Union County:

Elizabeth (part; also 10), Linden (part; also 7 and 10)

== Demography ==
Before district elimination based on the last redistricting in 2013, of the district's 647,258 residents, 308,247 identified themselves as being Hispanic, accounting for 47.6% of the district's population.

== Elections results ==
=== 2006 elections ===
This district was considered solidly Democratic, with the winner of the Democratic Party primary the near-certain winner in November's general election, both in the special and regular elections.

Sires won the seat in a special election on November 7, 2006, after Bob Menendez resigned from this seat on January 16, 2006 in advance of his assumption of the Senate seat vacated by Jon Corzine, who in turn left his Senate seat to become Governor of New Jersey. Sires also won the general election, and will represent the district through at least 2008. In the special primary to fill the remaining two months of the current term, Sires won approximately 90% of the vote, defeating James Geron, assuring Sires of the seat as no Republican opposed him in the special election. Sires was sworn into Congress on November 13, 2006.

The two most prominent names running for the seat in the regular election were the former Speaker of the New Jersey General Assembly, Albio Sires of West New York, and Assemblyman Joseph Vas, who is also Mayor of Perth Amboy, both of whom ran in the Democratic primary. While the two faced off to fill the full two-year term, Vas decided not to run in the special election to fill the two months remaining in Menendez's term. In the primary for the full two-year term, held on June 6, 2006, Albio Sires beat Joseph Vas, capturing almost 75% of the vote. In the general election, Sires beat Republican John Guarini, who had run unopposed for the GOP nod.

== Election results from statewide races ==
Year	Office	Results
2000	President	Gore 72 - 25%
2004	President	Kerry 69 - 31%
2008	President	Obama 75 - 24%

== List of members representing the district ==
Member	Party	Years	Cong ress	Electoral history
District established March 4, 1933
Mary Teresa Norton (Jersey City)	Democratic	March 4, 1933 – January 3, 1951	73rd 74th 75th 76th 77th 78th 79th 80th 81st	Redistricted from the 12th district and re-elected in 1932. Re-elected in 1934. Re-elected in 1936. Re-elected in 1938. Re-elected in 1940. Re-elected in 1942. Re-elected in 1944. Re-elected in 1946. Re-elected in 1948. Retired.
Alfred D. Sieminski (Jersey City)	Democratic	January 3, 1951 – January 3, 1959	82nd 83rd 84th 85th	Elected in 1950. Re-elected in 1952. Re-elected in 1954. Re-elected in 1956. Lost renomination.
Cornelius E. Gallagher (Bayonne)	Democratic	January 3, 1959 – January 3, 1973	86th 87th 88th 89th 90th 91st 92nd	Elected in 1958. Re-elected in 1960. Re-elected in 1962. Re-elected in 1964. Re-elected in 1966. Re-elected in 1968. Re-elected in 1970. Lost renomination.
Joseph J. Maraziti (Boonton)	Republican	January 3, 1973 – January 3, 1975	93rd	Elected in 1972. Lost re-election.
Helen Stevenson Meyner (Phillipsburg)	Democratic	January 3, 1975 – January 3, 1979	94th 95th	Elected in 1974. Re-elected in 1976. Lost re-election.
James A. Courter (Hackettstown)	Republican	January 3, 1979 – January 3, 1983	96th 97th	Elected in 1978. Re-elected in 1980. Redistricted to the 12th district.
Edwin B. Forsythe (Moorestown)	Republican	January 3, 1983 – March 29, 1984	98th	Redistricted from the 6th district and re-elected in 1982. Died.
Vacant		March 29, 1984 – November 6, 1984	98th	
Jim Saxton (Vincentown)	Republican	November 6, 1984 – January 3, 1993	98th 99th 100th 101st 102nd	Elected to finish Forsythe's term. Elected to full term in 1984. Re-elected in 1986. Re-elected in 1988. Re-elected in 1990. Redistricted to the 3rd district.
Bob Menendez (Hoboken)	Democratic	January 3, 1993 – January 16, 2006	103rd 104th 105th 106th 107th 108th 109th	Elected in 1992. Re-elected in 1994. Re-elected in 1996. Re-elected in 1998. Re-elected in 2000. Re-elected in 2002. Re-elected in 2004. Resigned when appointed U.S. senator.
Vacant		January 16, 2006 – November 13, 2006	109th	
Albio Sires (West New York)	Democratic	November 13, 2006 – January 3, 2013	109th 110th 111th 112th	Elected to finish Menendez's term. Elected to full term in 2006. Re-elected in 2008. Re-elected in 2010. Redistricted to the 8th district.
District dissolved January 3, 2013
