= Alfred Dennis Sieminski =

American politician (1911–1990)

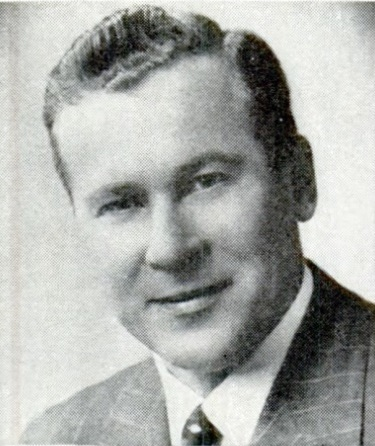
- From 1957's Pocket Congressional Directory of the Eighty-Fifth Congress

Member of the U.S. House of Representatives from New Jersey's 13th district
- In office January 3, 1951 – January 3, 1959
- Preceded by: Mary Teresa Norton
- Succeeded by: Cornelius Gallagher

Personal details
- Born: August 23, 1911 Jersey City, New Jersey, U.S.
- Died: December 13, 1990 (aged 79) Vienna, Virginia, U.S.
- Party: Democratic

Alfred Dennis Sieminski (August 23, 1911 – December 13, 1990) was an American Democratic Party politician who represented New Jersey's 13th congressional district, centered on Hudson County, in the United States House of Representatives for four terms from 1951 to 1959.

As of 2022, Sieminski was the last incumbent Representative to lose a primary election in New Jersey, other than those who lost to another incumbent due to redistricting.

== Early life and career ==
Sieminski was born in Jersey City, New Jersey on August 23, 1911. He attended public schools, New York Military Academy in Cornwall-on-Hudson, New York and the Hun School of Princeton, in Princeton, New Jersey. He graduated from Princeton University in 1934 and was a student at Harvard Law School in 1935 and 1936. He was of Polish origin and spoke his ancestors' language.

He worked as comptroller and vice president of Brunswick Laundry in Jersey City starting in 1937. He entered the United States Army as a private in 1942, served in the Italian Campaign with the 92nd Infantry Division in 1944 and 1945, was a captain, Military Government Division in Austria, in 1945 and 1946, served with Tenth Corps in Korea in 1950, was discharged to the Infantry Reserve as a major in 1950 and promoted to lieutenant colonel in 1956.

== Congress ==
Sieminski was elected as a Democrat to the Eighty-second and to the three succeeding Congresses, serving in office from January 3, 1951, to January 3, 1959, and was an unsuccessful candidate for renomination in 1958. To date, he is the last incumbent New Jersey congressman to lose in a non-redistricting primary election.

== After Congress ==
He was administrative vice president of the Hun School, engaged in administrative education and project development, and worked at the Medical and General Reference Library of the Veterans Administration in Washington, D.C. from 1962 to 1973.

Sieminski was a resident of Vienna, Virginia, until his death on December 13, 1990, at the age of 79 due to a heart attack.

U.S. House of Representatives
Preceded by Mary Teresa Norton	Member of the U.S. House of Representatives from New Jersey's 13th congressional district January 3, 1951-January 3, 1959	Succeeded by Cornelius Gallagher
