= The Naked Society =

1964 non-fiction book about privacy by Vance Packard

- First edition
- Author: Vance Packard
- Subject: Privacy
- Publisher: David McKay Publications
- Publication date: 1964
- Publication place: United States
- Pages: 369

The Naked Society is a 1964 book on privacy by Vance Packard. The book argues that changes in technology are encroaching on privacy and could eventually create a society with radically different privacy standards.

Packard criticized advertisers' unfettered use of private information to create marketing schemes. He compared a recent Great Society initiative by then-president Lyndon B. Johnson, the National Data Bank, to the use of information by advertisers and argued for increased data privacy measures to ensure that information did not find its way into the wrong hands. The essay led Congress to create the Special Subcommittee on the Invasion of Privacy and inspired privacy advocates such Neil Gallagher and Sam Ervin to fight Johnson's flagrant disregard for consumer privacy. Ervin criticized Johnson's invasive domestic agenda and saw the unfiltered database of consumers' information as a sign of presidential abuse of power. Ervin warned that “the computer never forgets”.

== Summary ==
It was the first book to raise the question of how technological change is making observation of individuals lives, tastes, opinions and actions easier to observe and monitor. It argues that privacy is worth defending.

The technologies of concern at the time of publication were such things as hidden microphones, concealed cameras, and the polygraph lie detector.

One reviewer summarized the book by saying that it "is concerned with all the peeping tomfoolery which is going on today and the various ways in which we are exposed and thereby victimized."
