= The Ultra Rich (book) =

1989 non-fiction book by Vance Packard

- First edition
- Author: Vance Packard
- Subject: American super-rich
- Publisher: Little, Brown and Company
- Publication date: 1989
- Publication place: United States
- Pages: 358
- ISBN: 9780316687522

The Ultra Rich: How Much Is Too Much? is a 1989 nonfiction book by Vance Packard. It details the lives of extravagance of thirty American super-rich (among them: J. R. Simplot, Bob Guccione, Ed Bass, Jane Hunt, and Samuel J. LeFrak). He argues against the vast accumulation of wealth, and advocates for a wealth tax and inheritance tax reform.
