= Joseph J. Maraziti =

American politician (1912–1991)

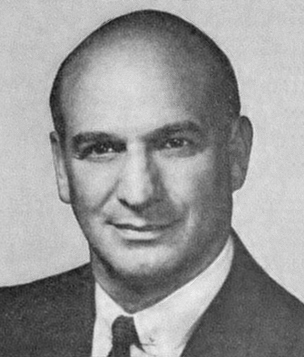

Member of the U.S. House of Representatives from New Jersey's 13th district
- In office January 3, 1973 – January 3, 1975
- Preceded by: New Constituency (Redistricting)
- Succeeded by: Helen Stevenson Meyner

Member of the New Jersey Senate from the 10th district (at-large)
- In office January 9, 1968 – January 3, 1973 Serving with Harry L. Sears
- Preceded by: Thomas J. Hillery; Milton Woolfenden, Jr.
- Succeeded by: Stephen B. Wiley

Member of the New Jersey General Assembly from Morris County
- In office 1958 – January 9, 1968
- Preceded by: Elden Mills
- Succeeded by: District abolished

Personal details
- Born: Joseph James Maraziti; June 15, 1912 Boonton, New Jersey, U.S.
- Died: May 20, 1991 (aged 78) Denville Township, New Jersey, U.S.
- Resting place: St. Mary's Cemetery; Boonton, New Jersey, U.S.
- Party: Republican
- Spouse: Eileen Hopkins
- Children: 7
- Education: Fordham University; New Jersey Law School (LLB)
- Occupation: Politician; lawyer; judge

Joseph James Maraziti (June 15, 1912 – May 20, 1991) was an American politician, lawyer and judge from New Jersey. He served one-term as a U.S. representative from 1973 to 1975. He served in the New Jersey General Assembly from 1958 to 1967 and in the New Jersey Senate from 1968 to 1972.

== Early life and career ==
Joseph James Maraziti was born on June 15, 1912, in Boonton, New Jersey. He attended the public schools and graduated from Boonton High School. He graduated from Fordham University and later graduated with a Bachelor of Laws from the New Jersey Law School in 1937.

In 1931, Maraziti served in the Citizens Military Training Corps as an infantry and judge advocate. He was admitted to the New Jersey bar in 1938 and commenced a legal practice in Boonton.

== Political career ==
Maraziti served as a legislative secretary for the New Jersey Senate from 1931 to 1934, and again from 1938 to 1940. He was legislative secretary to the New Jersey Assembly from 1936 to 1937. He then served as a municipal court judge in Boonton from 1940 to 1947. He served as an assistant prosecutor, Morris County from 1950 to 1953. From 1956 to 1957, he was legislative legal adviser to the board of freeholders in Morris County. He also worked as police recorder in Boonton and as a town attorney and an attorney for the board of health in Boonton. He was chairman of the Boonton Charter Commission Study Group.

Maraziti served as a member of the New Jersey General Assembly from 1958 to 1967, and in the New Jersey Senate from 1968 to 1972. In 1966, he served as a delegate to New Jersey State Republican Convention. He was an alternate delegate to the 1968 Republican National Convention. In 1972, he was majority whip of the senate.

== Congress ==
Maraziti was elected as a Republican to the ninety-third congress (January 3, 1973 – January 3, 1975). In 1974, Maraziti was one of the 38 United States House Committee on the Judiciary members who considered articles of impeachment against Richard Nixon during the Watergate scandal, consistently voting with the one-third Republican bloc against impeachment. In 1974, he was an unsuccessful candidate for reelection to the ninety-fourth congress. In 1977 and 1987, he ran unsuccessfully for the state assembly. In 1983, he was unsuccessful in running for Morris County's board of freeholders.

Maraziti resumed the practice of law. He practiced in multiple townships, including Mount Olive Township and Boonton. He was on the board of directors of All Souls Hospital in Morristown.

== Personal life ==
Maraziti married Eileen Hopkins. They had two sons and five daughters, Joseph Jr., Charles A., Mary Ellen, Margaret, Maria, Catherine and Eileen. He was a resident of Boonton and had a summer home in Manasquan. He lived at 414 Dixon Avenue in Boonton in the 1950s. He was a member of Our Lady of Mount Carmel Church in Boonton.

Following a stroke, Maraziti died on May 20, 1991, at St. Clares-Riverside Medical Center in Denville Township. He was buried at St. Mary's Cemetery in Boonton.

U.S. House of Representatives
Preceded by Cornelius E. Gallagher	Member of the U.S. House of Representatives from New Jersey's 13th congressional district 1973–1975	Succeeded by Helen S. Meyner
