= Helen Stevenson Meyner =

American politician (1928–1997)

Helen Meyner
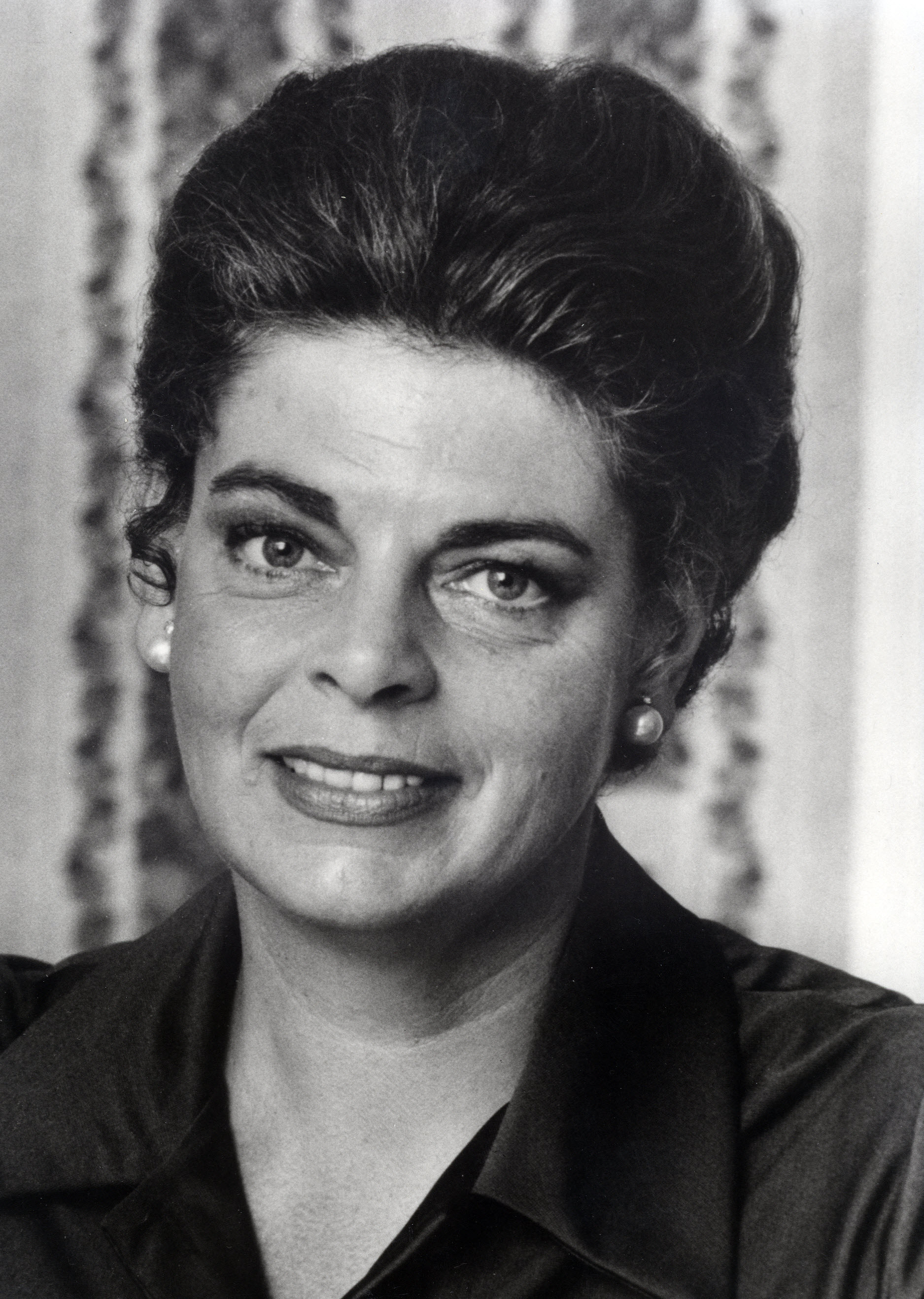

Member of the U.S. House of Representatives from New Jersey's 13th district
- In office January 3, 1975 – January 3, 1979
- Preceded by: Joseph Maraziti
- Succeeded by: Jim Courter

First Lady of New Jersey
- In role January 19, 1957 – January 16, 1962
- Governor: Robert B. Meyner
- Preceded by: Antoinette Ware Tatem Driscoll
- Succeeded by: Elizabeth Sullivan Murphy Hughes

Personal details
- Born: Helen Day Stevenson; March 5, 1929 Queens, New York, U.S.
- Died: November 2, 1997 (aged 68) Fort Myers, Florida, U.S.
- Party: Democratic
- Spouse: Robert B. Meyner (m. 1957; died 1990)
- Education: Colorado College (BA)

Helen Day Stevenson Meyner (March 5, 1929 — November 2, 1997) was an American politician from New Jersey. A Democrat, Meyner served as a U.S. representative from New Jersey from 1975 to 1979. As the wife of New Jersey Governor Robert B. Meyner, she was First Lady of New Jersey from 1957 to 1962. Meyner also served as a Red Cross nurse in Korea during the Korean War.

== Early life and early career ==
Helen Stevenson was born in New York City to William E. and Eleanor B. Stevenson. Her parents were prominent Democrats. William E. Stevenson was a founder of a law firm that later became Debevoise & Plimpton. He also served as president of Oberlin College and as Ambassador to the Philippines. They were members of the Stevenson family, which included Illinois governor and two-time Democratic nominee for president Adlai Stevenson II.

Helen Stevenson graduated from Rosemary Hall (now part of Choate Rosemary Hall) in 1946 and from Colorado College with a Bachelor of Arts degree in history in 1950.

== American Red Cross ==
Stevenson was a field worker for the Red Cross in Korea from 1950 to 1952. Her time as an American Red Cross (A.R.C.) nurse and Clubmobile worker is well documented in her own personal letters. In these letters she writes to her family about her time in Japan and Korea during the Korean War, giving a personal account of her duties and experiences working abroad in wartime. Meyner's letters from her time serving in the A.R.C. can be found in the Meyner Papers, located in Skillman Library at Lafayette College.

=== Letters ===
Meyner's serving papers take the form of either letters or postcards written to her family during her time in the Korean War. These documents describe her experiences as a hospital nurse in Japan from 1950 to 1951 and a clubmobile worker in Pusan, Korea from 1951 to 1952. Throughout her time at the A.R.C., Meyner continuously expressed her discontent with the administration and the mistreatment of the volunteers.

I went to Headquarters (Red Cross) I shouldn't have because it ruined my day. Boy they give me pain. I have never seen such a place. They treat you as if you – a mere insect of a hospital worker – were a dirt under their feet. Personnel there is especially bad it seems to me .... At headquarters they very obviously resent club workers (they are mostly hospital there of course) and they make it pretty obvious that they do too (December 17, 1950).

During her time in Japan, Meyner worked as a nurse in an American military hospital. As the hospital was severely understaffed and under-equipped, soldiers did not receive the health care that they needed, especially with regard to their mental well-being. Through her patients, Meyner learned of the chaos in Korea. She emphasized that the western media coverage of the war was not reflecting the actual situation.

There is little fighting going on in Korea right now. We don't know that from reading the papers or listening to the radio, we can tell by the number of wounded we are getting into the hospital .... They [the soldiers] are not proud of anything and they certainly are not fighting for anything, not even their outfits (January 5, 1951).

In April 1951, Meyner arrived in Pusan, Korea, as a clubmobile. She served coffee and doughnuts to soldiers who were returning to the base. She describes Korea as "dirty" and "extremely impoverished" in comparison to Japan.

There is such poverty here among the poor Koreans who are very different from the Japanese. And how different this is from Japan! Such dirt! We are always dirty but we make a mighty effort to stay neat and groomed, not only for G.I morale but for our own too (April 13, 1951).

Although her work was in recreational services, she was able to collect information about the war from soldiers. Meyner specifically reflected on her role as a white woman; often, soldiers enjoyed her company due to the lack of American women serving in Korea.

It was the first time we had visited them [Marines] and they were so cute and excited. They have absolutely nothing in the way of recreation out there and they could hardly believe their eyes when they saw a white woman. They took a million pictures of me and made such a fuss over me that you might have thought I was Lana Turner. I guess I seemed like Lana to them (April 30, 1951).

She indicates that the troops included soldiers from many nations. However, the hierarchy within the military prioritized white American soldiers over other nationalities.

I must say that the foreign troops are ever so much more polite ... than our own G.I's. American soldiers are treated better than any soldiers in the world (April 30, 1951).

In February 2019, Kara Dixon Vuic wrote the book The Girls Next Door: Bringing the Home Front to the Front Lines, which pulled from Helen Stevenson Meyner's letters as well as other women's writings in similar lines of wartime work to explore gender roles in the war environment. Vuic highlighted Meyner in the chapter "Dancing for Democracy".

=== Images ===
Images of Meyner from this time period are accessible in the online exhibit "Coffee, Doughnuts, and a Witty Line of Chatter".

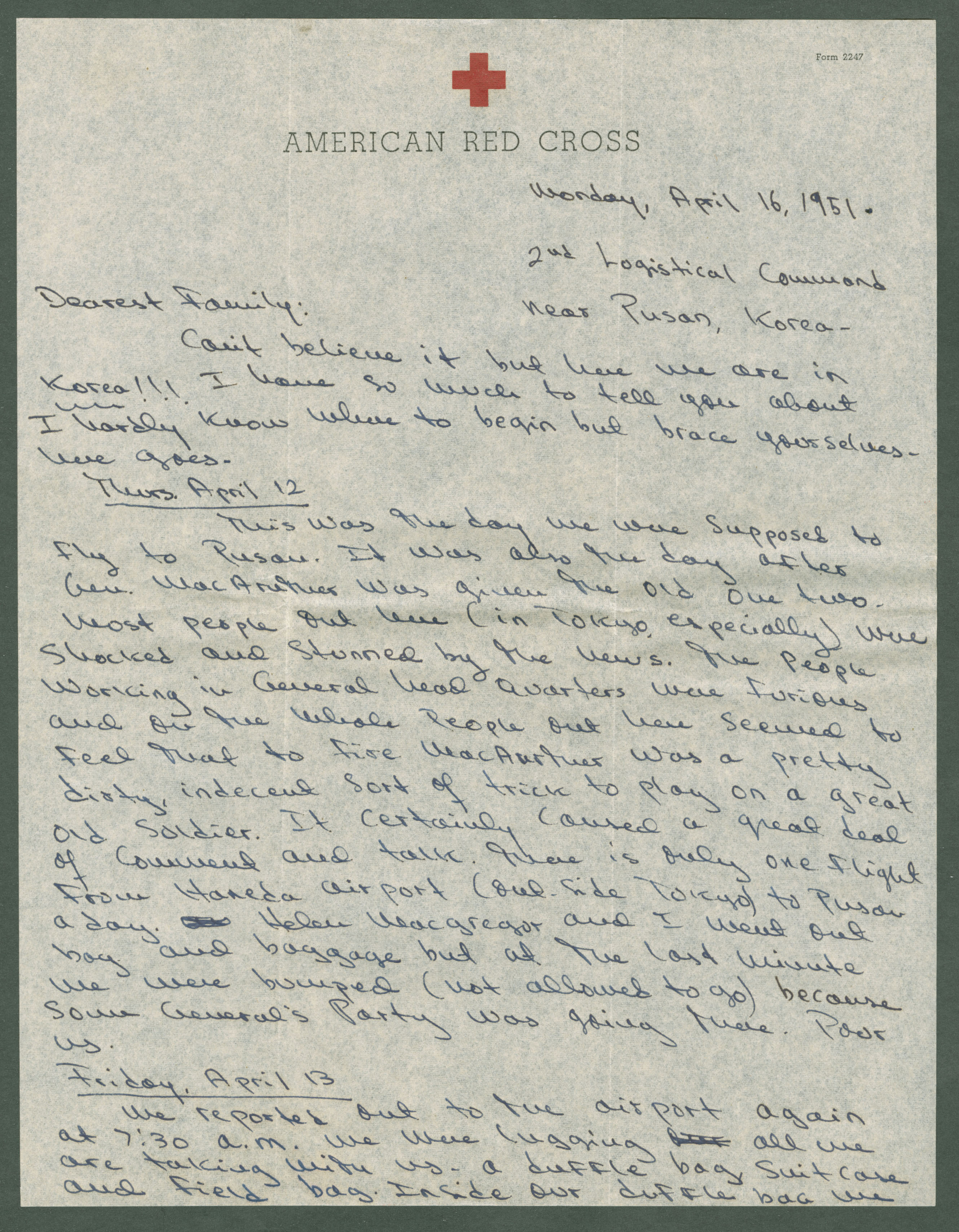
Letter from April 16, 1951, to family

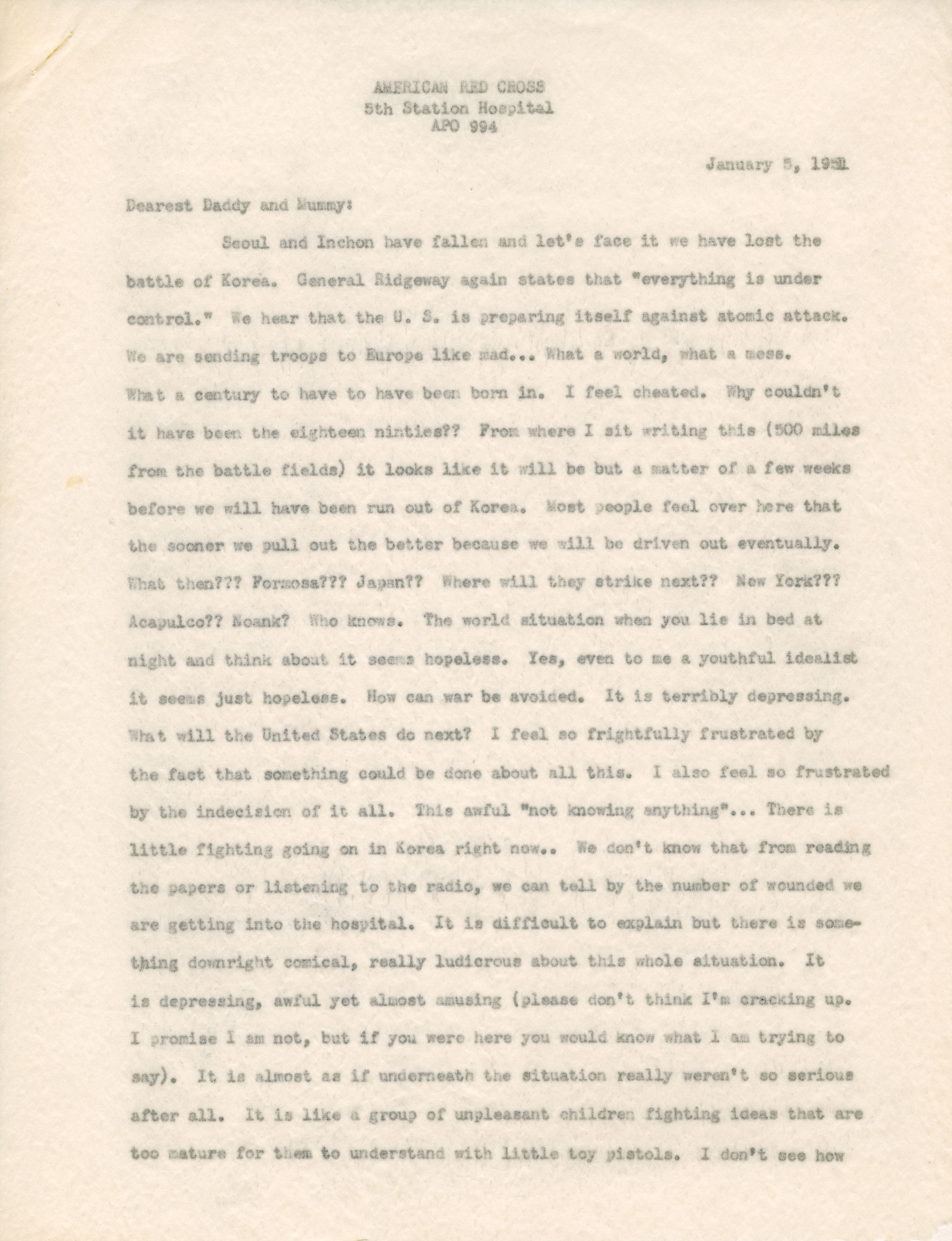
Letter from January 5, 1952, to family

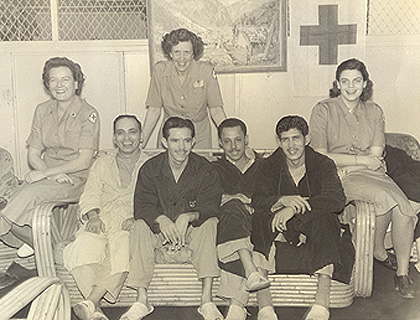
Nurses and patients at the Johnson Air Base, Japan 12 March 1951

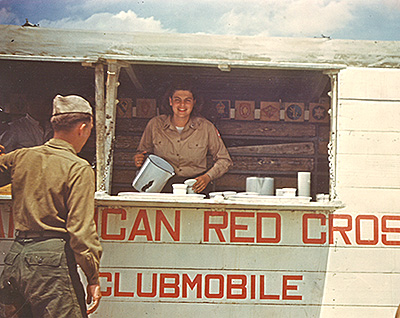
Helen Stevenson Meyner working in the A.R.C clubmobile, South Korea ca. 1951

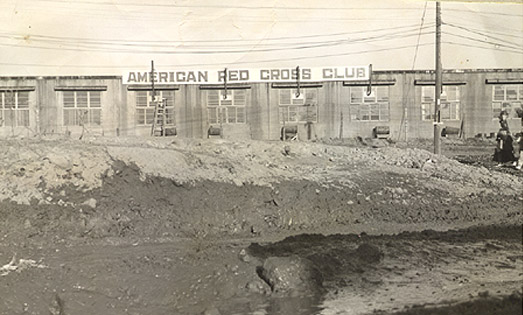
A.R.C Club in Pusan, Korea 1950-1951

== First Lady of New Jersey ==
Stevenson married Robert B. Meyner, then governor of New Jersey, on January 19, 1957 in Oberlin, Ohio. Helen Stevenson Meyner served as first lady of New Jersey. Robert Meyner left office as governor in 1962 due to term limits.

== U.S. House of Representatives ==
In 1972, Meyner ran as the Democratic nominee for Representative from New Jersey's newly redistricted 13th Congressional District that included her home in Phillipsburg and included Hunterdon, Sussex and Warren Counties and portions of Mercer and Morris Counties. She lost in the Republican-leaning district to the Republican candidate, Joseph J. Maraziti.

In 1974, with the Watergate scandal leading to Democratic congressional gains throughout the country, Meyner ran for the seat again, this time beating Maraziti. She won a second term in the 1976 elections in a close race against William E. Schluter, but lost her bid for a third term in 1978 to Republican James A. Courter. Meyner was known as a liberal Democrat.

In 1979, the Supersisters trading card set was produced and distributed; one of the cards featured Meyner's name and picture.

== Death ==
Meyner died on November 2, 1997, in Fort Myers, Florida.

== See also ==
- Women in the United States House of Representatives

== Sources ==
- United States Congress. "Helen Stevenson Meyner (id: M000685)". Biographical Directory of the United States Congress.
- Boyd, Ruby, Rachel Mead, and Sarah Ulstrup. "'We Cannot Change the World but We Can Change the People in It.' The Eleanor Bumstead Stevenson Papers." Digitizing American Feminisms. Accessed April 15, 2019. "We cannot change the world but we can change the people in it." The Eleanor Bumstead Stevenson Papers – Digitizing American Feminisms.
- Stevenson, Eleanor. I Knew Your Soldier: An Intimate Picture of Our Boys Overseas. Penguin Books, 1945.
- "The Robert B. and Helen Stevenson Meyner Papers, 1910-1998." Lafayette College Special Collections & College Archives. August 16, 2000. Accessed April 15, 2019. The Robert B. and Helen Stevenson Meyner Papers
- "WILLIAM E. AND ELEANOR B. STEVENSON PAPERS 15 INVENTORY." Oberlin College Archives. Accessed April 15, 2019. .

U.S. House of Representatives
Preceded by Joseph Maraziti	Member of the U.S. House of Representatives from New Jersey's 13th congressional district 1975–1979	Succeeded by Jim Courter
