= John E. Hunt =

American politician (1908–1989)

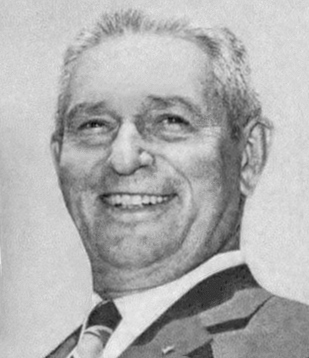

Member of the U.S. House of Representatives from New Jersey's 1st district
- In office January 3, 1967 – January 3, 1975
- Preceded by: William T. Cahill
- Succeeded by: James Florio

Member of the New Jersey Senate
- In office January 14, 1964 – January 3, 1967 Serving with Frank S. Farley (1966–1967)
- Preceded by: Thomas F. Connery, Jr.
- Succeeded by: Seat remained vacant
- Constituency: Gloucester County (1964–1966); 1st district (1966–1967)

Sheriff of Gloucester County
- In office 1959–1963

Personal details
- Born: November 25, 1908 Lambertville, New Jersey, U.S.
- Died: September 22, 1989 (aged 80) Woodbury, New Jersey, U.S.
- Party: Republican
- Spouse: Doris
- Children: 1

Military service
- Branch/service: United States Army
- Years of service: 1942–1946
- Rank: Major
- Unit: 456th Bomb Group
- Battles/wars: World War II

John Edmund Hunt (November 25, 1908 – September 22, 1989) was an American Republican Party politician who represented New Jersey's 1st congressional district in the United States House of Representatives from 1967 to 1975.

== Early life ==
Born in Lambertville, New Jersey on November 25, 1908, Hunt attended Newark Business School for three years. He then went on to the New Jersey State Police Academy, Federal Bureau of Investigation National Academy, Harvard School of Police Science, and United States Army Intelligence School. He became a New Jersey State Police trooper in 1930. From 1942 to 1946, he served in the United States Army as the Combat Intelligence Officer with the 456th Bomb Group. He earned a Bronze Star, Air Medal with two oak leaf clusters, Purple Heart, and a Presidential Unit Citation with oak leaf cluster. He left the Army in 1946 as a major.

== Political career ==
After his time in the military, Hunt resumed his career in the state police, eventually heading the force's narcotics squad in the South Jersey. He retired in 1959 and entered politics: he was elected sheriff of Gloucester County later that year. He continued in this role until 1963, when he was elected to the New Jersey Senate. From 1964 to 1966, he represented all of Gloucester County; from 1966 to January 1967, he represented the 1st Legislative District alongside Frank S. Farley. In the State Senate, he championed the creation of the Commodore Barry Bridge, which began construction in 1969. In 1966, Hunt was elected to represent New Jersey's 1st congressional district.

Hunt was described as a conservative Republican with a pronounced interest in law enforcement. He supported no-knock warrants and pre-trial detention, and once remarked during his time in Congress, "Our difficulty today is that we have not handcuffed the criminals. We have handcuffed the police". He was a member of Congress for eight years, and was defeated in 1974 by future Governor of New Jersey, James Florio. His staunch support for President Richard Nixon throughout the Watergate scandal was cited as a factor in his defeat. Hunt was acting director of the Defense Civil Preparedness Agency from 1976 to 1977.

Hunt was a longtime resident of Pitman, New Jersey, where he was vice president of a real estate firm from 1978 to 1981. He ran for mayor of the borough in 1983, but lost to Democrat Michael Hannum.

== Personal life and death ==
Hunt and his wife, Doris, had a daughter. He died at a hospital in Woodbury, New Jersey, on September 22, 1989, at the age of 80.

== Reference List ==
U.S. House of Representatives
Preceded by William T. Cahill	Member of the U.S. House of Representatives from New Jersey's 1st congressional district January 3, 1967 – January 3, 1975	Succeeded by James J. Florio
