= Centre Daily Times =

Daily newspaper in State College, Pennsylvania

- Type: Daily newspaper
- Format: Broadsheet
- Owner: The McClatchy Company
- Founder(s): Burns & Bowman Company
- Editor: Jessica McAllister
- Founded: May 12, 1898; 128 years ago (as State College Times)
- Language: English
- Headquarters: 330 Innovation Blvd., #212; State College, Pennsylvania 16803
- Country: United States
- Circulation: 9,279 Daily; 11,521 Sunday (as of 2020)
- ISSN: 0745-483X
- OCLC number: 61312383
- Website: www.centredaily.com

The Centre Daily Times is a daily newspaper located in State College, Pennsylvania. It is the hometown newspaper for State College and the Pennsylvania State University, with more than 45,000 students attending the main campus.

== History ==
The newspaper was founded on May 12, 1898, as the weekly State College Times. In 1901, the paper changed ownership and The Times Printing & Publishing Company was formed. Two years later, the company name was changed to Nittany Printing & Publishing.

The Aikens family, led by Dr. Charles T. Aikens, acquired the paper in 1914. Charles' son, Claude G. Aikens, became publisher five years later. Under his leadership, circulation continued to grow and the paper became a daily in 1934. At that time, the publication took on its current Centre Daily Times name. In 1966, Claude's son Charles T. Aikens II took over as publisher. In 1973, the newspaper's headquarters and production facilities were moved from downtown State College to a new location on East College Avenue.

The paper was sold to Knight Ridder in 1979. Under Knight Ridder, a Saturday morning edition was added in 1980 and a Sunday edition was launched in 1982. The Centre Daily Times became a morning paper in 1986.

The McClatchy Company purchased Knight Ridder in 2006, thereby acquiring the Centre Daily Times. In 2019, the Saturday print edition was eliminated. On February 13, 2020, The McClatchy Company and 54 affiliated companies filed for Chapter 11 bankruptcy protection in the United States District Court for the Southern District of New York. The company cited pension obligations and excessive debt as the primary reasons for the filing.

In 2021, the newspaper announced plans to sell its facility on East College Avenue and move to a new location. In 2023, the delivery day and content of Sunday print editions were shifted to Saturdays. Although the Sunday print edition was eliminated, the paper continued to offer new digital content (eEditions) seven days a week. In June 2023, the paper eliminated carrier delivery of the print edition and started sending newspapers to subscribers through the mail.

In April 2024, the newspaper announced it will decrease the number of print editions to two a week published on Wednesdays and Saturdays.

== Circulation area ==
Home delivery is available to all of Centre County and parts of Blair, Clearfield, Clinton, Huntingdon and Mifflin counties. In addition, single copy sales reach several more counties, especially during college football season.

== Major awards ==
- Pennsylvania NewsMedia Association 2026 Keystone Media Awards winner with 12 individual awards including five first-place finishes.
- Named to annual list of 10 newspapers to watch by Editor & Publisher.
