= Neil Gallagher (American politician) =

American politician (1921–2018)

Cornelius Gallagher
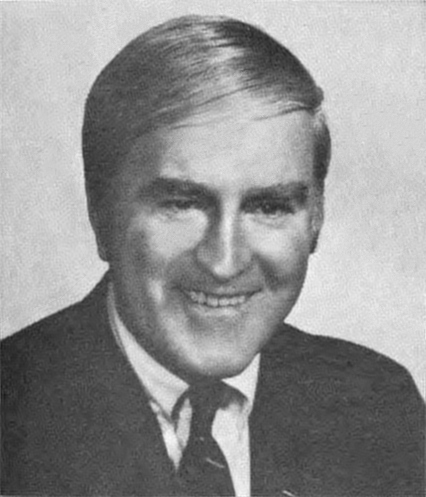

Member of the U.S. House of Representatives from New Jersey's 13th district
- In office January 3, 1959 – January 3, 1973
- Preceded by: Alfred Sieminski
- Succeeded by: Dominick V. Daniels (Redistricting)

Personal details
- Born: Cornelius Edward Gallagher; March 2, 1921 Bayonne, New Jersey, U.S.
- Died: October 17, 2018 (aged 97) Monroe Township, New Jersey, U.S.
- Resting place: Marksboro Presbyterian Church Cemetery, Blairstown, New Jersey
- Party: Democratic
- Spouse: Claire Jane Bell (m. 1943; died 2004)
- Children: 4
- Education: Seton Hall University (BA, LLB); New York University

Cornelius Edward "Neil" Gallagher (March 2, 1921 — October 17, 2018) was an American Democratic Party politician who represented New Jersey's 13th congressional district in the United States House of Representatives from 1959 until 1973.

== Early years ==
Gallagher was born in Bayonne, New Jersey. His father, a police officer, died when he was eight. He began working at a young age as a newsboy, and later a soda jerk. He attended St. Mary's School and Bayonne High School and graduated from John Marshall College in 1946; in 1945 and 1946 he was a member of the faculty of Rutgers University. He also graduated from John Marshall Law School with an LL.B. in 1948 (both now part of Seton Hall University, and engaged in additional studies at New York University in 1948 and 1949. Gallagher was admitted to the bar in 1949.

== Army ==
During World War II, Gallagher commanded an infantry rifle company in General George S. Patton's Third Army in Europe. He served from September 1941 and was discharged as a captain in November 1946. During the Korean War, he served one year.

== Career ==
Gallagher was appointed a director of the Broadway National Bank. He was elected to the Hudson County Board of Chosen Freeholders in 1953, a post he held until resigning in 1956, when he was appointed commissioner of the New Jersey Turnpike Authority. Gallagher was also a delegate to the Democratic National Conventions of 1952, 1956 and 1960.

=== Congress ===
He was elected as a Democrat to the Eighty-sixth through Ninety-second Congresses (January 3, 1959 – January 3, 1973). In Congress, he served on the House Foreign Affairs Committee and the Committee on Government Operations.

=== Later career ===
Gallagher subsequently became vice president of Baron/Canning International in New York City, and was a resident of the Columbia section of Knowlton Township, New Jersey.

== Conflict with J. Edgar Hoover ==
As a congressman, Gallagher chaired the Invasion of Privacy Subcommittee. Gallagher was a critic of the tactics of Federal Bureau of Investigation Director J. Edgar Hoover and Attorney General Robert F. Kennedy. Gallagher was approached by attorney Roy Cohn, who asked him on behalf of Hoover to hold hearings which would shift the blame for government surveillance from Hoover to Kennedy. Gallagher refused.

Media accounts then surfaced, including Life magazine, which contained alleged leaked material from FBI wiretaps suggesting that Gallagher was connected to the mafia, Gallagher accused Hoover of fabricating the stories to hound him from public life. Cohn met with Gallagher again, demanding on Hoover's behalf that he resign or face further allegations.

Gallagher was accused of evading payment of $74,000 in federal income taxes in 1966. He pled guilty in 1972 to tax evasion and perjury, sentenced to two years in prison and fined $10,000.

A book detailing Gallagher's side of the story was published in 2003.

== Death ==
Gallagher died of brain cancer on October 17, 2018, at the age of 97. His remains were interred in Marksboro Presbyterian Church Cemetery in Blairstown, New Jersey.

== See also ==
- List of American federal politicians convicted of crimes
- List of federal political scandals in the United States

U.S. House of Representatives
Preceded by Alfred Sieminski	Member of the U.S. House of Representatives from New Jersey's 13th congressional district 1959–1973	Succeeded by Joseph J. Maraziti
