= Conflagration =

Large and destructive fire

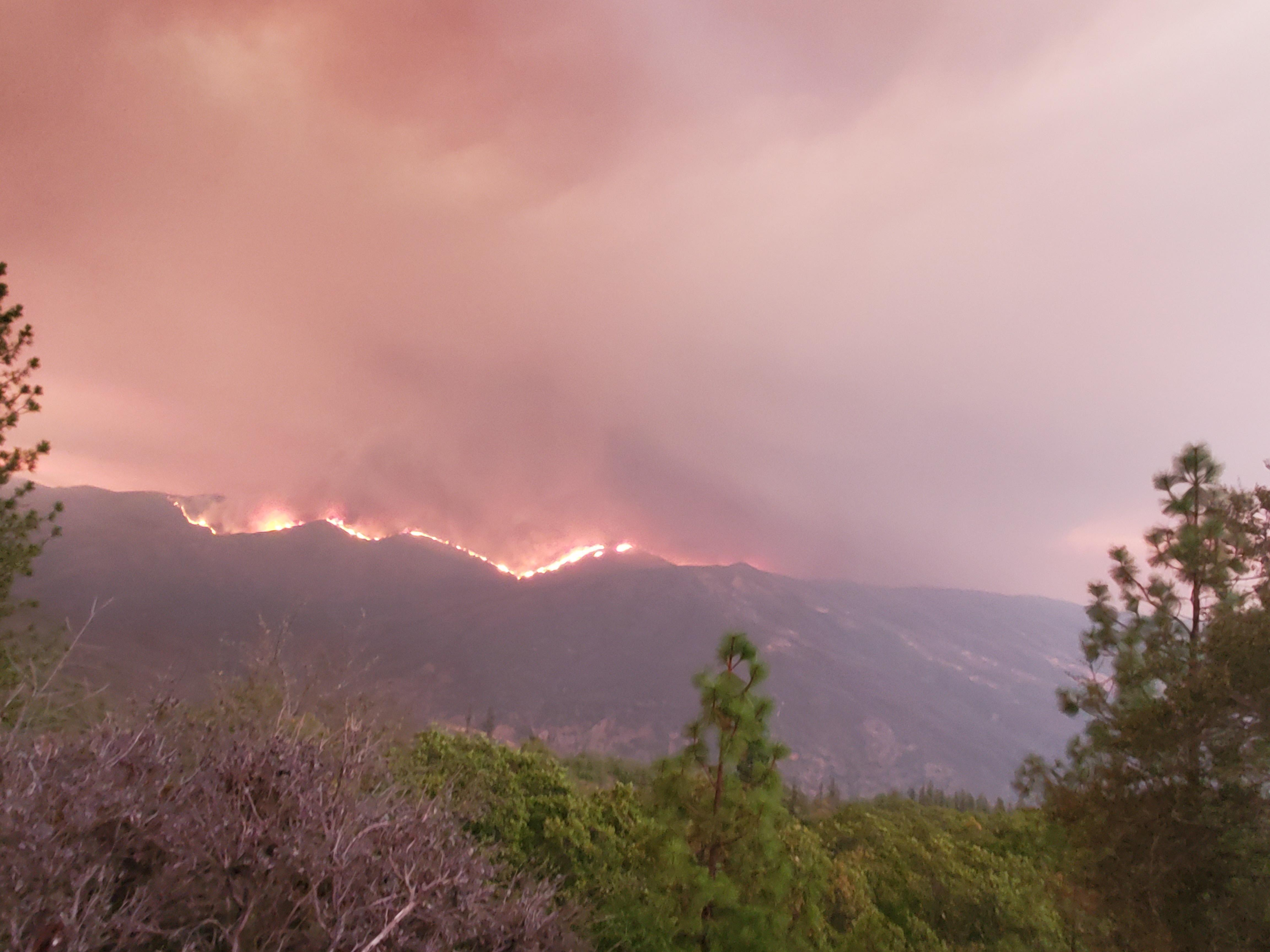
The August Complex fire in 2020, the largest fire in California's history

A conflagration is a particularly large and destructive fire. In the environment, this may describe a fire that spreads via structure to structure, ignition due to radiant or convective heat, or ember transmission. Conflagrations often damage human life, animal life, health, and/or property. A conflagration can begin accidentally or be intentionally created (arson). A very large fire can produce a firestorm, in which the central column of rising heated air induces strong inward winds, which supply oxygen to the fire. Conflagrations can cause casualties including deaths or injuries from burns, collapse of structures and attempts to escape, and smoke inhalation.

Firefighting is the practice of extinguishing a conflagration, protecting life and property and minimizing damage and injury. One of the goals of fire prevention is to avoid conflagrations. When a conflagration is extinguished, there is often a fire investigation to determine the cause of the fire.

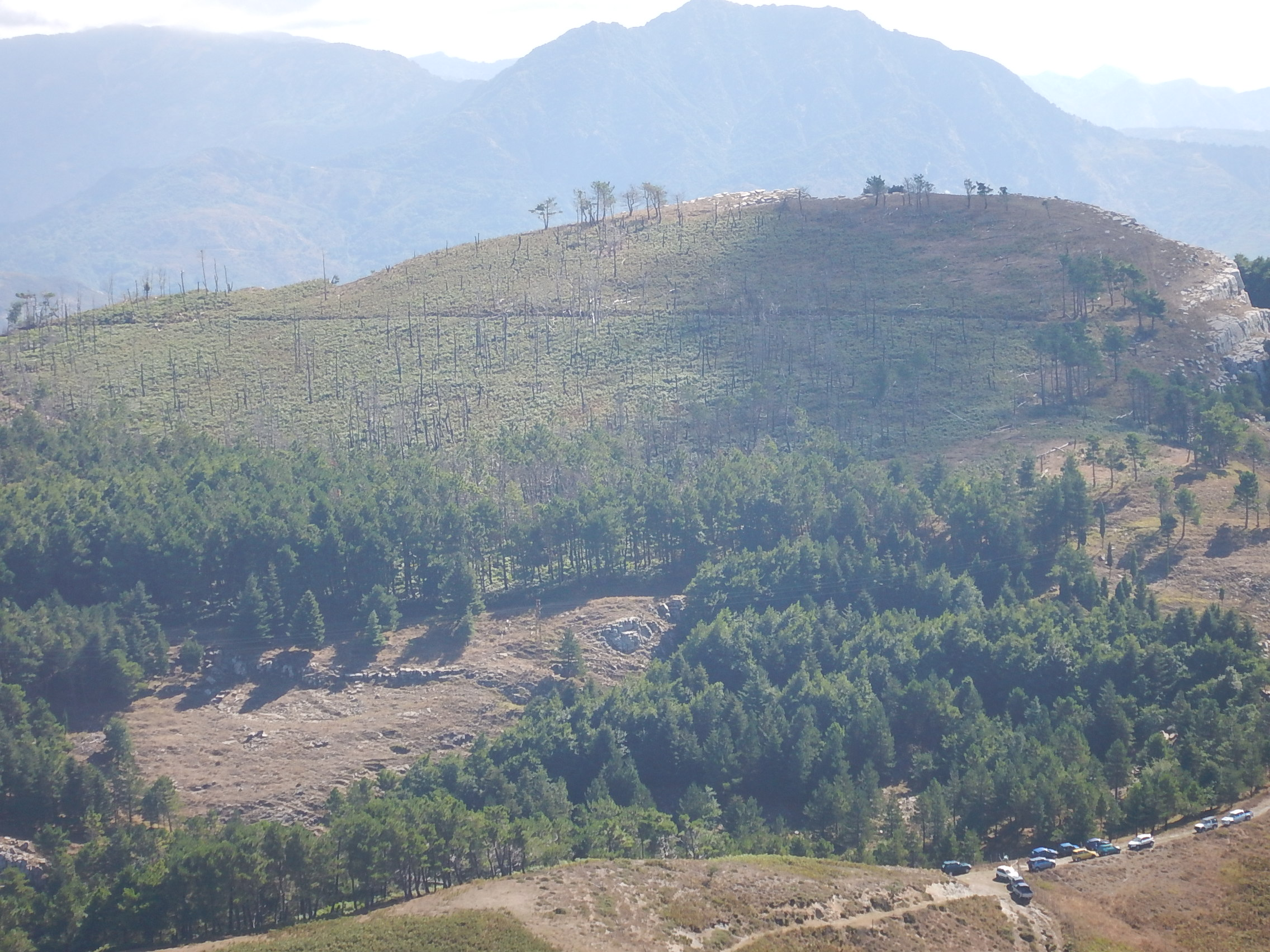
Burned trees in front the Montagna di Vernà, Peloritani mountains, Sicily

== Causes and types ==
During a conflagration a significant movement of air and combustion products occurs. Hot gaseous products of combustion move upward, causing the influx of more dense cold air to the combustion zone. Sometimes, the influx is so intense that the fire grows into a firestorm.

Inside a building, the intensity of gas exchange depends on the size and location of openings in walls and floors, the ceiling height, and the amount and characteristics of the combustible materials.

- Industrial conflagrations include fires at oil refineries, such as the 2009 Cataño oil refinery fire.
- Wildfires are fires in forests or other undeveloped areas, and may grow into a conflagration.
- An urban conflagration is defined as a "large, destructive fire that spreads beyond natural or artificial barriers; it can be expected to result in large monetary loss and may or may not include fatalities. An urban conflagration moves beyond a block and destroys whole sections of a city." Notable examples includes the Great Fire of London in 1666, the Great Fire of Tartu in 1775, the Great Fire of Turku in 1827, and the Great Fire of Hamburg in 1842, and the Camp Fire in Paradise, California in 2018, which burned 18,000 structures and killed 85 people.
- On board ships, a large uncontained fire may quickly lead to a ship conflagration.
- The conflagration of a building is known as a structure fire.

== Notable examples ==
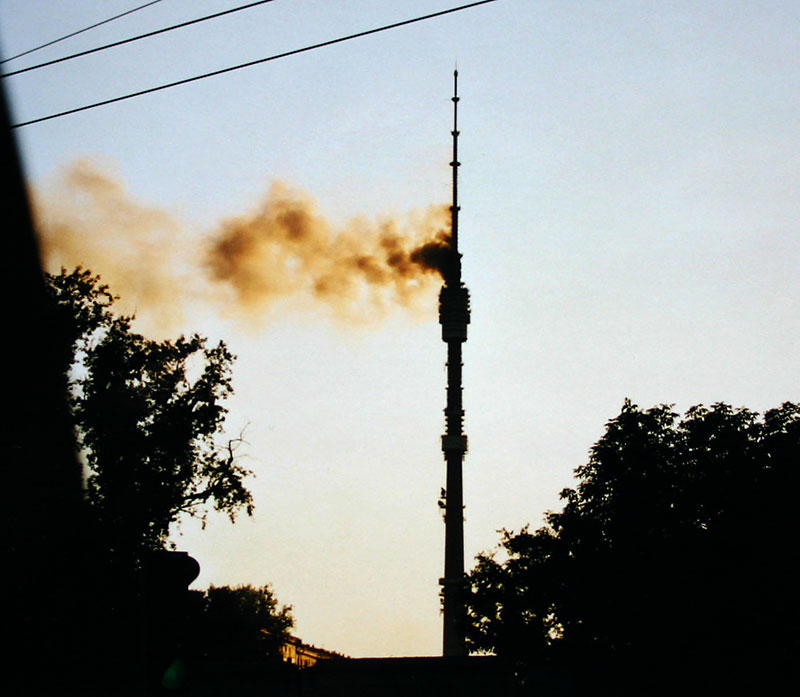
Ostankino Tower fire

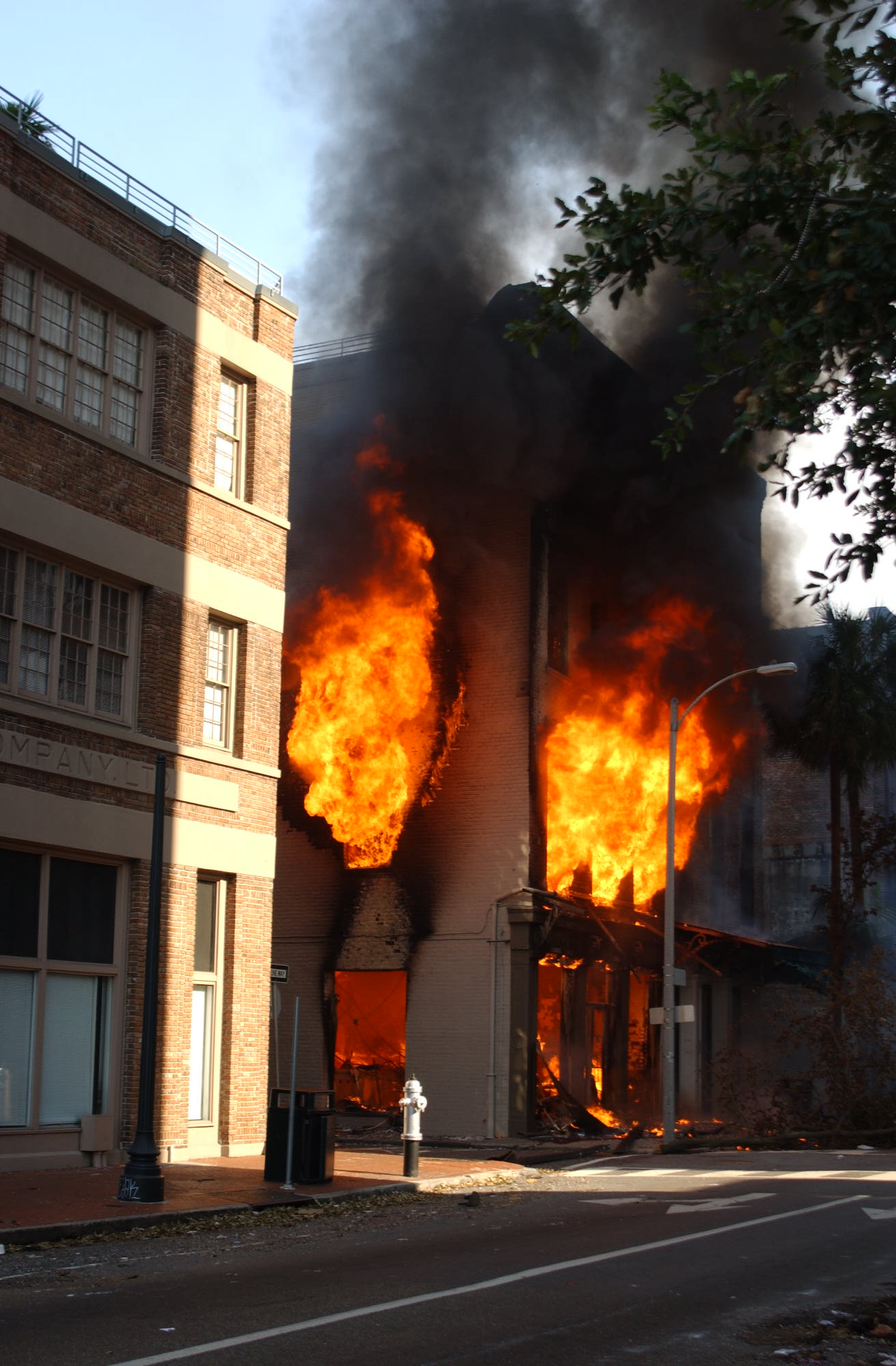
A fire in New Orleans

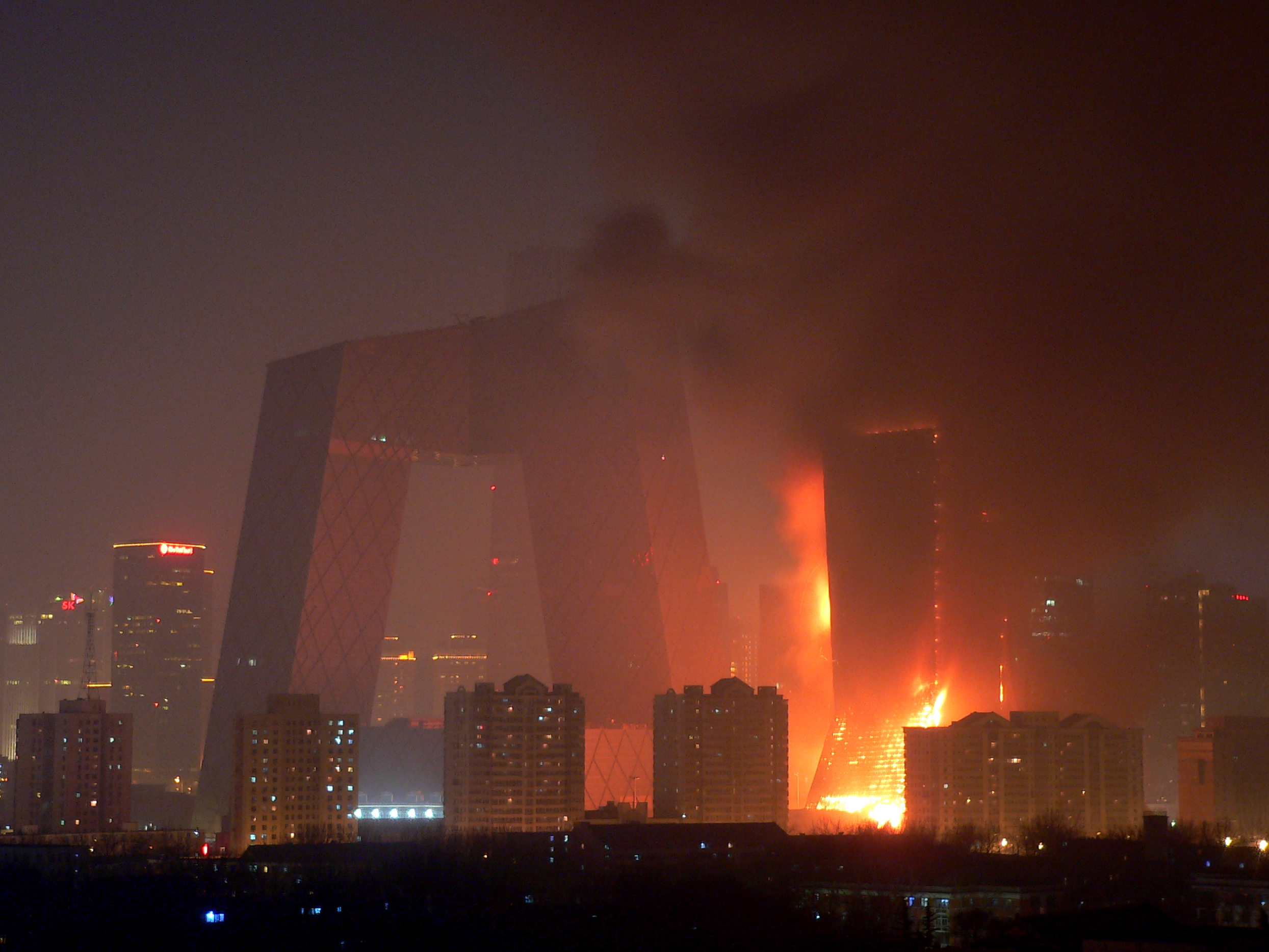
Beijing Television Cultural Center fire

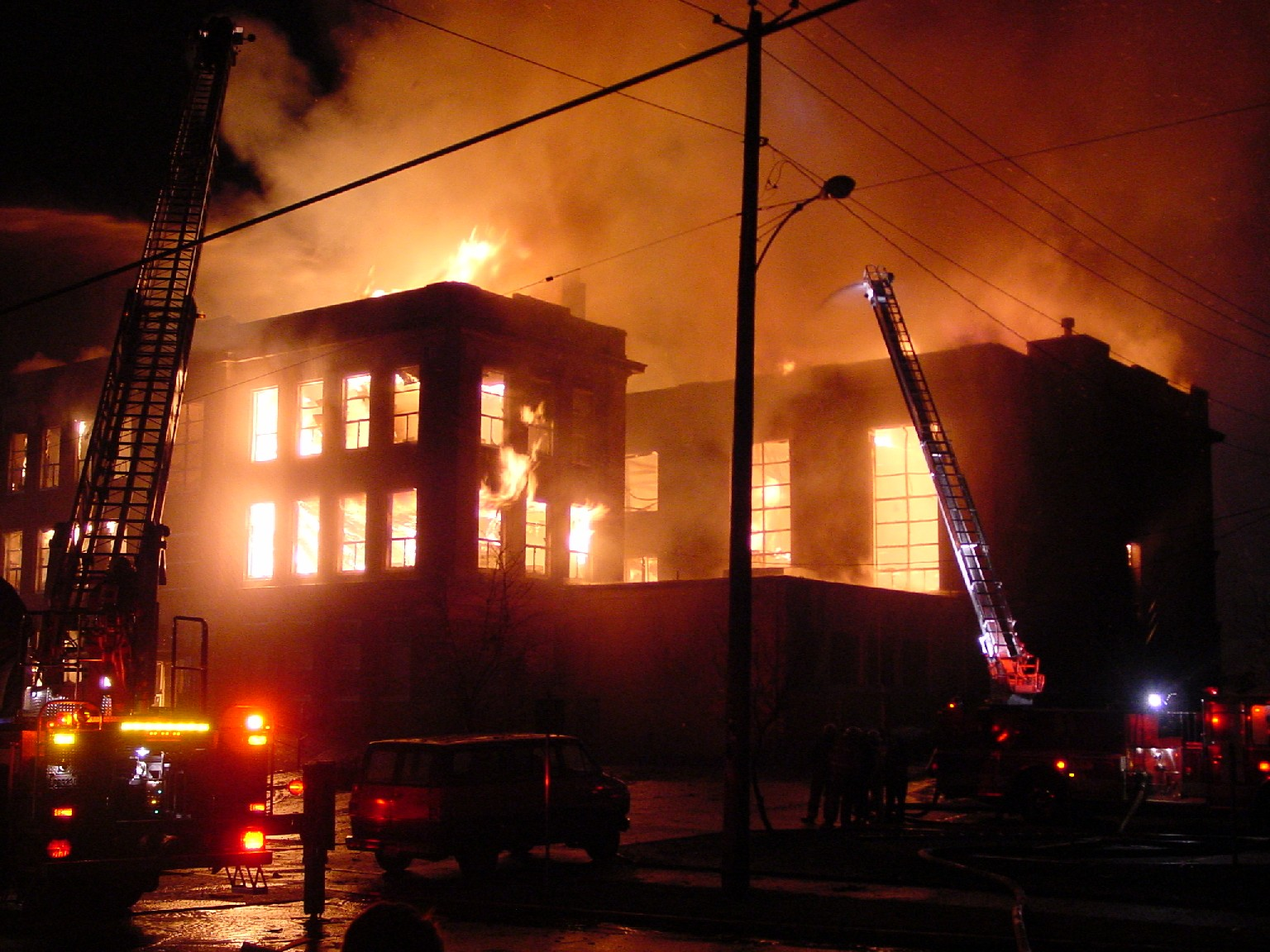
A fire in a school in Aberdeen, Washington

| Place | Year | Conflagration | Notes |
|---|---|---|---|
| Alexandria, Egypt | 48 BCE | Burning of the library of Alexandria | |
| Rome, Roman Empire | 64 | Great Fire of Rome | Large parts of ancient Rome destroyed |
| Bremen, Archbishopric of Bremen, Holy Roman Empire | 1041 | Fire of Bremen | Most of the old city including the cathedral destroyed |
| Lübeck, County of Holstein, Holy Roman Empire | 1157 | 1157 Fire of Lübeck | Destruction of the city |
| Lübeck, County of Holstein, Holy Roman Empire | 1251 | 1251 Fire of Lübeck | Triggered use of stone as a fire-safe building material |
| Lübeck, County of Holstein, Holy Roman Empire | 1276 | 1276 Fire of Lübeck | Northern part of old city destroyed. Triggered system of fire protection. Last fire until the bombing of WW II |
| Munich, Duchy of Bavaria, Holy Roman Empire | 1327 | Fire of Munich | Ca. 1/3 of the city destroyed |
| Bern, Switzerland | 1405 | 1405 Fire of Bern | 600 houses destroyed, over 100 deaths |
| Moscow, Tsardom of Russia | 1547 | 1547 Great Fire of Moscow | 2,700 to 3,700 fatalities; 80,000 displaced |
| Moscow, Tsardom of Russia | 1571 | 1571 Fire of Moscow | 10,000 to 80,000 casualties |
| London, England | 1613 | Burning of the Globe Theatre | During performance, cannon misfire caught the thatched roof on fire and the Theatre burned down |
| Aachen, Holy Roman Empire | 1656 | Fire of Aachen | 4,664 houses destroyed, 17 deaths |
| Edo, Japan | 1657 | Great Fire of Meireki | 30,000 to 100,000 fatalities, 60-70% of the city was destroyed |
| London, England | 1666 | Great Fire of London | 13,200 houses and 87 churches were destroyed (Including Old St. Paul's Cathedral) |
| Rostock, Holy Roman Empire | 1677 | 1677 Fire of Rostock | ca. 700 houses destroyed. Accelerated the city's economic decline at the end of the Hanseatic period |
| Copenhagen, Denmark | 1728 | Copenhagen Fire of 1728 | 1700 houses destroyed (28% of the city), 15,000 people made homeless |
| Tartu, Estonia | 1775 | Great fire of Tartu | Up to 2/3 of the city was destroyed |
| Copenhagen, Denmark | 1795 | Copenhagen Fire of 1795 | 900 houses destroyed, 6,000 people made homeless |
| Kyiv | 1811 | Great Podil fire | Over 2,000 houses, 12 churches and 3 abbeys razed, 30 deaths |
| Moscow, Russian Empire | 1812 | 1812 Fire of Moscow | Estimated that 75% of the city was destroyed |
| Hamburg, German Confederation | 1842 | Great Fire of Hamburg | 25% of the inner city destroyed |
| St. Louis, Missouri, U.S. | 1849 | Great St. Louis Fire | 430 homes and 23 ships destroyed, but only 3 dead |
| San Francisco, California, U.S. | 1851 | San Francisco Fire of 1851 | Destroyed as much as three-quarters of San Francisco |
| Newcastle and Gateshead, England | 1854 | Great fire of Newcastle and Gateshead | A series of fires and an explosion killed 53 and injured hundreds |
| Santiago, Chile | 1863 | Church of the Company Fire | 2,000 to 3,000 fatalities |
| Brisbane, Queensland, Australia | 1864 | Great Fire of Brisbane | Over four city blocks burned with over 50 houses razed and dozens of businesses |
| Atlanta, Georgia, U.S. | 1864 | Atlanta campaign during American Civil War | About 11/12ths of the city burned: more than 4,000 houses, shops, stores, mills, and depots; only about 450 buildings escaped damage |
| Portland, Maine, U.S. | 1866 | 1866 Great fire of Portland, Maine | 1800 structures destroyed on peninsula/downtown area; 10,000 left displaced and homeless |
| Peshtigo, Wisconsin, U.S. | 1871 | Peshtigo Fire | Resulted in most deaths by a single fire event in U.S. history (1500-2500) |
| Chicago, Illinois, U.S. | 1871 | Great Chicago Fire | 200 to 300 fatalities; 17,000 buildings were destroyed |
| Boston, Massachusetts, U.S. | 1872 | Boston Fire | Over 700 buildings destroyed |
| Minneapolis, Minnesota, U.S. | 1874 | Great Mill Disaster | 18 believed fatalities |
| New York City, U.S. | 1876 | Brooklyn Theater Fire | 273–300 fatalities |
| Hoboken, New Jersey, U.S. | 1900 | Great Hoboken Pier Fire | 4 ships burned, killing up to 400 people |
| Jacksonville, Florida, U.S. | 1901 | Great Fire of 1901 | 8-hour fire destroyed over 2,300 buildings and displaced almost 10,000 people |
| Chicago | 1903 | Iroquois Theater Fire | Deadliest single-building fire in U.S. history, with 602 victims |
| New York City | 1904 | Burning of the steamship General Slocum | Over 1,000 fatalities |
| San Francisco, California, U.S. | 1906 | Result of the 1906 San Francisco earthquake | Up to 3,000 victims; over 95% of city burned |
| Chelsea, Massachusetts, U.S. | 1908 | First Great Chelsea Fire | 1,500 buildings destroyed, 11,000 left homeless, when a fire at the Boston Blacking Company was fanned by 40 mph (64 km/h) winds and raced across the Chelsea Rag District, a several-block area of dilapidated wood-frame buildings housing textile and paper scrap. Half the city was destroyed. Same conditions and origin area of the Second Great Chelsea Fire (1973). |
| Idaho, U.S. | 1910 | Massive forest fire known as the Big Burn | 3,000,000 acres (12,000 km^{2}) burned out, 75 dead. |
| New York City | 1911 | Triangle Shirtwaist Factory Fire | Killed 146 garment factory workers; 4th deadliest industrial disaster in U.S. history |
| Tokyo, Japan | 1923 | 1923 Great Kantō earthquake | Fire broke out following the earthquake, half the city was razed and over 100,000 died |
| Columbus, Ohio, U.S. | 1930 | Ohio Penitentiary fire | 322 fatalities, 150 seriously injured |
| Berlin, Germany | 1933 | Reichstag Fire | Destruction of the Reichstag, seat of the German Parliament |
| Coventry, England | 1940 | Coventry Blitz | Over 800 fatalities; most of the city was destroyed |
| Stalingrad, U.S.S.R. | 1942 | Firestorm resulting from German air bombardment | 955 fatalities (original Soviet estimate) |
| Boston | 1942 | Cocoanut Grove fire | Nightclub fire killed 492 and injured hundreds more |
| Hamburg, Germany | 1943 | Firestorm resulting from air bombardment | 35,000 to 45,000 victims, 12 km^{2} (4.6 mi^{2}) of the city destroyed |
| Hartford, Connecticut, U.S. | 1944 | Hartford Circus Fire when tent burned | 168 killed and over 700 injured |
| Dresden, Germany | 1945 | Firestorm resulting from Allied bombing | Up to 25,000 fatalities during the three-day bombing; 39 km^{2} (15 mi^{2}) of the city destroyed |
| Tokyo, Japan | 1945 | Devastating conflagration resulting from B-29 raids during Operation Meetinghouse | Up to 100,000 fatalities and 41 km^{2} (16 mi^{2}) of the city destroyed; similar fires hit the Japanese cities of Kobe and Osaka |
| Hiroshima and Nagasaki, Japan | 1945 | Firestorm developed 30 minutes after the bombing of Hiroshima, but only a conflagration developed at Nagasaki | Atomic bombings of Hiroshima and Nagasaki (see nuclear explosion) |
| Texas City, Texas, U.S. | 1947 | Texas City disaster | Cargo ship Grandcamp caught fire and exploded, destroying most of the harbor and killing 600 people |
| Seaside Heights & Seaside Park, New Jersey, United States | 1955 | The Freeman Pier Fire | At least 30 businesses lost, 50 residents evacuated, no major injuries |
| Chicago | 1958 | Our Lady of the Angels School Fire | 95 fatalities, 100 wounded |
| Singapore | 1961 | Bukit Ho Swee Fire | 4 fatalities, over 2,800 homes destroyed, 15,694 people left homeless |
| Brussels, Belgium | 1967 | L'Innovation Department Store fire | 322 victims, 150 wounded |
| Gulf of Tonkin | 1967 | USS Forrestal fire | Fire aboard aircraft carrier during Vietnam War, killed 134 sailors and injured 161 |
| Tasmania, Australia | 1967 | 1967 Tasmanian fires | Severe wildfires that claimed 62 lives, 900 injured, displaced 7,000, and destroyed 264,000 hectares (2,640 km^{2}) of land including 1,293 homes |
| Chelsea, Massachusetts, U.S. | 1973 | Second Great Chelsea Fire | 18 city blocks destroyed when a firestorm raced across the Chelsea Rag District, a several-block area of dilapidated wood-frame buildings housing textile and paper scrap. The same conditions and origin area of the First Great Chelsea Fire (1908). |
| Southgate, Kentucky, U.S. | 1977 | Beverly Hills Supper Club fire | 165 fatalities |
| Minneapolis, Minnesota | 1982 | Minneapolis Thanksgiving Day Fire | Two people convicted of arson in setting fire to a Donaldson's department store, which in turn destroyed a full city block of downtown Minneapolis |
| San Juanico, Mexico | 1984 | San Juanico Disaster | Fire and explosions at a liquid petroleum gas tank farm killed 500-600 people and 5,000-7,000 others suffered severe burns; local town of San Juan Ixhuatepec devastated |
| Bradford, England | 1985 | Bradford City stadium fire | 52 victims |
| London | 1987 | King's Cross fire | Conflagration in London Underground station killed 31 people |
| Waco, Texas | 1993 | Mount Carmel Center, the compound of the Branch Davidians cult | Occurring on the final day of the Waco siege, resulting in deaths of 76 cult members; question of who actually started the fires remains unanswered |
| Dabwali, India | 1995 | Dabwali tent fire | 540 deaths |
| New York City and Washington, D.C., U.S. | 2001 | September 11 attacks | 2,606 victims killed in New York City as fires caused both twin towers of the World Trade Center to collapse, following impacts by two hijacked airliners. In Washington, D.C., 125 victims at the Pentagon were killed by the hijacked plane crash and subsequent fire. |
| West Warwick, Rhode Island, U.S. | 2003 | The Station nightclub fire | 100 killed and over 200 injured in fire at rock concert |
| Asunción, Paraguay | 2004 | Ycuá Bolaños supermarket fire | Almost 400 fatalities |
| Hemel Hempstead, England | 2005 | Hertfordshire oil storage terminal fire | The largest fire in peacetime Britain |
| Greece | 2007 | 2007 Greek forest fires | 84 victims in over 3,000 wildfires destroying 670,000 acres (2,700 km^{2}) of land |
| Victoria, Australia | 2009 | Black Saturday bushfires | 173 victims in over 400 separate bushfires which burned 450,000 hectares (4,500 km^{2}) |
| Near Haifa, Israel | 2010 | 2010 Mount Carmel forest fire | 44 victims, 12,000 acres (49 km^{2}) of bush/forest destroyed |
| Comayagua, Honduras | 2012 | Comayagua prison fire | 382 fatalities |
| Karachi and Lahore, Pakistan | 2012 | 2012 Pakistan garment factory fires | About 315 fatalities, over 250 injured in 2 fires on a single day |
| Santa Maria, Brazil | 2013 | Kiss nightclub fire | At least 232 fatalities and 117 hospitalized |
| Seaside Heights & Seaside Park, New Jersey, U.S. | 2013 | Boardwalk fire | At least 19 buildings destroyed, 30 businesses lost, no major injuries |
| Regional Municipality of Wood Buffalo, Alberta, Canada | 2016 | 2016 Fort McMurray Wildfire | Destroyed 2400 buildings and burned 589,552 hectares (1,456,810 acres) forcing the evacuation of 80,000 residents. |
| London, United Kingdom | 2017 | Grenfell Tower fire | On 14 June 2017, a fire broke out in Grenfell Tower, causing the deaths of 72 people and injured 74. |
| Sonoma County, California, U.S. | 2017 | Tubbs Fire | 36,807 acres burned, 5,400 structures destroyed, 22 fatalities |
| Paço de São Cristóvão, Rio de Janeiro, Brazil | 2018 | National Museum of Brazil fire | On 2 September 2018, a fire broke out at Paço de São Cristóvão in Rio de Janeiro, Brazil, which housed the 200-year-old National Museum of Brazil. The museum held more than 20 million items, of which almost 90 percent were lost. |
| Notre-Dame de Paris | 2019 | Notre-Dame de Paris Fire | The fire of the Cathedral of Notre-Dame de Paris was a violent fire that erupted in the Cathedral of Notre-Dame de Paris. It began at the end of the afternoon of April 15, 2019, on the roof of the building, causing considerable damage. The cathedral's needle and roof collapsed, and the interior and artefacts it housed were severely damaged. |
| Los Angeles County, California | 2025 | January 2025 Southern California wildfires | Between January 7th and 31st, 2025, 14 destructive wildfires burned in throughout Los Angeles County in California, United States. Due to environmental conditions, the wildfires grew into an urban conflagration. Leading to the death of more than 28 people, with more than 31 missing. More than 17,000 structures were destroyed. These were some of the most destructive fires in California's history. |
| Tai Po, Hong Kong | 2025 | Wang Fuk Court fire | On 26 November 2025, a fire spread across multiple blocks of the residential complex and killed 168 people. |

== See also ==
- Deflagration
- Fire department
- Fire investigation
