= Seaside, New Jersey =

Seaside, New Jersey may refer to one of the following municipalities in Ocean County, New Jersey:

- Seaside Heights, New Jersey
- Seaside Park, New Jersey
