= Seaside Music Festival =

Coordinates: 39.94332°N 74.07104°W

- Genre: Indie rock, Jam bands, Jazz, Americana, Bluegrass, Country, Folk, Gospel, Alternative rock, Hip hop, Reggae, Metal, Electronica, Funk, R&B
- Locations: Seaside Heights, Ocean County, New Jersey, USA
- Years active: 2008–2011

The Seaside Music Festival was an annual rain-or-shine, three-day festival held in Seaside Heights, New Jersey. The festival took place in various restaurants, bars, and other venues in Seaside Heights, New Jersey, featuring performances in various genres by local and touring bands from around the U.S. and the world. There were typically around 120 musical acts that performed at the festival.

== Festival History ==
Seaside Music Festival was founded by Indian and Mike Schwartz, and was produced by Motor Media. The festival began as an idea to produce a free concert on the beach, and quickly grew into a multi-venue free-admission music festival at the beach. The inaugural event included up-and-coming global bands that shared their talents in 15 venues other various activities.

Seaside Music Festival drew about 50,000 attendees each year. Past event attractions include:

- Live bands on multiple stages (bars, restaurants, outdoor)
- BMX and motorcycle stunt shows
- New Jersey Devils inflatable ice rink
- Billabong Surf Clinic
- Barooo Surf Shop Skimboard clinic
- The United Way Live United Village
- Vendor Village on the Boardwalk
- Car Show
- All-ages stage on the beach
- Casino Pier and boardwalk amusements, restaurants, and games open
- Saturday Night Fireworks
