= Seaside Heights Carousel =

- U.S. National Register of Historic Places
- New Jersey Register of Historic Places

- Location within Ocean County, New Jersey Location within New Jersey Location within the United States
- Location: 1401 Ocean Terrace, Seaside Heights, New Jersey
- Coordinates: 39°56′48.4″N 74°4′11.2″W
- Built: 1935
- NRHP reference No.: 100012756
- NJRHP No.: 5352

Significant dates
- Added to NRHP: February 27, 2026
- Designated NJRHP: January 6, 2026

The Seaside Heights Carousel, also known as the Dr. Floyd L. Moreland Carousel, is located on the boardwalk at 1401 Ocean Terrace in the borough of Seaside Heights in Ocean County, New Jersey, United States. It was documented by the Historic American Buildings Survey (HABS) in 1992 and was added to the National Register of Historic Places on February 27, 2026, for its significance in entertainment / recreation and art.

Seaside Heights Carousel Pavilion and Museum on the boardwalk

== See also ==
- National Register of Historic Places listings in Ocean County, New Jersey
- Amusement rides on the National Register of Historic Places
