= 2013 Seaside Park, New Jersey fire =

Coordinates: 39.93625°N 74.07174°W

- Date: September 12, 2013
- Time: around 2:05 p.m. EDT
- Location: Seaside Heights and Seaside Park, New Jersey, U.S.
- Cause: Accidental; Electrical
- Injuries: 3 (indirectly)

A large fire occurred on September 12, 2013 on the boardwalks and at the Funtown Pier of Seaside Heights and Seaside Park, New Jersey, on the Jersey Shore destroying more than 50 businesses.

== Fire ==
The fire was first reported at 2:05 p.m. EDT, underneath Kohr's Frozen Custard and Biscayne Candies on the boardwalk. The fire, driven by 30-40 mile per hour winds and tar roofing material, quickly spread to other businesses, including those recently rebuilt in the year since Hurricane Sandy. The fire destroyed more than 50 businesses on Seaside Park's end of the boardwalk, including the Funtown Pier amusement park, which resided on the border of Seaside Park and Seaside Heights. Embers blew for at least 8 blocks, igniting fires at the Casino Pier as well the Royal Sands Condominium complex at Sumner Avenue and Ocean Terrace, both of which were quickly extinguished.

At 6:39 p.m. EDT, New Jersey Governor Chris Christie arrived at the scene. The six-alarm fire was fought by over 400 firefighters from multiple counties, as well as crews from the New Jersey Forest Fire Service and the Port Authority of New York and New Jersey. Crews from Union County arrived with one of the state's three high-powered water cannon systems, originally purchased using Homeland Security funds to use in the event of a terrorist attack on oil tank fields. Firefighting efforts were hindered due to a lack of water from pipes damaged during Hurricane Sandy. Firefighters drew water from the Barnegat Bay across the island to fight the fire, as the ocean was deemed too rough to pump water. Emergency crews destroyed 25 feet of the boardwalk at Lincoln Avenue to create a fire line to help stop the fire from spreading north. Though wind created a challenge for firefighters and there were explosions in the buildings, it was brought under control by 7:45 p.m. EDT.

All roads leading into Seaside Heights and Seaside Park, including Route 35 and the Mathis and Tunney Bridges were closed into the following morning. Residents in towns as far north as Long Branch could smell the smoke from the fire.

== Injuries ==
No injuries were reported from the fire, however, three police officers were injured after falling off the back of a truck operated by Seaside Park Emergency Management.

== Investigation and cause ==
On September 17, 2013, authorities said the fire was accidental and linked it to electrical wiring under the boardwalk and subfloor, and equipment they say was compromised by Hurricane Sandy's floodwaters. Investigators said the fire originated under a building that housed a candy store and an ice cream stand.

== Aftermath ==
Seaside Park and Seaside Heights officials agreed in October 2013 to hire Eagle Paving Corp. to demolish and clean up the areas affected by the fire. The towns agreed to pay $4.7 million for the recovery work, which began in October 2013 and took around 60 days to complete.

The boardwalk was re-opened for the summer 2014 season. In July 2016, plans were scrapped for the rebuilding of Funtown Pier due to concerns from citizens and the planning board refusing to allow structures over 100' tall to be built.
