= Seaside Park, New Jersey =

Borough in Ocean County, New Jersey, US

- Borough
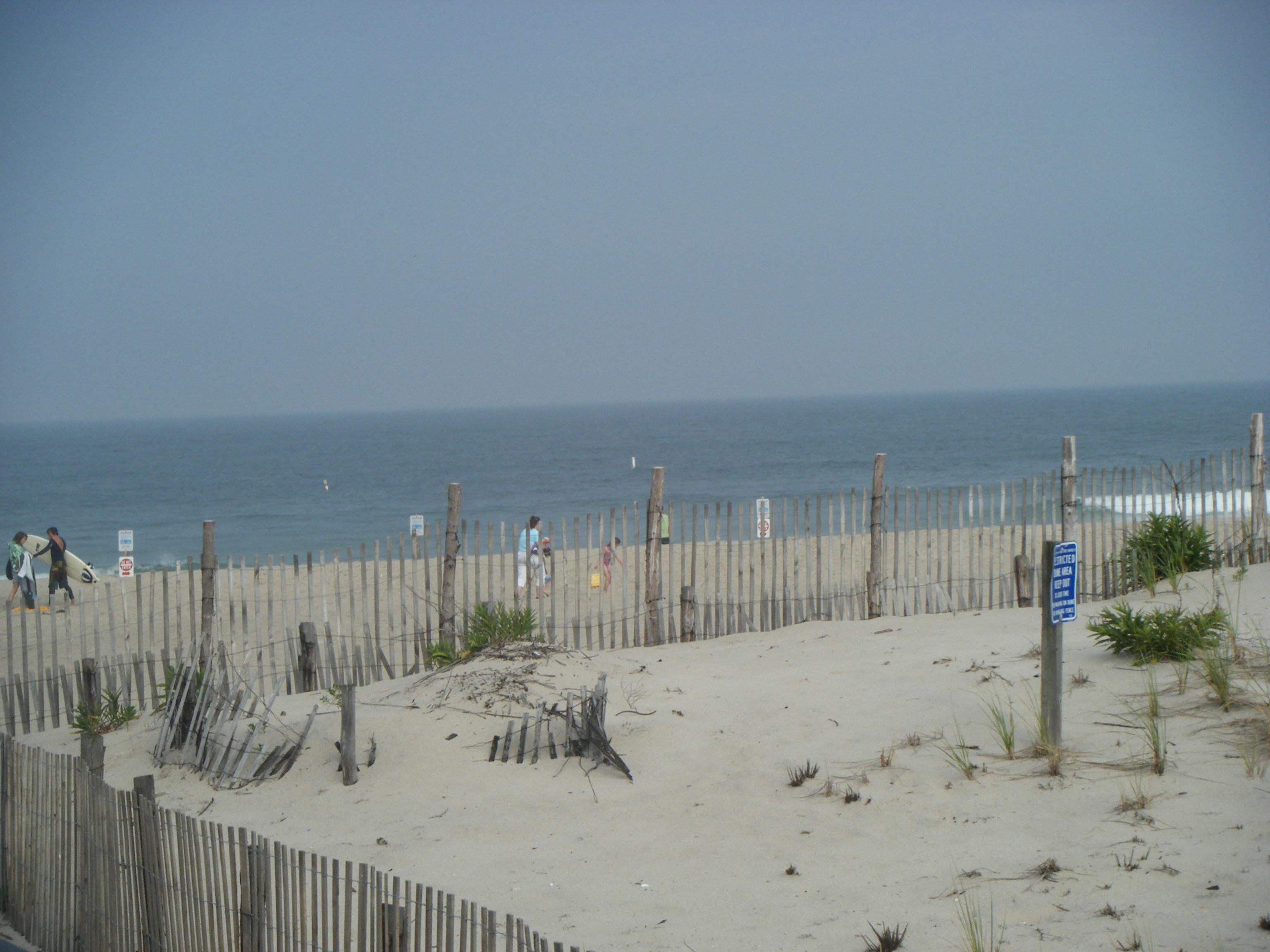
- Seaside Park beach

- Seal
- Motto: "The Family Resort"
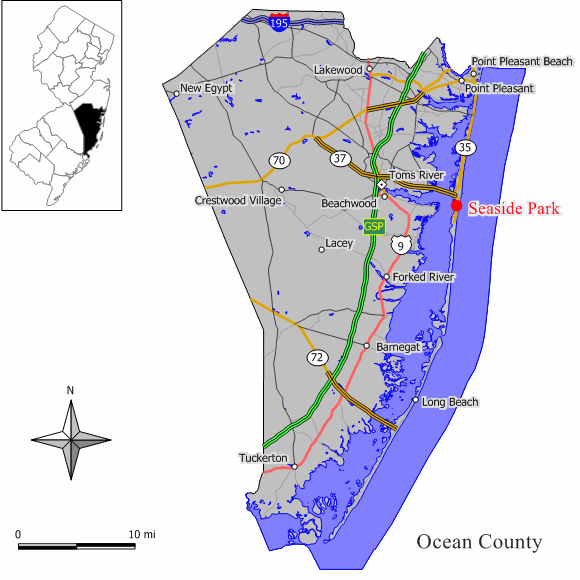
- Map of Seaside Park in Ocean County. Inset: Location of Ocean County highlighted in the State of New Jersey.

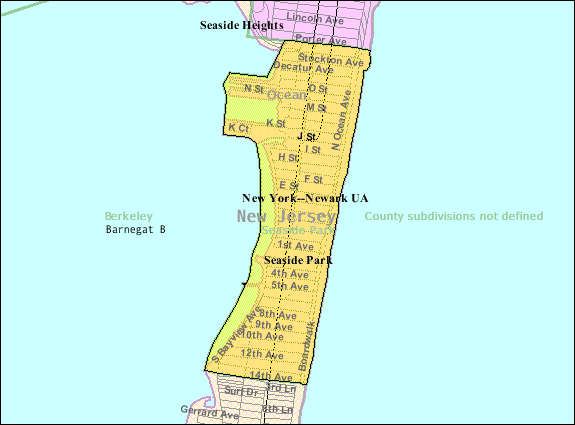
- Census Bureau map of Seaside Park, New Jersey

- Location in Ocean County Location in New Jersey Location in the United States
- Coordinates: 39.926369°N 74.078711°W
- Country: United States
- State: New Jersey
- County: Ocean
- Incorporated: March 3, 1898

Government
  - Type: Borough
  - Body: Borough Council
  - Mayor: John A. Peterson Jr. (R, term ends December 31, 2027)
  - Administrator: Karen Kroon
  - Municipal clerk: Jenna Jankowski

Area
  - Total: 0.81 sq mi (2.11 km^{2})
  - Land: 0.66 sq mi (1.70 km^{2})
  - Water: 0.16 sq mi (0.41 km^{2}) 19.51%
  - Rank: 521th of 565 in state 28th of 33 in county
- Elevation: 3 ft (0.91 m)

Population (2020)
  - Total: 1,436
  - Estimate (2024): 2,058
  - Rank: 515th of 565 in state 26th of 33 in county
  - Density: 2,192.5/sq mi (846.5/km^{2})
  - Rank: 280th of 565 in state 13th of 33 in county
- Time zone: UTC−05:00 (Eastern (EST))
  - Summer (DST): UTC−04:00 (Eastern (EDT))
- ZIP Code: 08752
- Area code: 732 Exchanges: 793, 830, 854
- FIPS code: 3402966480
- GNIS feature ID: 885391
- Website: www.seasideparknj.org

Seaside Park is a borough in Ocean County, in the U.S. state of New Jersey. It is part of the New Brunswick–Lakewood, NJ Metropolitan Division, which is part of the New York metropolitan area. As of the 2020 United States census, the borough's population was 1,436, a decrease of 143 (−9.1%) from the 2010 census count of 1,579, which in turn had reflected decline of 684 (−30.2%) from the 2,263 counted in the 2000 census. Seaside Park is situated on the Barnegat Peninsula, a long, narrow barrier peninsula that separates Barnegat Bay from the Atlantic Ocean.

== History ==
The first inhabitants of the barrier island were Lenape Native Americans who came in search of fish, crabs, clams, and scallops. They called this area "Seheyichbi," meaning land bordering the ocean. The Atlantic Ocean provided more than food; these people began using shells in place of wooden beads as their form of currency. These Native Americans, who stayed during the summer and went inland for winter, were part of the principal Algonquian tribe that lived mainly on and around the North American Seaboard. The Algonquians in New Jersey called themselves "Lenni Lenape", which means "original people."

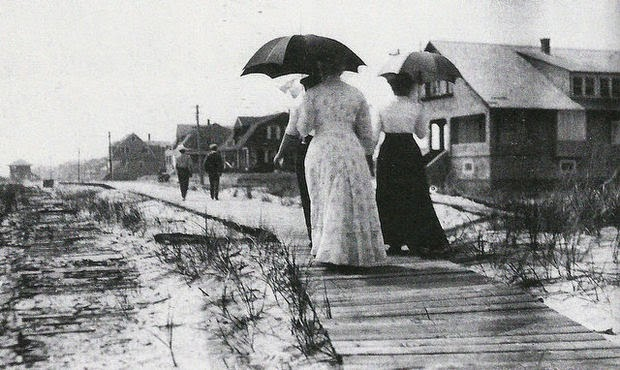
First boardwalk in Seaside Park (early 1900s)

What is now Seaside Park was a section of Dover Township (now known as Toms River Township) until the creation of Berkeley Township in 1875. The area then became known as the Sea Side Park section of Berkeley Township. Over the next 25 years, lots were sold, houses and roads were built, and the population of Seaside Park began to grow.

On March 3, 1898, New Jersey Senate President Foster M. Voorhees, the acting governor of New Jersey, signed a bill incorporating "Sea Side Park" as an independent borough, created from portions of Berkeley Township. Originally, the town ran from 14th Avenue to North Avenue, about half its present size. An area known as the Berkeley Tract, north of the original area of the borough, was annexed on or about May 12, 1900. The borough was named for its location on the Atlantic Ocean.

As the community grew, the name of the borough lost a space. In 1914, a newly appointed municipal clerk wrote the name of the borough as "Seaside Park" in the council minutes, combining the first two words. This practice continues to this day.

While Sea Side Park was going through the process of being incorporated, the Senate Amusement Company of Philadelphia was working on plans to build an oceanside attraction in Seaside Heights within feet of the border to Sea Side Park. Their plan was to build a covered pier to house a carousel. The structure was built in 1915 under the direction of Joseph Vanderslice of Senate Amusement Company. Budget issues caused the business to not open in 1916, and the amusement ride and building was subsequently sold to Frank Freeman. The combination of the completion of the Toms River Bridge on October 23, 1914, and the DuPont Avenue carousel and boardwalk are what likely led to the 219% population growth shown between the 1910 and 1920 censuses in Sea Side Park.

The earliest formal efforts to secede from Berkeley Township and have South Seaside Park become a part of Seaside Park began in 1973. In September 2014, residents of South Seaside Park submitted a petition to move from the township and become a part of Seaside Park borough, arguing that the neighborhood was 16 miles (26 km) away from the township's municipal offices and that there were minimal social connections with the rest of Berkeley Township. In 2025, the New Jersey Supreme Court approved the petition and agreed that South Seaside Park may leave the township and join Seaside Park borough. In March 2026, the borough voted to formally annex the South Seaside Park neighborhood and its 450 residents.

=== Disasters ===
On June 9, 1955, a malfunctioning neon sign component caused a fire at a shop on the corner of Ocean Terrace and DuPont Avenue. The fire was driven by winds estimated at 50 miles per hour (80 km/h), blowing the fire south and engulfing the entire pier. The fire was stopped at Stockton Avenue due in part to the fact that the boardwalk and pier ended there. In what became known as Freeman's Fire, a total of 85 buildings were destroyed with an estimated $4 million in damage from the conflagration.

On March 8, 1962, Seaside Park was affected by a nor'easter that had churned offshore for two days. The storm, which destroyed a large section of the borough's boardwalk, is variously referred to as the Ash Wednesday Storm, the Five High Storm and the Great March Storm of 1962.

On September 12, 2013, a ten-alarm fire swept from the Funtown Pier northward. The fire is believed to have started under the boardwalk, below the Kohr's Kustard stand at the southern end of the pier. The wind pushed it northward, and fire crews were able to make a stand at Lincoln Avenue by tearing up the newly replaced boardwalk which was destroyed less than a year before by Hurricane Sandy. Jack & Bill's Bar and Kohr's Kustard were two businesses that were destroyed in both the 1955 and 2013 fires.

On September 17, 2016, in the start of a series of localized bombings and attempted explosive device placements in the New York metropolitan area, a pipe bomb was deliberately placed in a trashcan next a beachfront parking meter and was remotely detonated, causing an explosion, but no immediate injuries or deaths were reported. The device was set by a lone perpetrator motivated by Islamic extremist and domestic terrorist ideology and hoped the bomb's intended target was the Seaside Semper Five, a 5K run taking place in the surrounding area during crowded venues. The run had been delayed due to unforeseen circumstances but was canceled soon after details of the explosion became clear.

== Geography ==
According to the United States Census Bureau, the borough had a total area of 0.81 square miles (2.11 km^{2}), including 0.66 square miles (1.70 km^{2}) of land and 0.16 square miles (0.41 km^{2}) of water (19.51%).

Unincorporated communities, localities and place names located partially or completely within the township include Berkeley.

The borough borders the Ocean County municipalities of Berkeley Township and Seaside Heights.

== Demographics ==
Historical population
Census	Pop.	Note	%±
1900	73		—
1910	101		38.4%
1920	179		77.2%
1930	571		219.0%
1940	653		14.4%
1950	987		51.1%
1960	1,054		6.8%
1970	1,432		35.9%
1980	1,795		25.3%
1990	1,871		4.2%
2000	2,263		21.0%
2010	1,579		−30.2%
2020	1,436		−9.1%
2024 (est.)	2,058	▲	43.3%
Population sources: 1900–2000 1900–1920; 1900–1910 1910–1930; 1940–2000 2000; 2010 2020

=== 2010 census ===
The 2010 United States census counted 1,579 people, 833 households, and 405 families in the borough. The population density was 2,429.4 inhabitants per square mile (938.0/km^{2}). There were 2,703 housing units at an average density of 4,158.7 per square mile (1,605.7/km^{2}). The racial makeup was 97.02% (1,532) White, 0.95% (15) Black or African American, 0.00% (0) Native American, 0.38% (6) Asian, 0.00% (0) Pacific Islander, 0.89% (14) from other races, and 0.76% (12) from two or more races. Hispanic or Latino of any race were 3.42% (54) of the population.

Of the 833 households, 12.5% had children under the age of 18; 34.7% were married couples living together; 9.6% had a female householder with no husband present and 51.4% were non-families. Of all households, 44.2% were made up of individuals and 16.3% had someone living alone who was 65 years of age or older. The average household size was 1.90 and the average family size was 2.60.

12.0% of the population were under the age of 18, 7.5% from 18 to 24, 19.4% from 25 to 44, 34.4% from 45 to 64, and 26.7% who were 65 years of age or older. The median age was 52.1 years. For every 100 females, the population had 93.0 males. For every 100 females ages 18 and older there were 92.5 males.

The Census Bureau's 2006–2010 American Community Survey showed that (in 2010 inflation-adjusted dollars) median household income was $39,271 (with a margin of error of +/− $13,400) and the median family income was $59,865 (+/− $24,222). Males had a median income of $61,019 (+/− $17,364) versus $52,083 (+/− $2,854) for females. The per capita income for the borough was $30,423 (+/− $6,397). About 19.1% of families and 24.3% of the population were below the poverty line, including 59.2% of those under age 18 and 7.0% of those age 65 or over.

=== 2000 census ===
As of the 2000 United States census there were 2,263 people, 1,127 households, and 606 families residing in the borough. The population density was 3,481.5 inhabitants per square mile (1,344.2/km^{2}). There were 2,811 housing units at an average density of 4,324.6 per square mile (1,669.7/km^{2}). The racial makeup of the borough was 97.79% White, 0.27% African American, 0.35% Native American, 0.62% Asian, 0.09% Pacific Islander, 0.18% from other races, and 0.71% from two or more races. Hispanic or Latino of any race were 2.30% of the population.

There were 1,127 households, out of which 16.3% had children under the age of 18 living with them, 41.3% were married couples living together, 8.9% had a female householder with no husband present, and 46.2% were non-families. 38.8% of all households were made up of individuals, and 16.1% had someone living alone who was 65 years of age or older. The average household size was 2.01 and the average family size was 2.61.

In the borough the population was spread out, with 14.4% under the age of 18, 6.2% from 18 to 24, 26.5% from 25 to 44, 27.9% from 45 to 64, and 25.1% who were 65 years of age or older. The median age was 47 years. For every 100 females, there were 95.6 males. For every 100 females age 18 and over, there were 94.6 males.

The median income for a household in the borough was $45,380, and the median income for a family was $58,636. Males had a median income of $42,813 versus $27,333 for females. The per capita income for the borough was $30,090. About 6.4% of families and 8.6% of the population were below the poverty line, including 16.3% of those under age 18 and 1.5% of those age 65 or over.

== Government ==
=== Local government ===
Seaside Park is governed under the borough form of New Jersey municipal government, which is used in 218 municipalities (of the 564) statewide, making it the most common form of government in New Jersey. The governing body is comprised of the mayor and the borough council, with all positions elected at-large on a partisan basis as part of the November general election. The mayor is elected directly by the voters to a four-year term of office. The borough council includes six members elected to serve three-year terms on a staggered basis, with two seats coming up for election each year in a three-year cycle. The borough form of government used by Seaside Park is a "weak mayor / strong council" government in which council members act as the legislative body with the mayor presiding at meetings and voting only in the event of a tie. The mayor can veto ordinances subject to an override by a two-thirds majority vote of the council. The mayor makes committee and liaison assignments for council members, and most appointments are made by the mayor with the advice and consent of the council.

As of 2025, the mayor of Seaside Park is Republican John A. Peterson Jr., whose term of office expires on December 31, 2023. Borough Council Members are Council President Martin E. Wilk Jr. (R, 2027), Ray Amabile (R, 2025), Gina Condos (R, 2025), Joe Connor (R, 2026), Bill Kraft (R, 2027) and Gerald S. Rotonda (R, 2026).

In July 2015, the borough council selected Frank "Fritz" McHugh from three candidates nominated by the Republican municipal committee to fill the seat expiring in December 2017 that had been held by Dave Nicola until his resignation; McHugh served on an interim basis until the November 2015 general election, when he was elected to serve the remaining year of the term of office.

=== Federal, state, and county representation ===
Seaside Park is located in the 4th Congressional District and is part of New Jersey's 10th state legislative district.

For the 119th United States Congress, New Jersey's 4th congressional district is represented by Chris Smith (R, Manchester Township). New Jersey is represented in the United States Senate by Democrats Cory Booker (Newark, term ends 2027) and Andy Kim (Moorestown, term ends 2031).

For the 2026–2027 session, the 10th legislative district of the New Jersey Legislature is represented in the State Senate by James W. Holzapfel (R, Toms River) and in the General Assembly by Paul Kanitra (R, Point Pleasant Beach) and Gregory P. McGuckin (R, Toms River).

Ocean County is governed by a Board of County Commissioners composed of five members who are elected on an at-large basis in partisan elections and serving staggered three-year terms of office, with either one or two seats coming up for election each year as part of the November general election. At an annual reorganization held in the beginning of January, the board chooses a director and a deputy director from among its members. As of 2025, Ocean County's Commissioners (with party affiliation, term-end year and residence) are:

John P. Kelly (R, 2025, Eagleswood Township), Virginia E. Haines (R, 2025, Toms River), Robert Arace (R, Manchester Township, 2027) Jennifer Bacchione (R, Berkeley Township, 2027) and Frank Sadeghi (R, 2026, Toms River).

Constitutional officers elected on a countywide basis are: Clerk Scott M. Colabella (R, 2025, Barnegat Light), Sheriff Michael G. Mastronardy (R, 2025; Toms River) and Surrogate Jeffrey Moran (R, 2028, Beachwood).

=== Politics ===
As of March 2011, there were a total of 1,349 registered voters in Seaside Park, of which 245 (18.2%) were registered as Democrats, 535 (39.7%) were registered as Republicans and 569 (42.2%) were registered as Unaffiliated. There were no voters registered to other parties. Among the borough's 2010 Census population, 85.4% (vs. 63.2% in Ocean County) were registered to vote, including 97.1% of those ages 18 and over (vs. 82.6% countywide).

Gubernatorial election results for Seaside Park
Year	Republican		Democratic		Third party(ies)	
Year	No.	%	No.	%	No.	%
2025	632	66.74%	310	32.73%	5	0.53%
2021	520	67.62%	243	31.60%	6	0.78%
2017	438	67.28%	203	31.18%	10	1.54%
2013	561	80.60%	123	17.67%	12	1.72%
2009	546	67.91%	208	25.87%	50	6.22%
2005	511	59.21%	323	37.43%	29	3.36%

In the 2012 presidential election, Republican Mitt Romney received 65.3% of the vote (484 cast), ahead of Democrat Barack Obama with 33.3% (247 votes), and other candidates with 1.3% (10 votes), among the 747 ballots cast by the borough's 1,375 registered voters (6 ballots were spoiled), for a turnout of 54.3%. In the 2008 presidential election, Republican John McCain received 62.2% of the vote (665 cast), ahead of Democrat Barack Obama with 34.4% (368 votes) and other candidates with 1.9% (20 votes), among the 1,069 ballots cast by the borough's 1,479 registered voters, for a turnout of 72.3%. In the 2004 presidential election, Republican George W. Bush received 62.2% of the vote (716 ballots cast), outpolling Democrat John Kerry with 36.1% (416 votes) and other candidates with 0.8% (12 votes), among the 1,151 ballots cast by the borough's 1,544 registered voters, for a turnout percentage of 74.5.

Presidential Elections Results
Year	Republican	Democratic	Third Parties
2024	66.1% 727	32.4% 356	1.5% 14
2020	62.8% 691	36.1% 397	1.1% 8
2016	67.0% 604	30.5% 275	2.5% 23
2012	65.3% 484	33.3% 247	1.3% 10
2008	62.2% 665	34.4% 368	1.9% 20
2004	62.2% 716	36.1% 416	0.8% 12

In the 2013 gubernatorial election, Republican Chris Christie received 80.6% of the vote (561 cast), ahead of Democrat Barbara Buono with 17.7% (123 votes), and other candidates with 1.7% (12 votes), among the 732 ballots cast by the borough's 1,299 registered voters (36 ballots were spoiled), for a turnout of 56.4%. In the 2009 gubernatorial election, Republican Chris Christie received 66.2% of the vote (546 ballots cast), ahead of Democrat Jon Corzine with 25.2% (208 votes), Independent Chris Daggett with 4.8% (40 votes) and other candidates with 1.2% (10 votes), among the 825 ballots cast by the borough's 1,383 registered voters, yielding a 59.7% turnout.

United States Senate election results for Seaside Park1
Year	Republican		Democratic		Third party(ies)	
Year	No.	%	No.	%	No.	%
2024	689	64.33%	372	34.73%	10	0.93%
2018	529	68.43%	227	29.37%	17	2.20%
2012	462	64.98%	226	31.79%	23	3.23%
2006	476	60.18%	294	37.17%	21	2.65%

United States Senate election results for Seaside Park2
Year	Republican		Democratic		Third party(ies)	
Year	No.	%	No.	%	No.	%
2020	689	64.45%	368	34.42%	12	1.12%
2014	387	62.32%	221	35.59%	13	2.09%
2013	319	68.45%	139	29.83%	8	1.72%
2008	616	62.10%	358	36.09%	18	1.81%

== Education ==
After the Seaside Park School District, which had served public school students in kindergarten through sixth grade, closed its school in 2010, a sending/receiving relationship was established with the Toms River Regional Schools for Seaside Park students in grades K–6.

In 2015, the Seaside Park district submitted a petition to the New Jersey Department of Education to allow Seaside Park to establish a second send / receive relationship with the Lavallette School District, under which Seaside Park students would have the choice of attending K–6 school in either Toms River or Lavallette. A number of students from Seaside Park had already been attending Lavallete Elementary School, including four of the five board of education members who voted in favor of the petition. The Lavallete district actively supported the proposal and the Toms River Schools had posed no objection when Seaside Park had originally submitted the petition. In 2017, the Appellate Division affirmed a decision by the commissioner of education to allow Seaside Park to establish the dual send / receive relationship with the Lavallette district, rejecting the claims made by the Toms River Schools and noting the fact that the district had posed no objection when Seaside Park had submitted a petition to advance the proposal in 2015.

Students in public school for seventh through twelfth grades attend the schools of the Central Regional School District, which also serves students from the municipalities of Berkeley Township, Island Heights, Ocean Gate and Seaside Heights. Schools in the district (with 2017–2018 enrollment data from the National Center for Education Statistics) are Central Regional Middle School for grades 7 and 8 (761 students) and Central Regional High School for grades 9–12 (1,401 students). The district's Board of Education consists of nine members, who are directly elected by the residents of the constituent municipalities to three-year terms of office on a staggered basis, with three seats up for election each year. Seaside Park is allocated one of the board's nine seats.

== Transportation ==
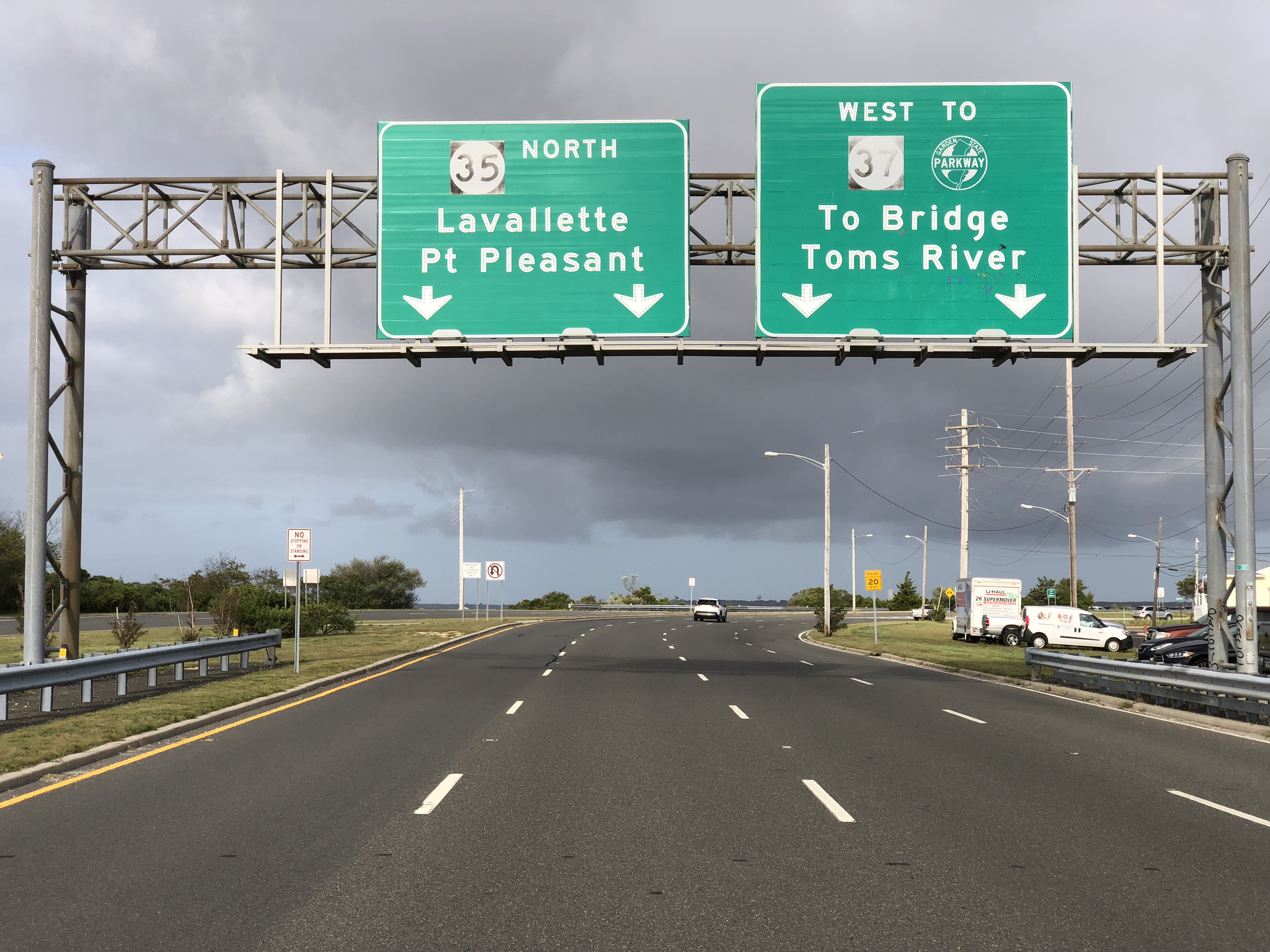
Route 35 northbound leaving Seaside Park

=== Roads and highways ===
As of May 2010, the borough had a total of 17.27 miles (27.79 km) of roadways, of which 10.77 miles (17.33 km) were maintained by the municipality, 4.62 miles (7.44 km) by Ocean County and 1.88 miles (3.03 km) by the New Jersey Department of Transportation.

Route 35 is the main highway serving Seaside Park. It extends south to Island Beach State Park and north to Route 37, which in turn provides access to the mainland and the Garden State Parkway.

=== Public transportation ===
NJ Transit provides seasonal bus service in Seaside Park on the 137 route to the Port Authority Bus Terminal in New York City.

== Climate ==
According to the Köppen climate classification system, Seaside Park has a humid subtropical climate (Cfa) with hot, slightly humid summers, cool winters and year-around precipitation. Cfa climates are characterized by all months having an average mean temperature above 32.0 °F (0.0 °C), at least four months with an average mean temperature at or above 50.0 °F (10.0 °C), at least one month with an average mean temperature at or above 71.6 °F (22.0 °C) and no significant precipitation difference between seasons. During the summer months in Seaside Park, a cooling afternoon sea breeze is present on most days, but episodes of extreme heat and humidity can occur with heat index values at or above 95.0 °F (35.0 °C). During the winter months, episodes of extreme cold and wind can occur with wind chill values below 0.0 °F (−17.8 °C). The plant hardiness zone at Seaside Park Beach is 7a with an average annual extreme minimum air temperature of 3.7 °F (−15.7 °C). The average seasonal (November–April) snowfall total is 18 to 24 inches (46 to 61 cm) and the average snowiest month is February which corresponds with the annual peak in nor'easter activity.

Climate data for Seaside Park Beach, NJ (1981–2010 Averages)
Month	Jan	Feb	Mar	Apr	May	Jun	Jul	Aug	Sep	Oct	Nov	Dec	Year
Mean daily maximum °F (°C)	40.5 (4.7)	43.0 (6.1)	49.6 (9.8)	59.3 (15.2)	69.1 (20.6)	78.3 (25.7)	83.4 (28.6)	82.4 (28.0)	76.3 (24.6)	65.7 (18.7)	55.5 (13.1)	45.6 (7.6)	62.5 (16.9)
Daily mean °F (°C)	32.8 (0.4)	34.9 (1.6)	41.3 (5.2)	50.6 (10.3)	60.4 (15.8)	69.8 (21.0)	75.1 (23.9)	74.1 (23.4)	67.7 (19.8)	56.4 (13.6)	47.2 (8.4)	37.7 (3.2)	54.1 (12.3)
Mean daily minimum °F (°C)	25.1 (−3.8)	26.8 (−2.9)	32.9 (0.5)	41.8 (5.4)	51.6 (10.9)	61.2 (16.2)	66.8 (19.3)	65.8 (18.8)	59.0 (15.0)	47.2 (8.4)	39.0 (3.9)	29.8 (−1.2)	45.7 (7.6)
Average precipitation inches (mm)	3.67 (93)	3.06 (78)	4.28 (109)	3.87 (98)	3.54 (90)	3.64 (92)	4.50 (114)	4.52 (115)	3.54 (90)	3.73 (95)	3.79 (96)	3.91 (99)	46.05 (1,170)
Average relative humidity (%)	65.5	63.1	61.3	62.3	65.3	70.1	69.4	71.5	70.3	69.6	68.3	66.4	66.9
Average dew point °F (°C)	22.5 (−5.3)	23.6 (−4.7)	29.0 (−1.7)	38.2 (3.4)	48.7 (9.3)	59.6 (15.3)	64.4 (18.0)	64.3 (17.9)	57.7 (14.3)	46.6 (8.1)	37.3 (2.9)	27.5 (−2.5)	43.4 (6.3)
Source: PRISM

Climate data for Sandy Hook, NJ Ocean Water Temperature (38 N Seaside Park)
Month	Jan	Feb	Mar	Apr	May	Jun	Jul	Aug	Sep	Oct	Nov	Dec	Year
Daily mean °F (°C)	37 (3)	36 (2)	40 (4)	46 (8)	55 (13)	62 (17)	69 (21)	72 (22)	68 (20)	59 (15)	51 (11)	43 (6)	53 (12)
Source: NOAA

== Ecology ==
According to the A. W. Kuchler U.S. potential natural vegetation types, Seaside Park would have a dominant vegetation type of Northern Cordgrass (73) with a dominant vegetation form of Coastal Prairie (20).

== Notable people ==
People who were born in, residents of, or otherwise closely associated with Seaside Park include the following:

- Gary Michael Cappetta (born 1952), professional wrestling ring announcer, author, voice over artist, screenwriter and stage performer
- Lawrence Dentico (born 1923), mobster, former captain and consigliere in the Genovese crime family
- John J. Horn (1917–1999), labor leader and politician who served in both houses of the New Jersey Legislature before being nominated to serve as commissioner of the New Jersey Department of Labor and Industry

Preceded by Seaside Heights	Beaches of New Jersey	Succeeded by Island Beach State Park
