= Seaside Heights, New Jersey =

Borough in Ocean County, New Jersey, US

- Borough
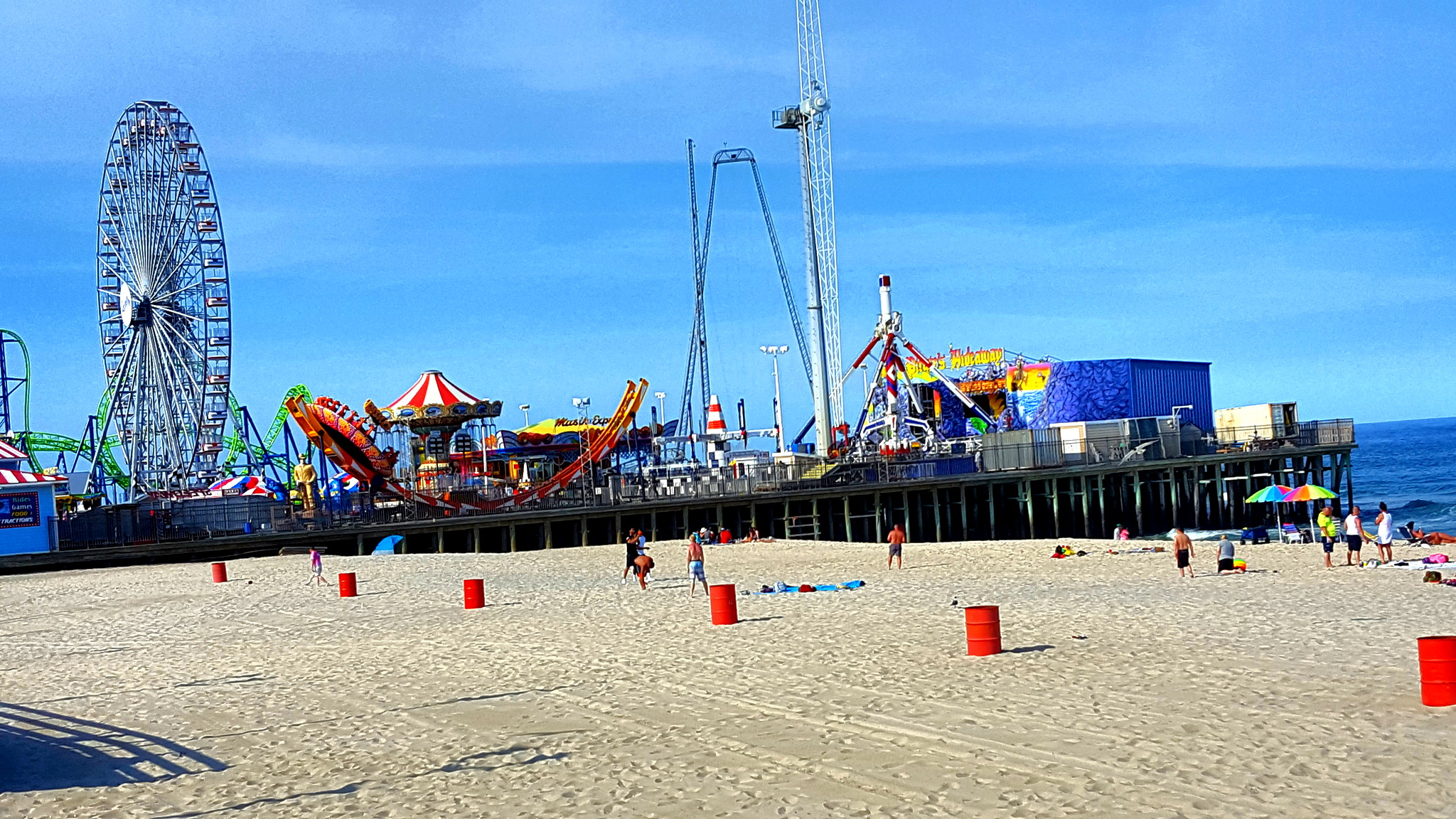
- Seaside Heights Casino Pier with amusement rides seen at left and the Atlantic Ocean to the right

- coat of arms
- Motto: Your home for family fun since 1913!
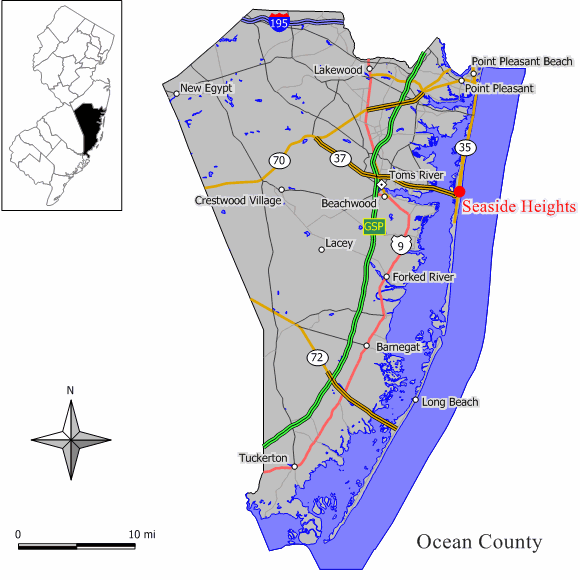
- Location of Seaside Heights in Ocean County. Inset: Location of Ocean County in the State of New Jersey.

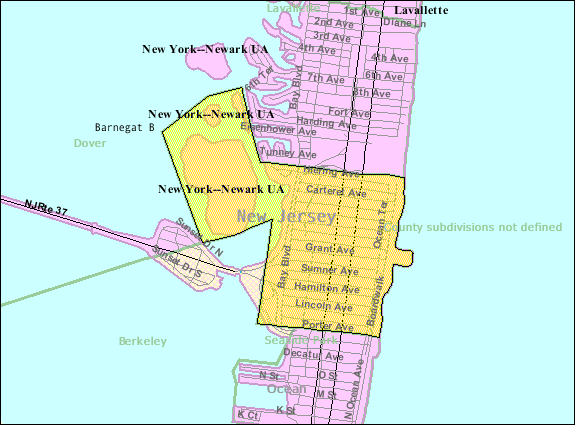
- Census Bureau map of Seaside Heights, New Jersey

- Location in Ocean County Location in New Jersey Location in the United States
- Coordinates: 39.944912°N 74.07829°W
- Country: United States
- State: New Jersey
- County: Ocean
- Incorporated: February 26, 1913

Government
  - Type: Borough
  - Body: Borough Council
  - Mayor: Anthony E. "Tony" Vaz (R)
  - Administrator: Christopher J. Vaz
  - Municipal clerk: Diane Stabley

Area
  - Total: 0.74 sq mi (1.92 km^{2})
  - Land: 0.62 sq mi (1.60 km^{2})
  - Water: 0.12 sq mi (0.32 km^{2}) 16.89%
  - Rank: 526th of 565 in state 29th of 33 in county
- Elevation: 3 ft (0.91 m)

Population (2020)
  - Total: 2,440
  - Estimate (2024): 2,522
  - Rank: 472nd of 565 in state 20th of 33 in county
  - Density: 3,952.9/sq mi (1,526.2/km^{2})
  - Rank: 161st of 565 in state 4th of 33 in county
- Time zone: UTC−05:00 (Eastern (EST))
  - Summer (DST): UTC−04:00 (Eastern (EDT))
- ZIP Code: 08751
- Area code: 732 exchanges: 793, 830, 854
- FIPS code: 3402966450
- GNIS feature ID: 0885390
- Website: www.seaside-heightsnj.org

Seaside Heights is a borough situated on the Jersey Shore, within Ocean County in the U.S. state of New Jersey. As of the 2020 census, the borough's population was 2,440, a decrease of 447 (−15.5%) from the 2010 census count of 2,887, which in turn had reflected a decline of 268 (−8.5%) from the 3,155 counted in the 2000 census. Seaside Heights is located on the Barnegat Peninsula, a long, narrow barrier peninsula that separates the Barnegat Bay from the Atlantic Ocean. During the summer, the borough attracts a crowd largely under the age of 21, mainly highschoolers and young adults, drawn to a community with boardwalk entertainment and one of the few shore communities with sizable numbers of apartments, attracting as many as 65,000 people who are often out until early morning visiting bars and restaurants.

Based on the results of a referendum held on March 25, 1913, Seaside Heights was incorporated as a borough by an act of the New Jersey Legislature on February 26, 1913, from portions of both Berkeley Township and Dover Township (now Toms River). The borough was named for its location on the Atlantic Ocean.

As a resort community, the beach, an amusement-oriented boardwalk, and numerous clubs and bars make it a popular destination. Seaside Heights calls itself, "Your Home For Family Fun Since 1913!" The beach season runs from March to October, with the peak months being July and August, when the summer population explodes to as many as 30,000 to 65,000. Route 37 in Toms River is routinely gridlocked on Friday afternoons in the summer months as vacationers travel to the barrier islands. The community is also known as the location of the hit MTV show Jersey Shore, with the director of the borough's business improvement district saying in 2010 that "we can't even calculate the economic benefit" to Seaside Heights from the continued presence of the show.

== History ==
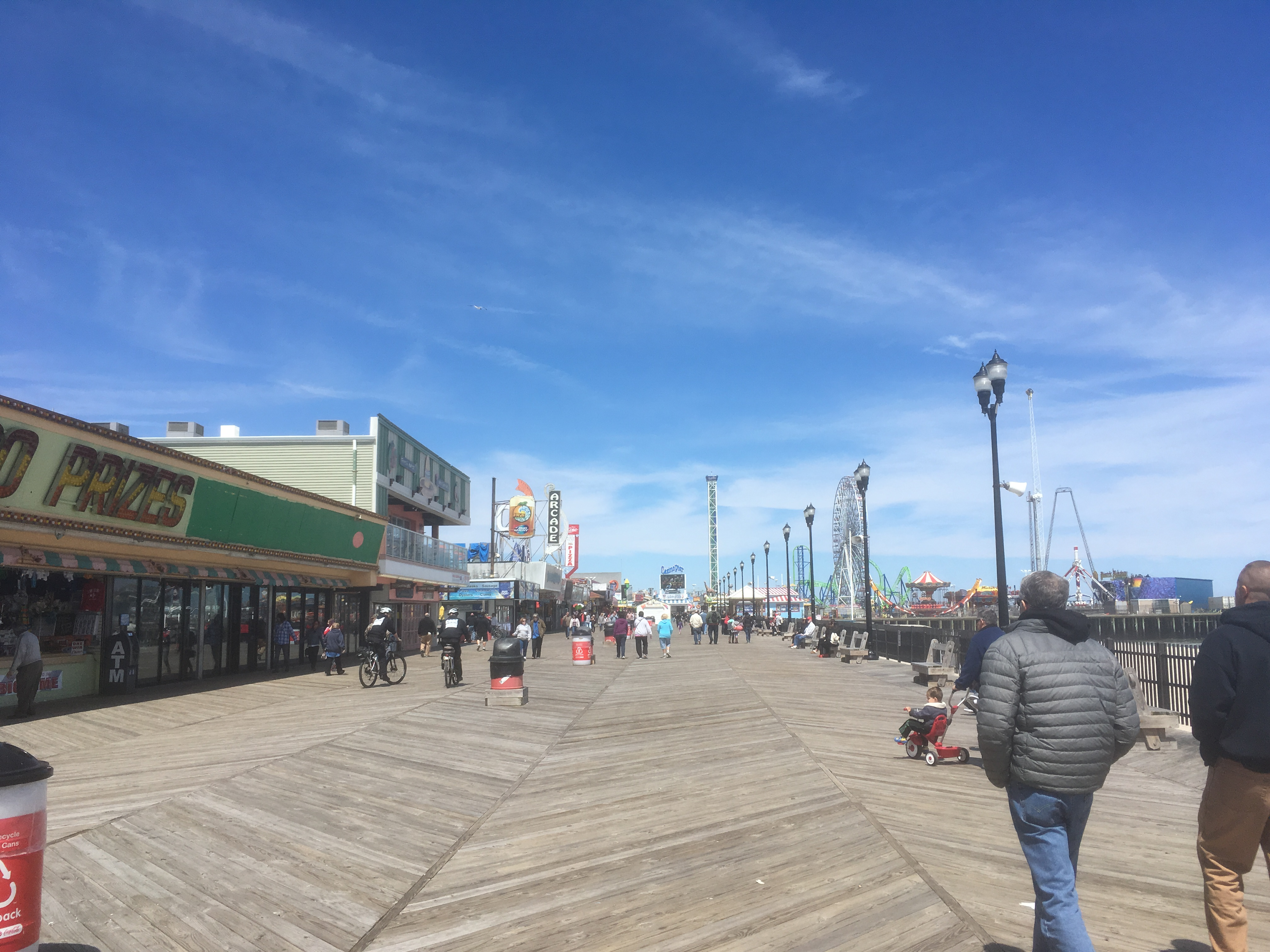
Seaside Heights boardwalk looking toward Casino Pier in 2017

In 1915, Senate Amusement Company of Philadelphia planned to build an ocean-side attraction in Seaside Heights within feet of the border to Seaside Park. Their plan was to build a covered pier to house a carousel. The structure was built in 1915 under the direction of Joseph Vanderslice of Senate Amusement Company. Budget issues stalled the project in 1916, and the amusement ride and building was subsequently sold to Frank Freeman. The combination of the completion of the Toms River Bridge on October 23, 1914, and the DuPont Avenue carousel and boardwalk are what likely led to the 159% population growth shown between the 1920 and 1930 censuses in Seaside Heights.

The Seaside Heights Carousel was constructed in 1935 using components from older carousels and was added in 2026 to the National Register of Historic Places.

=== Disasters ===
On June 9, 1955, a malfunctioning neon sign component caused a fire at a shop on the corner of Ocean Terrace and DuPont Avenue. The fire was driven by winds estimated at 50 miles per hour (80 km/h), blowing the fire south and engulfing the entire pier. The fire was stopped at Stockton Avenue due in part to the fact that the boardwalk and pier ended there. In what became known as Freeman's Fire, a total of 85 buildings were destroyed with an estimated $4 million in damage.

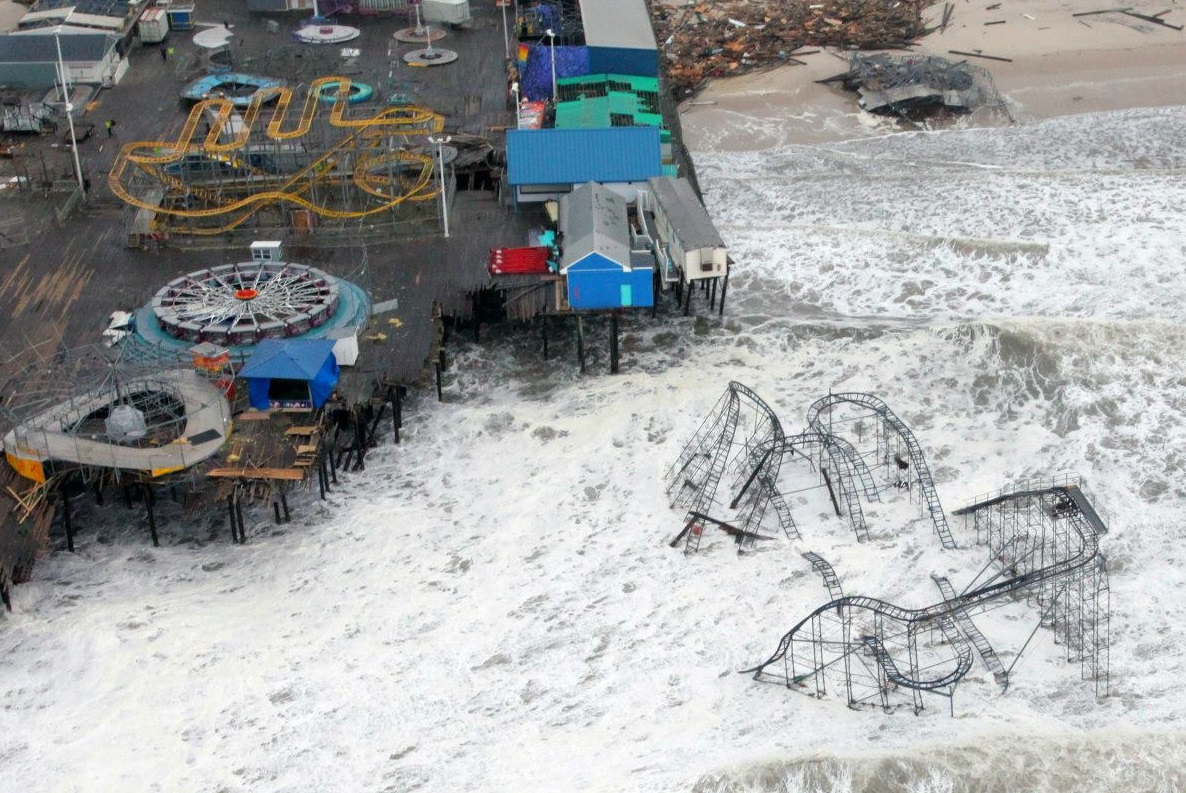
Star Jet roller coaster in the Atlantic Ocean after Hurricane Sandy

Beginning on October 29, 2012, substantial portions of the boardwalk were damaged and much of the borough was flooded as a result of Hurricane Sandy. Both the Funtown Pier and Casino Pier suffered major damage, with sections of both piers torn apart by powerful storm surges and waves causing many of the rides to collapse into the ocean. With a curfew set at 4:00 pm to prevent looting, a New Year's Eve party was held at the Beachcomber for hundreds of area residents at which the arrival of 2013 was celebrated at 3:00 in the afternoon. Casino Pier began cleanup attempts soon after, in an attempt to reopen in time for the summer 2013 season. The Star Jet roller coaster that fell into the water with the Casino Pier had become an attraction in itself. It was taken apart by a wrecker from Weeks Marine on May 14, 2013, just a short time after Prince Harry's visit to the site the same day with Governor Chris Christie. Repairs to the boardwalk were completed on June 21, 2013, with New Jersey's First Lady, Mary Pat Christie, hammering the nail into the final board of the project.

On September 12, 2013, a ten-alarm fire swept from the Funtown Pier northward. The fire is believed to have started under the boardwalk, below the Kohr's Custard stand at the southern end of the pier. The wind pushed it northward, and fire crews were able to make a stand at Lincoln Avenue by tearing up the newly replaced boardwalk which had been destroyed less than a year before by Hurricane Sandy. Jack & Bill's Bar and Kohr's Custard were two businesses that were both destroyed in the 1955 and 2013 fires.

== Geography ==
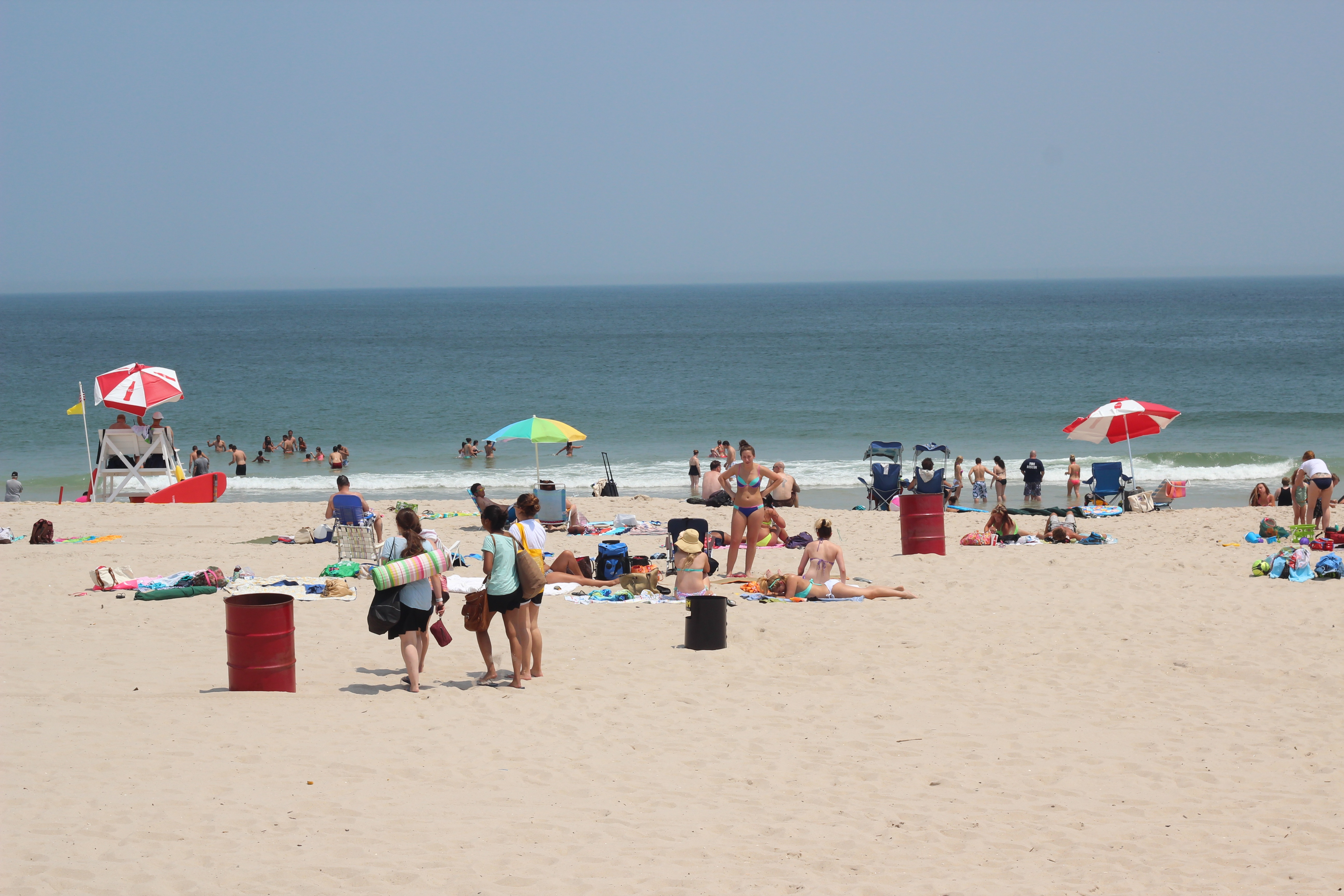
Seaside Heights beach.

According to the U.S. Census Bureau, the borough had a total area of 0.74 square miles (1.92 km^{2}), including 0.62 square miles (1.60 km^{2}) of land and 0.13 square miles (0.32 km^{2}) of water (16.89%).

Seaside Heights borders the Ocean County municipalities of Berkeley Township, Seaside Park and Toms River.

== Demographics ==
Historical population
| Census | Pop. | Note | %± |
|---|---|---|---|
| 1920 | 154 | | — |
| 1930 | 399 | | 159.1% |
| 1940 | 549 | | 37.6% |
| 1950 | 862 | | 57.0% |
| 1960 | 954 | | 10.7% |
| 1970 | 1,248 | | 30.8% |
| 1980 | 1,802 | | 44.4% |
| 1990 | 2,366 | | 31.3% |
| 2000 | 3,155 | | 33.3% |
| 2010 | 2,887 | | −8.5% |
| 2020 | 2,440 | | −15.5% |
| 2024 (est.) | 2,522 | ▲ | 3.4% |
Population sources: 1920–2000 1920 1920–1930 1940–2000; 2000 2010 2020

=== 2020 census ===
As of the 2020 census, Seaside Heights had a population of 2,440. The median age was 40.3 years. 19.2% of residents were under the age of 18 and 12.3% of residents were 65 years of age or older. For every 100 females there were 109.1 males, and for every 100 females age 18 and over there were 108.1 males age 18 and over.

100.0% of residents lived in urban areas, while 0.0% lived in rural areas.

There were 1,148 households in Seaside Heights, of which 21.9% had children under the age of 18 living in them. Of all households, 22.0% were married-couple households, 33.5% were households with a male householder and no spouse or partner present, and 33.4% were households with a female householder and no spouse or partner present. About 44.5% of all households were made up of individuals and 10.0% had someone living alone who was 65 years of age or older.

There were 2,870 housing units, of which 60.0% were vacant. The homeowner vacancy rate was 9.1% and the rental vacancy rate was 13.9%.

Racial composition as of the 2020 census
| Race | Number | Percent |
|---|---|---|
| White | 1,676 | 68.7% |
| Black or African American | 153 | 6.3% |
| American Indian and Alaska Native | 44 | 1.8% |
| Asian | 36 | 1.5% |
| Native Hawaiian and Other Pacific Islander | 0 | 0.0% |
| Some other race | 201 | 8.2% |
| Two or more races | 330 | 13.5% |
| Hispanic or Latino (of any race) | 566 | 23.2% |

=== 2010 census ===
The 2010 United States census counted 2,887 people, 1,376 households, and 586 families in the borough. The population density was 4,662.9 inhabitants per square mile (1,800.4/km^{2}). There were 3,003 housing units at an average density of 4,850.2 per square mile (1,872.7/km^{2}). The racial makeup was 80.74% (2,331) White, 6.69% (193) Black or African American, 0.59% (17) Native American, 1.52% (44) Asian, 0.00% (0) Pacific Islander, 6.96% (201) from other races, and 3.50% (101) from two or more races. Hispanic or Latino of any race were 17.87% (516) of the population.

Of the 1,376 households, 20.5% had children under the age of 18; 21.0% were married couples living together; 14.9% had a female householder with no husband present and 57.4% were non-families. Of all households, 46.0% were made up of individuals and 6.6% had someone living alone who was 65 years of age or older. The average household size was 2.10 and the average family size was 3.03.

19.7% of the population were under the age of 18, 10.8% from 18 to 24, 32.5% from 25 to 44, 28.6% from 45 to 64, and 8.3% who were 65 years of age or older. The median age was 36.2 years. For every 100 females, the population had 112.3 males. For every 100 females ages 18 and older there were 113.2 males.

The Census Bureau's 2006–2010 American Community Survey showed that (in 2010 inflation-adjusted dollars) median household income was $33,380 (with a margin of error of +/− $12,171) and the median family income was $39,688 (+/− $28,475). Males had a median income of $46,005 (+/− $18,386) versus $18,928 (+/− $13,004) for females. The per capita income for the borough was $19,865 (+/− $4,981). About 37.0% of families and 33.3% of the population were below the poverty line, including 73.5% of those under age 18 and none of those age 65 or over.

=== 2000 census ===
As of the 2000 United States census, there were 3,155 persons, 1,408 households, and 691 families residing in the borough. The population density was 5,162.2 inhabitants per square mile (1,993.1/km^{2}). There were 2,840 housing units at an average density of 4,646.8 per square mile (1,794.1/km^{2}). The racial makeup of the borough was 89.95% White, 4.03% African American, 0.63% Native American, 0.86% Asian, 1.17% from other races, and 3.36% from two or more races. Hispanic or Latino of any race were 9.70% of the population.

There were 1,408 households, out of which 25.6% had children under the age of 18 living with them, 26.8% were married couples living together, 16.3% had a female householder with no husband present, and 50.9% were non-families. 40.1% of all households were made up of individuals, and 9.0% had someone living alone who was 65 years of age or older. The average household size was 2.17 and the average family size was 2.93.

In the borough, the population was spread out, with 23.3% under the age of 18, 10.9% from 18 to 24, 35.4% from 25 to 44, 19.3% from 45 to 64, and 11.0% who were 65 years of age or older. The median age was 33 years. For every 100 females, there were 106.5 males. For every 100 females age 18 and over, there were 102.8 males.

The median income for a household in the borough was $25,963, and the median income for a family was $27,197. Males had a median income of $30,354 versus $21,899 for females. The per capita income for the borough was $18,665. About 21.9% of families and 24.1% of the population were below the poverty line, including 37.9% of those under age 18 and 12.3% of those age 65 or over.

== Sports ==
Seaside Heights hosted the Association of Volleyball Professionals volleyball tournament for two years during the summers of 2006 and 2007 with participants competing for a $200,000 purse.

== Parks and recreation ==
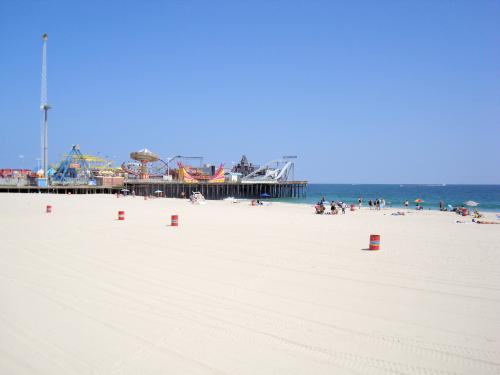
Casino Pier, 2007

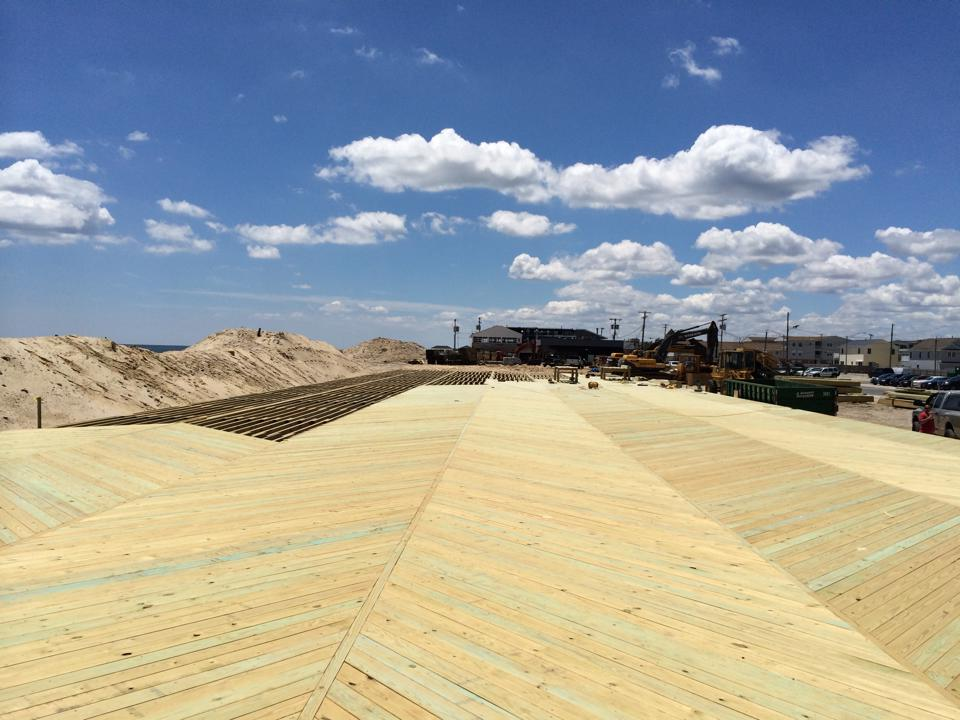
Funtown Pier boardwalk under construction following the fire and Hurricane Sandy, 2014.

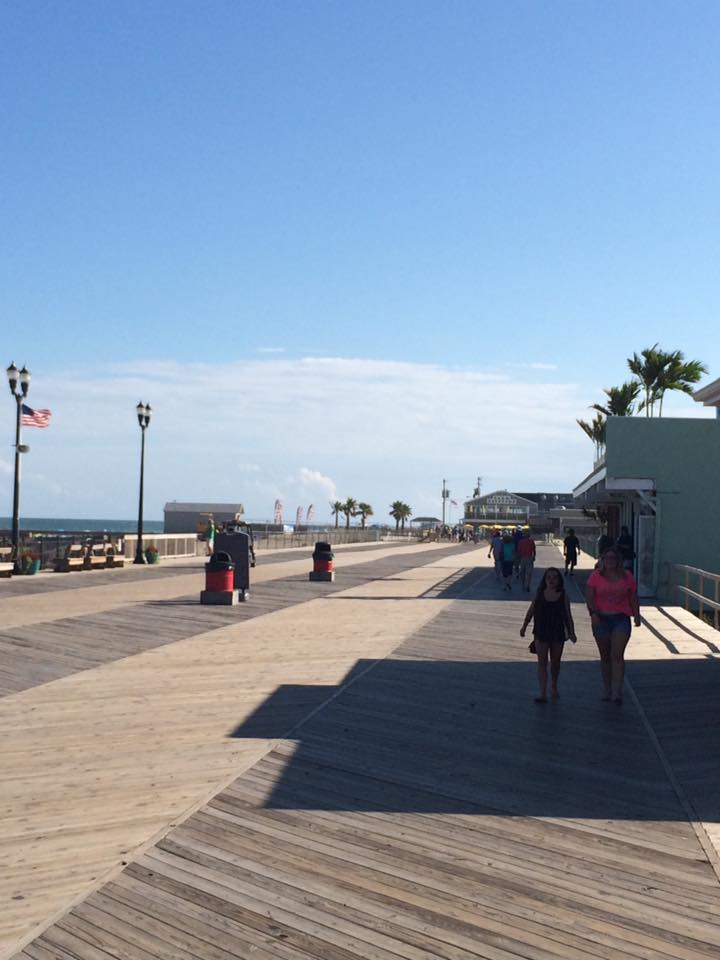
Funtown Pier boardwalk all fixed up in 2016

Casino Pier and Funtown Pier (partially located within both Seaside Heights and neighboring Seaside Park) are amusement parks, each situated on a pier extending approximately 300 feet (100 m) into the Atlantic Ocean. Each of the two piers are part of a boardwalk that stretches for 2 miles (3.2 km) and offers many family-friendly attractions ranging from arcades, to games of chance, to beaches, and to the wide variety of foods and desserts, all within walking distance. Breakwater Beach (formerly known as Water Works) is a water park situated across the street from Casino Pier.

== Government ==
Seaside Heights is governed under the borough form of New Jersey municipal government, which is used in 218 municipalities (of the 564) statewide, making it the most common form of government in New Jersey. The governing body is composed of the mayor and the borough council, with all positions elected at-large on a partisan basis as part of the November general election. A mayor is elected directly by the voters to a four-year term of office. The borough council includes six members elected to serve three-year terms on a staggered basis, with two seats coming up for election each year in a three-year cycle. The borough form of government used by Seaside Heights is a "weak mayor / strong council" government in which council members act as the legislative body with the mayor presiding at meetings and voting only in the event of a tie. The mayor can veto ordinances subject to an override by a two-thirds majority vote of the council. The mayor makes committee and liaison assignments for council members, and most appointments are made by the mayor with the advice and consent of the council.

As of 2022, the mayor of Seaside Heights is Republican Anthony E. "Tony" Vaz, whose term of office ends December 31, 2023. Borough Council members are Council President Mike Carbone (R, 2023), Vito M. Ferrone (R, 2022), Victoria Graichen (R, 2024), Agnes Polhemus (R, 2023), Harry Smith (R, 2024) and Richard Tompkins (R, 2022).

In July 2015, Bill Akers resigned from office as mayor to accept a position with the borough as a code enforcement officer. The borough council appointed councilmember Tony Vaz to fill the term ending in December 2015. In August 2015, the borough council selected Michael Carbone to fill the vacant council seat expiring in December 2017 of Anthony Vaz.

In the November 2011 general election, William Akers was elected to a four-year term as mayor and incumbent councilmembers Agnes Polhemus and Anthony E. Vaz were elected to three-year terms on the borough council. The three Republicans will take their new seats in January 2012.

Mayor Hershey had been in politics in Seaside Heights uninterrupted for over 35 years and had been first elected as mayor in 1992. His predecessor George Tompkins (father of current councilman Rich Tompkins) served 16 years from 1975 to 1991, and Mayor J. Stanley Tunney served for 25 years from 1939 to 1964. Councilwoman Agnes Polhemus served from 1972 to 1993, and returned in 2006. Joann Duszczak served on the borough council for more than a decade before her death in December 2010.

Seaside Heights Borough Attorney George R. Gilmore is grandson of the late Seaside Heights mayor J. Stanley Tunney and is the Ocean County Republican chairman.

=== Federal, state, and county representation ===
Seaside Heights is located in the 4th Congressional District and is part of New Jersey's 10th state legislative district.

For the 119th United States Congress, New Jersey's 4th congressional district is represented by Chris Smith (R, Manchester Township). New Jersey is represented in the United States Senate by Democrats Cory Booker (Newark, term ends 2027) and Andy Kim (Moorestown, term ends 2031).

For the 2026–2027 session, the 10th legislative district of the New Jersey Legislature is represented in the State Senate by James W. Holzapfel (R, Toms River) and in the General Assembly by Paul Kanitra (R, Point Pleasant Beach) and Gregory P. McGuckin (R, Toms River).

Ocean County is governed by a Board of County Commissioners composed of five members who are elected on an at-large basis in partisan elections and serving staggered three-year terms of office, with either one or two seats coming up for election each year as part of the November general election. At an annual reorganization held in the beginning of January, the board chooses a director and a deputy director from among its members. As of 2025, Ocean County's Commissioners (with party affiliation, term-end year and residence) are:

John P. Kelly (R, 2025, Eagleswood Township), Virginia E. Haines (R, 2025, Toms River), Robert Arace (R, Manchester Township, 2027) Jennifer Bacchione (R, Berkeley Township, 2027) and Frank Sadeghi (R, 2026, Toms River).

Constitutional officers elected on a countywide basis are: Clerk Scott M. Colabella (R, 2025, Barnegat Light), Sheriff Michael G. Mastronardy (R, 2025; Toms River) and Surrogate Jeffrey Moran (R, 2028, Beachwood).

=== Politics ===
As of March 2011, there were a total of 1,374 registered voters in Seaside Heights, of which 186 (13.5%) were registered as Democrats, 420 (30.6%) were registered as Republicans and 768 (55.9%) were registered as Unaffiliated. There were no voters registered to other parties. Among the borough's 2010 Census population, 47.6% (vs. 63.2% in Ocean County) were registered to vote, including 59.3% of those ages 18 and over (vs. 82.6% countywide).

Gubernatorial election results for Seaside Heights
| Year | Republican | | Democratic | | Third party(ies) | |
| Year | No. | % | No. | % | No. | % |
|---|---|---|---|---|---|---|
| 2025 | 427 | 64.60% | 231 | 34.95% | 3 | 0.45% |
| 2021 | 379 | 67.68% | 176 | 31.43% | 5 | 0.89% |
| 2017 | 233 | 63.14% | 128 | 34.69% | 8 | 2.17% |
| 2013 | 253 | 79.06% | 61 | 19.06% | 6 | 1.88% |
| 2009 | 322 | 66.12% | 128 | 26.28% | 37 | 7.60% |
| 2005 | 233 | 51.21% | 196 | 43.08% | 26 | 5.71% |

In the 2012 presidential election, Republican Mitt Romney received 51.8% of the vote (231 cast), ahead of Democrat Barack Obama with 46.0% (205 votes), and other candidates with 2.2% (10 votes), among the 466 ballots cast by the borough's 1,517 registered voters (20 ballots were spoiled), for a turnout of 30.7%. In the 2008 presidential election, Republican John McCain received 53.5% of the vote (394 cast), ahead of Democrat Barack Obama with 44.2% (326 votes) and other candidates with 1.6% (12 votes), among the 737 ballots cast by the borough's 1,605 registered voters, for a turnout of 45.9%. In the 2004 presidential election, Republican George W. Bush received 55.1% of the vote (440 ballots cast), outpolling Democrat John Kerry with 43.4% (347 votes) and other candidates with 0.4% (7 votes), among the 799 ballots cast by the borough's 1,694 registered voters, for a turnout percentage of 47.2.

Presidential Elections Results
| Year | Republican | Democratic | Third Parties |
|---|---|---|---|
| 2024 | 65.2% 615 | 32.1% 303 | 2.7% 19 |
| 2020 | 61.6% 630 | 36.3% 371 | 2.1% 13 |
| 2016 | 68.9% 459 | 26.9% 179 | 4.2% 28 |
| 2012 | 51.8% 231 | 46.0% 205 | 2.2% 10 |
| 2008 | 53.5% 394 | 44.2% 326 | 1.6% 12 |
| 2004 | 55.1% 440 | 43.4% 347 | 0.4% 7 |

In the 2013 gubernatorial election, Republican Chris Christie received 79.1% of the vote (253 cast), ahead of Democrat Barbara Buono with 19.1% (61 votes), and other candidates with 1.9% (6 votes), among the 327 ballots cast by the borough's 1,169 registered voters (7 ballots were spoiled), for a turnout of 28.0%. In the 2009 gubernatorial election, Republican Chris Christie received 64.4% of the vote (322 ballots cast), ahead of Democrat Jon Corzine with 25.6% (128 votes), Independent Chris Daggett with 5.8% (29 votes) and other candidates with 1.6% (8 votes), among the 500 ballots cast by the borough's 1,476 registered voters, yielding a 33.9% turnout.

United States Senate election results for Seaside Heights1
| Year | Republican | | Democratic | | Third party(ies) | |
| Year | No. | % | No. | % | No. | % |
|---|---|---|---|---|---|---|
| 2024 | 546 | 62.98% | 314 | 36.22% | 7 | 0.81% |
| 2018 | 358 | 68.19% | 158 | 30.10% | 9 | 1.71% |
| 2012 | 462 | 64.98% | 226 | 31.79% | 23 | 3.23% |
| 2006 | 210 | 56.45% | 142 | 38.17% | 20 | 5.38% |

United States Senate election results for Seaside Heights2
| Year | Republican | | Democratic | | Third party(ies) | |
| Year | No. | % | No. | % | No. | % |
|---|---|---|---|---|---|---|
| 2020 | 590 | 60.57% | 371 | 38.09% | 13 | 1.33% |
| 2014 | 175 | 64.58% | 91 | 33.58% | 5 | 1.85% |
| 2013 | 113 | 69.75% | 48 | 29.63% | 1 | 0.62% |
| 2008 | 337 | 51.14% | 298 | 45.22% | 24 | 3.64% |

== Education ==
The Seaside Heights School District is a public school district for students in pre-kindergarten through sixth grade at Hugh J. Boyd Jr. Elementary School. As of the 2020–21 school year, the district, comprised of one school, had an enrollment of 222 students and 24.5 classroom teachers (on an FTE basis), for a student–teacher ratio of 9.1:1. The original school facility, Seaside Heights Elementary School, was built in 1926 and later demolished after the opening of a larger school building on the bay front. The current school was built in the late 1960s, and is dedicated to Hugh J. Boyd Jr., its longtime superintendent of schools who died in 1983. The district's Early Childhood Center addition was dedicated in 2007 in the name of longtime Board of Education Member Harry M. Smith III.

Public school students in seventh through twelfth grades attend the schools of the Central Regional School District, which also serves students from the municipalities of Berkeley Township, Island Heights, Ocean Gate and Seaside Park. Schools in the district (with 2020–21 enrollment data from the National Center for Education Statistics) are Central Regional Middle School with 842 students in grades 7 and 8 and Central Regional High School with 1,568 students in grades 9–12. The high school district's board of education is comprised of nine members, who are directly elected by the residents of the constituent municipalities to three-year terms of office on a staggered basis, with three seats up for election each year. Seaside Heights is allocated one of the board's nine seats.

== Transportation ==
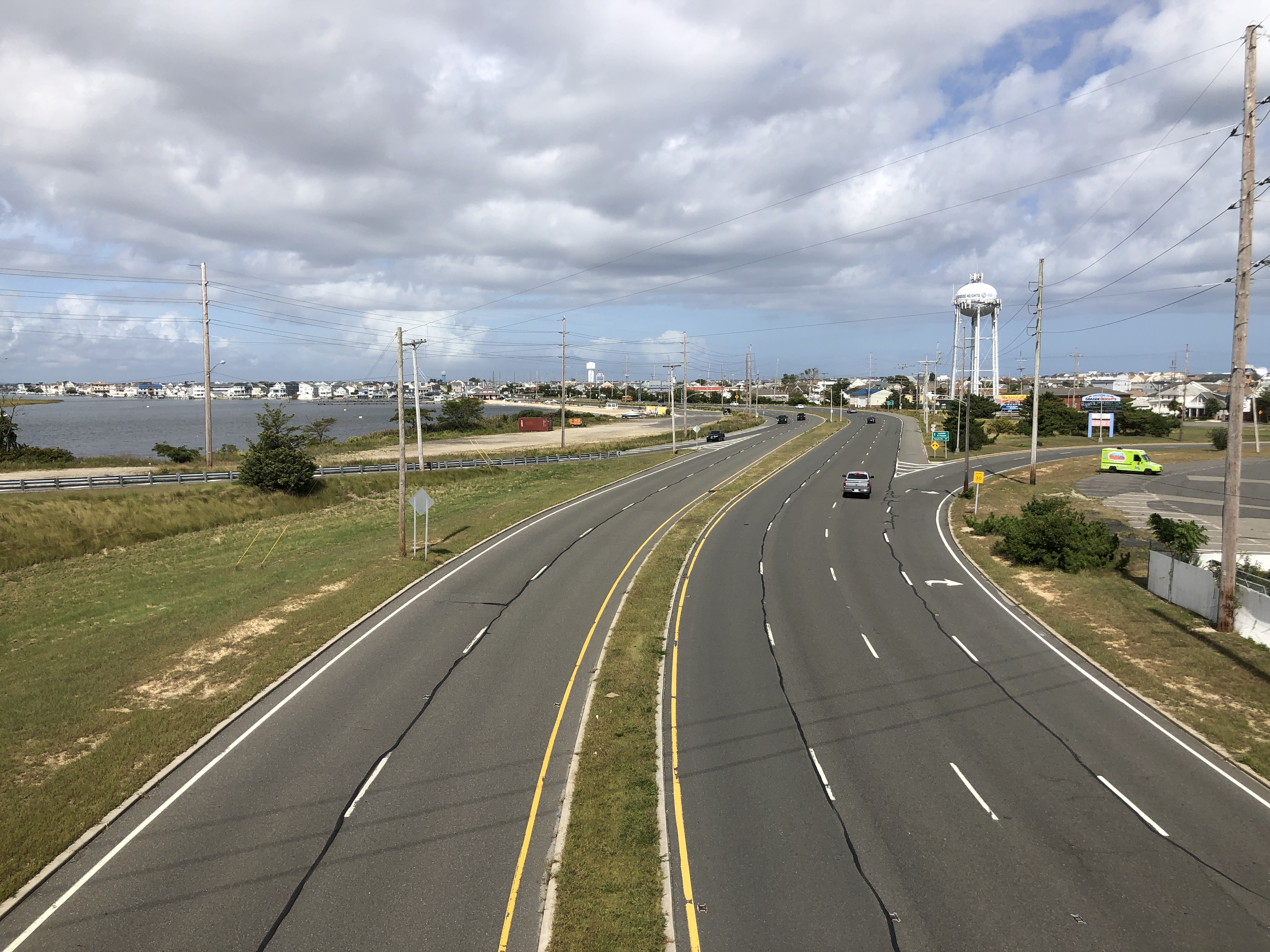
Route 35 northbound on border of Seaside Heights and Berkeley Township

=== Roads and highways ===
As of May 2010, the borough had a total of 12.52 miles (20.15 km) of roadways, of which 5.20 miles (8.37 km) were maintained by the municipality, 6.39 miles (10.28 km) by Ocean County and 0.93 miles (1.50 km) by the New Jersey Department of Transportation.

Route 35 and Route 37 both pass through Seaside Heights, intersecting at the Pelican Island approach to the Thomas A. Mathis and J. Stanley Tunney Bridges. Route 35 runs up the coast to Point Pleasant and points north and south to Seaside Park and Island Beach State Park. Route 37 crosses the Thomas A. Mathis and J. Stanley Tunney Bridges and heads west through Toms River to intersect the Garden State Parkway at exit 82.

=== Public transportation ===
NJ Transit provides seasonal bus service in Seaside Heights on the 137 route to the Port Authority Bus Terminal in New York City and to Newark Penn Station in Newark.

Ocean Ride local service is provided on the OC10 Toms River Connection route.

== Climate ==
According to the Köppen climate classification system, Seaside Heights has a humid subtropical climate (Cfa) with hot, slightly humid summers, cool winters and year-around precipitation. Cfa climates are characterized by all months having an average mean temperature above 32.0 °F (0.0 °C), at least four months with an average mean temperature at or above 50.0 °F (10.0 °C), at least one month with an average mean temperature at or above 71.6 °F (22.0 °C) and no significant precipitation difference between seasons. During the summer months in Seaside Heights, a cooling afternoon sea breeze is present on most days, but episodes of extreme heat and humidity can occur with heat index values at or above 95.0 °F (35.0 °C). During the winter months, episodes of extreme cold and wind can occur with wind chill values below 0.0 °F (−17.8 °C). The plant hardiness zone at Seaside Heights Beach is 7a with an average annual extreme minimum air temperature of 3.7 °F (−15.7 °C). The average seasonal (November–April) snowfall total is between 18 and 24 inches (46 and 61 cm) and the average snowiest month is February which corresponds with the annual peak in nor'easter activity.

Climate data for Seaside Heights Beach, NJ (1981–2010 Averages)
| Month | Jan | Feb | Mar | Apr | May | Jun | Jul | Aug | Sep | Oct | Nov | Dec | Year |
|---|---|---|---|---|---|---|---|---|---|---|---|---|---|
| Mean daily maximum °F (°C) | 40.5 (4.7) | 42.9 (6.1) | 49.6 (9.8) | 59.1 (15.1) | 68.9 (20.5) | 78.1 (25.6) | 83.4 (28.6) | 82.2 (27.9) | 76.2 (24.6) | 65.6 (18.7) | 55.4 (13.0) | 45.6 (7.6) | 62.4 (16.9) |
| Daily mean °F (°C) | 32.9 (0.5) | 34.8 (1.6) | 41.2 (5.1) | 50.5 (10.3) | 60.3 (15.7) | 69.6 (20.9) | 75.1 (23.9) | 74.0 (23.3) | 67.6 (19.8) | 56.4 (13.6) | 47.2 (8.4) | 37.7 (3.2) | 54.0 (12.2) |
| Mean daily minimum °F (°C) | 25.2 (−3.8) | 26.8 (−2.9) | 32.8 (0.4) | 41.8 (5.4) | 51.7 (10.9) | 61.2 (16.2) | 66.8 (19.3) | 65.7 (18.7) | 59.0 (15.0) | 47.2 (8.4) | 38.9 (3.8) | 29.8 (−1.2) | 45.7 (7.6) |
| Average precipitation inches (mm) | 3.66 (93) | 3.06 (78) | 4.27 (108) | 3.88 (99) | 3.54 (90) | 3.65 (93) | 4.51 (115) | 4.51 (115) | 3.53 (90) | 3.73 (95) | 3.80 (97) | 3.92 (100) | 46.06 (1,170) |
| Average relative humidity (%) | 65.2 | 63.3 | 61.3 | 62.6 | 65.8 | 70.5 | 69.6 | 71.5 | 70.6 | 69.6 | 68.1 | 66.1 | 67.0 |
| Average dew point °F (°C) | 22.5 (−5.3) | 23.6 (−4.7) | 28.9 (−1.7) | 38.2 (3.4) | 48.8 (9.3) | 59.6 (15.3) | 64.5 (18.1) | 64.2 (17.9) | 57.7 (14.3) | 46.6 (8.1) | 37.2 (2.9) | 27.4 (−2.6) | 43.4 (6.3) |
Source: PRISM

Climate data for Sandy Hook, NJ Ocean Water Temperature (36 N Seaside Heights)
| Month | Jan | Feb | Mar | Apr | May | Jun | Jul | Aug | Sep | Oct | Nov | Dec | Year |
|---|---|---|---|---|---|---|---|---|---|---|---|---|---|
| Daily mean °F (°C) | 37 (3) | 36 (2) | 40 (4) | 46 (8) | 55 (13) | 62 (17) | 69 (21) | 72 (22) | 68 (20) | 59 (15) | 51 (11) | 43 (6) | 53 (12) |
Source: NOAA

== Ecology ==
According to the A. W. Kuchler U.S. potential natural vegetation types, Seaside Heights would have a dominant vegetation type of Northern Cordgrass (73) with a dominant vegetation form of Coastal Prairie (20).

== Popular culture ==
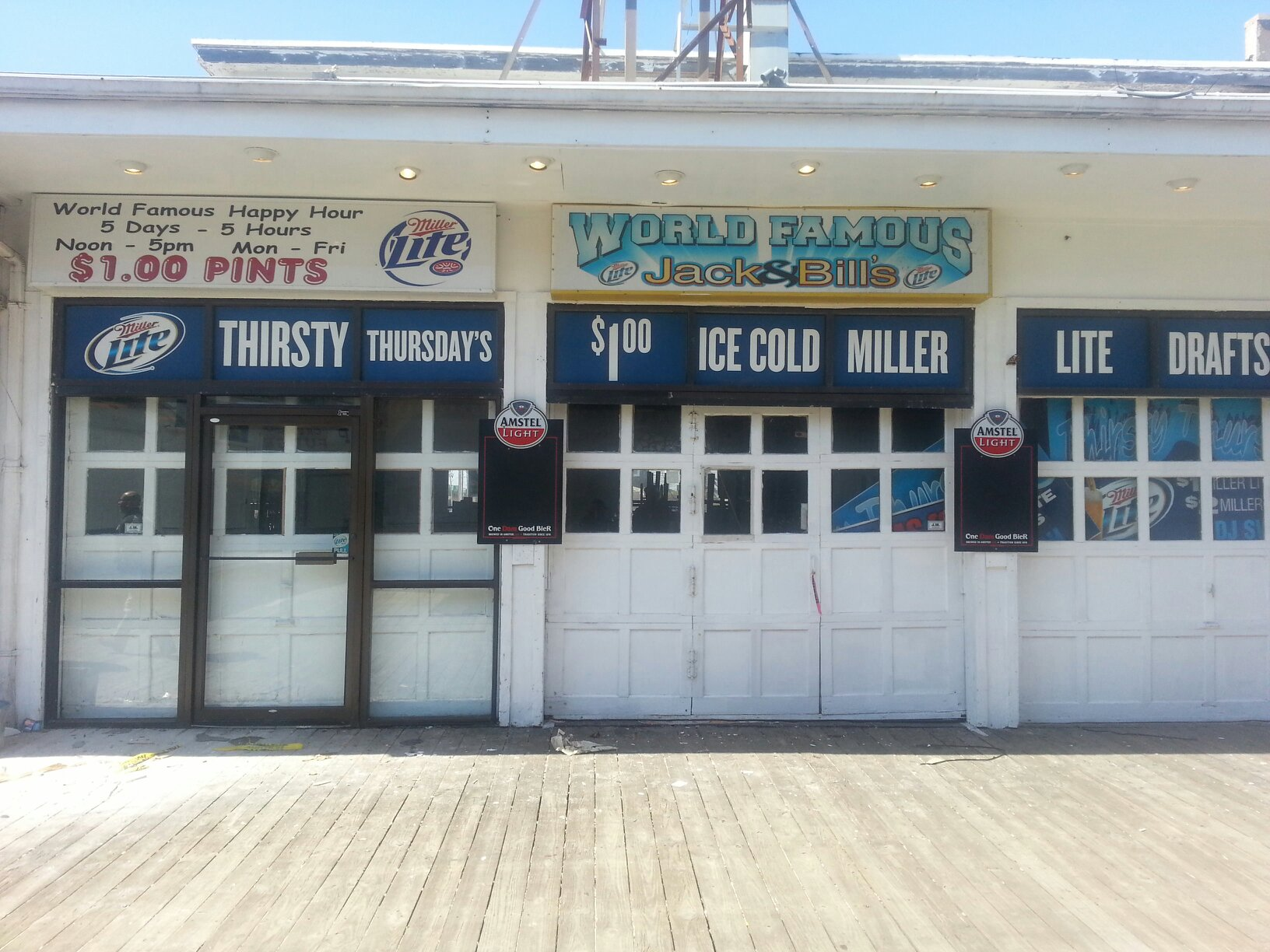
Jack & Bill's Bar, a landmark watering hole in Seaside Heights.

Seaside Heights was the setting for MTV's reality TV series Jersey Shore. The first season of Jersey Shore was filmed in Seaside Heights and Toms River during August 2009. The show's third season was also filmed in Seaside Heights, during July, August, and September 2010. After New York City officials nixed MTV's plans to hold a "Snooki Drop" at its studios in Times Square alongside the square's own ball drop, the event was moved to Seaside Heights. The show returned to Seaside Heights for its fifth season, which wrapped filming on August 2, 2011, and began airing in January 2012.

Prior to Jersey Shore, the town was also the setting of MTV's True Life: I Have A Summer Share, which was filmed in Seaside Heights, as was MTV's True Life: I'm a Jersey Shore Girl from 2004, which was one of the network's first stories of guidettes looking for the perfect guido. Additionally, MTV selected Seaside Heights as the filming location for its summer programming in both 1998 and 2002.

In 1985, New Jersey rock band Bon Jovi filmed most of their music video for the song "In and Out of Love" in Seaside Heights, mainly on the boardwalk.

Portions of the 2006 movie Artie Lange's Beer League were filmed in Seaside Heights.

The ABC soap opera One Life to Live filmed a portion of its 2008 storyline in Seaside Heights, mainly on the beach and boardwalk.

The song 'Mera Dil Tera Deewana' from the 1999 Hindi film Aa Ab Laut Chalen directed by Rishi Kapoor and starring Akshaye Khanna and Aishwarya Rai was shot at Seaside Heights.

== Notable people ==
People who were born in, residents of, or otherwise closely associated with Seaside Heights include:

- Fred Ashton (1931–2013), politician who served as the mayor of Easton, Pennsylvania, from 1968 to 1976
- Lou Taylor Pucci (born 1985), actor
- Robbie E (born 1983), professional wrestler
- Immanuel Velikovsky (1895–1979), author known for his controversial books reinterpreting the events of ancient history, in particular the bestseller Worlds in Collision

| Preceded by Ortley Beach | Beaches of New Jersey | Succeeded by Seaside Park |
