= United States v. Jackalow =

- Supreme Court of the United States

Argued March 18, 1862 Decided March 24, 1862
- Full case name: United States v. Jackalow
- Citations: 66 U.S. 484 (more) 1 Black 484; 17 L. Ed. 225; 1861 U.S. LEXIS 502

Case history
- Prior: Certificate of division from conviction in C.C.D.N.J.
- Subsequent: Nol pros motion granted

Holding
- Under the Venue and Vicinage clauses, although the description of a U.S. state boundary is a question of law for the judge, the ascertainment and application of that boundary is a question of fact for the jury.

Court membership
- Chief Justice Roger B. Taney Associate Justices James M. Wayne · John Catron; Samuel Nelson · Robert C. Grier; Nathan Clifford · Noah H. Swayne

Case opinion
- Majority: Nelson, joined by unanimous

Laws applied
- U.S. Const. art. III, § 2, cl. 3; U.S. Const. amend. VI

United States v. Jackalow, 66 U.S. (1 Black) 484 (1862), is a U.S. Supreme Court case interpreting the Venue and Vicinage clauses of the United States Constitution. It was an "unusual criminal case" and one of the few constitutional criminal cases from the Taney Court. Jackalow, a mariner from the Ryukyu Kingdom, was suspected of the robbery and murder of the captain of the sloop Spray, Jonathan Leete, and Jonathan's brother Elijah, while the ship was at sea. He was convicted of robbery in the Long Island Sound, but as there was disagreement over the question of jurisdiction between the two judges who heard the post-trial motion (Judge Mahlon Dickerson and Supreme Court Justice Robert Cooper Grier), the case was referred to the Supreme Court by certificate of division.

The Supreme Court directed the circuit court for the District of New Jersey to grant Jackalow a new trial. The Court held that while the trial court should determine the description of the boundaries of New York and Connecticut, the ascertainment of their actual boundaries, and the application of those boundaries to the crime in question, should have been a question of fact for the jury. Jackalow was not retried and was released.

The trial attracted significant media interest. According to The New York Times, "every part in and near the Court room was crowded during the trial." The case is viewed as historically significant because even though it occurred during the American Civil War, the federal courts focused on proper legal procedure and jurisprudence in a case unrelated to the war.

== Background ==
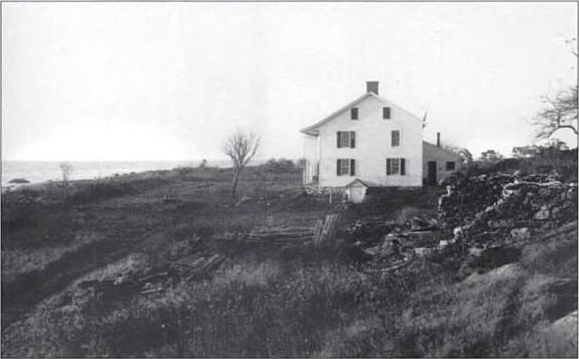
The Leete farm in Sachem's Head, which was mortgaged to purchase the Spray

Jonathan T. Leete had captained the schooner Reaper, owned by James Frisbie, and crewed by a man of East Asian origin, John Canoe, commonly known as Jackalow, short for John Low or John Lord. After Jonathan gave up command of the Reaper, he and Jackalow worked on Jonathan's father's farm on Sachem's Head in Guilford, Connecticut, where Jackalow was regarded as family. At some point, while in New York, Jackalow had stolen $100 from Jonathan and fled to New Haven. He was returned to New York by the police, but Jonathan refused to testify against him and rehired him. Jonathan and his brother Elijah J. Leete subsequently bought the 30-ton sloop Spray, funded in part by a mortgage their father took out on his farm. Jonathan (the captain), Elijah, and Jackalow sailed the Spray together for two or three years. By March 1860, Jackalow had sailed with Jonathan for four years.

== Spray's final voyage ==
On March 15, 1860, the Spray departed its home port of Guilford on a voyage to New York City, in the company of other vessels. As well as its normal crew of Jonathan, Elijah and Jackalow, there was a passenger on board: Andrew Foote, of Nut Plains. The Spray also carried hay and potatoes on consignment from David Benton of Sachem's Head.

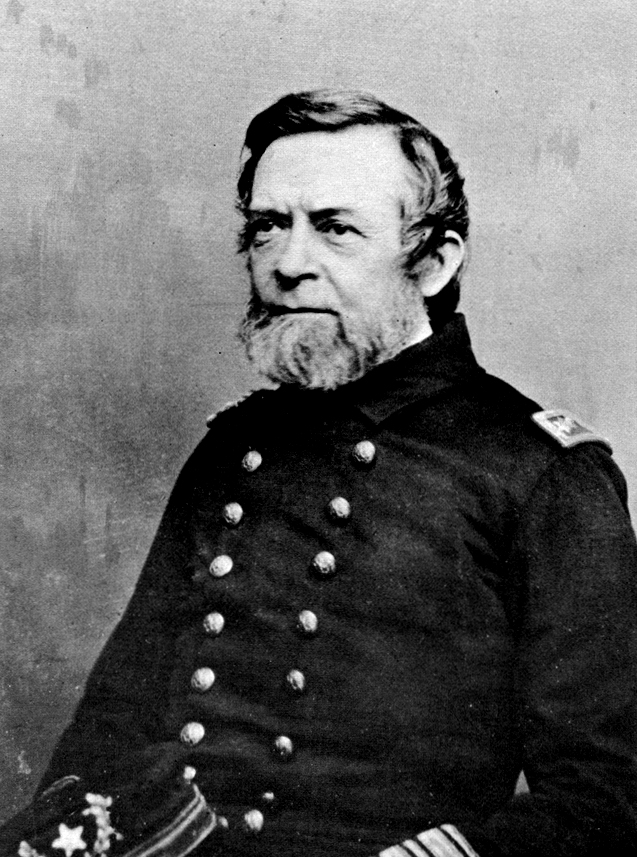
Andrew Foote, who became a rear admiral in the Civil War shortly after sailing as a passenger on the first leg of the Spray's final journey.

The Spray reached New York City safely and sold its cargo for $500 in gold and bills. (Note: According to another account, the Spray departed with the money for the purpose of purchasing oysters in Virginia.) Foote returned to Guilford by other means. The Spray set course for Guilford and was seen at various points along the route. One night, she anchored near Norwalk, where cries of "Murder!" and "Open the Cabin Door!" were allegedly heard. Supposedly, Jackalow had locked the cabin door before dispatching Elijah on the deck. Elijah had yelled "Murder!"; and Jonathan, "Open the Cabin Door!" Then, Jackalow was supposed to have shot Jonathan through the cabin skylight, thrown the bodies overboard, and searched the cabin for the money. Alone, Jackalow was further supposed to have sailed the Spray to South Brooklyn, purchased supplies, and then sailed south.

At 2 pm on Wednesday, March 21, the Spray collided with the Lucinda four miles north of Barnegat, New Jersey, knocking a hole in the Spray's bow that resulted in her filling with water; the Lucinda also sustained damage. Capt. Willis of the Lucinda saw no one other than Jackalow (whom he blamed for the collision) on board the Spray, and Jackalow refused to be rescued and taken aboard the Lucinda. Willis observed that the deck of the Spray was strewn with bedding and other articles from the cabin.

That same day, Jackalow, anchored on a nearby yawl boat and was taken aboard the schooner Thomas F. French (of Suffolk, Virginia), captained by James Webb, who believed Jackalow to be a kanaka. (Other accounts call him a lascar.) Jackalow gave contradictory accounts of the fate of the Leetes. He told Webb that Jonathan was sick in the cabin and that Elijah had been knocked overboard by the boom, but he subsequently changed his story, claiming that one brother had fallen overboard from the bowsprit, and the other had been knocked overboard by the mainsheet. Webb sailed to Little Egg Harbor, finding the Lucinda and its captain and hearing Willis's account of the collision. Webb made no attempt to detain Jackalow, who accompanied him ashore in a small row boat before immediately disappearing into a crowd.

The Spray, already stripped of her sails and rigging, and lying on her beam ends, was towed to the New York Harbor. There, the harbor police took charge of the Spray and began retrieving items from the partially submerged cabin, including the captain's bed, which was stained and splattered with blood. A "heavy three-cornered scraper" also recovered was suspected to be the "instrument with which the bloody deed was committed." A pair of unloaded pistols, one with signs of recent discharge, were also recovered. Other items included a small pine box, suspected to be the captain's money box, that had been broken open, but no bodies or money were found.

Jackalow became a wanted man, and his description was widely disseminated. On March 25, news of the fate of the Spray reached Guilford. That same day, the pilot boat George Steers reached the Spray and towed her to Jersey City.

== Jackalow's arrest ==
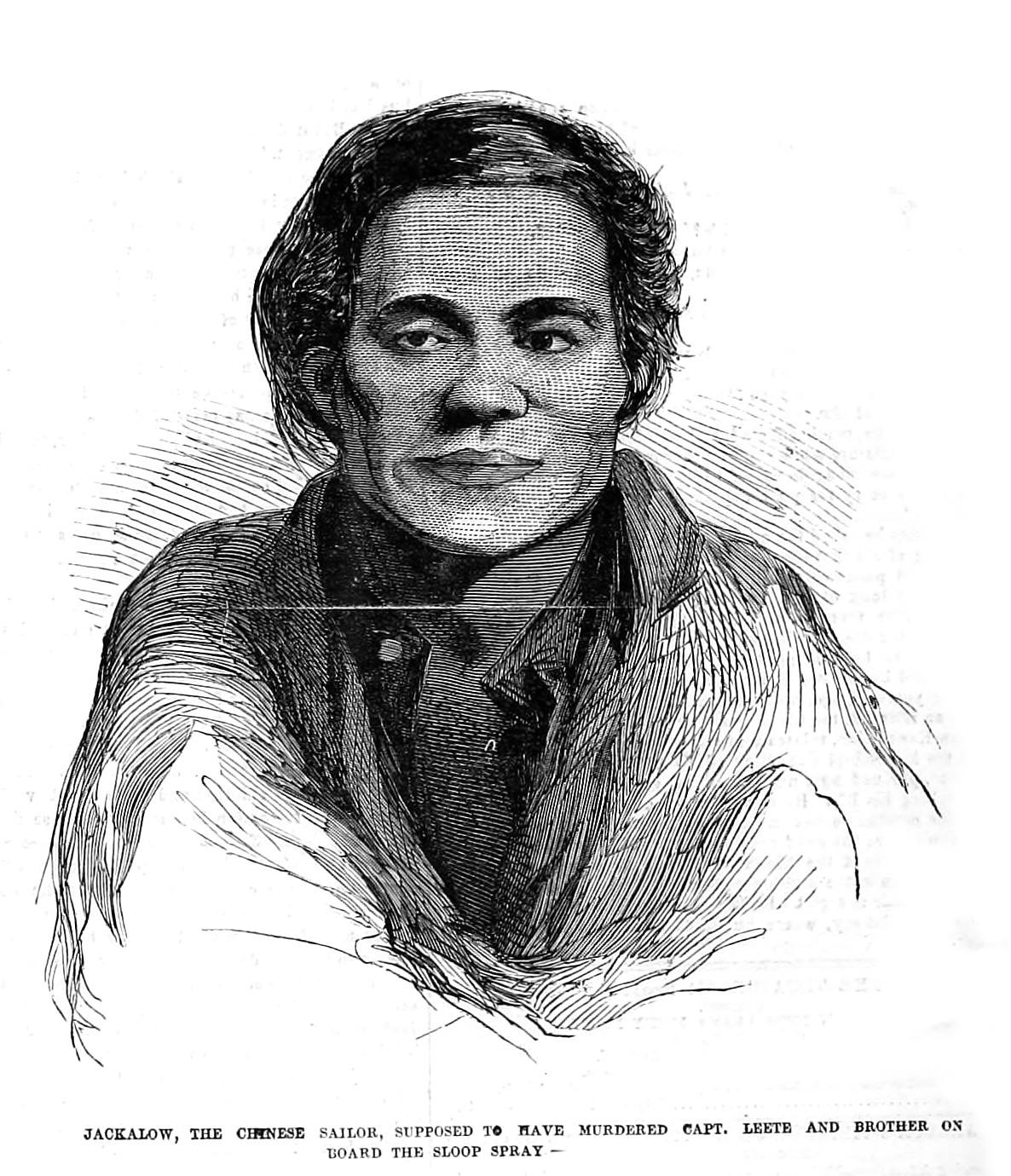
Jackalow

At 11:30 am, March 27, recognizing his description from a newspaper story, the engineer and brakeman of a train, from Philadelphia to Jersey City, crossing the Hackensack Bridge, spotted Jackalow running towards the woods. First two, then eight, New Jersey police officers went into the woods after him. Around noon, Jackalow was turned away from crossing a railroad bridge in Newark, New Jersey, by workman William Jacobus, who recognized Jackalow. His colleague Henry Wilson mentioned a $1000 reward for Jackalow's arrest, and the pair—joined by John Sanford and John Douglass, and aided by a spy glass—spotted Jackalow heading for the Newark Plank Road. Jacobus and Douglass pursued Jackalow, while Wilson and Sanford took the car to Newark, hired a horse, and set out to intercept him on the road.

The four arrested Jackalow at the toll gate of the Plank Road; he did not respond to "Jackalow" and claimed to be Indian. He was taken to Jersey City by train, arriving at about 4:00 pm. Jackalow was taken to the Jersey City police station, where in search conducted by Assistant Superintendent Woodruff bags of gold and silver worth about $400, were found tied to his person. Jackalow was also wearing Jonathan's coat, which contained Jonathan's memorandum book. (Note: Another account states that the memorandum book was found on Jackalow by Webb (and later turned over to policeman Samuel Forshay).) Jackalow was taken to the city prison. "As the news spread, people came flocking from all directions, completely filling the stationhouse and blocking the streets around it."

Soon after 5 pm, Jackalow was taken before Recorder Bedford, where Sanford lodged a formal complaint accusing Jackalow of the murders of the Leetes. Jackalow gave his name to the Recorder as "Sam Patch" and his occupation as a crewman on the Spray. Later, Jackalow told a reporter from the New York Herald that the $400 represented his savings, and that his wages had been $30/month for four years.

On Saturday, April 2, the Spray was salvaged, and the stains believed to have been blood were discovered to be vermilion. An examination by Dr. John F. Quidor found "no evidence of a murder having been committed in the cabin." In Quidor's opinion, the blood discovered on a cotton chord belonged to an animal.

=== Preliminary hearings ===
Jackalow was a native of the Ryukyu Kingdom.

Also on April 2, U.S. Commissioner J.P. Vroom, in Jersey City, presided over Jackalow's preliminary hearing. Elizabeth Schenck, an African-American, her sister Ann Louisa Talmadge, and brother-in-law James Talmadge testified that Jackalow had sought board with them, claiming to be an Indian. The court recessed until 2 pm, when Mrs. Electa Lecte and Elizabeth Leete, the mother and sister of Jonathan Leete respectively, appeared. The women identified the Leetes' effects, testified to their relationship with Jackalow, and stated that they had never known him to carry so much money. Upon seeing the women, Jackalow burst into tears and requested to speak with them. Jackalow's lawyer, William Voorhees, refused to allow Jackalow to speak to anyone without his consent.

Chas. H. Ross and Mr. Haybeck then testified to the articles he recovered from the Spray. The prosecutor, William H. Jelliffe, asked for another adjournment to await the arrival of Willis to testify to the collision. Voorhees opposed the adjournment and moved for Jackalow's immediate release on the ground that there was no jurisdiction because no crime had been proved to have been committed. Jeliffe replied that he intended to charge murder, piracy, and running away with a vessel with intent to steal it. Vroom granted an adjournment until Tuesday at 11 am. Jackalow was remanded to the city prison.

On Monday, April 4, U.S. Attorney Garret S. Cannon took over the prosecution and moved that Jackalow be transferred to the U.S. Marshall in the Essex County Jail. Voorhies again objected to jurisdiction, arguing that if the alleged murder was committed in the Long Island Sound it could only be tried in New York. Vroom on the other hand held that a showing of probable cause had been made. Further, he argued that he had jurisdiction on the grounds that the murder was committed between the state of New York and the Norwalk Islands, and Jackalow's robbery had in any case continued until his arrival in Barnegat. Jackalow was remanded to Newark to await the decision of the grand jury.

Jackalow was still incarcerated in the Essex County Jail on July 21. A reporter from the Newark Daily Advertiser visited Jackalow and found him to be intelligent, noting that he spent most of his time reading but was not proficient in spoken English. Jackalow protested his innocence to the reporter and explained that he was Japanese, from the Ryukyu Islands.

=== Indictment ===
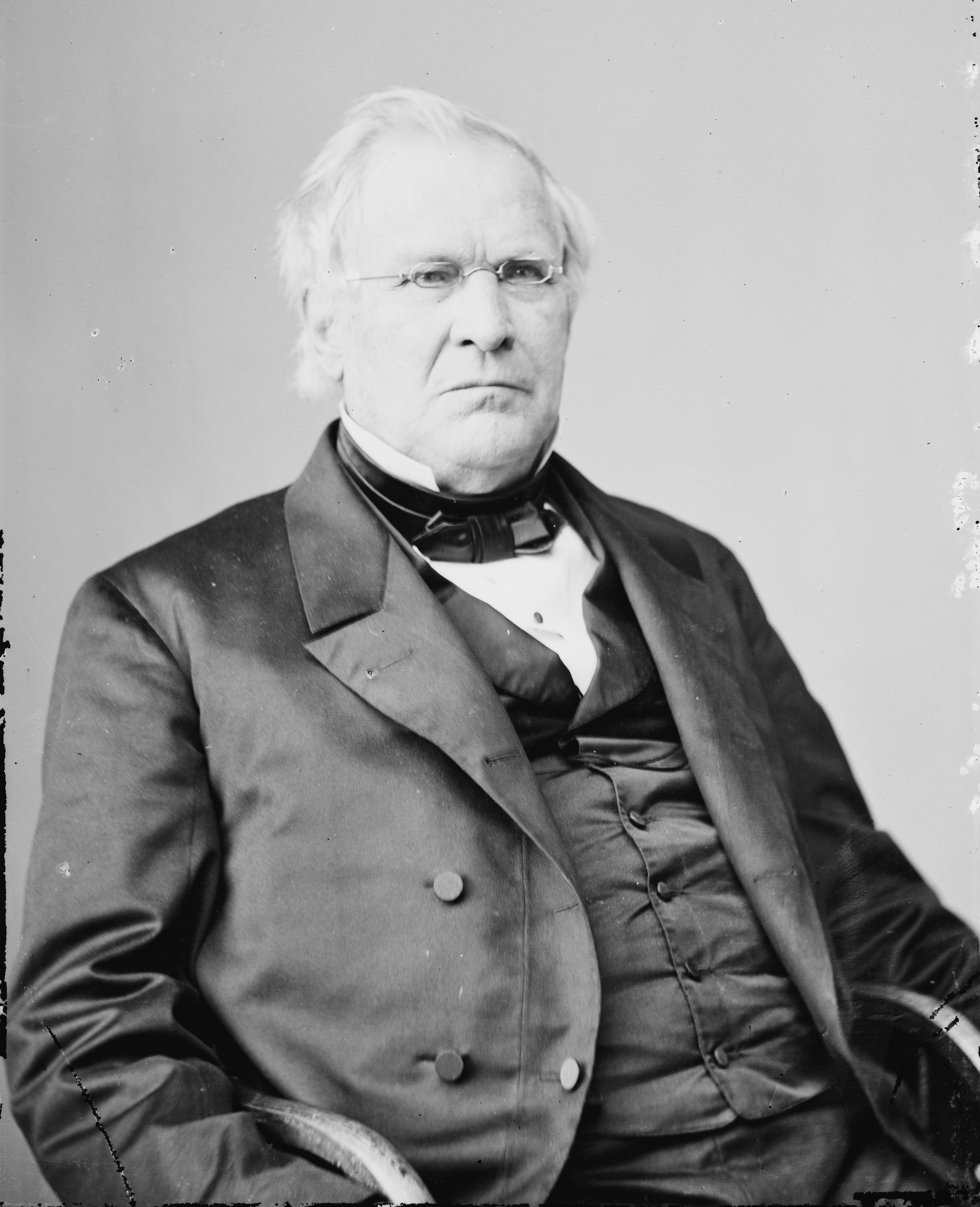
Justice Robert Cooper Grier

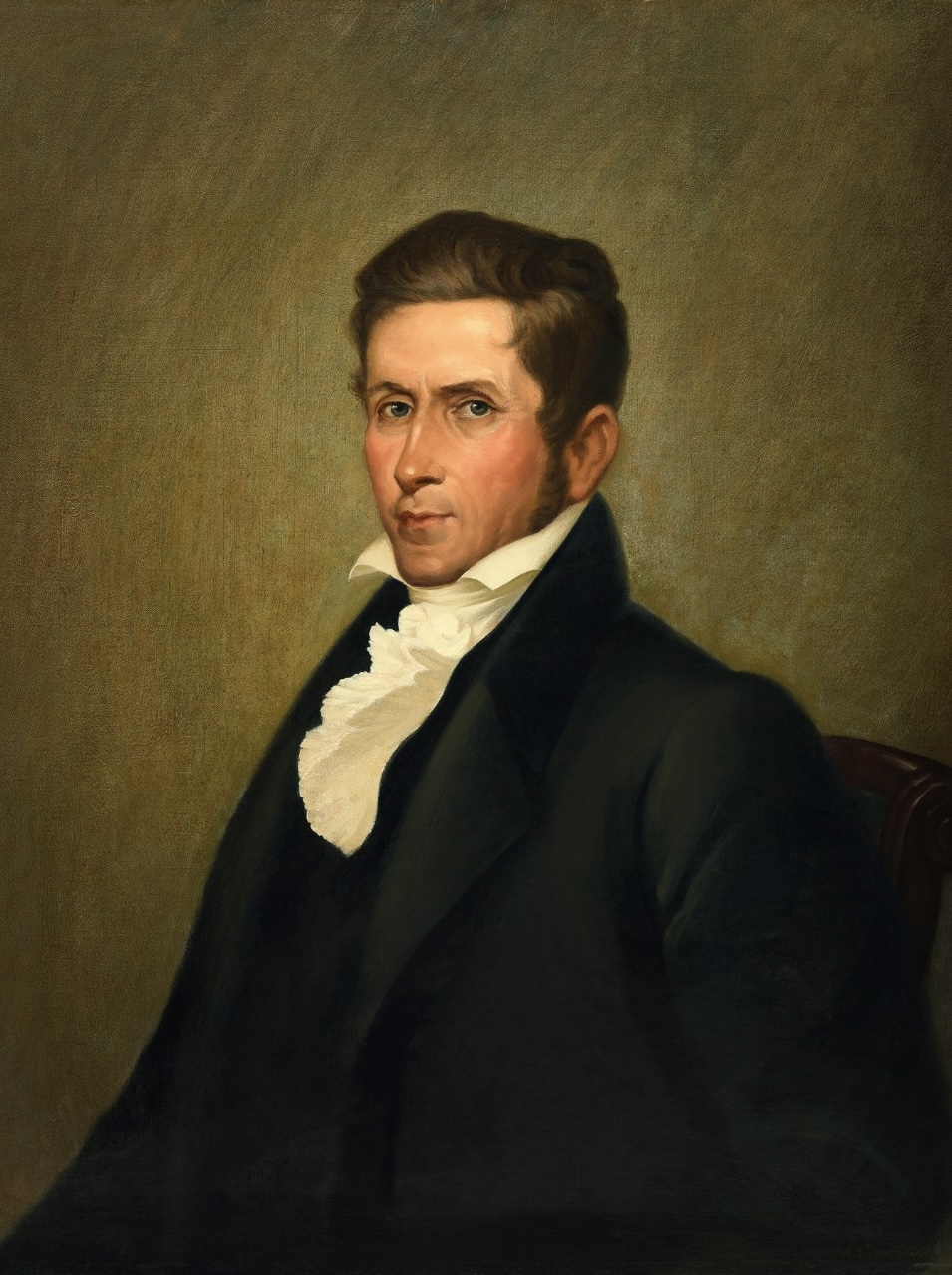
Judge Mahlon Dickerson (D.N.J.)

Jackalow's indictment, in the United States Circuit Court for the District of New Jersey, was scheduled for Tuesday, September 25. Justice Robert Cooper Grier, riding circuit, and Judge Mahlon Dickerson, of the United States District Court for the District of New Jersey, presided in Newark. Jackalow, having been moved to the Mercer jail, attended. U.S. Attorney Cannon stated that he needed three or four days to bring in witnesses from Connecticut and elsewhere. The grand jurors were sworn, and Justice Grier instructed them on the law, specifically the Act of 1820, which provided:

If any person shall, upon the high seas, or in any open roadstead, or in any haven, basin or bay, or in any river where the sea ebbs and flows, commit the crime of robbery in or upon any of the ship's company of any ship or vessel, or the lading thereof, such person shall be adjudged to be a pirate, and, being thereof convicted before any Circuit Court of the United States for the district into which he shall be brought, or in which he shall be found, shall suffer death. (Note: More specifically, Jackalow was charged under § 3 of the Act of May 15, 1820. Jackalow, 66 U.S. at 485. That statute, An Act to continue in force "An Act to protect the commerce of the United States, and to punish piracy," and also to make further provisions for punishing the crime of piracy, is found at 3 Stat., ch. 113. The New York Times quote of Justice Grier's instruction, if accurate, is a paraphrase of the statute's text.)

Justice Grier further instructed the grand jury that it was unnecessary for the government to produce the corpse to prosecute a murder. But, on September 27, while the grand jury was still sitting, Jonathan Leete's clothed body was recovered in Goose Creek, Jamaica, Queens. The body was shown to the Leetes' sister for identification, and a portion of the clothing was sent to his mother in Guilford for further identification, which was inconclusive. The forehead of the corpse bore "two distinct wounds, as if the result of blows from a hatchet or hammer." The coroner cited the wounds as the cause of death. The Leete family offered their opinion that Elijah had been at the wheel, Jackalow at the lookout, and Jonathan asleep in the berth prior to the murders. (It was the habit of the Leete brothers to sleep fully clothed.)

On Saturday, October 6, the grand jury heard testimony from Joseph Langdon, the crew of the Lucinda, and a carman from Brooklyn. At 9 am, the grand jury presented five bills of indictment against Jackalow: the murder of Jonathan Leete; the murder of Elijah Leete; the robbery of Jonathan Leete; the robbery of Elijah Leete; and running away with the Spray. Voorhees was joined by lawyer Isaac R. Wilson, of New York City, for Jackalow's defense. Jackalow pleaded not guilty to each count. On the motion of U.S. Attorney Cannon, a special term of the circuit court (Note: The provision for special terms of the circuit courts is found in § 3 of the Judiciary Act of 1793. 1 Stat. 333, 334.) was appointed to meet in Trenton, on the third Tuesday in January, to try the case.

== Trial ==
The remaining, un-impanelled petit jurors were discharged from the Trenton federal court on September 28. Thus, Jackalow could have been tried no earlier than January 1861. Jackalow's trial was scheduled for January 15, 1861.

The trial was postponed until January 17 because Jackalow's counsel was not served with the list of names of the jurors until the morning of January 15, and federal law required that the panel be served two full days before trial. (Note: The two-day notice requirement is found in § 29 of the Crimes Act of 1790. 1 Stat. 118–19.) The government planned to call 34 witnesses, and to pay each $500 for their time. Jackalow moved to compel the attendance of Dr. Theodore R. Vanck, Robert J. Dalton, and Professor George Hammell Cook of Rutgers College. Voorhees and Wilson represented Jackalow, and the prosecution was conducted by U.S. Attorney Cannon and Andrew Dutcher.

The jury was impanelled on January 18. The indictment was read and Cannon delivered his opening statement. Most of the evidence pertained to the robbery counts, resulting in speculation that the other counts would not even be tried if a robbery conviction could be obtained.

=== Prosecution's case ===
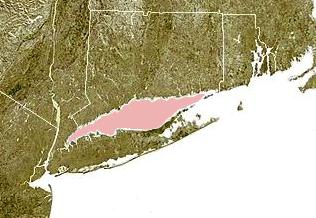
The prosecution argued that the murders occurred in the Long Island Sound.

On January 21, four government witnesses testified. The testimony tended to prove that: the Spray was seen on March 15 with Jackalow and the Leetes aboard; Jackalow was seen on the vessel alone on March 17 and 18, heading to New York City; Jackalow purchased supplies from a grocer in Brooklyn on March 19 with a roll of banknotes, including one $50 bill from the Mechanics Bank, and asked for change in coins. E. H. Grandin was added to the defense team, (Note: Under § 29 of the Crimes Act of 1790, as a capital defendant, Jackalow was entitled to two appointed counsel. 1 Stat. 118–19.) and J. W. Wiley acted as interpreter.

On January 22, eleven government witnesses testified. The testimony tended to prove that: the Spray and Lucinda had collided; Jackalow, brandishing a hatchet, had refused to allow anyone else aboard; Capt. Webb had taken Jackalow aboard his ship to Newark; Jackalow had applied for lodging in a cellar in Newark; Jackalow had given two different names for himself in Egg Harbor when relating the fate of the Leetes; he had bought supplies in New York City and Brooklyn. At the close of evidence, the government had examined 17 witnesses, half the number for which it had issued subpoenas.

On January 23, six government witnesses testified. The testimony tended to prove that: Jackalow had offered $60 for a boat, intending to catch bluefish; two witnesses had pursued Jackalow after the account of the Leetes' death was published; Jackalow was found on the Newark Plank Road; Jackalow had then claimed to be an East Indiaman named Sam Patch; the bags of coins had been found on Jackalow.

On January 24, 13 government witnesses testified. The testimony tended to prove that: Jackalow was found with $393; someone heard a "cry of murder on the Sound" on March 15; blood was found on the Spray in Jersey City. Jackalow also sought to compel the attendance of Bayard Taylor. Wiley, the interpreter, could barely understand Jackalow because his language was "not pure Chinese."

On January 25, five government witnesses testified, including Dr. Quidor and the Leetes' mother and sister. Quidor testified that he had discovered blood on a ball of twine, although it had been painted over with vermilion.

On Monday, January 28, the government examined one last witness and rested its case. The witness testified to what transpired before U.S. Commissioner Vroom after Jackalow's arrest.

=== Jackalow's case ===
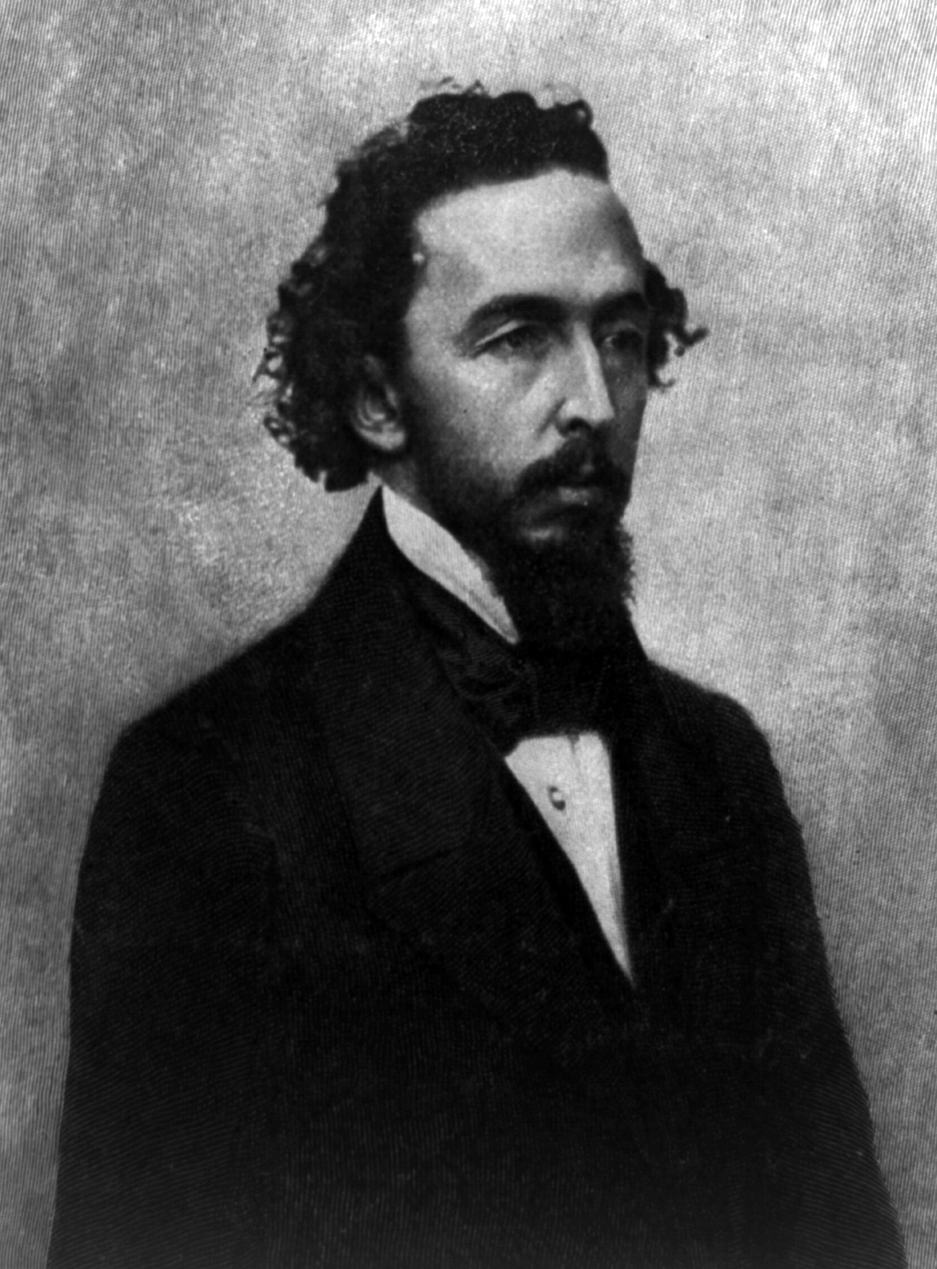
Bayard Taylor testified to having seen Jackalow in Japan.

Still on January 28, Jackalow's defense opened with Taylor's evidence. He testified to having seen a person on the Perry Expedition in Japan who "resembled [Jackalow] very much, and he thought it was the same man." Supposedly, Jackalow had been brought to the United States by Commodore Perry aboard the USS Mississippi.

At this point, Grandin moved for a judgment of acquittal for lack of jurisdiction. Because the incident took place between Norwalk and Hell Gate, Grandin argued that venue was improper in the District of New Jersey, as opposed to the Southern District of New York or District of Connecticut. Grandin also argued that the Long Island Sound was not on the "high seas" and thus that the indictment was defective. In rebuttal, Dutcher cited authorities that the Sound was "an arm of the sea." The following day, Dutcher, followed by U.S. Attorney Cannon, argued that the Sound was "uninclosed waters of the ocean outside the jaws of land." In particular, Cannon cited the Amistad case (1841) and noted that the words "out of the jurisdiction of any particular State" had been removed in 1820. Voorhees was given rebuttal.

Judge Dickerson stated that he was of the opinion that the Long Island Sound was not on the high seas. Rather than halt the trial, Dickerson proposed to have the jury return a special verdict, and, if Jackalow was convicted, to argue a motion for arrest of judgment before a "full bench" (i.e. Dickerson plus Justice Grier riding circuit) (Note: Pursuant to the proviso of § 4 of the Judiciary Act of 1802, the circuit court was composed of both a circuit rider and a stationary district judge, but either could preside alone. 2 Stat. 156, 158. Over time, it became increasingly common for a single judge or justice to preside alone. Felix Frankfurter & James McCauley Landis, The Business of the Supreme Court: A Study in the Federal Judicial System 31–32, 79–80 (1928).) at the next term in March, and, if the panel was divided, to certify the question to the Supreme Court by certificate of division.

"[W]ithout a formal opening," Voorhees called two more witnesses that day, "but nothing was elicited from them."

=== Closing arguments and instructions ===
The defense rested on January 30. Dutcher delivered the closing argument for the prosecution on the robbery charges, Grandin for the defense. On January 31, Grandin concluded his argument, and Voorhees followed; the murder charge had not been tried. Cannon delivered the prosecution's rebuttal. Cannon concluded his "most able argument" the next day, February 1.

Judge Dickerson instructed the jury to consider the two robbery charges only: "If the robbery was an after thought after the murder, it would be nothing more than larceny. If the murder was committed with the intention of taking the goods, then it was robbery." And, Dickerson instructed, "[i]f they found the prisoner guilty, then they must also fix the locality of the robbery." The jury left the courtroom at 4 pm.

=== Verdict ===
At 12 pm on February 2, the jury found Jackalow guilty on the first robbery count and not guilty on the other counts in the indictment. As for the location, the jury found that the Spray "at that time was lying on the waters adjoining the State of Connecticut, between Norwalk Harbor and Westchester county, in the State of New-York, and at a point five miles eastward from Lyon's Point, one and a half miles from the Connecticut shore at low water mark." (Note: Lyon's Point is along the boundary between New York and Connecticut. Jackalow, 66 U.S. at 485.) The special verdict did not determine whether the place of the murder was Connecticut, New York, or the high seas.

One juror explained that he considered only the taking of Leete's coat, and not their money, to have been proven. The value of the coat had been proven to be approximately $1.

Grandin moved to set aside the verdict. The question of jurisdiction was set for argument before the full bench at the upcoming March term.

=== Certificate of division ===
Jackalow's post-trial motion was argued on April 4 before Judge Dickerson and Justice Grier. Anthony Q. Keasbey, Cannon's successor as U.S. Attorney, appeared for the United States; Grandin for Jackalow. Grandin put forward various reasons to arrest the judgment:

because the Judge refused to charge the jury as to the evidence of the ownership of the gold and silver; because the Judge refused to charge the jury that the coat was taken from [Jonathan Leete] by violence ... because the first count of the indictment is uncertain and insufficient. To bring the case in this District, it should have appeared that the crime was committed out of the jurisdiction of any particular State; because it does not appear in the count that the prisoner was found and brought within the district of the State of New-Jersey; because it was not shown in the verdict that the schooner Spray was an American vessel, and was owned by citizens of the United States; because the indictment charges piracy, but in the verdict only robbery is specified, and it does not specify that it was done on the high seas; because the indictment charges that the crime was done on the water adjoining the State of Connecticut; because it does not appear that it was done within the jurisdiction of this Court.

The argument concluded on April 6. Dickerson persisted in his view that there was no jurisdiction, but Grier disagreed. The court certified the question to the Supreme Court by a certificate of division.

While the certificate was pending, a body believed to be that of Elijah Leete was discovered off the Norwalk Islands on August 21. "It had evidently been a long time in the water, and the body had on thick clothing and oil cloth pants."

== Oral argument ==
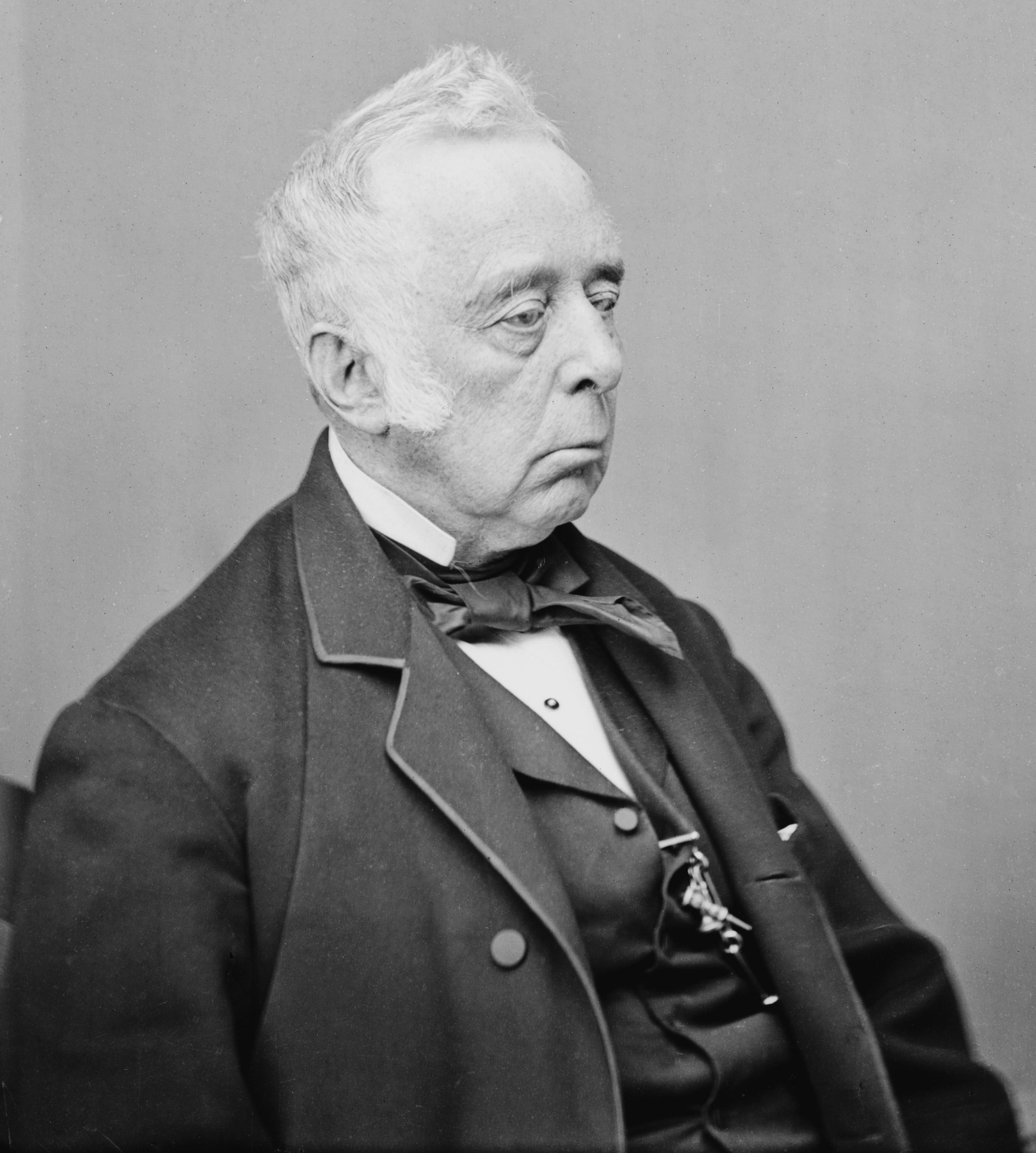
Reverdy Johnson volunteered to argue for Jackalow.

The case was called before the Supreme Court on March 17, 1862. Attorney General Edward Bates announced that he was delegating the argument to U.S. Attorney Keasbey. Jackalow's attorney was not present, and, by letter, requested a postponement. No postponement was forthcoming, and Reverdy Johnson volunteered to argue for Jackalow.

The case was argued on March 18. Keasbey made an "able and exhaustive argument" for the United States. According to The New York Times, Johnson argued for Jackalow, although the United States Reports state that "no counsel appeared for Jackalow." The opinion was to be delivered the following Monday, as the Court was to adjourn for the term on Tuesday.

== Opinion ==
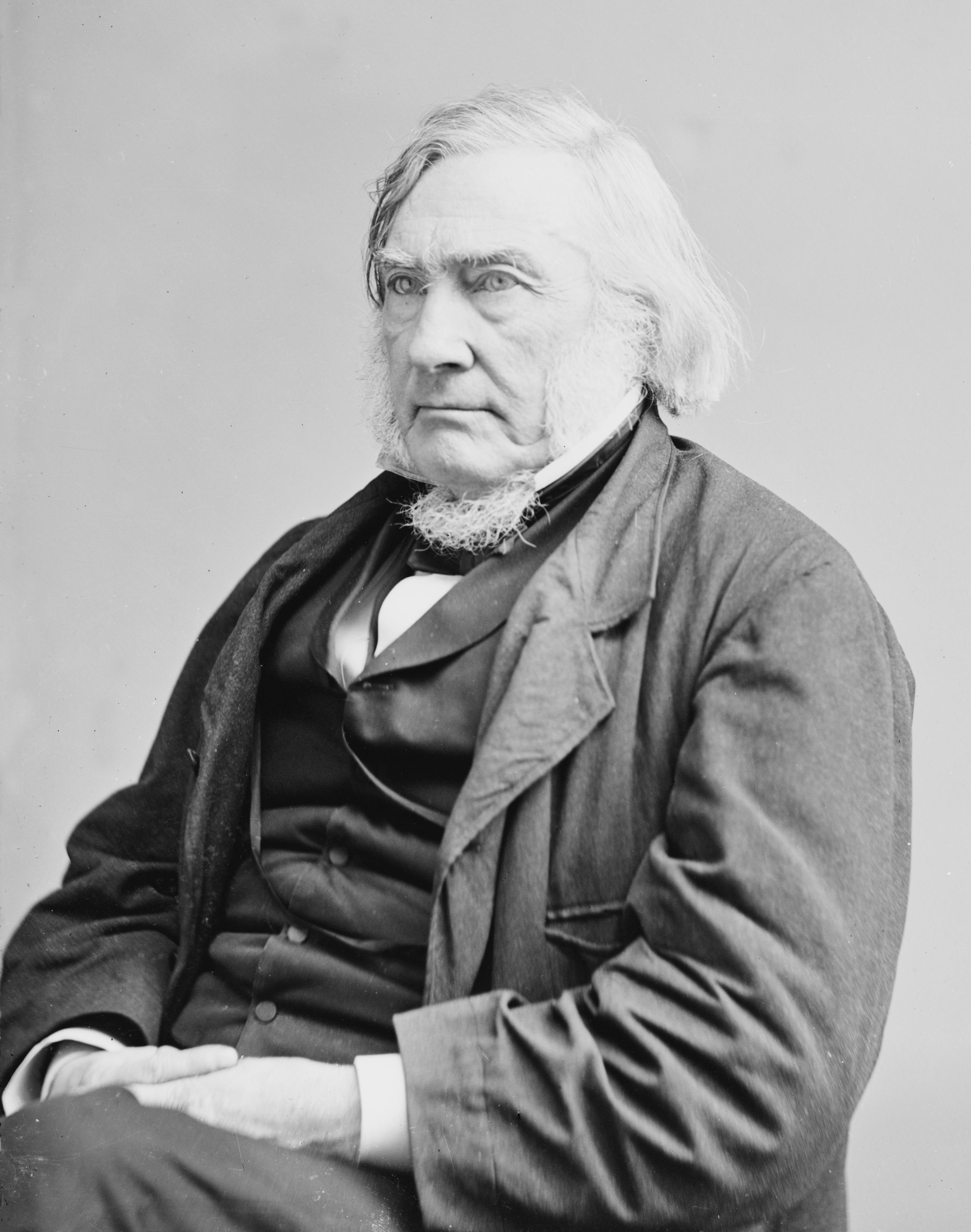
Justice Samuel Nelson delivered the unanimous opinion of the Court.

Article Three provides that "the Trial of all Crimes, except in Cases of Impeachment, shall be by Jury; and such Trial shall be held in the State where the said Crimes shall have been committed; but when not committed within any State, the Trial shall be at such Place or Places as the Congress may by Law have directed." Pursuant to the latter clause, the 1820 piracy statute provided that offenders of that statute could be tried in the "Circuit Court of the United States for the district into which he shall be brought, or in which he shall be found." Further, more generally, § 14 of the Crimes Act of 1825 provided that "the trial of all offences which shall be committed upon the high seas or elsewhere, out of the limits of any state or district, shall be in the district where the offender is apprehended, or into which he may first be brought." (Note: Section 14 of the Crimes Act of 1825 was similar in wording to the § 8 of the Crimes Act of 1790. 1 Stat. 112, 114.)

Justice Samuel Nelson, for the unanimous Court, noted that, under Article Three, the New Jersey circuit court's jurisdiction depended on two conjunctive propositions: first, that Jackalow's crime was not committed within any State; and second, that Jackalow was first apprehended in New Jersey. Citing United States v. Dawson (1854), the Court also noted that the Vicinage Clause required that crimes be tried in the district where committed, if and only if the crime was committed within a U.S. state. Further, the Court noted that, with the "high seas" crimes created by the Crimes Act of 1790 and Crimes Act of 1825, "the question presented in this case could not arise, as the offence could not be committed within the limits of the State." But, because offenses committed in "any open roadstead, or in any haven, basin, or bay, or in any river where the sea ebbs and flows" are not committed on the "high seas," the Court held, these offenses must be prosecuted in conformity with the restrictions of the venue and vicinage clauses.

The Court noted that the jury was not asked to return a special verdict that decided whether Jackalow's crime was committed within a state; instead, Judge Dickerson had himself decided that the crime was committed within New York. Although the Court expressed no opinion on the boundary of New York, it noted that "two of the eminent judges of the highest court of the State of New York entertained different opinions on this question." (Note: For this point, the Court cited Manley v. People, 7 N.Y. (3 Seld.) 295 (1852). Manley reversed a conviction for larceny committed on a steamboat within the Long Island Sound. The opinions were written seriatim. Judge Welles argued that "the state never claimed any part of the Sound except that part of it lying in Westchester county to be within her territory or to extend the jurisdiction of her courts over any other part of it" and that "Long Island Sound is by well settled rules a part of the high seas, and no one of the states bordering upon it has the right by any statute or other act of sovereignty to extend her jurisdiction over it." Id. at 300 (opinion of Welles, J.). Judge Edmonds disagreed with Welles, but supported reversing the conviction of the grounds that the offense was committed in Suffolk County, not New York County. Id. at 302–05 (opinion of Edmonds, J.). The remainder of the Court (Ruggles, Ch. J., Gardiner, Jewett and Johnson, JJ.) supported reversal on the grounds that the offense was committed in Suffolk County and that New York's statute analogous to § 14 of the Crimes Act of 1825 did not apply to the Long Island Sound. Id. at 305.) Instead, the Court prescribed the following procedure:

The boundary of a State, when a material fact in the determination of the extent of the jurisdiction of a court, is not a simple question of law. The description of a boundary may be a matter of construction, which belongs to the court; but the application of the evidence in the ascertainment of it as thus described and interpreted, with a view to its location and settlement, belongs to the jury. All the testimony bearing upon this question, whether of maps, surveys, practical location, and the like, should be submitted to them under proper instructions to find the fact.

Thus, the Court directed the circuit court to set aside the special verdict and grant a new trial.

== Aftermath ==
=== Jackalow's fate ===
At the time the Court's opinion was announced, Jackalow was in the Mount Holly Jail in Burlington County, New Jersey. The New York Times misinterpreted the Court's opinion as having "decided that the State of New-York has no jurisdiction over the waters of Long Island Sound, where the murders were committed, and has advised the United States Circuit Court for New-Jersey to proceed with the case." Thus, the Times predicted that Jackalow would be sentenced and that his counsel would attempt a motion for a new trial "upon the ground of the illegality of the verdict." Next, the Times falsely reported that Jackalow had been sentenced to death, and then that Judge Dickerson had "decided not to pass the sentence of death."

On March 24, 1863, at the Court's suggestion, the government filed a nolle prosequi motion and Jackalow was discharged. Jackalow was admonished to leave the country and never return, and he complied. Three years after Jackalow's first trial, the government was unable to locate witnesses for a retrial and persisted in "[d]oubts about the jurisdiction." Justice Grier, again riding circuit, reportedly stated: "If the Supreme Court of the United States can't make up its mind whether the place where the murder was committed was within the jurisdiction of the states or on the high seas, I am not going to come so near committing judicial murder as to set twelve men guessing at it."

That April, Voorhees filed a writ of attachment against Jackalow for unpaid attorney's fees, and the Leetes' executors were said to be contemplating similar action. The $389 that Jackalow was carrying at the time of his arrest eventually went to his lawyers.

=== As a precedent ===
The rule of Jackalow generally remains good law, but to obtain reversal of a criminal conviction for failure to submit the issue of venue to the jury, venue must have been "in issue" and the defendant must have timely objected. Lower courts differ over the precise contours of when venue is "in issue." Because the government need only prove venue by a preponderance of the evidence, and because the jury often implicitly finds facts establishing venue by convicting the defendant, such errors are often harmless.

== Analysis ==
Mark Lender cites Jackalow, decided during the American Civil War, as evidence that, "even amid the emotion of war," Judge Dickerson and Justice Grier "still preferred jurisprudence grounded in established procedures." Lender also argues that "Jackalow ... provided something of a perspective on the nature of federal jurisprudence in a time of extraordinary national crisis" by providing "generally fair and efficient proceedings" to "controversial defendants."

In part, Jackalow "attracted considerable attention" because "[w]ith the nation at war, the federal government properly was concerned with its authority at sea and the safety of American shipping, even though the case was not directly related to the rebellion."
