= George S. Duryee =

American politician

George Sharpe Duryee

U.S. Attorney for the District of New Jersey
- In office 1888–1890
- President: Grover Cleveland; Benjamin Harrison
- Preceded by: Samuel F. Bigelow
- Succeeded by: Henry S. White

New Jersey State Assembly
- In office 1877–1881

Personal details
- Born: July 15, 1850 Newark, New Jersey, US
- Died: October 28, 1896 (aged 46) Newark, New Jersey, US
- Party: Democratic
- Spouse: Virginia Teackle Beasley Duryee
- Children: 1
- Education: Rutgers, BA (1872)
- Profession: Lawyer politician

George Sharpe Duryee (July 15, 1850 – October 28, 1896) was a lawyer who served as United States Attorney for the District of New Jersey under President Cleveland. In addition he served as a member of the New Jersey State Assembly.

== Biography ==
George Sharpe Duryee was born in Newark, New Jersey, and graduated from Rutgers College in 1872 and was admitted to the New Jersey Bar in 1875. He was a prominent New Jersey lawyer for McCarter and Keene and served as a member of the New Jersey Assembly, from 1877 to 1881. In 1881 Governor Ludlow appointed him to the position of clerk at the Court of Chancery for New Jersey, a role he held until 1886. He was an alderman of Newark's fourth ward. In 1888 President Cleveland appointed him to become the United States Attorney for the District of New Jersey a role he served until his resignation in 1890. After which time he was appointed the state commissioner of insurance and banking under Governor Abbett and he was retained in that position by Governor Werts, and held this position until his death in 1896.
