= Tufo =

Tufo may refer to:

== People ==
- Gerardo Del Tufo (1909–1995), American politician
- Giovanni Battista del Tufo (1543–1622), Italian bishop
- Peter Tufo (born 1938), American diplomat
- Raymond Del Tufo Jr. (1919–1970), American lawyer and judge
- Robert Del Tufo (1933–2016), American politician

== Places ==
- Tufo, Campania, Italy

== Other ==
- Tufo (dance), traditional Mozambican dance
- Tuff, a form of rock known as tufo in Italian contexts
