= Tofu (disambiguation) =

Tofu is a food made from coagulated soy milk.

Tofu or TOFU may also refer to:

== Arts, entertainment, and media ==
- Tofu (TV series), a 2015 British online documentary
- Tofu Records, a former American record label for Japanese artists
- The Tofus, an animated series about an environmentally conscious family
- To-Fu: The Trials of Chi, a video game

== Computing and technology ==
- TOFU, or trust on first use, a security model associated with encrypted communication protocols
- Tofu (symbol), slang for a small rectangle used to represent a codepoint that cannot be resolved from any of the installed fonts
  - .notdef, a character within a font used for this purpose
- Tofu, Internet slang for top-posting in e-mail and in Web forums
- Tofu, short for Torus fusion, a supercomputer network topology

== See also ==
- Tufo (disambiguation)
- Du Fu, a Chinese poet
- Toffee
