= Henry S. White =

American lawyer and judge (1844-1901)

Henry Simmons White
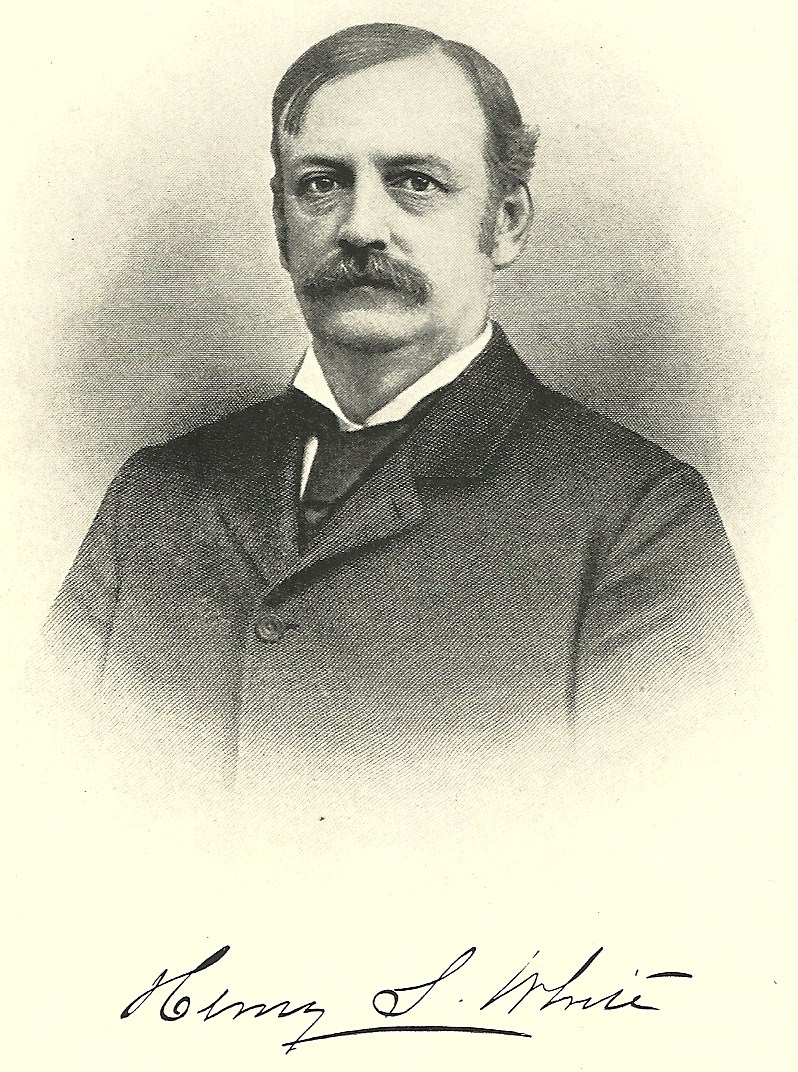

U.S. Attorney for the District of New Jersey
- In office 1890–1894
- President: Benjamin Harrison; Grover Cleveland
- Preceded by: George S. Duryee
- Succeeded by: John W. Beekman

Personal details
- Born: July 13, 1844 Red Bank, New Jersey
- Died: September 29, 1901 (aged 57) Red Bank, New Jersey
- Spouse: Annie Hull McLean White (married 1878; died 1937)
- Children: Margaretta Pennington White Harrison
- Education: College of Physicians and Surgeons of New York (MD) (1864); Columbia College (JD) (1870)
- Profession: Lawyer; surgeon; soldier; doctor

Military service
- Allegiance: United States
- Branch/service: United States Army
- Years of service: 1864-1865
- Rank: Surgeon

Henry Simmons White (July 13, 1844 – September 29, 1901) was a lawyer who served as United States Attorney for the District of New Jersey under two presidents. In addition he was a surgeon for the union army during the civil war as a teenager.

== Family history ==
White was born in Red Bank, New Jersey on July 13, 1844, to Isaac P. and Adaline (Simmons) White. His grandfather, Esek White acquired an education in New York City where he engaged in business, in addition to running a home farm in Monmouth county. Politically, he was a staunch Whig, while religiously he was a Quaker. He married Ann Bessonet, of a prominent French family, and through this marriage four children were born including Isaac P. White (Henry's father), born in Shrewsbury township, Monmouth County, on April 7, 1804. Issac early in his life was employed as a store clerk in Shrewsbury and subsequently moved to Brooklyn, where he became one of the organizers of Lippincott & White, a wholesale grocery business. On withdrawing from that enterprise, he became a member of Wooley & White, lumber dealers of Red Bank, establishing the first lumber yard in that portion of New Jersey. The enterprise proved profitable from the beginning and they built up a large business. In 1873, White moved to Jersey City, where he retired until his 1876 death. His early political support was of a Whig (like his father), but later in life he joined the Republican party, for which he was an advocate. He was reared in the faith of the Society of Friends a Quaker group, but as his wife was a Presbyterian he attended that church. He was an ensign or third lieutenant in the New York militia for years. Fraternally he was connected with the Independent Order of Odd Fellows, as one of its valued members. His wife, Adaline Simmons, was a daughter of Abraham Simmons and was born at Phelps, Ontario County, New York, August 26, 1817, her death occurring at Red Bank, May 7, 1884. They had three children including Henry.

== Education and military service ==
White acquired his preliminary education in public schools, and through private tutors at home. He graduated the College of Physicians and Surgeons of New York City in 1864, but could not receive his diploma, because he had not yet reached the required age of 21. After his graduation he was appointed assistant surgeon in the United States army during the last two years of the Civil war. He returned to the north post war where he spent time in New York City hospitals. In the spring of 1866 he obtained his degree of Doctor of Medicine. He immediately began practicing medicine, and would continue to do so for about two years more. In 1868 he returned to New York and entered the law department of Columbia College, because he decided that the field of jurisprudence would offer him greater opportunities and that the profession would be more congenial than that of medicine. He had previously read law in the office of William Allen Lewis, of Jersey City, and in 1870 he graduated from Columbia and was admitted to the New York bar, and in 1872 he was admitted to the New Jersey bar. He was made a counselor at law in November 1875.

== Legal career ==
On February 1, 1873, White began a partnership with John Blair when they opened an office in Jersey City. The firm would last until 1878, when they dissolved the partnership, due to Blair's appointment as a member of the state judiciary. White then engaged in a solo practice and gained a vast clientele. Between 1884 and 1890 he operated an additional office in New York City. In 1890, White was appointed by the president the United States attorney for the district of New Jersey, a position he held for four years.

== Personal life ==
=== Family ===
In 1878 Henry married Annie H. McLean, the daughter Judge A. C. McLean, of Freehold. Together the couple had one daughter. Mrs. White was known to be a big part of the New Jersey Historical Society. Henry and his wife were prominently connected with the Presbyterian Church of Red Bank (the same one to which his parents went).

=== Clubs ===
Socially, White was connected with the Masonic lodge of Red Bank and was a prominent representative of Arrowsmith Post, No. 61, G. A. R., of which he served as commander and was commander of the department of New Jersey in 1895 and 1896.
