= Benjamin Franklin Howey =

American politician

Benjamin F. Hosey
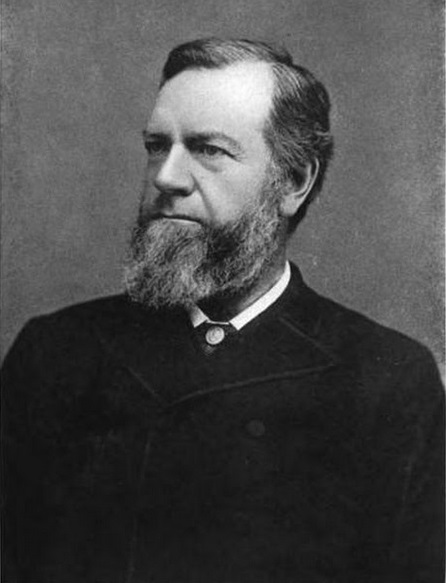

Member of the U.S. House of Representatives from New Jersey's 4th district
- In office March 4, 1883 – March 3, 1885
- Preceded by: Henry S. Harris
- Succeeded by: James N. Pidcock

Sheriff of Warren County, New Jersey
- In office November 13, 1878 – November 15, 1881

Personal details
- Born: Benjamin Franklin Howey; March 17, 1828 Pleasant Meadows, New Jersey
- Died: February 6, 1893 (aged 64) Columbia, New Jersey, USA
- Resting place: Trinity Church Cemetery, Swedesboro
- Party: Republican
- Profession: Politician, Lawyer

Military service
- Allegiance: United States
- Branch/service: Union Army
- Years of service: 1862-1863
- Rank: Captain
- Battles/wars: American Civil War

Benjamin Franklin Howey (March 17, 1828 – February 6, 1893) was an American lawyer and Republican politician who represented New Jersey's 4th congressional district in the United States House of Representatives for one term from 1883 to 1885.

== Early life and career ==
Howey was born in Pleasant Meadows, near Swedesboro, Gloucester County, New Jersey.

He engaged in business in Philadelphia, Pennsylvania as a flour and grain commission merchant in 1847 and later in quarrying and manufacturing slate.

=== Civil War ===
He served as captain of Company G, Thirty-first Regiment, New Jersey Volunteers, from September 3, 1862, to June 26, 1863.

He later served as sheriff of Warren County, New Jersey, from November 13, 1878, to November 15, 1881.

== Congress ==
Howey was elected as a Republican to the Forty-eighth Congress, serving in office from March 4, 1883 – March 3, 1885.

In 1886, Howey would become the Republican candidate for the 1886 New Jersey gubernatorial election, but lose to Robert S. Green.

== Death ==
He died in Columbia, New Jersey, and is interred in Trinity Church Cemetery in Swedesboro.

== Electoral history ==
=== New Jersey Governor ===
New Jersey gubernatorial election, 1886
Party	Candidate	Votes	%	±%
Democratic	Robert Stockton Green	109,939	47.44%	▼2.49
Republican	Benjamin Franklin Howey	101,919	43.98%	▼2.67
Prohibition	Clinton B. Fisk	19,808	8.55%	▲6.55
Majority				
Total votes		231,666	100.00%	
Democratic hold		Swing		

U.S. House of Representatives
Preceded by Henry S. Harris	Member of the U.S. House of Representatives from New Jersey's 4th congressional district March 4, 1883–March 3, 1885	Succeeded by James N. Pidcock
Party political offices
Preceded by Jonathan Dixon	Republican Nominee for Governor of New Jersey; 1886	Succeeded by Edward Burd Grubb Jr.
