= Philip R. Sellinger =

American lawyer (born 1954)

Philip Sellinger
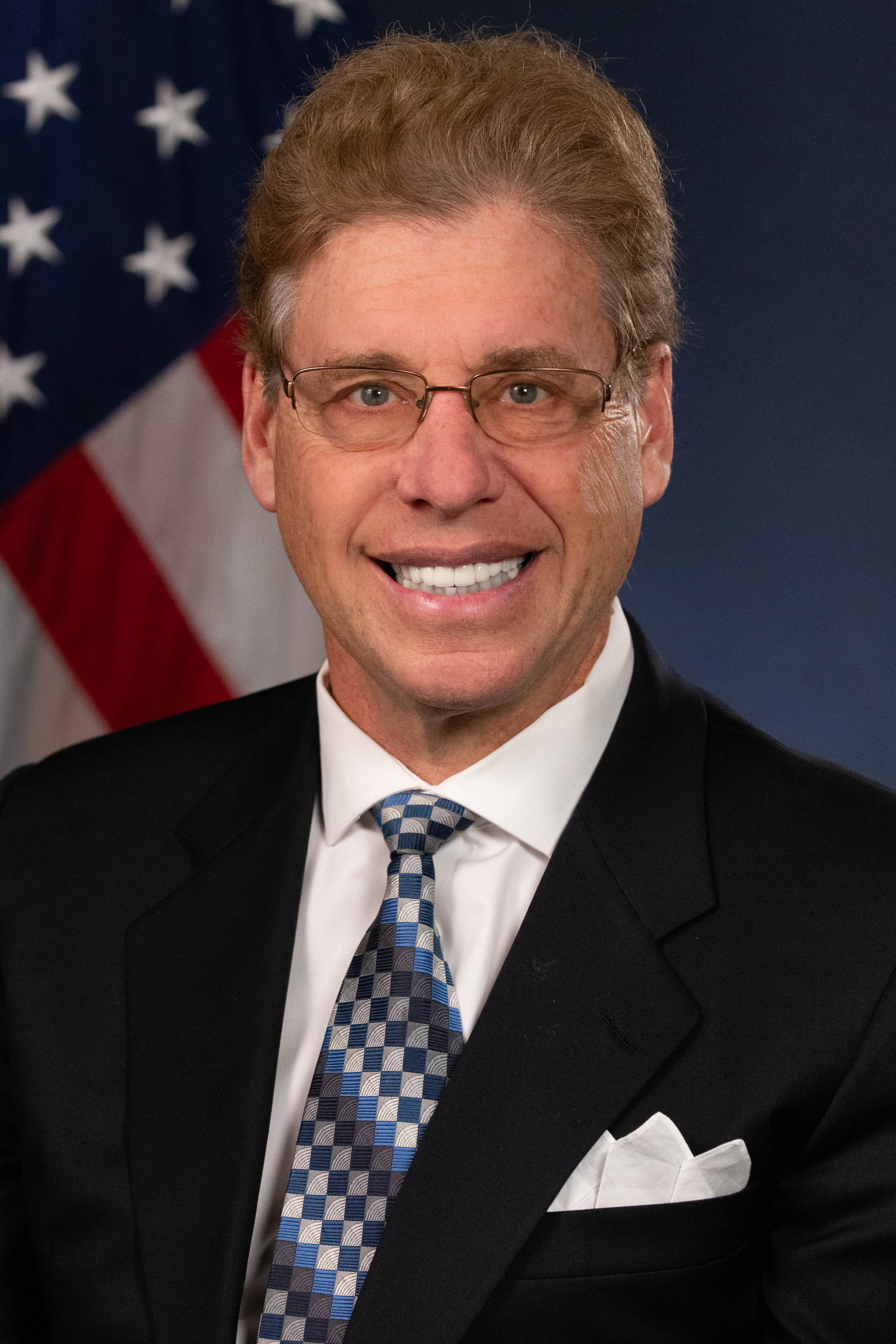
- Official portrait, 2022

United States Attorney for the District of New Jersey
- In office December 16, 2021 – January 8, 2025
- President: Joe Biden
- Preceded by: Craig Carpenito; Rachael A. Honig (acting)
- Succeeded by: Vikas Khanna (acting); John Giordano (interim); Alina Habba (interim)

Personal details
- Born: Philip Rabner Sellinger; 1954 (age 71–72) Boston, Massachusetts, U.S.
- Party: Democratic
- Education: University of Massachusetts Amherst (BA); New York University (JD)

Philip Rabner Sellinger (born 1954) is an American lawyer who served as the United States attorney for the District of New Jersey from 2021 to 2025.

== Early life and education ==
Sellinger was born in Boston. He earned a Bachelor of Arts degree from the University of Massachusetts Amherst in 1976 and a Juris Doctor from the New York University School of Law in 1979.

== Career ==
In 1979 and 1980, Sellinger served as a law clerk for Judge Anne Elise Thompson. From 1981 to 1984, he served as an Assistant United States Attorney in the United States Attorney's Office for the District of New Jersey. From 1984 to 2002, he worked at Sills Cummis & Gross. In 2002, he became a co-managing partner of Greenberg Traurig. Sellinger has been a member of the New Jersey Democratic State Committee for Morris County. Sellinger has also been a political fundraiser for several New Jersey Democratic politicians, including Bob Menendez and Cory Booker.

=== U.S. attorney for the District of New Jersey ===
On October 27, 2021, President Joe Biden announced Sellinger as a nominee to be the United States attorney for the District of New Jersey. On December 2, 2021, his nomination was reported out of committee by a voice vote. On December 7, 2021, his nomination was confirmed in the United States Senate. He was sworn into office on December 16, 2021. He announced his resignation from office on December 23, 2024, effective January 8, 2025.

== Personal life ==
Sellinger and his wife, Barbara, reside in Morris Township, New Jersey, in a mansion named Sunnymede.

Legal offices
Preceded by Craig Carpenito	United States Attorney for the District of New Jersey; 2021–2024	Succeeded by Vikas Khanna; Acting
