= Elie Honig =

American attorney (born 1975)

- Born: April 3, 1975 (age 51); Camden, New Jersey, U.S.
- Education: Rutgers University, New Brunswick (BA); Harvard University (JD)
- Spouse: Rachael A. Honig
- Children: 2

Elie Honig (born April 3, 1975) is an American attorney and legal commentator. He is the senior legal analyst for CNN. Prior to working for CNN, Honig was an assistant United States Attorney. He also served as Director of the New Jersey Division of Criminal Justice.

== Early life ==
Honig was born in Camden, New Jersey, on April 3, 1975 and grew up in Voorhees Township and Cherry Hill. Voorhees is adjacent to Cherry Hill. He is Jewish and had a bar mitzvah ceremony. Two of his grandparents survived the Nazi concentration camps during the Holocaust.

Honig graduated from Cherry Hill High School East, a public high school in Cherry Hill in 1993. He earned his bachelor's degree from Rutgers University in 1997 and his Juris Doctor from Harvard Law School in 2000.

== Career ==
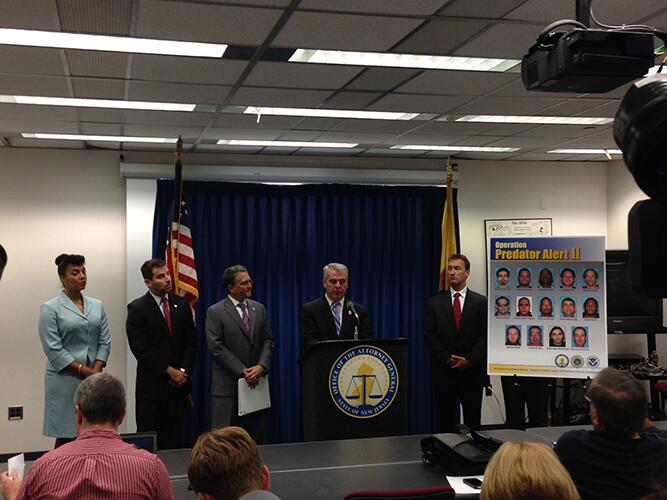
Honig (second from left) during a press conference in October 2013

After graduating, Honig took a job with Covington & Burling in Washington, D.C. From 2004 to 2012, Honig was an assistant United States attorney in the Southern District of New York. He prosecuted organized crime. In 2010, he became the deputy chief of the Organized Crime Unit. He secured convictions against 100 members of the American mafia, including members of the Genovese and Gambino crime families such as Ciro Perrone, Matthew Ianniello, Angelo Prisco, Daniel Marino, and Joseph Corozzo.

In September 2012, Honig joined the Attorney General of New Jersey's office as the deputy director of the Division of Criminal Justice. He was named director of the division in February 2013. He led the division's bail reform initiative in 2017.

In May 2018, Rutgers University established the Institute for Secure Communities and named Honig as its executive director. He presently serves in that role, while also teaching several courses at Rutgers University, including one at the Eagleton Institute of Politics about federal prosecution.

Honig joined Lowenstein Sandler in June 2018. In September 2018, he became a senior legal analyst for CNN. Honig's first book, Hatchet Man: How Bill Barr Broke the Prosecutor's Code and Corrupted the Justice Department, was published in 2021. His second book, Untouchable: How Powerful People Get Away with It, shipped in late-January 2023. His most recent book, When You Come at the King: Inside DOJ’s Pursuit of the President, from Nixon to Trump, was published in September 2025.

Since 2024, Honig has written a weekly column for New York. He has also produced a podcast, "Up Against the Mob", and a documentary for CNN on the trial of Adolf Eichmann, in which he interviewed the trial's prosecutor, Gabriel Bach. In 2025, he interviewed a Holocaust survivor who shares his exact birth name, Eliezer Honig, in an International Holocaust Remembrance Day documentary short on The Situation Room. In a 2026 Anderson Cooper 360° video interview, he spoke with Melba Pattillo Beals, a member of the Little Rock Nine, regarding the Trump administration's potential use of the Insurrection Act of 1807.

== Personal life ==
Honig's wife, Rachael, is also an attorney. She served as Acting United States Attorney for the District of New Jersey from January 6, 2021, to December 15, 2021. They have two children and live in Metuchen, New Jersey which is near Rutgers University.

== Bibliography ==
- Honig, Elie (2021). Hatchet Man: How Bill Barr Broke the Prosecutor's Code and Corrupted the Justice Department. HarperCollins. ISBN 9780063092372.
- Honig, Elie (2023). Untouchable: How Powerful People Get Away with It. HarperCollins. ISBN 9780063241626.
- Honig, Elie (2025). When You Come at the King: Inside DOJ's Pursuit of the President, from Nixon to Trump. HarperCollins. ISBN 9780063447363.

== Awards and nominations ==
Year	Award	Category	Work	Result	Ref.
2021	Mediaite Most Influential People in News Media	Media influence	Legal analysis on CNN and commentary on legal and political developments	Ranked 54th	
2022	Mediaite Most Influential People in News Media	Media influence	Legal analysis on CNN and commentary on legal and political developments	Ranked 58th	
2022	News & Documentary Emmy Awards	Outstanding News Analysis: Editorial & Opinion	CNN documentary on the Adolf Eichmann trial	Nominated	
2023	Mediaite Most Influential People in News Media	Media influence	Legal analysis on CNN and commentary on legal and political developments	Ranked 39th	
2024	Mediaite Most Influential People in News Media	Media influence	Legal analysis on CNN and commentary on legal and political developments	Ranked 55th	
2025	Mediaite Most Influential People in News Media	Media influence	Legal analysis on CNN and commentary on legal and political developments	Ranked 47th	
