= Robert S. Green =

American politician (1831-1895)

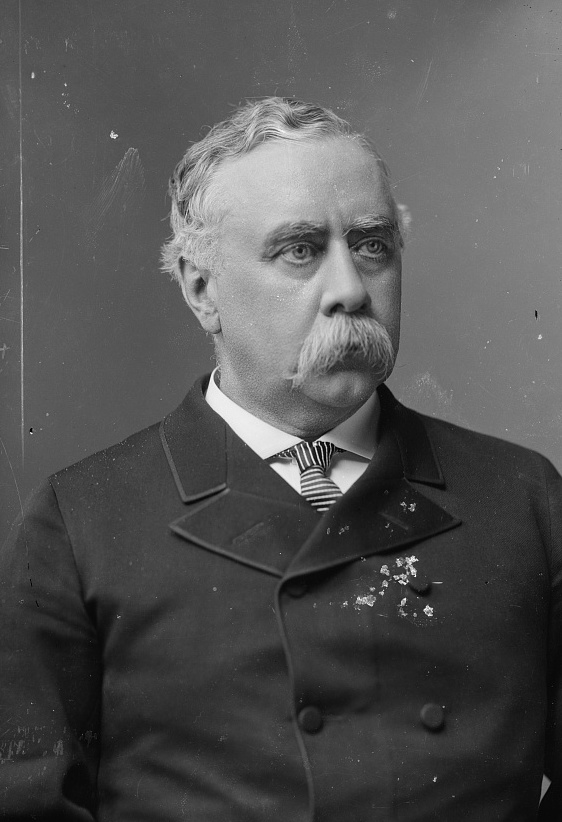

Judge of the New Jersey Court of Errors and Appeals
- In office 1894 – May 7, 1895

Vice-Chancellor of the New Jersey Chancery Court
- In office 1890–1895

27th Governor of New Jersey
- In office January 18, 1887 – January 21, 1890
- Preceded by: Leon Abbett
- Succeeded by: Leon Abbett

Member of the U.S. House of Representatives from New Jersey's 3rd district
- In office March 4, 1885 – January 17, 1887
- Preceded by: John Kean
- Succeeded by: John Kean

Presiding Judge of the Union County Court of Common Pleas
- In office 1868–1873

Member of Elizabeth City council
- In office 1863–1873

Surrogate of Union County
- In office 1862–1867

Elizabeth City Attorney
- In office 1857–1868

Prosecuting Attorney of Union County
- In office 1857

Personal details
- Born: Robert Stockton Green; March 25, 1831 Princeton, New Jersey, U.S.
- Died: May 7, 1895 (aged 64) Elizabeth, New Jersey, U.S.
- Resting place: Green-Wood Cemetery, Brooklyn, New York City, New York, U.S.
- Party: Democratic
- Spouse: Mary E. Mulligan (m. 1857)
- Children: 4
- Parent: James S. Green (father)
- Education: College of New Jersey

Robert Stockton Green (March 25, 1831 – May 7, 1895) was an American Democratic Party politician, who was the 27th governor of New Jersey from 1887 to 1890. He also sat for one term in the United States House of Representatives from 1885 to 1887.

== Early life and education ==
Green was born in Princeton, New Jersey, the son of James S. Green and the former Isabella Williamson McCulloh. His father was U.S. Attorney for the District of New Jersey from 1835 to 1850. He graduated from the College of New Jersey (now Princeton University) in 1850. He studied law, was admitted to the bar in 1853 and commenced practice in Elizabeth, New Jersey.

On October 1, 1857, he married the former Mary E. Mulligan. They had four children: Caroline, Catherine, Isabelle and Robert Stockton Green Jr.

== Political career ==
He was a member of the Elizabeth city council from 1863 to 1873, and was presiding judge of the Union County Court of Common Pleas from 1868 to 1873.

=== Congress and governor ===
He was a U.S. representative in the Forty-ninth United States Congress from March 4, 1885, until his resignation on January 17, 1887, when he stepped down to become Governor of New Jersey from 1887 to 1889.

=== Judge ===
Green was a delegate to the Democratic National Conventions in 1860, 1880 and 1888.

He was a judge on the New Jersey Court of Errors and Appeals, then the state's highest court, in 1894 and 1895.

== Death ==
He died in Elizabeth on May 7, 1895. He was buried in Green-Wood Cemetery in Brooklyn, New York City.

U.S. House of Representatives
Preceded by John Kean	Member of the U.S. House of Representatives from New Jersey's 3rd congressional district March 4, 1885 – January 17, 1887	Succeeded by John Kean
Political offices
Preceded by Leon Abbett	Governor of New Jersey; January 18, 1887 – January 21, 1890	Succeeded by Leon Abbett
Party political offices
Preceded by Leon Abbett	Democratic Nominee for Governor of New Jersey; 1886	Succeeded by Leon Abbett
