= Rachael A. Honig =

American legal scholar

Rachael Honig
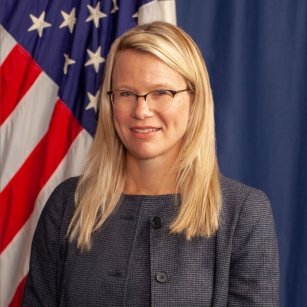
- Official portrait, 2021

United States Attorney for the District of New Jersey
- Acting
- In office January 6, 2021 – December 16, 2021
- President: Donald Trump; Joe Biden
- Preceded by: Craig Carpenito
- Succeeded by: Philip R. Sellinger

Personal details
- Spouse: Elie Honig
- Children: 2
- Education: University of Chicago (BA, JD)

Rachael A. Honig is an American lawyer who served as the acting United States Attorney for the District of New Jersey in 2021.

== Education and career ==
Honig earned a Bachelor of Arts degree in English language and literature from the University of Chicago in 1995 and a J.D. degree from the University of Chicago Law School in 1999. She was a comment editor for the University of Chicago Law Review.

== Career ==
Between 1999 and 2000, she was a judicial law clerk for Judge Mary M. Schroeder of the United States Court of Appeals for the Ninth Circuit. Between 2000 and 2003, she worked as a litigation associate at Wilmer Cutler Pickering Hale and Dorr.

Honig has worked in various roles in the office of the United States Attorney for the District of New Jersey. She served as assistant United States Attorney in the Criminal and Special Prosecutions Divisions from 2003 to 2010, as deputy chief of the Criminal Division from 2010 to 2013, and as counsel to the U.S. Attorney from 2013 to 2016. She left government to work as a litigation and compliance investigations counsel at Celgene in Summit west of Newark, New Jersey. In March 2018, she was appointed first assistant United States Attorney by then-United States Attorney Craig Carpenito.

Honig is currently the chief compliance officer at Rutgers University in New Jersey.

== Personal life ==
Honig's husband, Elie Honig, is also a former assistant United States attorney. They have two children, son Aaron and daughter Leah, and live in Metuchen, New Jersey, which is near Rutgers University.
