= Hemant Lakhani =

Hemant Lakhani (1935 – June 19, 2013) was an Indian-born British rice trader and sari salesman. He was convicted in 2005 of illegal arms dealing after purchasing a fake surface-to-air missile from a Russian intelligence agent posing as a disgruntled military officer, then attempting to sell that missile to an informant working for FBI and posing as a Somali terrorist.

== Background ==
Born in Gujarat, Lakhani moved to London in 1974. Lakhani and his wife Kusum ran a number of businesses, including an export/import business Multitrade (London) Ltd and Reliance Clothing Company Ltd.

== Investigations ==
On 12 August 2003, as a result of a sting operation arranged as a result of cooperation between the American, British and Russian intelligence agencies, Lakhani was intercepted attempting to bring what he had thought was an older-generation Igla into the United States. He is said to have intended the missile to be used in an attack on Air Force One, the American presidential plane, or on a commercial US airliner, and is understood to have planned to buy 50 more of these weapons.

After the FSB detected the dealer in Russia, he was approached by US undercover agents posing as terrorists wanting to shoot down a commercial plane. He was then provided with an inert Igla by undercover Russian agents, and arrested in Newark, New Jersey, when making the delivery to the undercover US agent. An Indian citizen residing in Malaysia, Moinuddeen Ahmed Hameed and an American Yehuda Abraham who allegedly provided money to buy the missile were also arrested.

The extent of Lakhani's background in Russia remains unknown, although one of his fellow directors in the Reliance Clothing Company is known to maintain a Moscow address. He was first noticed by the FSB in March 2003 and his past is presently being investigated by India's Central Bureau of Investigation.

It is thought that he approached the Degtyaryov Plant to purchase the missile after researching the company on the internet. Due to a tip-off from MI6, the FSB agent posed as a representative of the company to sell him a disabled Igla missile.

There is some evidence that MI6 grew interested in him after he made contact with Ukrspetsexport, an arms company suspected of supplying illegal arms to Iraq.

=== Criticism of American investigation ===
U.S. government agents were continuously involved with Lakhani's case, many claim to the point of entrapment. It is not clear that Lakhani, before allegedly being convinced by US agents, would have wished to obtain support for terrorism. It is also unclear whether Lakhani could ever have delivered on his promises of illegal arms to a government informant: When Lakhani was unable to obtain a missile, the U.S. government, acting through the intelligence community, provided him with one. Such counterterrorist strategies have been described by legal scholars as window dressing, because they target supposed enemies who are so weak as not to be a threat, and divert resources from addressing real threats.

In a 2006 article in The Nation, Christopher Hayes wrote,

In August 2003, to cite just one example, the New York dailies breathlessly reported what one US official called an "incredible triumph in the war against terrorism," the arrest of Hemant Lakhani, a supposed terrorist mastermind caught red-handed attempting to acquire a surface-to-air missile. Only later did the government admit that the "plot" consisted of an FBI informant begging Lakhani to find him a missile, while a Russian intelligence officer called up Lakhani and offered to sell him one.

Lakhani's involvement with U.S. government agents and intelligence has been the subject of an episode of the public radio show This American Life, aired in 2005 and 2009.

== Conviction ==
Lakhani was prosecuted by U.S. Attorney for the District of New Jersey Chris Christie. He was convicted by jury in April 2005 of attempting to provide material support to terrorists, unlawful brokering of foreign defense articles and attempting to import merchandise into the U.S. by means of false statements, plus two counts of money laundering. He was sentenced to 47 years in prison, and died in 2013.
