= William W. Robertson =

American lawyer (1941–2008)

United States Attorney for the District of New Jersey (acting)
- In office 1980–1981
- Preceded by: Robert J. Del Tufo
- Succeeded by: W. Hunt Dumont

Personal details
- Born: November 3, 1941
- Died: July 10, 2008 (aged 66)
- Education: Rutgers College; Rutgers School of Law—Newark

William W. Robertson (November 3, 1941 – July 10, 2008) was an American lawyer who served as Acting United States Attorney for the District of New Jersey from 1980 to 1981.

== Education ==
Robertson graduated from Rutgers College in 1964 and Rutgers School of Law—Newark in 1967.

== Career ==
After receiving his law degree, he was a clerk to New Jersey Superior Court judge Merritt Lane, Jr. of Monmouth County from 1967 to 1968. From 1968 to 1972 he served as a captain in the United States Army Judge Advocate General's Corps.

In 1972, he joined the office of the U.S. Attorney for the District of New Jersey as an Assistant U.S. Attorney. He was the Chief of the Department of Justice Organized Crime Strike Force for the District of New Jersey from 1976 to 1978, and the First Assistant U.S. Attorney from 1978 to 1980 under Robert J. Del Tufo.

In September 1980, after Del Tufo resigned from his position as the U.S. Attorney, Robertson was sworn in to fill the remainder of his term. He served until December 1981, when the new U.S. Attorney, W. Hunt Dumont, was sworn into office.

After leaving office, he joined the law firm of Hannoch Weisman, P.C., where he worked for eighteen years. He went on to cofound the firm of Robertson, Freilich, Bruno & Cohen, LLC in January 1999.

== Death ==
Robertson died on July 10, 2008, at the age of 66. He was survived by his wife Betsy and his three children from a prior marriage.

Legal offices
Preceded by Robert J. Del Tufo	United States Attorney for the District of New Jersey; 1980–1981	Succeeded by W. Hunt Dumont
