= James S. Green (attorney) =

American lawyer

James Green

United States Attorney for the District of New Jersey
- In office 1835–1850
- President: Andrew Jackson; Martin Van Buren; William Henry Harrison; John Tyler; James K. Polk; Zachary Taylor
- Preceded by: Garret Wall
- Succeeded by: William Halstead

Personal details
- Born: July 21, 1792 Philadelphia, Pennsylvania, U.S.
- Died: November 8, 1862 (aged 70) Princeton, New Jersey, U.S.
- Party: Democratic
- Spouse: Isabella Williamson McCulloh
- Children: Judge Ashbel Green (1825–1898); Anna McCulloh Green (1827-1917); James Sproat Green (1829–1892); Robert Stockton Green (1831–1895); Isabella Green (1834–1906)
- Education: Dickinson College (BA)

James Sproat Green (July 21, 1792 – November 8, 1862) was an American lawyer who served as U.S. Attorney for the District of New Jersey from 1835 to 1850. He was the father of New Jersey Governor Robert Stockton Green.

== Biography ==
Green was born in Philadelphia, Pennsylvania in 1792, the son of Ashbel Green and Elizabeth (Stockton) Green. His father was Chaplain of the United States House of Representatives from 1792 to 1800 and President of Princeton University from 1812 to 1822. He graduated from Dickinson College in 1811. He was admitted to the New Jersey bar in 1817, as counsellor in 1821, and as sergeant in 1834.

In 1835, Green was appointed U.S. Attorney for the District of New Jersey by President Andrew Jackson. He continued to serve until 1850.

In 1844, he was nominated by President John Tyler to be Secretary of the Treasury, but the nomination was not confirmed by the Senate.

He was a trustee of the College of New Jersey (later Princeton University) from 1828 to 1862. In 1847, when Princeton Law School was founded, Green was named professor of jurisprudence on a faculty that also included Joseph Coerten Hornblower and Richard Stockton Field. He held the professorship until 1855.

=== Children ===
He married Isabella Williamson McCulloh (1792–1865) on January 25, 1825. They had five children:

- Judge Ashbel Green (1825–1898) who was a co-founder of the New York bar association
- Anna McCulloh Green (1827-1917)
- James Sproat Green (1829–1892)
- Robert Stockton Green (1831–1895), Governor of New Jersey
- Isabella Green (1834–1906)

Green died in Princeton in 1862.

== See also ==
- Unsuccessful nominations to the Cabinet of the United States

Legal offices
Preceded by Garret Wall	United States Attorney for the District of New Jersey; 1835–1850	Succeeded by William Halstead
Party political offices
Preceded by Philemon Dickerson	Democratic nominee for Governor of New Jersey; 1837	Succeeded by Daniel Haines
