= Job H. Lippincott =

American judge (1842–1900)

Job Hilliard Lippincott
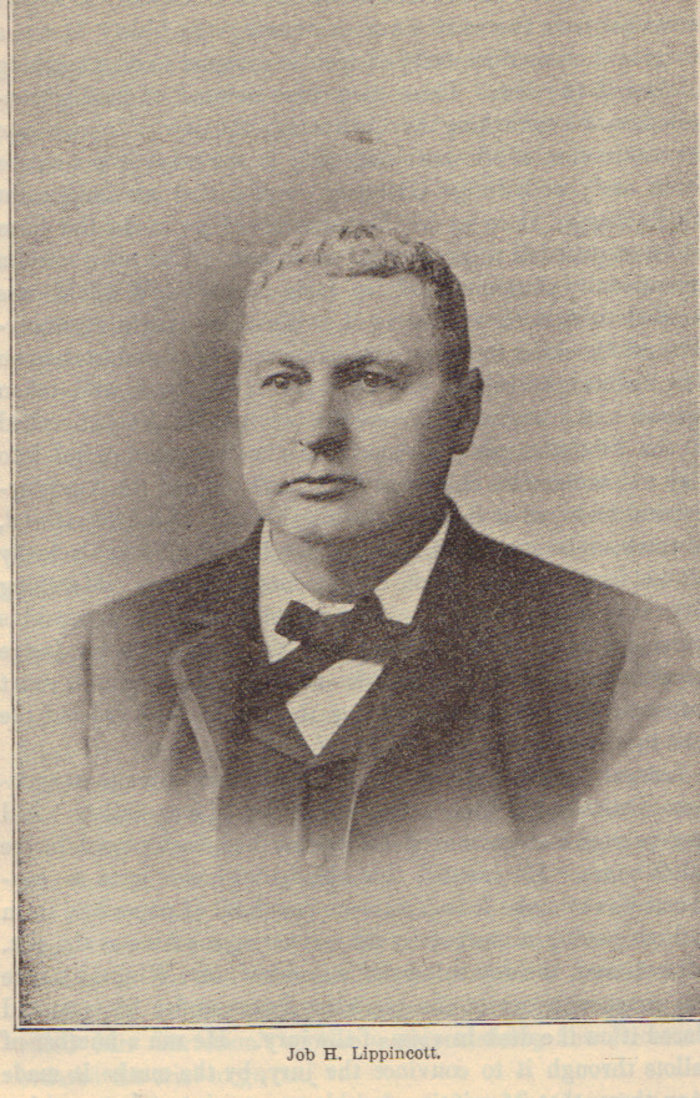
- Lippincott circa 1890

Justice of the Supreme Court of New Jersey
- In office 1893–1900
- Preceded by: George Theodore Werts

U.S. Attorney for the District of New Jersey
- In office 1886–1887
- Preceded by: Anthony Quinton Keasbey
- Succeeded by: Samuel Fowler Bigelow

Personal details
- Born: November 12, 1842 Vincentown, New Jersey
- Died: July 5, 1900 (aged 57) Jersey City, New Jersey

Job Hilliard Lippincott (November 12, 1842 – July 5, 1900) was a lawyer who served as United States Attorney for the District of New Jersey and was an associate justice of the New Jersey Supreme Court.

== Biography ==
He was born on November 12, 1842, near Mount Holly, New Jersey, to a Quaker farmer and raised on the family farm in the Vincentown section of Southampton Township, New Jersey. He attended Mount Holly Seminary. He is an 1865 graduate, with the degree of Bachelor of Laws, of the Dane Law School at Harvard University.

He was president of the board of education of Hudson City, New Jersey, from 1868 to 1871. He married Keziah Budd on August 19, 1878, and they had a son, Job Herbert Lippincott.

=== Judicial Service ===
Lippincott was United States Attorney for New Jersey from 1886 to 1887 and associate justice of the New Jersey Supreme Court from 1893 to 1900, replacing George Theodore Werts.

=== Death ===
He died at his home, at 132 Sip Avenue, Jersey City, New Jersey, on July 5, 1900. He was interred in Mount Holly Cemetery.

== See also ==
- List of justices of the Supreme Court of New Jersey
- New Jersey Court of Errors and Appeals
- Courts of New Jersey
