= Anthony Quinton Keasbey =

American Lawyer and writer

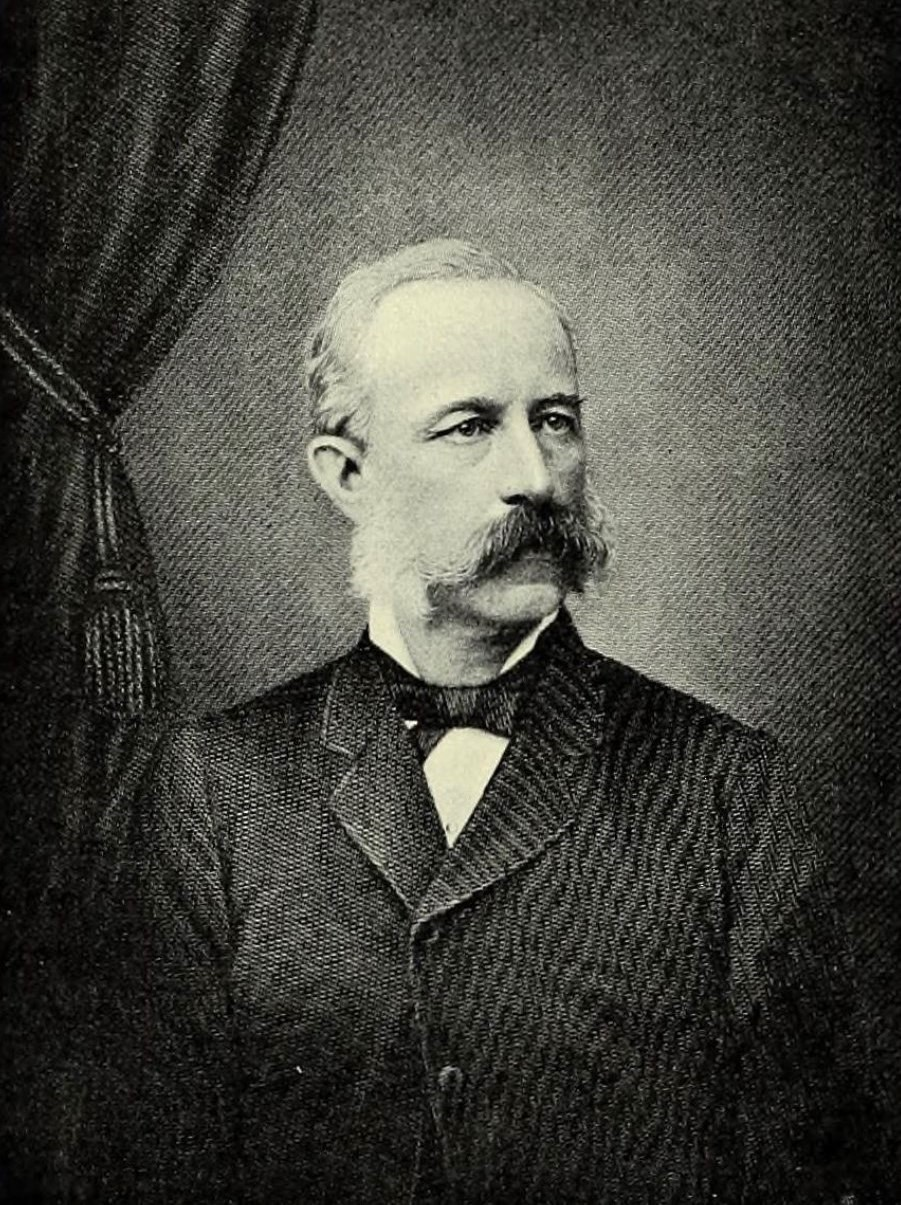

U.S. Attorney for the District of New Jersey
- In office 1861–1886
- President: Abraham Lincoln, Andrew Johnson, Ulysses S. Grant, Rutherford B. Hayes, James Garfield, Chester A. Arthur, and Grover Cleveland
- Preceded by: Garret S. Cannon
- Succeeded by: Job Hilliard Lippincott

Personal details
- Born: March 1, 1824 Salem, New Jersey
- Died: April 4, 1895 (aged 71) Rome, Italy
- Education: Yale University, B.A. (1843)
- Profession: Lawyer; author

Anthony Quinton Keasbey (March 1, 1824 – April 4, 1895) was an American lawyer who served as United States Attorney for the District of New Jersey under seven presidents. In addition he authored a book on poetry called From the Hudson to the St. Johns and Home Flowers: Pressed in My Law-books. He was also a part of the writing of Marching Song of the First Arkansas, in addition he wrote a law book called Slavery in New Jersey.

== Early life ==
Keasbey was born March 1, 1824, to Dr. Edward Keasbey and Mary Parry, the second of five siblings in Salem, New Jersey, a town colonized by his ancestors. In 1843 he graduated from Yale University, and soon after became a law student in the office of Francis L. McCulloch. He finished his studies in Newark, New Jersey, and in October 1846, was admitted to the bar. He entered upon the practice of his profession. In 1855 he entered into a partnership with Courtlandt Parker, a relation would last for over twenty years.

== U.S. attorney ==
In April 1861, he received the appointment of U.S. attorney for the district of New Jersey from President Lincoln, and in 1865 was reappointed. It was discovered, however, after Lincoln's death, that the commission for his 1865 reappointment had not been signed, and Keasbey was thereupon appointed by President Johnson until the next session of the senate. In 1866, he was regularly commissioned for another term of four years. In 1870 he was reappointed by President Grant, and again in 1874. In 1879 the office was once more accorded to him for a term of four years. He thus held this position continuously from the spring of 1861 to that of 1886, a period of unbroken incumbency longer than that of any other U.S. district attorney in the Union.

== Later life ==
In 1876 the partnership which existed between Keasbey and Parker was dissolved, and Keasbey associated with himself his two of his sons, Edward Quinton and George, under the firm name of A. Q. Keasbey & Sons. He made several valuable contributions to the pamphlet and periodical literature of his day, and without seeking reputation as a poet, wrote and privately printed for many beautiful verses such as his book From the Hudson to the St. John's. He authored a few books under a pseudonym and some anonymously, and books have been made from his notes and poems after his death. Keasbey died on April 4, 1895, while in Rome.

== Bibliography ==
Some of Anthony's writings

- Anthony Q., Keasbey (March 15, 1886). "The power of Congress over navigable waters". From the New Jersey Law Journal for March, 1886: 9–26. OCLC 053828417.
- Keasbey, Anthony Q. (1886). The sun, how man has regarded it in different ages an address read before the Long Island historical society, April 8, 1881. Newark.
- Keasbey, Anthony Q. (1885). Isthmus transit by Chiriqui and Golfo Dulce.
- Keasbey, Anthony Q. (January 19, 1882). "The bi-centennial of the purchase of East New Jersey by the proprietors". A Paper Read Before the New Jersey Historical Society, at Trenton, Jan. 19, 1882.
- Keasbey, Anthony Q. (1874). From the Hudson to the St. Johns. Newark, New Jersey: Press of the Newark daily advertiser. ISBN 9780267685868.
