= New Jersey Division of Criminal Justice =

New Jersey prosecutorial agency

- Seal of the DCJ

Division overview
- Formed: May 21, 1970; 56 years ago
- Jurisdiction: Government of New Jersey
- Headquarters: Richard J. Hughes Justice Complex 25 Market Street, Trenton, New Jersey
- Division executive: Martha Nye, Interim Director
- Parent department: New Jersey Department of Law and Public Safety
- Website: njoag.gov/about/divisions-and-offices/division-of-criminal-justice-home/

The New Jersey Division of Criminal Justice (DCJ) is a statewide law enforcement and prosecutorial agency within the New Jersey Department of Law and Public Safety in the U.S. state of New Jersey. The division investigates and prosecutes violations of state criminal law and oversees complex or multi-jurisdictional criminal cases across the state.

The division operates under the authority of the Attorney General of New Jersey and works with the state's 21 county prosecutors' offices to coordinate criminal investigations and ensure uniform enforcement of criminal law throughout the state.

Its responsibilities include investigating and prosecuting organized crime, public corruption, financial crimes, and other major criminal offenses that may extend beyond the jurisdiction of a single county prosecutor's office.

The Division of Criminal Justice is led by a director appointed by the attorney general. The director supervises assistant prosecutors, detectives, and professional staff who conduct statewide criminal investigations and prosecutions on behalf of the State of New Jersey.

== Notable cases and actions ==
The Division of Criminal Justice has been involved in major public corruption and criminal enforcement efforts in New Jersey, often working in coordination with federal and county authorities. One of the most significant corruption crackdowns in the state’s history was the 2009 investigation known as Operation Bid Rig, which resulted in charges against dozens of public officials, including mayors and political figures. State-level prosecutors, including those within the DCJ, have historically played a role in coordinating and pursuing such multi-jurisdictional corruption cases.

The division has also handled prosecutions involving senior law enforcement officials. In 2010, former New Jersey State Police Superintendent Joseph Santiago pleaded guilty to official misconduct following a state investigation into his conduct while in office.

Beyond public corruption, the DCJ has prosecuted large-scale financial crimes and fraud schemes affecting residents across the state. These cases have included healthcare fraud, securities violations, and other white-collar offenses that require coordination across multiple jurisdictions.

The division also contributes to broader statewide enforcement initiatives targeting gun violence, narcotics trafficking, and organized criminal activity, often working alongside local police, county prosecutors, and federal agencies.

== Directors of the New Jersey Division of Criminal Justice ==
Directors of the New Jersey Division of Criminal Justice
#	Director	Term start	Term end	Notes
1	Vaughn L. McCoy	2002	2006	Served during the McGreevey and Codey administrations
2	Gregory A. Paw	February 21, 2006	June 20, 2008	Appointed by Attorney General Zulima Farber
3	Deborah L. Gramiccioni	2008	2010	Appointed by Attorney General Anne Milgram
4	Stephen J. Taylor	2010	2012	Served during the Christie administration
5	Elie Honig	2012	2018	Later became a senior legal analyst for CNN
6	Veronica Allende	2018	2021	First Hispanic director of the division
7	Lyndsay V. Ruotolo	July 12, 2021	2023	Appointed by Attorney General Gurbir Grewal
8	J. Stephen Ferketic	August 14, 2023	2025	Appointed by Attorney General Matthew Platkin
9	Theresa L. Hilton	2025	Incumbent	Appointed by

== Related legislation ==
- 1970: Criminal Justice Act of 1970, P.L. 1970, c. 74
