= W. Hunt Dumont =

American lawyer and judge

United States Attorney for the District of New Jersey
- In office December 1981 – August 1985
- President: Ronald Reagan
- Preceded by: William W. Robertson (acting)
- Succeeded by: Thomas W. Greelish

Personal details
- Born: August 12, 1941 (age 85)
- Education: Lafayette College (BA); Seton Hall University (LLB)

Wayne Hunt Dumont (born August 12, 1941) is an American lawyer and judge who served as United States Attorney for the District of New Jersey from 1981 to 1985.

== Biography ==
Dumont was born in 1941, the son of the former Helen S. Williamson and Wayne Dumont, Jr. of Phillipsburg, New Jersey. His father served more than 30 years in the New Jersey Legislature and was the Republican candidate for Governor of New Jersey in 1965.

He received his B.A. degree from Lafayette College and his LL.B. from Seton Hall University School of Law.

He worked in the Newark law firm of Stryker, Tams & Dill, and then was recruited to work for the United States Attorney for the District of New Jersey, Frederick B. Lacey, from 1969 to 1971. He worked on official corruption cases that led to the convictions of Newark Mayor Hugh J. Addonizio and Hudson County political boss John V. Kenny. He returned to private practice, working as a partner at the Newark law firm of the Robinson, Wayne & Greenberg for ten years.

In October 1981, Dumont was nominated by President Ronald Reagan to be U.S. Attorney for the District of New Jersey. He was sworn into office in December 1981, serving until August 1985.

Dumont was later appointed to be a judge on the New Jersey Superior Court. He was Presiding Judge of the Civil Division in the Morris/Sussex Vicinage and sat in Morristown. In June 2008 he was appointed Acting Assignment Judge for the Morris/Sussex Vicinage.

Legal offices
| Preceded by William W. Robertson | United States Attorney for the District of New Jersey; 1981 – 1985 | Succeeded by Thomas W. Greelish |
