= William Halstead =

American politician (1794-1878)

William Halsted
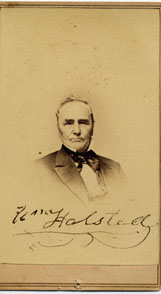

United States House of Representatives
- In office March 4, 1837 – March 3, 1839
- In office March 4, 1841 – March 3, 1843

U.S. Attorney for the District of New Jersey
- In office 1849–1853
- President: Zachary Taylor
- Preceded by: James S. Green
- Succeeded by: Garret S. Cannon

Personal details
- Born: June 4, 1794 Elizabeth, New Jersey
- Died: March 4, 1878 (aged 83) Trenton, New Jersey
- Party: Whig
- Education: Princeton College (BA)(1812)
- Profession: Lawyer; Politician

Military service
- Allegiance: United States
- Branch/service: United States Army
- Years of service: April 12, 1861 -February 18, 1862
- Rank: Colonel
- Unit: 1st New Jersey Volunteer Cavalry

William Halstead (June 4, 1794 – March 4, 1878) was an American Whig Party politician who represented New Jersey at large in the United States House of Representatives from 1837 to 1839, and again from 1841 to 1843.

Halstead was born in Elizabeth, New Jersey on June 4, 1794. He graduated from Princeton College in 1812, studied law, was admitted to the bar in 1816, and commenced practice in Trenton, New Jersey. He was appointed reporter of the New Jersey Supreme Court on November 23, 1821, and served until 1832. He published seven volumes of Halstead's Law Reports. He was prosecuting attorney of Hunterdon County from 1824 to 1829 and 1833 to 1837.

Halstead was elected as a Whig to the Twenty-fifth Congress, serving from March 4, 1837 – March 3, 1839. He presented credentials as a Member-elect to the Twenty-sixth Congress but the House declined to seat him. He was elected to the Twenty-seventh Congress, serving from March 4, 1841 – March 3, 1843. He served as chairman of the United States House Committee on Elections in the Twenty-seventh Congress.

After leaving Congress, he was appointed by President Zachary Taylor as U.S. Attorney for the District of New Jersey and served from 1849 to 1853. He raised the 1st New Jersey Volunteer Cavalry during the American Civil War and served as its colonel until February 18, 1862. He retired from public life and died in Trenton on March 4, 1878, and was interred there in Riverview Cemetery.

U.S. House of Representatives
Preceded by Samuel Fowler	Member of the U.S. House of Representatives from New Jersey's at-large congressional district 1837–1839	Succeeded by William R. Cooper
Preceded by William R. Cooper	Member of the U.S. House of Representatives from New Jersey's at-large congressional district 1841–1843	Succeeded by District inactive
