= William R. Cooper =

American politician (1793 – 1856)

William Raworth Cooper (February 20, 1793 – September 22, 1856) was a Representative from New Jersey.

He was born near Bridgeport, Gloucester County, New Jersey, February 20, 1793 and attended the local schools. He engaged in agricultural pursuits. He was a member of the New Jersey General Assembly, from 1839 to 1841. He was elected as a Democrat to the 26th United States Congress (March 4, 1839 – March 3, 1841) and resumed agricultural pursuits until his death near Bridgeport on September 22, 1856. He is interred in the Cooper family burying ground, near Bridgeport.

U.S. House of Representatives
Preceded by William Halstead	Member of the U.S. House of Representatives from New Jersey's at-large congressional district 1839–1841	Succeeded by William Halstead
