= Peter N. Perretti Jr. =

American lawyer

Attorney General of New Jersey
- In office February 14, 1989 – January 16, 1990
- Governor: Thomas Kean
- Preceded by: W. Cary Edwards
- Succeeded by: Robert Del Tufo

Personal details
- Born: October 4, 1931 Passaic County, New Jersey
- Died: February 27, 2016 (aged 84)
- Spouse: Ruth
- Children: 3
- Education: Colgate University; Cornell Law School (LL.B.)

Peter N. Perretti Jr. (October 4, 1931 – February 27, 2016) was an American lawyer who served as Attorney General of New Jersey from 1989 to 1990.

== Biography ==
Raised in Passaic, New Jersey, Perretti attended Montclair Kimberley Academy, where he competed in prep baseball and basketball, graduating in the class of 1949. He graduated from Colgate University in 1953 and received his law degree from Cornell Law School in 1956. He clerked for retired Superior Court Judge Alexander P. Waugh.

He served as Assistant Prosecutor in Essex County from 1958 until 1960. He was a partner in the firm of Riker, Danzig, Scherer, Hyland & Perretti in Newark, joining the firm as an associate in 1960 and becoming a partner in 1963.

Perretti served on the board of Montclair Kimberley Academy (MKA). He served as chairman of the board, and was an architect of the merger of Montclair Academy and The Kimberley School in 1974.

Perretti was sworn in as Attorney General of New Jersey on February 14, 1989, replacing W. Cary Edwards, who resigned. As Attorney General, he led in the prosecution of New Jersey beach polluters, in the development of legislation to restrict automatic weapons, in improving oversight of the financing of Atlantic City casinos, and in combating organized crime.

A resident of Montclair, New Jersey, Perretti died on February 27, 2016. He and his wife, Ruth, had three children.

== Sources ==
- Official bio, Office of the Attorney General of New Jersey. Accessed March 20, 2008.

Legal offices
Preceded by W. Cary Edwards	Attorney General of New Jersey; 1989 – 1990	Succeeded by Robert Del Tufo
