= New Jersey Department of Law and Public Safety =

- Seal of the New Jersey Attorney General

Department overview
- Formed: January 1, 1949; 77 years ago
- Jurisdiction: Government of New Jersey
- Headquarters: Richard J. Hughes Justice Complex 25 Market Street, Trenton, New Jersey
- Annual budget: US$1.4 billion (FY2027) (26% federal)
- Department executives: Jennifer Davenport, Attorney General; Katherine Calle, First Assistant Attorney General; Michael Zuckerman, Associate Attorney General; Sundeep Iyer, Solicitor General
- Child agencies: New Jersey Division of Alcoholic Beverage Control; New Jersey Division of Consumer Affairs; New Jersey Division of Criminal Justice; New Jersey Division on Civil Rights; New Jersey Division of Gaming Enforcement; New Jersey Division of Highway Traffic Safety; New Jersey Division of Law; New Jersey Juvenile Justice Commission; New Jersey Racing Commission; New Jersey State Athletic Control Board; New Jersey State Police; New Jersey Victims of Crime Compensation Agency
- Website: https://www.njoag.gov/

The New Jersey Department of Law and Public Safety is a governmental agency in the U.S. state of New Jersey that focuses on protection of the lives and property of New Jersey residents and visitors. The department operates under the supervision of the New Jersey attorney general. The department is responsible for safeguarding "civil and consumer rights, promoting highway traffic safety, maintaining public confidence in the alcoholic beverage, gaming and racing industries and providing legal services and counsel to other state agencies."

== Offices ==
The following offices are under the control of the department and overseen by the attorney general: Child Protection and Advocacy; Corrections and State Police; Education; Employment Litigation; Environmental Protection; Health and Human Services; Judiciary and Prosecutors; Labor and Community Affairs; Tort Litigation; Transportation, and Treasury and Taxation.

== Related legislation ==
- 1948: Department of Law and Public Safety Act of 1948, P.L. 1948, c. 439
