= 1886 New Jersey gubernatorial election =

- November 2, 1886
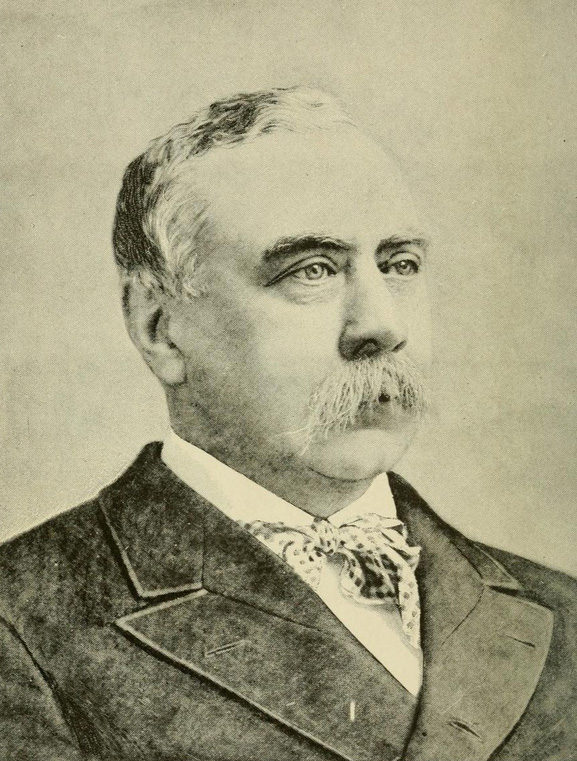

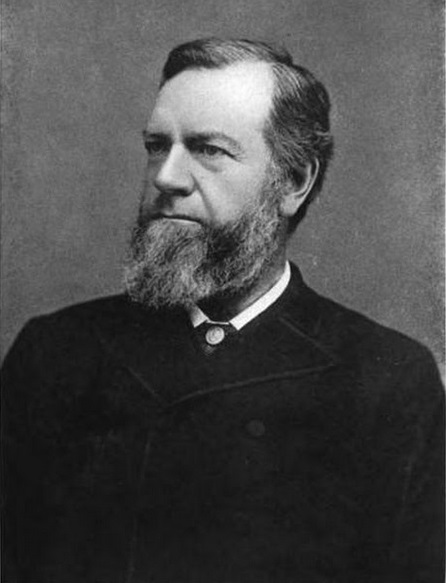

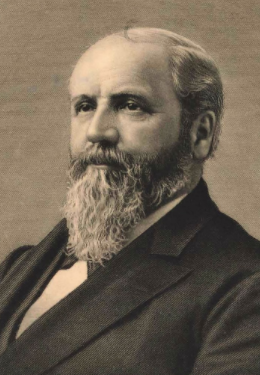
Nominee	Robert Stockton Green	Benjamin Franklin Howey	Clinton B. Fisk
Party	Democratic	Republican	Prohibition
Popular vote	109,939	101,919	19,808
Percentage	47.44%	43.98%	8.55%
- County Results; Green: 40–50% 50–60% 60–70% Howey: 40–50% 50–60%
Governor before election
Leon Abbett
Democratic
Elected Governor
Robert Stockton Green
Democratic

The 1886 New Jersey gubernatorial election was held on November 2, 1886. Democratic nominee Robert Stockton Green defeated Republican nominee Benjamin Franklin Howey with 47.44% of the vote.

== General election ==
=== Candidates ===
- Clinton B. Fisk, banker and Civil War general (Prohibition)
- Robert Stockton Green, U.S. Representative from Elizabeth (Democratic)
- Benjamin Franklin Howey, former U.S. Representative from Columbia (Republican)

=== Results ===
New Jersey gubernatorial election, 1886
Party	Candidate	Votes	%	±%
Democratic	Robert Stockton Green	109,939	47.44%	▼2.49
Republican	Benjamin Franklin Howey	101,919	43.98%	▼2.67
Prohibition	Clinton B. Fisk	19,808	8.55%	▲6.55
Majority				
Total votes		231,666	100.00%	
Democratic hold		Swing		
