= Samuel Fowler Bigelow =

American judge, attorney and author (1837–1915)

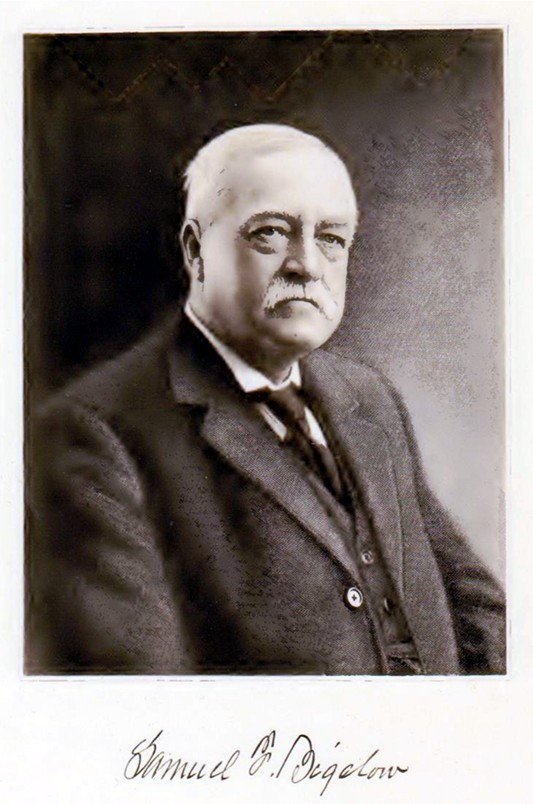

U.S. Attorney for the District of New Jersey
- In office 1887–1888
- President: Grover Cleveland
- Preceded by: Job H. Lippincott
- Succeeded by: George S. Duryee

Judge of Newark City Court
- In office 1868–?

Personal details
- Born: March 29, 1837 Newark, New Jersey, US
- Died: March 8, 1915 (aged 77) East Orange, New Jersey, US
- Resting place: Mount Pleasant Cemetery
- Party: Democratic
- Education: Newark Academy; Ashland Hall; Freehold Institute
- Alma mater: Princeton College (1857)
- Profession: Lawyer politician author judge

Samuel Fowler Bigelow (March 29, 1837 – March 8, 1915) was an American judge, attorney, and author in New Jersey.

== Biography ==
Samuel Fowler Bigelow was born in Newark, New Jersey on March 29, 1837, the son of Moses Bigelow, who served as the Mayor of Newark from 1857 to 1864. He was educated at Newark Academy, Ashland Hall, and Freehold Institute. He graduated from Princeton College in 1857 and became City Attorney of Newark, New Jersey in 1863. He became a judge of the Newark City Court in 1868.

President Grover Cleveland appointed him United States Attorney for the District of New Jersey. He also served as Supreme Court Commissioner for the Supreme Court of New Jersey and was appointed Special Master in Chancery by Chancellor William T. McGill. Judge Andrew Kirkpatrick appointed him as United States Commissioner for New Jersey. He wrote the book Biographical Sketch of Moses Bigelow (1890) about his father Moses Bigelow He married Lucy Paul Bigelow on January 3, 1861, in Belvedere, Warren County, New Jersey.

Samuel Fowler Bigelow died at his sister's home in East Orange on March 8, 1915, and was buried at Mount Pleasant Cemetery in Newark.
