= Thomas W. Greelish =

American lawyer (1939–1991)

United States Attorney for the District of New Jersey
- In office August 1985 – March 1987
- President: Ronald Reagan
- Preceded by: W. Hunt Dumont
- Succeeded by: Samuel Alito

Personal details
- Born: December 31, 1939 Manhattan, New York City, U.S.
- Died: June 23, 1991 (aged 51) Morristown, New Jersey, U.S.
- Education: Dickinson College; Rutgers University, Newark (BA); Seton Hall University (JD)

Thomas William Greelish (December 31, 1939 – June 23, 1991) was an American lawyer who served as United States Attorney for the District of New Jersey from 1985 to 1987.

== Biography ==
Greelish was born on December 31, 1939, in Manhattan, New York City to Mildred and William Greelish. At the age of 7 he moved with his family to Califon, New Jersey. He attended Dickinson College from 1957 to 1959 and then dropped out of college and worked at a brewery. He decided to return to school full-time, attending night classes and graduating from Rutgers–Newark in 1967 with a B.A. degree. He received a J.D. degree from Seton Hall University School of Law in 1971.

Greelish worked as law secretary to U.S. District Judge Frederick Bernard Lacey in 1971. Later that year, he began working in the office of the United States Attorney for the District of New Jersey. He was an assistant prosecutor under U.S. Attorney Herbert Jay Stern, serving in that position until 1976.

In 1976 he joined the Morristown law firm of Schenck, Price, Smith & King. He became First Assistant Attorney General of New Jersey in 1982, and then first assistant U.S. Attorney in 1983 under W. Hunt Dumont.

From August 1985 to March 1987, Greelish was the U.S. Attorney for the District of New Jersey. During his tenure he prosecuted cases dealing with organized crime, white-collar fraud and drug trafficking. Among the cases he handled was the prosecution of Susan Rosenberg and Timothy Blunk for their role in the Resistance Conspiracy.

He resigned to enter private practice, working as a partner in the Newark office of LeBoeuf, Lamb, Leiby & MacRae (later known as LeBoeuf, Lamb, Greene & MacRae).

In 1991 Greelish died of a pulmonary embolism after attending an outdoor symphony performance in Morristown, New Jersey. He was 51 and lived in Mendham Township with his wife Peggy Ann.

== Legacy ==
He was survived by his wife Peggy, daughter Sharon Greelish Cody, J.D. (Director of Growth and Engagement at KINBER, a digital opportunity nonprofit), and son James P. Greelish, M.D.(Assistant Professor Columbia University, Director of Cardiothoracic Surgery Caromont Healthcare, Inc.). His other son William Robert Greelish died of Duchene's muscular dystrophy at the age of 25.

Legal offices
Preceded by W. Hunt Dumont	United States Attorney for the District of New Jersey; 1985 – 1987	Succeeded by Samuel Alito
