= Robert Del Tufo =

American lawyer

Attorney General of New Jersey
- In office January 16, 1990 – August 24, 1993
- Governor: James Florio
- Preceded by: Peter N. Perretti, Jr.
- Succeeded by: Deborah Poritz

United States Attorney for the District of New Jersey
- In office 1977–1980
- President: Jimmy Carter
- Preceded by: Jonathan L. Goldstein
- Succeeded by: William W. Robertson (acting)

Personal details
- Born: November 18, 1933 Newark, New Jersey, U.S.
- Died: March 2, 2016 (aged 82) Princeton, New Jersey, U.S.
- Party: Democratic
- Spouses: Ann (divorced); Katherine Nouri Hughes (m. 1994)
- Children: 4
- Relatives: Raymond Del Tufo Jr. (brother)
- Education: Princeton University (BA); Yale University (LLB)

Robert J. Del Tufo (November 18, 1933 – March 2, 2016) was an American lawyer. He was the United States Attorney for the District of New Jersey from 1977 to 1980, and later served as the Attorney General of New Jersey from 1990 to 1993.

== Background ==
Del Tufo was born in 1933 in Newark, New Jersey, to Raymond and Mary Del Tufo, who were Italian immigrants. He graduated from the Newark Academy and received a BA degree in 1955 from Princeton University. He received his LLB degree from Yale Law School in 1958. His older brother, Raymond Del Tufo, Jr., was also a lawyer who served as U.S. Attorney for the District of New Jersey.

== Career ==
From 1958 to 1960, Del Tufo served as legal secretary to Chief Justice Joseph Weintraub of the New Jersey Supreme Court. He was admitted to the New Jersey Bar in 1959 and practiced law in Morristown, New Jersey, from 1960 to 1974, and in Newark, New Jersey, from 1980 to 1986.

He served as an assistant prosecutor in Morris County from 1963 to 1965 and as first assistant prosecutor there from 1965 to 1967. Del Tufo held the position of U.S. Attorney for the District of New Jersey from 1977 until resigning in 1980. He was critical of the Abscam operation, arguing that undercover agents had effectively committed entrapment in how they had offered bribes to Senator Harrison A. Williams. However, when Williams later challenged his convictions on these grounds, he was unsuccessful, and Judge George C. Pratt accused New Jersey's federal prosecutors of being too "reluctant" to support the operation.

He sought the Democratic nomination for Governor of New Jersey in 1985, losing in the primary to Essex County executive Peter Shapiro, who in turn lost to Thomas Kean in the general election. He was sworn in as Attorney General on January 16, 1990, the day of Governor James Florio's inauguration, resigning in 1993 to join the New York City firm Skadden, Arps, Slate, Meagher & Flom.

In February 2006, Governor Jon Corzine appointed Del Tufo Chairman the Board of Trustees of the University of Medicine and Dentistry of New Jersey.

== Personal life and death ==
Del Tufo and his first wife, Ann, had four children before divorcing. On March 5, 1994, Del Tufo married Katherine Nouri Hughes, vice president of communications for the Milken Family Foundation. She was previously married to Emmet John Hughes, a journalist and aide to President Dwight D. Eisenhower. Del Tufo became stepfather to her two daughters. In 1985, he was reported to be a resident of Morris Township, New Jersey.

Del Tufo died from lung cancer in Princeton, New Jersey on March 2, 2016, at the age of 82.

Legal offices
Preceded by Jonathan L. Goldstein	United States Attorney for the District of New Jersey; 1977 – 1980	Succeeded by William W. Robertson
Preceded by Peter N. Perretti, Jr.	Attorney General of New Jersey; 1990 – 1993	Succeeded by Deborah Poritz
