= Raymond Del Tufo Jr. =

American judge

United States Attorney for the District of New Jersey
- In office 1954–1956
- Preceded by: William F. Tompkins
- Succeeded by: Herman Scott (acting)

Personal details
- Born: July 31, 1919 Newark, New Jersey, U.S.
- Died: March 18, 1970 (aged 50) East Orange, New Jersey, U.S.
- Education: Princeton University; Rutgers Law School

Raymond Del Tufo Jr. (July 31, 1919 – March 18, 1970) was an American lawyer and judge who served as U.S. Attorney for the District of New Jersey from 1954 to 1956.

== Biography ==
Del Tufo was born in 1919 in Newark, New Jersey, the son of Raymond and Mary Del Tufo. His younger brother, Robert Del Tufo, would later serve as Attorney General of New Jersey. He attended Newark Academy, Princeton University, and Rutgers Law School. He served four years in the United States Army Air Forces and Signal Corps.

He was an associate at the law firm of Lum, Fairlie & Foster before being appointed as First Assistant U.S. Attorney for the District of New Jersey in 1953. In 1954, President Dwight D. Eisenhower appointed him U.S. Attorney for the District of New Jersey. He served until 1956, when he resigned after being diagnosed with multiple sclerosis.

Del Tufo returned to private practice and taught at Seton Hall University School of Law. In 1960, he was appointed to be a judge on the Essex County District Court. He served until his death in 1970 at the age of 50 at the Veterans Administration Hospital in East Orange.

His widow, Elizabeth Del Tufo, is a local historian who served as the chair of the Newark Landmarks and Historic Preservation Commission from 1990 to 2006. She was awarded an honorary Doctor of Humane Letters degree by New Jersey Institute of Technology in 2008.

Legal offices
Preceded by William F. Tompkins	United States Attorney for the District of New Jersey; 1954 – 1956	Succeeded by Herman Scott
