= Craig Carpenito =

American lawyer and official (born 1973)

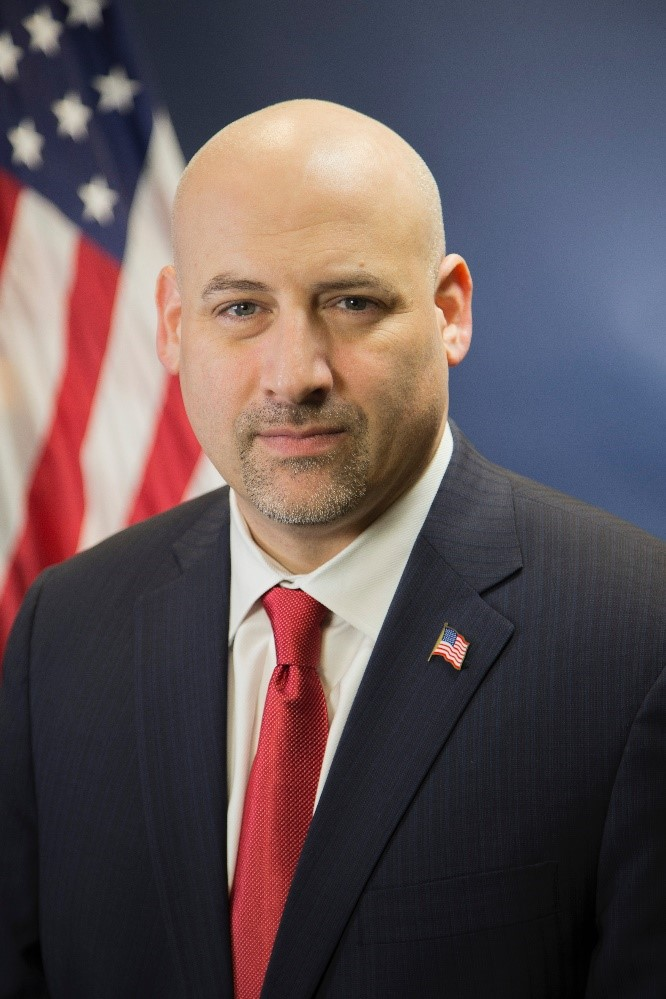
- Official portrait, 2018

United States Attorney for the District of New Jersey
- In office January 5, 2018 – January 5, 2021; Acting: January 5, 2018 – April 27, 2018
- President: Donald Trump
- Preceded by: William Fitzpatrick (Acting)
- Succeeded by: Rachael A. Honig (Acting)

Personal details
- Born: August 1, 1973 (age 53)
- Education: Rider University (BA); Seton Hall University (JD)

Craig Carpenito (born August 1, 1973) is an American lawyer who served as the United States Attorney for the District of New Jersey. On January 5, 2018, Carpenito was appointed U.S. Attorney pursuant to 28 U.S.C. § 546 by US Attorney General Jeff Sessions. On April 27, 2018, the judges of the United States District Court for the District of New Jersey unanimously appointed Carpenito U.S. Attorney pursuant to their statutory powers. He resigned on January 5, 2021. He previously served as a federal prosecutor in the office from 2003 to 2008.

On June 19, 2020, Attorney General William Barr announced that Carpenito would serve as acting U.S. Attorney for the Southern District of New York starting July 3, to replace Geoffrey Berman. However, Berman, whose office had overseen investigations involving President Trump, refused to step down. On June 20, 2020, Barr announced that Trump had fired Berman and that Berman would be replaced by his deputy, Audrey Strauss, by operation of law until a permanent replacement was confirmed by the Senate.

== Education ==
Carpenito received his Bachelor of Arts from Rider University. He received his Juris Doctor from Seton Hall University School of Law.

== Career ==
After graduation from law school, Carpenito joined the New York Regional Office of the U.S. Securities and Exchange Commission's Division of Enforcement. In 2003, he joined the office of the United States Attorney for the District of New Jersey under then U.S. Attorney Christopher J. Christie, where he was responsible for investigating and prosecuting securities and health care fraud, drug trafficking and firearm offenses, as well as other federal crimes.

While serving as an Assistant United States Attorney, he successfully prosecuted the Chairman of Cendant Corporation Walter Forbes for his role in the largest case of accounting fraud in the country's history at the time. On January 17, 2007, Forbes was sentenced to over 12 years in prison, and ordered to make restitution amounting to $3.28 billion. Prior to the conviction of Bernard Madoff, the Forbes restitution order was the largest restitution order ever imposed.

Prior to becoming the U.S. Attorney, he was a partner with the law firm Alston & Bird, where he was a co-chair of the firm's Litigation and Trial Practice Group and its Government and Internal Investigations Team. In April 2012, he was one of five attorneys nationwide to be named a Rising Star by Law360 as one of the top white collar defense attorneys under the age of 40 in the industry. While in private practice, Carpenito represented former Governor Chris Christie in a state court proceeding relating to the Fort Lee lane closure scandal.

Carpenito has been a resident of Monroe Township, Middlesex County, New Jersey.

Legal offices
Preceded by William Fitzpatrick; Acting	United States Attorney for the District of New Jersey; 2018–2021	Succeeded by Rachael A. Honig; Acting
