= Garret S. Cannon =

American lawyer

U.S. Attorney for the District of New Jersey
- In office 1853–1861
- President: Franklin Pierce; James Buchanan
- Preceded by: William Halstead
- Succeeded by: Anthony Quinton Keasbey

New Jersey State Assembly

Personal details
- Born: March 1, 1818 Somerset, New Jersey
- Died: April 2, 1889 (aged 71) Bordentown, New Jersey
- Party: Democratic
- Education: Rutgers, BA (1833)
- Profession: Lawyer

Garret S. Cannon (March 1, 1818 – April 21, 1889) was a lawyer who served as United States Attorney for the District of New Jersey under two presidents.

== Biography ==
Born in Somerset, New Jersey, Garret was born to a professor and a house wife. At 18 he graduated Rutgers in 1833, and soon began to practice law in Mount Holly. He would go on to be a part of the New Jersey State Assembly, and later serve as the United States Attorney for the district of New Jersey from 1853 to 1861. He would go out to live out the rest of his life in Bordentown, New Jersey until his death in 1889.
