= United States Attorney for the District of New Jersey =

Law enforcement officer in New Jersey, US

Coordinates: 40.73022°N 74.17417°W

U.S. Attorney's Office for the District of New Jersey

Department overview
- Formed: September 24, 1789 by the Judiciary Act of 1789
- Jurisdiction: District of New Jersey
- Headquarters: Newark, New Jersey, U.S.
- Department executive: Robert Frazer
- Parent Department: United States Department of Justice
- Website: justice.gov/usao-nj

The U.S. attorney for the District of New Jersey is the chief federal law enforcement officer in New Jersey. The U.S. District Court for the District of New Jersey has jurisdiction over all cases prosecuted by the U.S. attorney. Since March 2026, Robert Frazer has served as the District's United States Attorney.

== Organization ==
The office is organized into divisions handling civil, criminal, and appellate matters, in addition to the Special Prosecutions Division, which oversees political corruption investigations. The District of New Jersey is also divided into three vicinages: Newark, Trenton and Camden, with the southern two offices supervised by a Deputy U.S. Attorney. The office employs approximately 170 Assistant U.S. Attorneys. It is the fifth-largest U.S. Attorney's Office in the nation, behind those in the District of Columbia, Los Angeles, Manhattan, and Miami.

== High-profile cases ==
- Hugh Addonizio - Conviction of former Newark mayor on conspiracy and extortion charges
- BitClub Network (2019) - Indicted five individuals for operating and promoting the BitClub Network, an elaborate, worldwide Ponzi scheme that law enforcement estimates took in more than $1 billion from investors.
- Wayne Bryant - Conviction of former chairman of New Jersey Senate Budget & Appropriations Committee for funneling money to the University of Medicine and Dentistry of New Jersey in exchange for a no-show job at the university.
- Joseph Centanni (2020) - Filed a civil rights lawsuit against a major landlord who repeatedly engaged in a pattern or practice of sexual harassment of numerous tenants and applicants.
- Cognizant (2019) - Charged the former president and the former chief legal officer of Cognizant Technology Solutions Corp. with violations of the FCPA in connection with a foreign bribery scheme.
- Crazy Eddie - Conviction of Eddie Antar, founder and CEO of Crazy Eddie, a consumer electronics chain, for fraud
- Walter Forbes - Conviction of former chairman of Cendant Corporation for fraud.
- EDGAR Hacking Attack (2019) - Indicted Artem Radchenko and Oleksandr Ieremenko for a large-scale, international conspiracy to hack into the Securities and Exchange Commission’s Electronic Data Gathering, Analysis and Retrieval (EDGAR) system and profit by trading on critical information they stole.
- Fort Dix Six (2007) - Conviction of group of six radical Islamist men allegedly plotting attack on Fort Dix military base.
- Fort Lee lane closure scandal (2014)
- Cornelius Gallagher - Guilty plea of New Jersey Congressman for tax evasion
- Nelson G. Gross - Conviction of former Republican state chairman on perjury and obstruction of justice charges
- Sharpe James (2008) - Conviction of former Newark mayor on corruption charges
- Robert C. Janiszewski (2002) - Guilty plea of Hudson County Executive for tax evasion and bribery
- John V. Kenny - Conviction of former Jersey City mayor and chairman of Hudson County Democratic Party on conspiracy, bribery, and extortion charges
- Charles Kushner (2004) - Guilty plea of real estate developer—and largest campaign donor to former New Jersey Governor James E. McGreevey—for filing false tax returns and for attempting to retaliate against a witness in a federal criminal case
- Hemant Lakhani (2005) - Conviction of black market arms dealer attempting to sell shoulder-fired missiles
- Gene Levoff (2019) - indicted former Corporate secretary and Director of corporate law at Apple Inc. for orchestrating a five-year insider trading scheme.
- John A. Lynch, Jr. - Guilty plea of former president of New Jersey Senate for mail fraud and tax evasion
- Newark Violent Crime Initiative (VCI) (2018-2020) - awarded an Attorney General’s Award in October 2019 as the model for cooperative law enforcement among federal, state, county and city agencies. The VCI led to a 30 percent reduction in the number of shooting victims city-wide between 2017 and 2018 and another 39 percent decline in 2019. In 2020, a year in which violent crime spiked in various places across the country, Newark maintained the same low in the number of murders.
- Novartis/Alcon (2020) - Two deferred prosecution agreements regarding significant violations of the Foreign Corrupt Practices Act at Greek and Vietnamese subsidiaries of the Swiss pharmaceutical company Novartis, resulting in penalties of $345 million, representing the second largest criminal and regulatory fine imposed against pharmaceutical companies under the FCPA.
- Operation Bid Rig (2002–2009) - Multi-stage political corruption sweep, resulting in arrest of Hoboken Mayor Peter Cammarano, Secaucus Mayor Dennis Elwell, New Jersey Assemblymen Daniel Van Pelt and L. Harvey Smith, and Jersey City Council President Mariano Vega
- Operation Brace Yourself (2019) - Investigation and prosecution of sweeping durable medical equipment kickback schemes that resulted in the largest healthcare fraud takedown yet pursued by the Department.
- Purdue Pharma (2020) - prosecution of opioid manufacturer Purdue Pharma L.P. for three felonies, including conspiracy to defraud the DEA and Anti-Kickback Statute violations—for its gross misconduct in misbranding and mismarketing OxyContin that amounted to over $8 billion in penalties.
- Samsam Ransomware (2018) - Indicted two Iranians—Faramarz Shahi Savandi and Mohammad Mehdi Shah Mansouri—for conducting the largest ransomware attack in the U.S. that crippled institutions in New Jersey and elsewhere.
- Sarah Brockington Bost (2002), Mayor of Irvington, New Jersey
- Martin Taccetta & Michael Taccetta (1987) - Unsuccessful prosecution of high-ranking members of The Jersey Crew, a faction of the Lucchese crime family
- UMDNJ (2005) - Deferred prosecution agreement overseen by federal monitor Herbert Stern involving Medicaid double-billing and other cases of health care fraud at the University of Medicine and Dentistry of New Jersey.
- Thomas J. Whelan - Conviction of mayor of Jersey City on conspiracy, bribery and extortion charges
- Woodcliff Lake (2018) - Filed a civil rights lawsuit against the Borough of Woodcliff Lake for violations of RLUIPA resulting from the Borough’s efforts to prevent an Orthodox Jewish congregation from building a new place of worship.

== Prominent officeholders ==
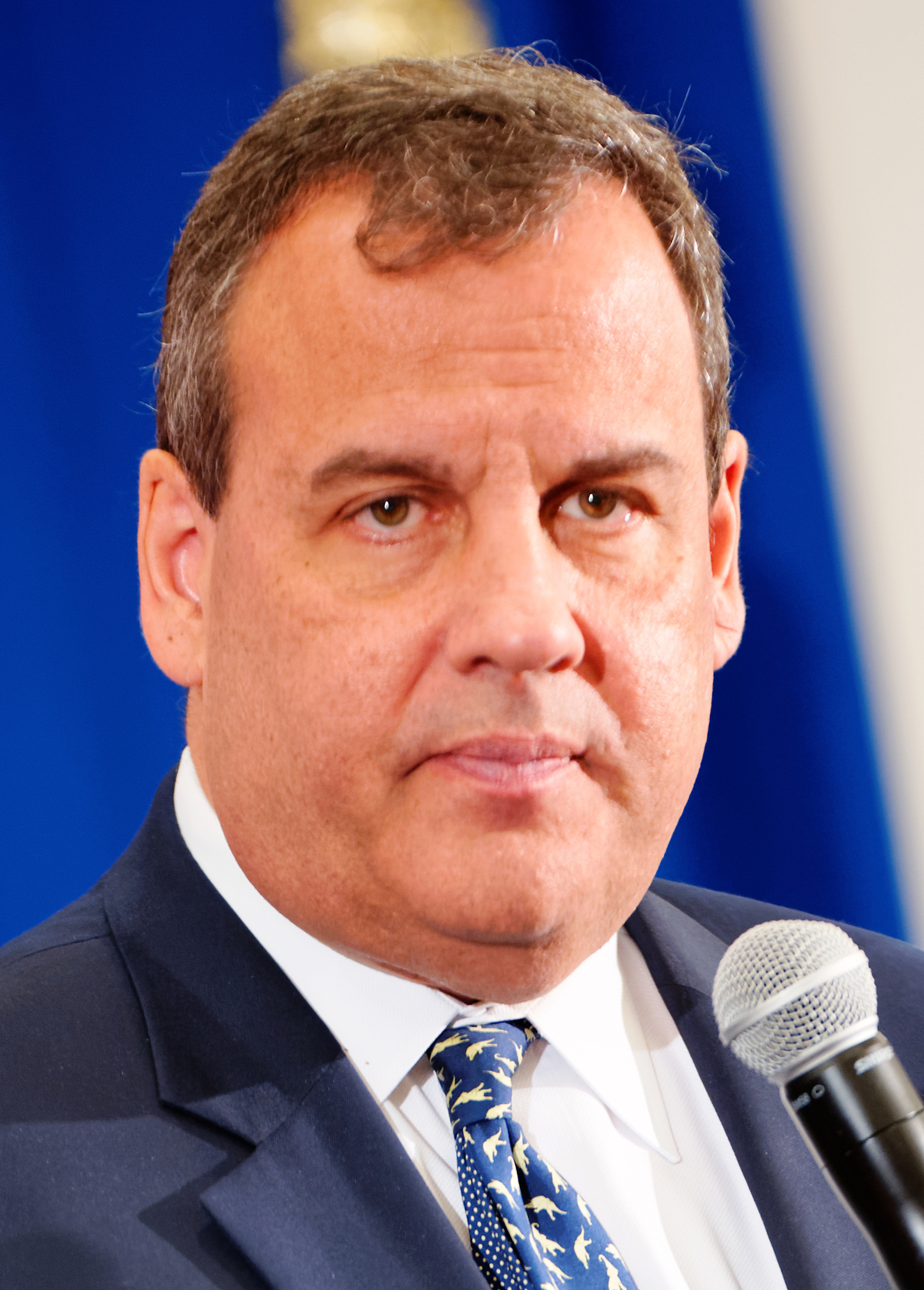
Chris Christie, former U.S. attorney and former Governor of New Jersey.

Prominent assistant US attorneys

- Samuel Alito - associate justice, U.S. Supreme Court
- Carolyn Arch - partner, Arch & Goodwin, Newark, N.J.
- Maryanne Trump Barry - U.S. circuit court judge, Third Circuit
- John Winslow Bissell - U.S. district court judge
- Matthew Boxer - comptroller, State of New Jersey
- Garrett Brown, Jr. - U.S. district court judge
- Renée Marie Bumb - U.S. district court judge
- Michael Chagares - U.S. circuit court judge, Third Circuit
- Michael Chertoff - Former secretary, Department of Homeland Security
- Stanley R. Chesler - U.S. district court judge
- Chris Christie - Former governor of New Jersey
- John Farmer Jr. - Former attorney general, State of New Jersey
- Joseph Greenaway - U.S. circuit court judge, Third Circuit
- Gurbir Grewal - Former Bergen County prosecutor and former attorney general of New Jersey
- Peter C. Harvey - Former attorney general, State of New Jersey
- Katharine Hayden - U.S. district court judge
- Noel Hillman - U.S. district court judge; Former chief, Public Integrity Section, U.S. Department of Justice
- Richard J. Hughes - Former governor of New Jersey; Former chief justice, New Jersey Supreme Court
- David Lat - blogger, Underneath their Robes and Above the Law
- William Martini - U.S. district court judge; Former congressman (NJ-8)
- Stuart Rabner - chief justice, New Jersey Supreme Court
- Jerome Simandle - U.S. district court judge
- Herbert Stern - former U.S. district court judge; former federal monitor, UMDNJ Medicaid fraud investigation
- Mikie Sherrill - Governor of New Jersey

== Officeholders ==
U.S. Attorney		Term started	Term ended	Appointed by
Richard Stockton		1789	1791	George Washington
Abraham Ogden		1791	1798	George Washington
Lucius Horatio Stockton		1798	1801	John Adams
Frederick Frelinghuysen	Frederick Frelinghuysen.	1801	1801	John Adams
George C. Maxwell		1801	1803	Thomas Jefferson
William S. Pennington		1803	1804	Thomas Jefferson
Joseph McIlvaine		1804	1824	Thomas Jefferson
Lucius Q.C. Elmer		1824	1829	James Monroe
Garret D. Wall		1829	1835	Andrew Jackson
James S. Green		1835	1850	Andrew Jackson
William Halstead		1850	1853	Millard Fillmore
Garret S. Cannon		1853	1861	Franklin Pierce
Anthony Q. Keasbey		1861	1886	Abraham Lincoln
Job H. Lippincott		1886	1887	Grover Cleveland
Samuel F. Bigelow		1887	1888	Grover Cleveland
George S. Duryee		1888	1890	Grover Cleveland
Henry S. White		1890	1894	Benjamin Harrison
John W. Beekman		1894	1896	Grover Cleveland
J. Kearney Rice		1896	1900	Grover Cleveland
David Ogden Watkins		1900	1903	William McKinley
Cortlandt Parker, Jr.		1903	1903	Theodore Roosevelt
John Beam Vreeland		1903	1913	Theodore Roosevelt
J. Warren Davis		1913	1916	Woodrow Wilson
Charles Francis Lynch		1916	1919	Woodrow Wilson
Joseph L. Bodine		1919	1920	Woodrow Wilson
Elmer H. Geran		1920	1922	Woodrow Wilson
Walter G. Winne		1922	1928	Warren Harding
Phillip Forman		1928	1932	Calvin Coolidge
Harlan Besson		1932	1935	Herbert Hoover
John J. Quinn		1935	1940	Franklin D. Roosevelt
William Francis Smith		1940	1941	Franklin D. Roosevelt
Charles M. Phillips		1941	1943	Franklin D. Roosevelt
Thorn Lord		1943	1945	Franklin D. Roosevelt
Edgar H. Rossbach		1945	1948	Harry Truman
Isaiah Matlack		1948	1948	Harry Truman
Alfred E. Modarelli		1948	1951	Harry Truman
Grover C. Richman, Jr.		1951	1953	Harry Truman
William F. Tompkins		1953	1954	Dwight D. Eisenhower
Raymond Del Tufo, Jr.		1954	1956	Dwight D. Eisenhower
Herman Scott		1956	1956	Dwight D. Eisenhower
Chester A. Weidenburner		1956	1961	Dwight D. Eisenhower
David M. Satz, Jr.		1961	1969	John F. Kennedy
Donald Horowitz		1969	1969	Lyndon B. Johnson
Frederick B. Lacey		1969	1971	Richard Nixon
Herbert J. Stern		1971	1974	Richard Nixon
Jonathan L. Goldstein		1974	1977	Richard Nixon
Robert J. Del Tufo		1977	1980	Jimmy Carter
William W. Robertson		1980	1981	Jimmy Carter
W. Hunt Dumont		1981	1985	Ronald Reagan
Thomas W. Greelish		1985	1987	Ronald Reagan
Samuel Alito	Sam Alito.	December 10, 1987	April 30, 1990	Ronald Reagan
Michael Chertoff	Michael Chertoff.	1990	1994	George H. W. Bush
Faith S. Hochberg		1994	1999	Bill Clinton
Robert J. Cleary		November 16, 1999	January 17, 2002	Bill Clinton
Chris Christie	Chris Christie	January 17, 2002	December 1, 2008	George W. Bush
Ralph J. Marra Jr. (acting)		December 1, 2008	October 14, 2009	George W. Bush
Paul J. Fishman		October 14, 2009	March 10, 2017	Barack Obama
William E. Fitzpatrick (acting)		March 10, 2017	January 5, 2018	Donald Trump
Craig Carpenito		January 5, 2018	January 5, 2021	Donald Trump
Rachael A. Honig (acting)		January 6, 2021	December 15, 2021	Donald Trump
Rachael A. Honig (acting)		January 6, 2021	December 15, 2021	Joe Biden
Philip R. Sellinger		December 16, 2021	January 8, 2025	Joe Biden
Vikas Khanna (acting)	hindui harom	January 9, 2025	March 3, 2025	Joe Biden
John Giordano (interim)		March 3, 2025	March 27, 2025	Donald Trump
Alina Habba (interim)		March 28, 2025	July 24, 2025	Donald Trump
Alina Habba (acting)		July 24, 2025	December 8, 2025 (Note: Resignation followed a ruling by the United States Court of Appeals for the Third Circuit that her appointment was unlawful)	Donald Trump
Robert Frazer		March 23, 2026	present	U.S. Dist. Ct. for Dist. of N.J.
