= New Jersey State Bar Association =

The New Jersey State Bar Association
- Type: Legal Society
- Headquarters: New Brunswick, NJ
- Location: United States
- Members: 18,000+ in 2016
- Website: http://www.njsba.com

The New Jersey State Bar Association (NJSBA) is a voluntary bar association for the state of New Jersey.

== History ==
In June 1899, 74 attorneys launched NJSBA in Atlantic City; annual dues were $5.00. Within the next decade, the Canon of Ethics was adopted by the NJSBA and the Committee on Law Reform, aimed at improving the practice of law and administration of justice in NJ, was formed. Over the years, NJSBA supported the establishment of a Judicial Council to study the problem of an increase in court cases, the replacement of the New Jersey Court of Errors and Appeals with a Supreme Court, and the repeal of Prohibition. In 1945, NJSBA developed refresher courses for attorneys returning from service in World War II, the forerunner of today's practice of Continuing Legal Education. In the 1980s, paralegals, law office administrators and other non-lawyers were welcomed into NJSBA as associate members.

Today, the association is home to over 18,000 members and is the largest group of lawyers, judges and other professionals in the legal field. It holds hundreds of educational seminars each year, large conferences, as well as has an extensive amicus and legislative affairs programs to advocate on behalf of the profession.

== Activities ==
NJSBA supports over 80 practice-oriented sections, committees and divisions to support a diverse spectrum of law practice. NJSBA is the publisher of New Jersey Lawyer. It shares New Jersey Law Center with the New Jersey State Bar Foundation, the association's educational division, the Institute for Continuing Legal Education, the IOLTA Fund of the Bar of New Jersey, the New Jersey Lawyers Assistance Program and the New Jersey Commission on Professionalism.
