= Fair and Clean Elections =

Fair and Clean Elections was a pilot project in the U.S. State of New Jersey for public financing of candidates to the New Jersey Senate and New Jersey General Assembly in 2005 and 2007. During the 2007 election cycle, the program took place in Districts 14‚ 24 and 37. This was an extension of the pilot in two legislative districts for General Assembly candidates in the 2005 general election, which included the 6th district. The pilot project's goals were "to improve the unfavorable opinion that many residents of this State have toward the political process‚ to strengthen the integrity of that process and to improve access to it by many individuals and groups who have traditionally not been part of it." The project was based on similar programs in Arizona and Maine, with the goal of providing all candidates with equal financial resources.

Candidates seeking to participate in the 2007 pilot were required to raise between 400 and 800 separate contributions of $10 each from registered voters within the district. Candidates who obtained these contributions and refused to accept contributions from other sources were eligible to participate in the program.

The program was abandoned in 2008 after criticism that it had failed to achieve its goals, and concern about the constitutionality of certain key provisions of the law.
