= 212th New Jersey Legislature =

←	211th Legislature	213th Legislature	→
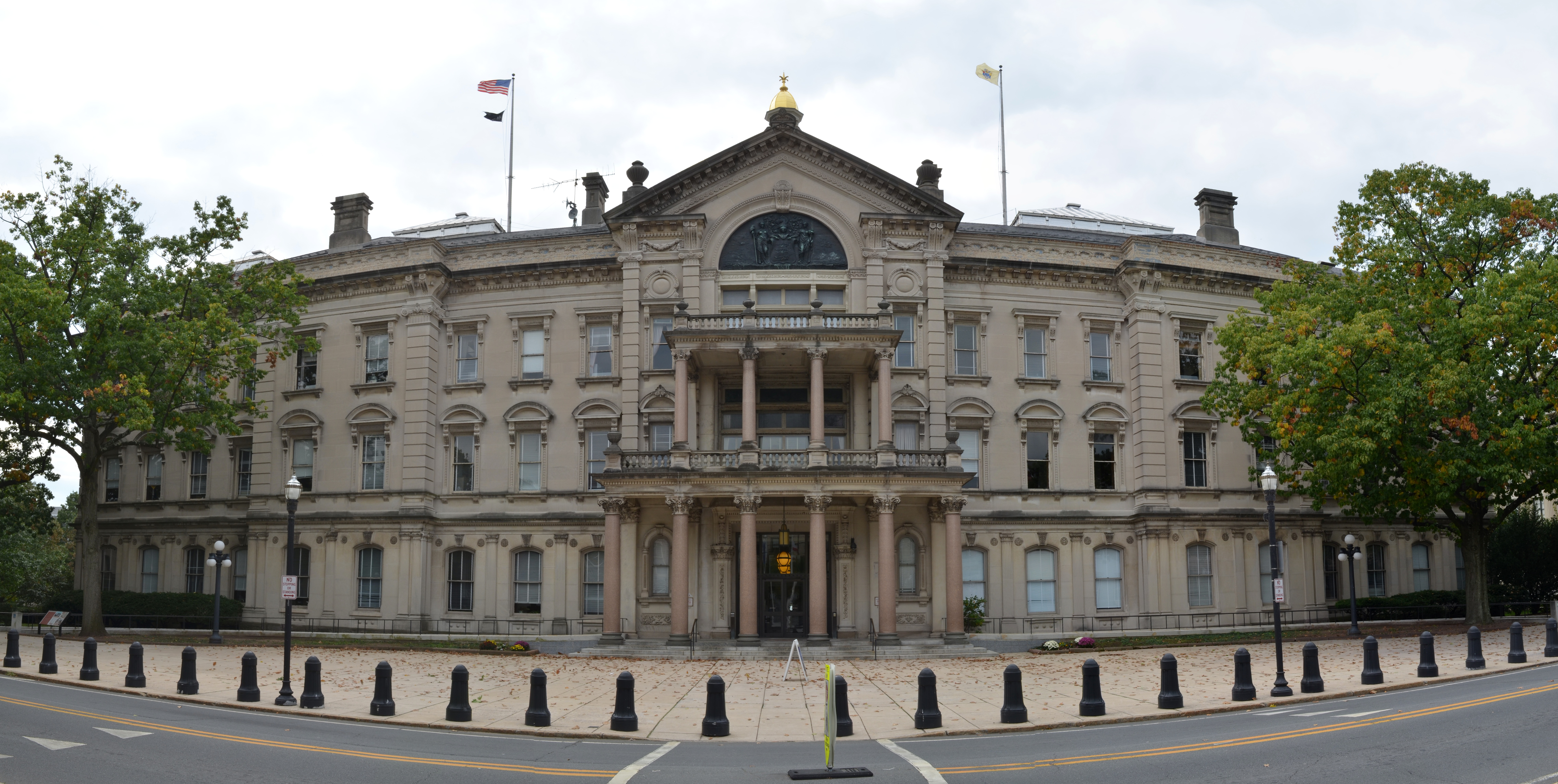
- New Jersey State House north panorama, 2012

Overview
- Legislative body: New Jersey Legislature
- Jurisdiction: New Jersey, United States
- Term: January 10, 2006 – January 10, 2008

New Jersey Senate
- Members: 40
- President: Richard Codey
- Minority Leader: Leonard Lance
- Party control: Democratic Party

New Jersey General Assembly
- Members: 80
- Speaker: Joseph J. Roberts
- Minority Leader: Alex DeCroce
- Party control: Democratic Party

The following is the roster and leadership of the 212th Legislature. The term began on January 10, 2006, and ended on January 10, 2008. Members were elected in the 2005 New Jersey General Assembly election.

== Leadership ==
Members of the Assembly's leadership are:

=== Democratic leadership ===
- Speaker: Joseph J. Roberts (District 5)
- Majority Leader: Bonnie Watson Coleman (District 15)
- Speaker Pro Tempore: Wilfredo Caraballo (District 29)
- Majority Conference Leader: Joan M. Quigley (District 32)
- Deputy Speakers:
  - John J. Burzichelli (District 3)
  - Upendra J. Chivukula (District 17)
  - Neil M. Cohen (District 20)
  - Jack Conners (District 7)
  - Linda R. Greenstein District 14)
  - Linda Stender (District 22)
  - John S. Wisniewski (District 19)
- Deputy Majority Leader: Joseph Cryan (District 20)
- Assistant Majority Leaders:
  - Nilsa Cruz-Perez (District 5)
  - Reed Gusciora (District 15)
  - John F. McKeon (District 27)
  - Sheila Y. Oliver (District 34)
  - Jeff Van Drew (District 1)
- Deputy Speaker Pro Tempore: Jerry Green (District 22)
- Deputy Conference Leader: William D. Payne (District 29)
- Parliamentarian: Patrick J. Diegnan (District 18)
- Majority Whip: (vacant)
- Deputy Majority Whip: Vincent Prieto (District 32)
- Assistant Majority Whip: Douglas H. Fisher (District 3)
- Appropriations Committee Chair: Nellie Pou (District 35)
- Budget Committee Chair: Louis Greenwald (District 6)

=== Republican leadership ===
- Republican Leader: Alex DeCroce (District 26)
- Republican Conference Leader: Peter J. Biondi (District 16)
- Republican Whip: Francis J. Blee (District 2)
- Deputy Conference Leader: Eric Munoz (District 21)
- Policy Committee Chair: Steve Corodemus (District 11)
- Deputy Minority Leader: Kevin J. O'Toole (District 40)
- Assistant Minority Leaders:
  - David W. Wolfe (District 10)
  - Alison Littell McHose (District 24)
- Assistant Minority Whips:
  - Jon Bramnick (District 21)
  - Sean T. Kean (District 11)
- Budget Officer: Joseph R. Malone (District 30)
- Appropriations Officer: Joseph Pennacchio (District 26)
- Parliamentarian: Richard A. Merkt (District 25)

== Members of the General Assembly (by District) ==
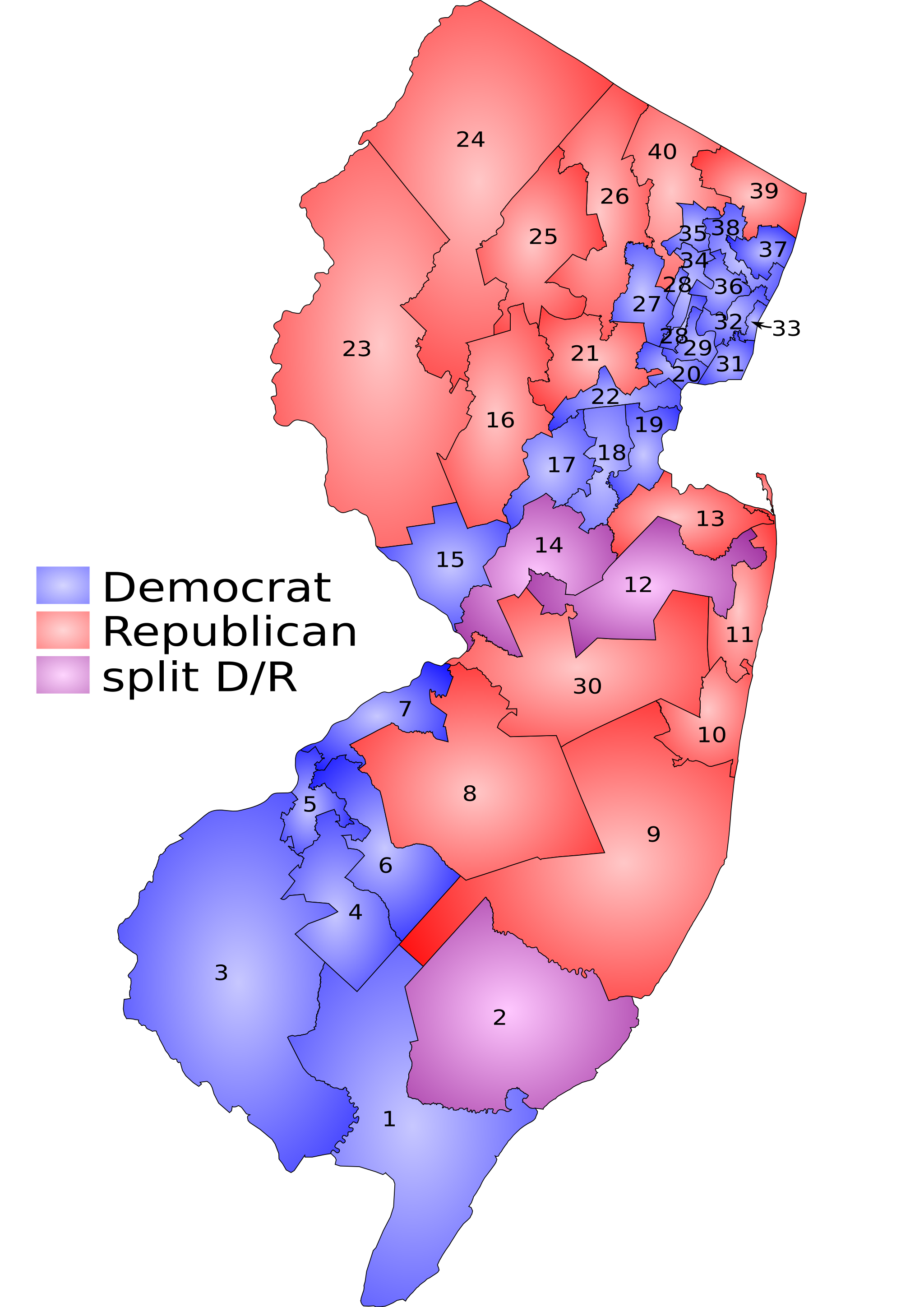
District map (2001 redistricting) colored by 2006 to 2007 term representative party

Composition at Election
Affiliation	Members
Democratic Party	49
Republican Party	31
Total	80

- District 1: Nelson Albano (D, Vineland) and Matt Milam (D, Dennis Township)
- District 2: Francis J. Blee (R, Absecon) and Jim Whelan (D, Atlantic City)
- District 3: John J. Burzichelli (D, Paulsboro) and Douglas H. Fisher (D, Bridgeton)
- District 4: Sandra Love (D, Blackwood) and Paul D. Moriarty (D, Washington Township, Gloucester County)
- District 5: Nilsa Cruz-Perez (D, Camden) and Joseph J. Roberts (D, Brooklawn)
- District 6: Louis Greenwald (D, Voorhees) and Pamela Rosen Lampitt (D, Cherry Hill)
- District 7: Herb Conaway (D, Delanco) and Jack Conners (D, Pennsauken)
- District 8: Francis L. Bodine (D, Moorestown Township) and Larry Chatzidakis (R, Mount Laurel)
- District 9: Christopher J. Connors (R, Forked River) and Brian E. Rumpf (R, Little Egg Harbor)
- District 10: James W. Holzapfel (R, Toms River) and David W. Wolfe (R, Brick)
- District 11: Steve Corodemus (R, Atlantic Highlands) and Sean T. Kean (R, Wall Township)
- District 12: Jennifer Beck (R, Red Bank) and
- District 13: Amy Handlin (R, Middletown) and Samuel D. Thompson (R, Old Bridge)
- District 14: Wayne DeAngelo (D, Hamilton) and Linda R. Greenstein (D, Plainsboro)
- District 15: Reed Gusciora (D, Princeton) and Bonnie Watson Coleman (D, Ewing)
- District 16: Christopher Bateman (R, Neshanic Station) and Peter J. Biondi (R, Hillsborough)
- District 17: Upendra J. Chivukula (D, Somerset) and Joseph V. Egan (D, New Brunswick)
- District 18: Peter J. Barnes III (D, Edison) and Patrick J. Diegnan (D, South Plainfield)
- District 19: Joseph Vas (D, Perth Amboy) and John S. Wisniewski (D, Sayreville)
- District 20: Neil M. Cohen (D, Roselle) and Joseph Cryan (D, Union)
- District 21: Jon Bramnick (R, Westfield) and Eric Munoz (R, Summit)
- District 22: Jerry Green (D, Plainfield) and Linda Stender (D, Fanwood)
- District 23: Michael J. Doherty (R, Oxford) and Marcia A. Karrow (R, Raritan Township)
- District 24: Guy R. Gregg (R, Washington Township, Morris County) and Alison Littell McHose (R, Sparta)
- District 25: Michael Patrick Carroll (R, Morris Township) and Richard A. Merkt (R, Mendham Township)
- District 26: Alex DeCroce (R, Morris Plains) and Joseph Pennacchio (R, Pine Brook)
- District 27: Mila Jasey (D, South Orange) and John F. McKeon (D, West Orange)
- District 28: Ralph R. Caputo (D, Belleville) and Cleopatra Tucker (D, Newark).
- District 29: L. Grace Spencer (D, Newark) and Alberto Coutinho (D, Newark)
- District 30: Ronald S. Dancer (R, New Egypt) and Joseph R. Malone (R, Bordentown)
- District 31: L. Harvey Smith (D, Jersey City) and Anthony Chiappone (D, Jersey City)
- District 32: Vincent Prieto (D, Secaucus) and Joan M. Quigley (D, Jersey City)
- District 33: Caridad Rodriguez (D, West New York) and Ruben Ramos (D, Hoboken)
- District 34: Thomas P. Giblin (D, Montclair) and Sheila Y. Oliver (D, East Orange)
- District 35: Nellie Pou (D, North Haledon) and Elease Evans (D, Paterson, 2007
- District 36: Frederick Scalera (D, Nutley) and Gary Schaer (D, Passaic)
- District 37: Gordon M. Johnson (D, Englewood) and Valerie Huttle (D, Englewood)
- District 38: Connie Wagner (D, Paramus) and Joan Voss (D, Fort Lee)
- District 39: John E. Rooney (R, Northvale) and Charlotte Vandervalk (R, Hillsdale)
- District 40: Kevin J. O'Toole (R, Cedar Grove) and David C. Russo (R, Ridgewood)

== See also ==
- List of New Jersey state legislatures

== Notes ==
- Truitt replaced Evelyn Williams, who stepped down before assuming office in the 2006-2008 term.
- Evans replaced Rev. Alfred E. Steele, who resigned in September, 2007.
- Jasey replaced Mims Hackett, who resigned in September, 2007.
- Vega replaced Albio Sires, who resigned in November, 2006 after election to the U.S. House of Representatives.
