= New Jersey General Assembly, 2010–2012 term =

214th New Jersey Legislature
←	213th Legislature	215th Legislature	→
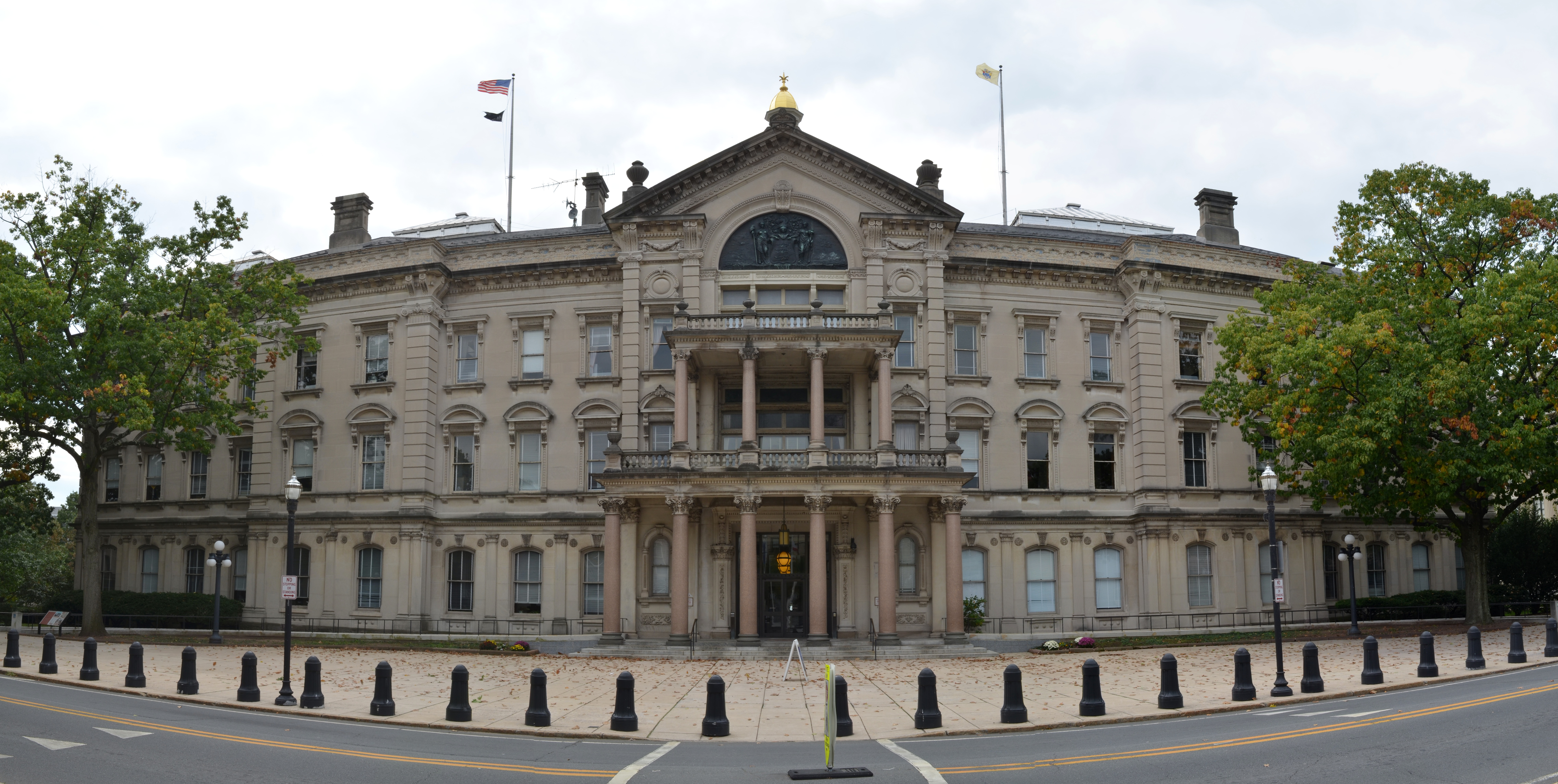
- New Jersey State House north panorama, 2012

Overview
- Legislative body: New Jersey Legislature
- Jurisdiction: New Jersey, United States
- Term: January 12, 2010 – January 12, 2012

New Jersey Senate
- Members: 40
- President: Richard Codey
- Minority Leader: Thomas Kean Jr.
- Party control: Democratic Party

New Jersey General Assembly
- Members: 80
- Speaker: Joseph J. Roberts
- Minority Leader: Alex DeCroce
- Party control: Democratic Party

The New Jersey General Assembly is the lower house of the New Jersey Legislature. The following is the roster and leadership positions for the 2010–2012 term, which was the 214th legislature. The term began on January 12, 2010, and ended on January 12, 2012. Members were elected in the 2009 New Jersey General Assembly election.

== Leadership ==
Members of the Assembly's leadership are:

=== Democratic leadership ===
Position	Representative	District
Speaker of the General Assembly	Sheila Y. Oliver	34
Speaker Pro Tempore	Jerry Green	22
Majority Leader	Joseph Cryan	20
Deputy Speaker of the Assembly	John J. Burzichelli	3
Deputy Speaker of the Assembly	Upendra J. Chivukula	17
Deputy Speaker of the Assembly	Jack Conners	7
Deputy Speaker of the Assembly	Patrick J. Diegnan	18
Deputy Speaker of the Assembly	Linda R. Greenstein	14
Deputy Speaker of the Assembly	John F. McKeon	27
Deputy Speaker of the Assembly	Frederick Scalera	36
Deputy Speaker of the Assembly	L. Grace Spencer	29
Deputy Speaker of the Assembly	John S. Wisniewski	19
Deputy Majority Leader	Joseph V. Egan	17
Deputy Majority Leader	Thomas P. Giblin	34
Deputy Majority Leader	Reed Gusciora	15
Deputy Majority Leader	Caridad Rodriguez	33
Deputy Majority Leader	Joan Voss	38
Deputy Speaker Pro Tempore	Wayne DeAngelo	4
Majority Conference Leader	Joan M. Quigley	32
Deputy Majority Conference Leader	Gordon M. Johnson	37
Parliamentarian	Patrick J. Diegnan	18
Majority Whip	Peter J. Barnes III	18
Deputy Majority Whip	Vincent Prieto	32

=== Republican leadership ===
Position	Representative	District
Minority Leader	Alex DeCroce	26
Minority Conference Leader	Jon Bramnick	21
Minority Whip	David Rible	11
Deputy Minority Conference Leader	Scott Rumana	40
Deputy Minority Leader	Amy Handlin	13
Deputy Minority Leader	Vincent J. Polistina	2
Deputy Minority Leader	David W. Wolfe	10
Assistant Minority Leader	Dawn Marie Addiego	8
Assistant Minority Leader	Denise Coyle	16
Assistant Minority Whip	John F. Amodeo	2
Assistant Minority Whip	Gary R. Chiusano	24
Parliamentarian	James W. Holzapfel	10

== Members of the General Assembly (by district) ==
Two Democratic members Two Republican members One Democrat, one Republican

Affiliation	Members
Democratic Party	47
Republican Party	33
Total	80

- District 1: Nelson Albano (D, Vineland) and Matthew W. Milam (D, Vineland)
- District 2: John F. Amodeo (R, Margate) and Vincent J. Polistina (R, Egg Harbor Township)
- District 3: John J. Burzichelli (D, Paulsboro) and Celeste Riley (D, Bridgeton)
- District 4: Domenick DiCicco (R), Franklin Township) and Paul D. Moriarty (D, Washington Township, Gloucester County)
- District 5: Gilbert Wilson (D, Camden) and Angel Fuentes (D, Camden)
- District 6: Louis Greenwald (D, Voorhees) and Pamela Rosen Lampitt (D, Cherry Hill Township)
- District 7: Herb Conaway (D, Delanco) and Troy Singleton (D, Medford)
- District 8: Gerry Nardello (R, Medford) and Scott Rudder (R, Medford)
- District 9: Brian E. Rumpf (R, Little Egg Harbor) and DiAnne Gove (R, Long Beach Township)
- District 10: James W. Holzapfel (R, Toms River) and David W. Wolfe (R, Brick)
- District 11: Mary Pat Angelini (R, Ocean Township) and Dave Rible (R, Wall Township)
- District 12: Caroline Casagrande (R, Colts Neck Township) and Declan O'Scanlon (R, Little Silver)
- District 13: Amy Handlin (R, Middletown) and Samuel D. Thompson (R, Old Bridge Township)
- District 14: Wayne DeAngelo (D, Hamilton) and Daniel R. Benson (D, Hamilton)
- District 15: Reed Gusciora (D, Princeton) and Bonnie Watson Coleman (D, Ewing)
- District 16: Jack M. Ciattarelli (R, Hillsborough) and Denise Coyle (R Bernards)
- District 17: Upendra J. Chivukula (D, Somerset) and Joseph V. Egan (D, New Brunswick)
- District 18: Peter J. Barnes III (D, Edison) and Patrick J. Diegnan (D, South Plainfield)
- District 19: Craig Coughlin (D, Fords) and John S. Wisniewski (D, Sayreville)
- District 20: Joseph Cryan (D, Union) and Annette Quijano (D, Elizabeth)
- District 21: Jon Bramnick (R, Westfield) and Nancy Munoz (R, Summit)
- District 22: Jerry Green (D, Plainfield) and Linda Stender (D, Fanwood)
- District 23: John DiMaio (R, Hackettstown) and Erik Peterson (R, Franklin Township)
- District 24: Gary R. Chiusano (R, Franklin, New Jersey) and Alison Littell McHose (R, Sparta Township)
- District 25: Michael Patrick Carroll (R, Morris Township) and Tony Bucco (R, Boonton)
- District 26: Alex DeCroce (R, Morris Plains) and Jay Webber (R, Morris Plains)
- District 27: Mila Jasey (D, South Orange) and John F. McKeon (D, West Orange)
- District 28: Ralph R. Caputo (D, Belleville) and Cleopatra Tucker (D, Newark)
- District 29: Alberto Coutinho (D, Newark) and L. Grace Spencer (D, Newark)
- District 30: Ronald S. Dancer (R, New Egypt) and Joseph R. Malone (R, Bordentown)
- District 31: Anthony Chiappone (D, Bayonne) and Charles Mainor (D, Jersey City)
- District 32: Vincent Prieto (D, Secaucus) and Joan M. Quigley (D, Jersey City)
- District 33: Ruben J. Ramos (D, Hoboken) and VACANT
- District 34: Thomas P. Giblin (D, Montclair) and Sheila Y. Oliver (D, East Orange)
- District 35: Elease Evans (D, Paterson) and Nellie Pou (D, North Haledon)
- District 36: Gary Schaer (D, Passaic) and Kevin J. Ryan (D, Nutley)
- District 37: Valerie Huttle (D, Englewood) and Gordon M. Johnson (D, Englewood)
- District 38: Joan Voss (D, Fort Lee) and Connie Wagner (D, Paramus)
- District 39: Bob Schroeder (R, Washington Township) and Charlotte Vandervalk (R, Hillsdale)
- District 40: Scott Rumana (R, Wayne) and David C. Russo (R, Ridgewood)

== See also ==
- List of New Jersey state legislatures
