= New Jersey General Assembly, 2004–2006 term =

211th New Jersey Legislature
| ← | 210th Legislature | 212th Legislature | → |
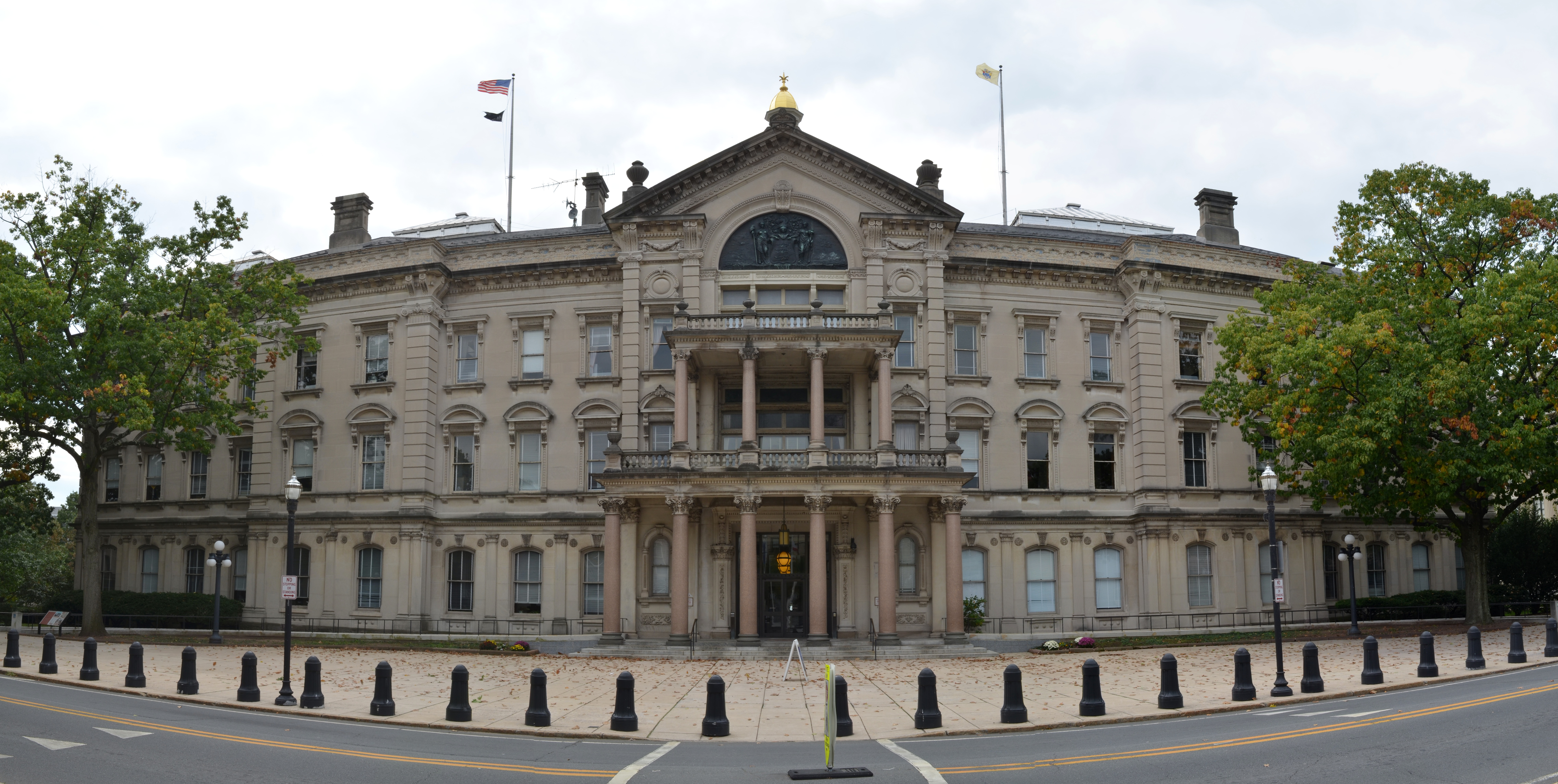
- New Jersey State House north panorama, 2012

Overview
- Legislative body: New Jersey Legislature
- Jurisdiction: New Jersey, United States
- Term: January 12, 2004 – January 10, 2006

New Jersey Senate
- Members: 40
- President: Richard Codey
- Minority Leader: Leonard Lance
- Party control: Democratic Party

New Jersey General Assembly
- Members: 80
- Speaker: Albio Sires
- Minority Leader: Alex DeCroce
- Party control: Democratic Party

The New Jersey General Assembly is the lower house of the New Jersey Legislature. The following is the roster and leadership positions for the 2004-2006 term, which was the 211th Legislature. The term began on January 12, 2004, and ended on January 10, 2006. Members were elected in the 2003 New Jersey General Assembly election.

== Leadership ==
Speaker: Albio Sires (District 33)

Majority Leader: Joseph J. Roberts (District 5)

Speaker Pro Tempore: Donald Kofi Tucker (District 28)

Majority Conference Leader: Loretta Weinberg (District 37)

Deputy Speaker Pro Tempore: Jerry Green (District 22)

Deputy Speakers: Herb Conaway (District 7), Nellie Pou (District 35), Joan M. Quigley (District 32), Alfred E. Steele (District 35), John S. Wisniewski (District 19)

Deputy Majority Leader: Neil M. Cohen (District 20)

Assistant Majority Leaders: John J. Burzichelli (District 3); Nilsa Cruz-Perez (District 5); Joseph Cryan (District 20); Linda R. Greenstein (District 14)

Parliamentarian: Wilfredo Caraballo (District 29)

Deputy Majority Conference Leader: William D. Payne (District 29)

Majority Whip: Peter J. Barnes (District 18)

Assistant Majority Whips: John F. McKeon (District 27); Robert J. Smith II (District 4)

Minority Leader: Alex DeCroce (District 26)

Minority Conference Leader: Guy R. Gregg (District 24)

Minority Whip: Francis J. Blee (District 2)

Deputy Minority Leaders: Kevin J. O'Toole (District 40); Steve Corodemus (District 11)

Assistant Minority Leaders: Christopher Bateman (District 16); Samuel D. Thompson (District 13); David W. Wolfe (District 10)

Assistant Minority Whips: Francis L. Bodine (District 8); Sean T. Kean (District 11); Alison Littell McHose (District 24)

Policy Chair: Steve Corodemus (District 11)

Parliamentarian: Michael Patrick Carroll (District 25)

Assistant Parliamentarian: Bill Baroni (District 14)

== Members of the New Jersey General Assembly (by District) ==
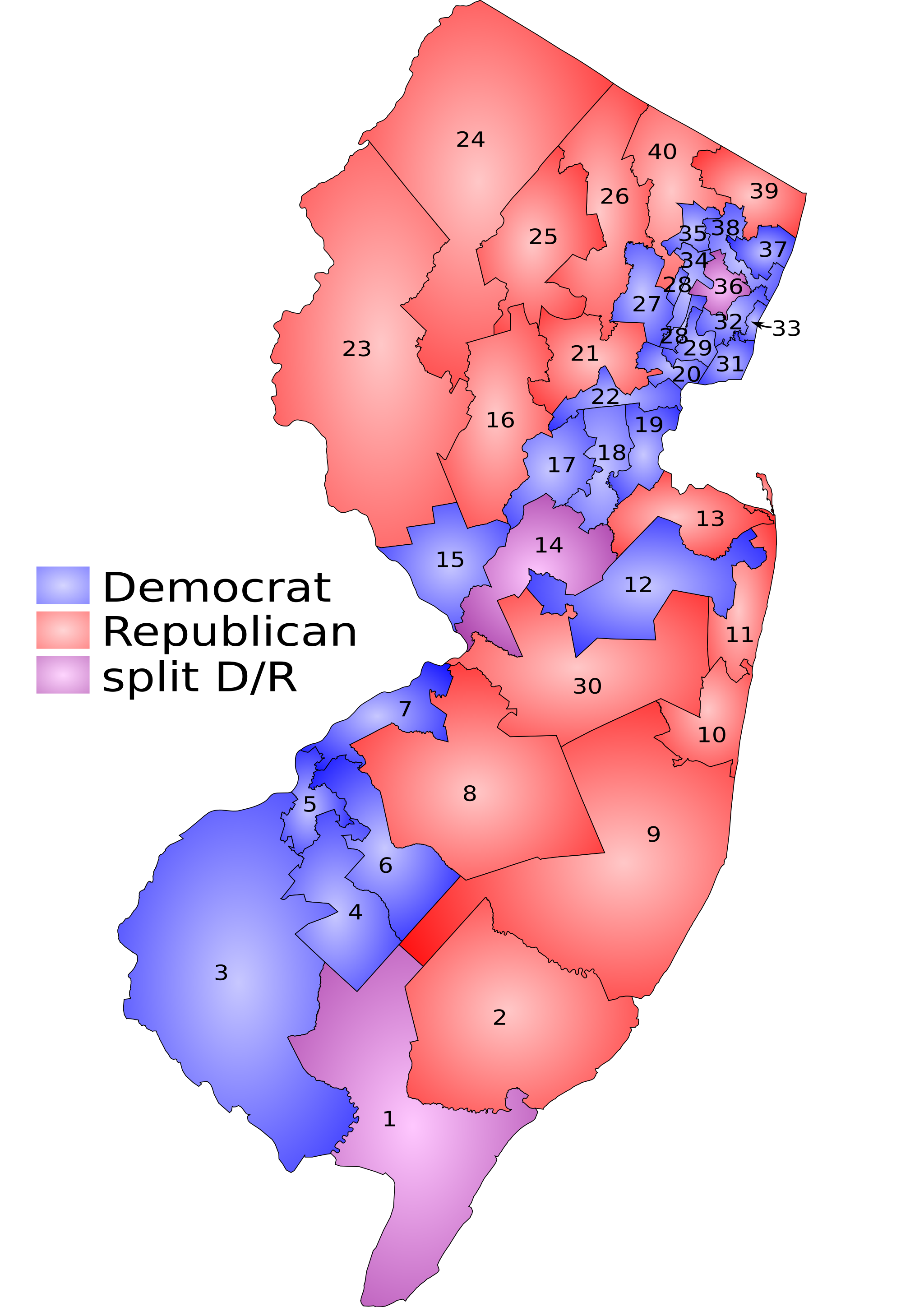
District map (2001 redistricting) colored by 2004 to 2005 term representative party

Composition at election
| Affiliation | Members |
|---|---|
| Democratic Party | 47 |
| Republican Party | 33 |
| Total | 80 |

- District 1: John C. Gibson (R, Vineland) and Jeff Van Drew (D, Ocean City)
- District 2: Francis J. Blee (R, Absecon) and Kirk W. Conover (R, Absecon)
- District 3: John J. Burzichelli (D, Thorofare) and Douglas H. Fisher (D, Thorofare)
- District 4: David R. Mayer (D, Blackwood) and Robert J. Smith II (D, Turnersville)
- District 5: Nilsa Cruz-Perez (D, Camden) and Joseph J. Roberts (D, Brooklawn)
- District 6: Louis Greenwald (D, Voorhees) and Mary Previte (D, Haddonfield)
- District 7: Herb Conaway (D, Delran) and Jack Conners (D, Delran)
- District 8: Francis L. Bodine (R, Mount Laurel) and Larry Chatzidakis (R, Mount Laurel)
- District 9: Christopher J. Connors (R, Forked River) and Brian E. Rumpf (R, Forked River)
- District 10: James W. Holzapfel (R, Brick) and David W. Wolfe (R, Brick)
- District 11: Steve Corodemus (R, Atlantic Highlands) and Sean T. Kean (R, Wall Township)
- District 12: Robert Lewis Morgan (D, Red Bank) and Michael J. Panter (D, Red Bank)
- District 13: Joseph Azzolina (R, Middletown) and Samuel D. Thompson (R, Matawan)
- District 14: Bill Baroni (R, Hamilton) and Linda R. Greenstein (R, Monroe)
- District 15: Reed Gusciora (D, Trenton) and Bonnie Watson Coleman (D, Trenton)
- District 16: Christopher Bateman (R, Somerville) and Peter J. Biondi (R, Somerville)
- District 17: Upendra J. Chivukula (D, Somerset) and Joseph V. Egan (D, New Brunswick)
- District 18: Peter J. Barnes (D, Edison) and Patrick J. Diegnan (D, South Plainfield)
- District 19: Joseph Vas (D, Perth Amboy) and John S. Wisniewski (D, Parlin)
- District 20: Neil M. Cohen (D, Union) and Joseph Cryan (D, Union)
- District 21: Jon Bramnick (R, Westfield) and Eric Munoz (R, Summit)
- District 22: Jerry Green (D, Plainfield) and Linda Stender (D, Scotch Plains)
- District 23: Michael J. Doherty (R, Washington) and Connie Myers (R, Milford)
- District 24: Guy R. Gregg (R, Flanders) and Alison Littell McHose (R, Sparta)
- District 25: Michael Patrick Carroll (R, Morristown) and Richard A. Merkt (R, Randolph)
- District 26: Alex DeCroce (R, Morris Plains) and Joseph Pennacchio (R, Morris Plains)
- District 27: Mims Hackett (D, South Orange) and John F. McKeon (D, South Orange)
- District 28: Craig A. Stanley (D, Irvington) and Donald Kofi Tucker (D, Newark). Tucker died on October 17, 2005, and his seat was not filled until the November 2006 election.
- District 29: Wilfredo Caraballo (D, Newark) and William D. Payne (D, Newark)
- District 30: Ronald S. Dancer (R, Jackson Township) and Joseph R. Malone (R, Bordentown)
- District 31: Anthony Chiappone (D, Bayonne) and Louis Manzo (D, Jersey City)
- District 32: Vincent Prieto (D, Jersey City) and Joan M. Quigley (D, Secaucus)
- District 33: Albio Sires (D, West New York) and Brian P. Stack (D, Union City)
- District 34: Peter C. Eagler (D, Clifton) and Sheila Y. Oliver (D, East Orange)
- District 35: Nellie Pou (D, Paterson) and Alfred E. Steele (D, Paterson)
- District 36: Paul DiGaetano (R, Rutherford) and Frederick Scalera (D, Nutley)
- District 37: Gordon M. Johnson (D, Englewood) and Loretta Weinberg (D, Teaneck).
- District 38: Robert M. Gordon (D, Fair Lawn) and Joan Voss (D, Fort Lee)
- District 39: John E. Rooney (R, Emerson) and Charlotte Vandervalk (R, Westwood)
- District 40: Kevin J. O'Toole (R, Wayne) and David C. Russo (R, Midland Park)

== See also ==
- List of New Jersey state legislatures
