= New Jersey General Assembly, 2008–2010 term =

213th New Jersey Legislature
←	212th Legislature	214th Legislature	→
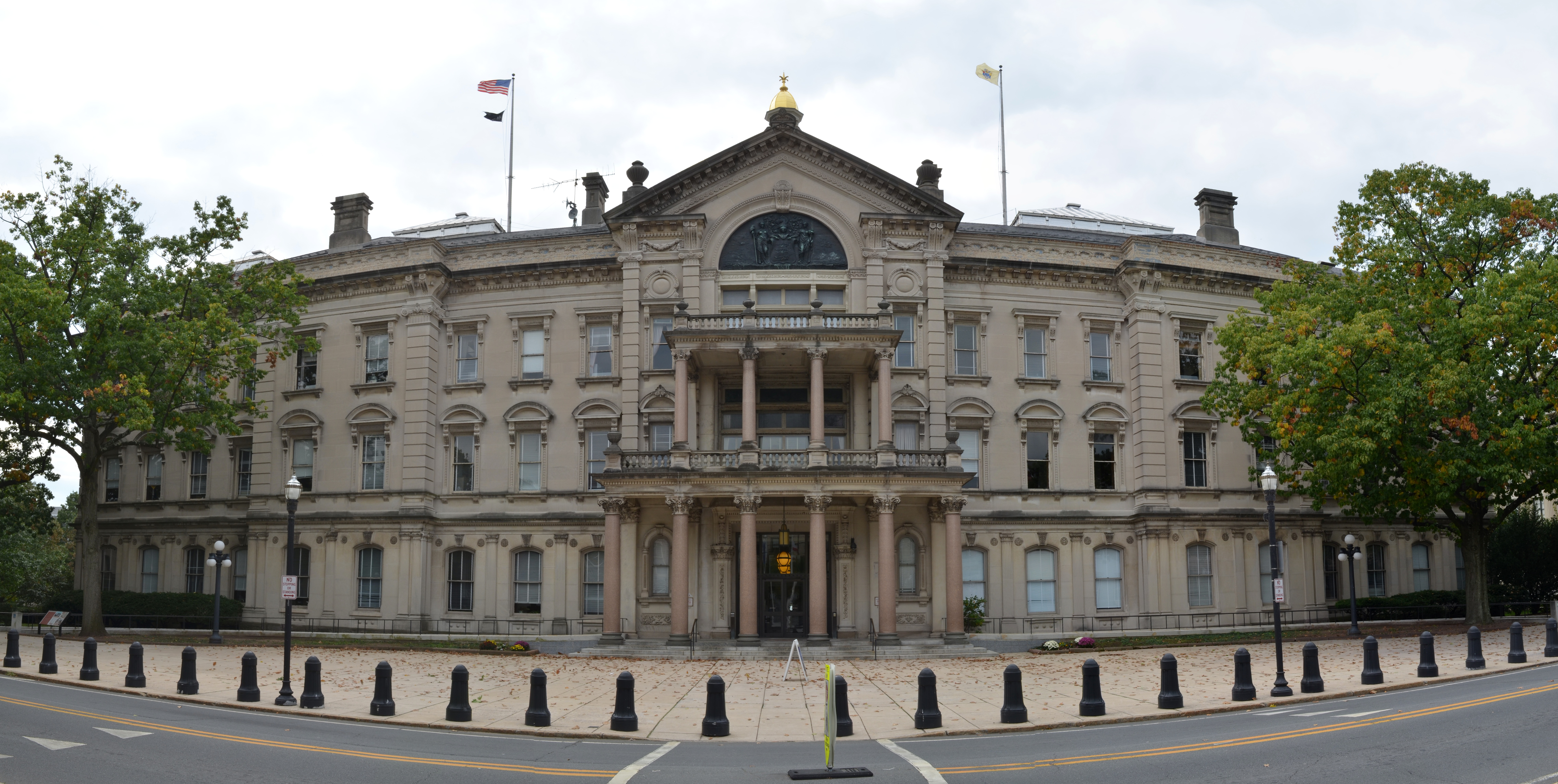
- New Jersey State House north panorama, 2012

Overview
- Legislative body: New Jersey Legislature
- Jurisdiction: New Jersey, United States
- Term: January 10, 2008 – January 10, 2010

New Jersey Senate
- Members: 40
- President: Richard Codey
- Minority Leader: Thomas Kean Jr.
- Party control: Democratic Party

New Jersey General Assembly
- Members: 80
- Speaker: Joseph J. Roberts
- Minority Leader: Alex DeCroce
- Party control: Democratic Party

The New Jersey General Assembly is the lower house of the New Jersey Legislature. The following is the roster and leadership positions for the 2008–2010 term, which was the 213th legislature. The term began on January 10, 2008, and ended on January 10, 2010. Members were elected in the 2007 New Jersey General Assembly election.

== Leadership ==
Members of the Assembly's leadership are:

=== Democratic leadership ===
- Assembly Speaker: Joseph J. Roberts (District 5)
- Majority Leader: Bonnie Watson Coleman (District 15)
- Speaker Pro Tempore: Jerry Green (District 22)
- Majority Conference Leader: Joan M. Quigley (District 32)
- Deputy Speakers
  - John J. Burzichelli (District 3)
  - Upendra J. Chivukula (District 17)
  - Jack Conners (District 7)
  - Patrick J. Diegnan (District 18)
  - Linda R. Greenstein (District 14)
  - Frederick Scalera (District 36)
  - Linda Stender (District 22)
  - John S. Wisniewski (District 19)
- Deputy Majority Leaders
  - Nilsa Cruz-Perez (District 5)
  - Joseph Cryan (District 20)
  - Joseph V. Egan (District 17)
  - Thomas P. Giblin (District 34)
  - Reed Gusciora (District 15)
  - Joseph Vas (District 19)
- Deputy Speaker Pro Tempore: Sheila Y. Oliver (District 34)
- Deputy Conference Leader: Joan Voss (District 38)
- Parliamentarian: Patrick J. Diegnan (District 18)
- Majority Whip: John F. McKeon (District 27)
- Deputy Majority Whips
  - Douglas H. Fisher (District 3)
  - Vincent Prieto (District 32)
- Appropriations Committee Chair: Nellie Pou (District 35)
- Budget Committee Chair: Louis Greenwald (District 6)

=== Republican leadership ===
- Republican Leader: Alex DeCroce (District 26)
- Republican Conference Leader: Peter Biondi (District 16)
- Republican Whip: Jon Bramnick (District 21)
- Republican Budget Officer: Joseph R. Malone (District 30)
- Deputy Republican Leaders:
  - Amy Handlin (District 13)
  - David W. Wolfe (District 10)
- Deputy Conference Leaders:
  - Alison Littell McHose (District 24)
  - currently vacant due to the death of Assemblyman Eric Munoz (District 21) on March 30, 2009
- Assistant Republican Leaders:
  - John E. Rooney (District 39)
  - Scott Rumana (District 40)
- Assistant Republican Whips:
  - Dawn Marie Addiego (District 8)
  - Dave Rible (District 11)
- Republican Parliamentarian: Richard Merkt (District 25)
- Republican Appropriations Officer: Richard Merkt (District 25)

== Members of the General Assembly (by District) ==
Two Democratic members Two Republican members

- District 1: Nelson Albano (D, Vineland) and Matthew W. Milam (D, Vineland)
- District 2: John F. Amodeo (R, Margate) and Vincent J. Polistina (R, Egg Harbor Township)
- District 3: John J. Burzichelli (D, Paulsboro) and Celeste Riley (D, Bridgeton)
- District 4: Sandra Love (D, Laurel Springs) and Paul D. Moriarty (D, Washington Township, Gloucester County)
- District 5: Nilsa Cruz-Perez (D, Camden) and Joseph J. Roberts (D, Brooklawn)
- District 6: Louis Greenwald (D, Voorhees) and Pamela Rosen Lampitt (D, Cherry Hill Township)
- District 7: Herb Conaway (D, Delanco) and Jack Conners (D, Pennsauken)
- District 8: Dawn Marie Addiego (R, Marlton) and Scott Rudder (R, Medford)
- District 9: Brian E. Rumpf (R, Little Egg Harbor) and the other is vacant following the resignation of Daniel Van Pelt (R, Ocean Township) on July 31, 2009.
- District 10: James W. Holzapfel (R, Toms River) and David W. Wolfe (R, Brick)
- District 11: Mary Pat Angelini (R, Ocean Township) and Dave Rible (R, Wall Township)
- District 12: Caroline Casagrande (R, Colts Neck Township) and Declan O'Scanlon (R, Little Silver)
- District 13: Amy Handlin (R, Middletown) and Samuel D. Thompson (R, Old Bridge Township)
- District 14: Wayne DeAngelo (D, Hamilton) and Linda R. Greenstein (D, Plainsboro)
- District 15: Reed Gusciora (D, Princeton) and Bonnie Watson Coleman (D, Ewing)
- District 16: Peter J. Biondi (R, Hillsborough) and Denise Coyle (R, Bound Brook)
- District 17: Upendra J. Chivukula (D, Somerset) and Joseph V. Egan (D, New Brunswick)
- District 18: Peter J. Barnes III (D, Edison) and Patrick J. Diegnan (D, South Plainfield)
- District 19: Joseph Vas (D, Perth Amboy) and John S. Wisniewski (D, Sayreville)
- District 20: Joseph Cryan (D, Union) and Annette Quijano (D, Elizabeth)
- District 21: Jon Bramnick (R, Westfield) and Nancy Munoz (R, Summit)
- District 22: Jerry Green (D, Plainfield) and Linda Stender (D, Fanwood)
- District 23: John DiMaio (R, Hackettstown)
- District 24: Gary R. Chiusano (R, Franklin, New Jersey) and Alison Littell McHose (R, Sparta Township)
- District 25: Michael Patrick Carroll (R, Morris Township) and Richard A. Merkt (R, Mendham Township)
- District 26: Alex DeCroce (R, Morris Plains) and Jay Webber (R, Morris Plains)
- District 27: Mila Jasey (D, South Orange) and John F. McKeon (D, West Orange)
- District 28: Ralph R. Caputo (D, Belleville) and Cleopatra Tucker (D, Newark)
- District 29: Alberto Coutinho (D, Newark) and L. Grace Spencer (D, Newark)
- District 30: Ronald S. Dancer (R, New Egypt) and Joseph R. Malone (R, Bordentown)
- District 31: Anthony Chiappone (D, Bayonne) and L. Harvey Smith (D, Jersey City)
- District 32: Vincent Prieto (D, Secaucus) and Joan M. Quigley (D, Jersey City)
- District 33: Ruben J. Ramos (D, Hoboken) and Caridad Rodriguez (D, West New York)
- District 34: Thomas P. Giblin (D, Montclair) and Sheila Y. Oliver (D, East Orange)
- District 35: Elease Evans (D, Paterson) and Nellie Pou (D, North Haledon)
- District 36: Frederick Scalera (D, Nutley) and Gary Schaer (D, Passaic)
- District 37: Valerie Huttle (D, Englewood) and Gordon M. Johnson (D, Englewood)
- District 38: Joan Voss (D, Fort Lee) and Connie Wagner (D, Paramus)
- District 39: John E. Rooney (R, Northvale) and Charlotte Vandervalk (R, Hillsdale)
- District 40: Scott Rumana (R, Wayne) and David C. Russo (R, Ridgewood)

Affiliation	Members
Democratic Party	48
Republican Party	32
Total	80

== See also ==
- List of New Jersey state legislatures
