= 215th New Jersey Legislature =

2012 to 2013 legislative session

←	214th Legislature	216th Legislature	→
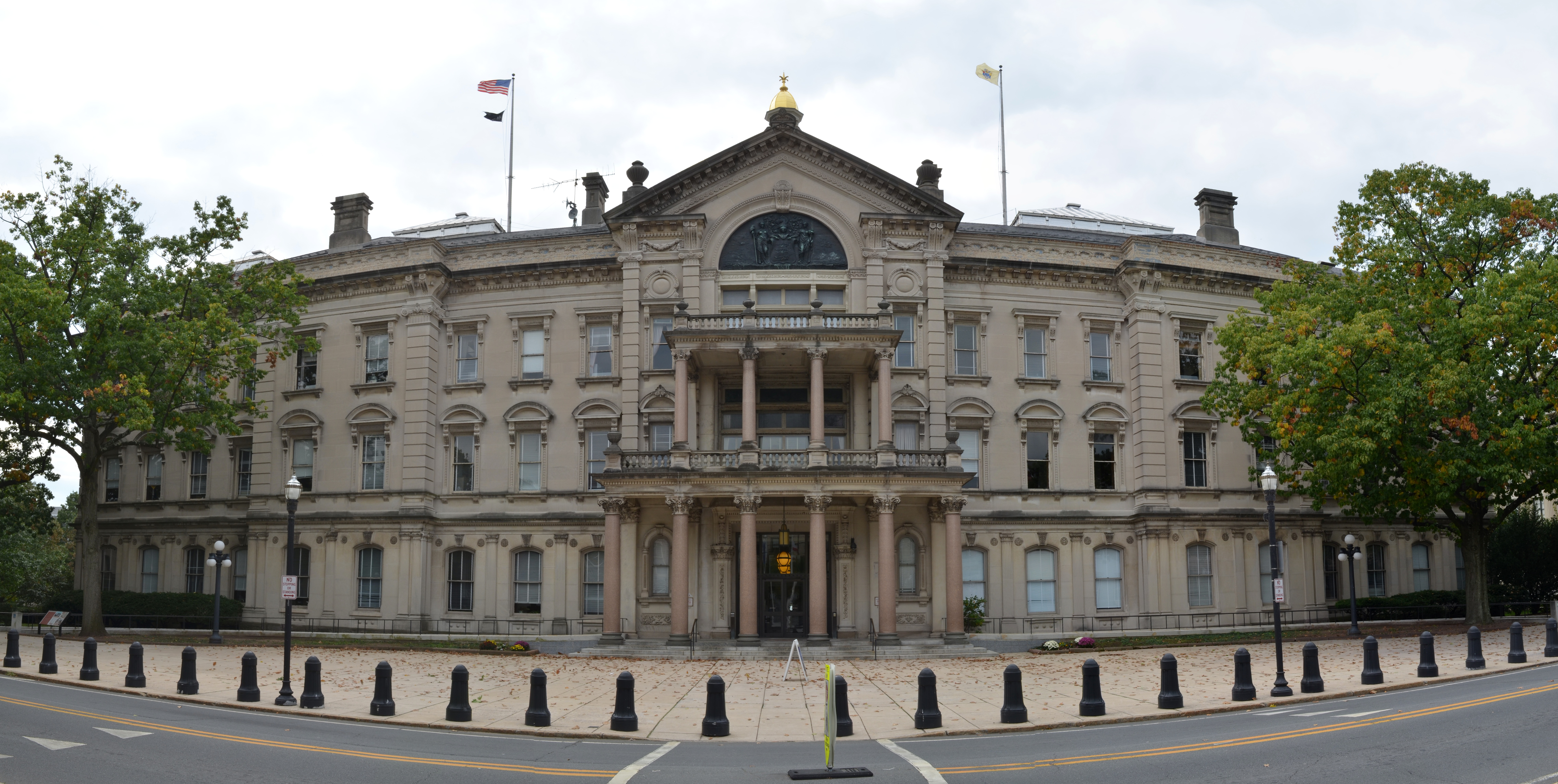
- New Jersey State House north panorama, 2012

Overview
- Legislative body: New Jersey Legislature
- Jurisdiction: New Jersey, United States
- Term: January 10, 2012 – January 14, 2014

New Jersey Senate
- Members: 40
- President: Stephen M. Sweeney
- Minority Leader: Thomas Kean Jr.
- Party control: Democratic Party

New Jersey General Assembly
- Members: 80
- Speaker: Sheila Oliver
- Minority Leader: Alex DeCroce
- Party control: Democratic Party

The 215th New Jersey Legislature began on January 10, 2012, and ended on January 14, 2014. Members were elected in the 2011 New Jersey Senate election and the 2011 New Jersey General Assembly election.

== General Assembly ==
=== Composition ===
Two Democratic members Two Republican members

Affiliation	Party (shading indicates majority caucus)		Total	
Affiliation	Democratic	Republican	Total	Vacancies
End of previous legislature	48	31	79	1
Begin (Note: Democrat Gabriela Mosquera (district 4) was ruled ineligible to appear on the November ballot on January 5. Seat remained vacant at the start of the session. Republican Peter Biondi (district 16) died November 11, 2011.)	47	31	78	2
January 9, 2012 (Note: Republican Alex DeCroce (district 26) died.)	47	30	77	3
February 1, 2012 (Note: Republican Donna Simon appointed to replace Biondi.)	47	31	78	2
February 29, 2012 (Note: Democrat Gabriela Mosquera appointed to vacant district 4 seat, as she met the residency requirement.)	48	31	79	1
March 5, 2012 (Note: Republican Betty Lou DeCroce appointed to replace DeCroce.)	48	32	80	0
February 11, 2013 (Note: Republican Gary Chiusano resigned to become Sussex County Surrogate.)	48	31	79	1
February 28, 2013 (Note: Democrat Matthew Milam resigned.)	47	31	78	2
March 21, 2013 (Note: Democrat Robert Andrzejczak appointed to replace Milam and Republican Parker Spence appointed to replace Chiusano)	48	32	80	0
September 11, 2013 (Note: Democrat Alberto Coutinho resigned.)	47	32	79	1
October 1, 2013 (Note: Democrat Connie Wagner resigned.)	46	32	78	2
November 18, 2013 (Note: Democrats Eliana Pintor-Marin and Paul Contillo sworn in.)	48	32	80	0
Latest voting share	60%	40%		

=== Members at the end of the term ===
District	Name	Party	Residence	First served
District 1	Nelson Albano	Dem	Vineland	2006
District 1	Robert Andrzejczak	Dem	Middle Twp.	2013†
District 2	John F. Amodeo	Rep	Margate	2008
District 2	Chris A. Brown	Rep	Ventnor	2012
District 3	John J. Burzichelli	Dem	Paulsboro	2002
District 3	Celeste Riley	Dem	Bridgeton	2009†
District 4	Paul Moriarty	Dem	Washington Twp.	2006
District 4	Gabriela Mosquera	Dem	Blackwood	2012†
District 5	Angel Fuentes	Dem	Camden	2010
District 5	Gilbert "Whip" Wilson	Dem	Camden	2010†
District 6	Louis Greenwald	Dem	Voorhees Twp.	1996
District 6	Pamela Rosen Lampitt	Dem	Cherry Hill	2006
District 7	Herb Conaway	Dem	Delanco	1998
District 7	Troy Singleton	Dem	Palmyra	2011†
District 8	Christopher J. Brown	Rep	Marlton	2012
District 8	Scott Rudder	Rep	Medford	2008
District 9	DiAnne Gove	Rep	Long Beach Twp.	2009†
District 9	Brian E. Rumpf	Rep	Little Egg Harbor	2003†
District 10	Gregory P. McGuckin	Rep	Toms River	2012
District 10	David W. Wolfe	Rep	Brick	1992
District 11	Mary Pat Angelini	Rep	Ocean Twp.	2008
District 11	Caroline Casagrande	Rep	Colts Neck	2008
District 12	Robert D. Clifton	Rep	Matawan	2012
District 12	Ronald S. Dancer	Rep	Plumstead Twp.	2002†
District 13	Amy Handlin	Rep	Lincroft	2006
District 13	Declan O'Scanlon	Rep	Little Silver	2008
District 14	Daniel R. Benson	Dem	Hamilton Twp.	2011†
District 14	Wayne DeAngelo	Dem	Hamilton Twp.	2008
District 15	Reed Gusciora	Dem	Trenton	1996
District 15	Bonnie Watson Coleman	Dem	Ewing Twp.	1998
District 16	Jack Ciattarelli	Rep	Hillsborough Twp.	2011†
District 16	Donna Simon	Rep	Whitehouse Station	2012†
District 17	Upendra J. Chivukula	Dem	Somerset	2002
District 17	Joseph V. Egan	Dem	New Brunswick	2002
District 18	Peter J. Barnes III	Dem	Edison	2007†
District 18	Patrick J. Diegnan	Dem	South Plainfield	2002
District 19	Craig Coughlin	Dem	Fords	2010
District 19	John S. Wisniewski	Dem	Sayreville	1996
District 20	Joseph Cryan	Dem	Union Twp.	2002
District 20	Annette Quijano	Dem	Elizabeth	2008†
District 21	Jon Bramnick	Rep	Westfield	2003†
District 21	Nancy Munoz	Rep	Summit	2009†
District 22	Jerry Green	Dem	Plainfield	1992
District 22	Linda Stender	Dem	Scotch Plains	2002
District 23	John DiMaio	Rep	Hackettstown	2009†
District 23	Erik Peterson	Rep	Franklin Twp.	2009†
District 24	Alison Littell McHose	Rep	Franklin	2003†
District 24	Parker Space	Rep	Wantage Twp.	2013†
District 25	Tony Bucco	Rep	Boonton Twp.	2010
District 25	Michael Patrick Carroll	Rep	Morris Twp.	1996
District 26	BettyLou DeCroce	Rep	Morris Plains	2012†
District 26	Jay Webber	Rep	Morris Plains	2008
District 27	Mila Jasey	Dem	South Orange	2007†
District 27	John F. McKeon	Dem	West Orange	2002
District 28	Ralph R. Caputo	Dem	Bloomfield	2008^{1}
District 28	Cleopatra Tucker	Dem	Newark	2008
District 29	Eliana Pintor-Marin	Dem	Newark	2013†
District 29	L. Grace Spencer	Dem	Newark	2008
District 30	Sean T. Kean	Rep	Wall Twp.	2012^{2}
District 30	Dave Rible	Rep	Wall	2008
District 31	Charles Mainor	Dem	Jersey City	2010
District 31	Jason O'Donnell	Dem	Bayonne	2010†
District 32	Angelica M. Jimenez	Dem	West New York	2012
District 32	Vincent Prieto	Dem	Secaucus	2004†
District 33	Sean Connors	Dem	Jersey City	2012
District 33	Ruben J. Ramos	Dem	Hoboken	2008
District 34	Thomas P. Giblin	Dem	Montclair	2006
District 34	Sheila Y. Oliver	Dem	East Orange	2004
District 35	Shavonda E. Sumter	Dem	Paterson	2012
District 35	Benjie Wimberly	Dem	Paterson	2012
District 36	Marlene Caride	Dem	Ridgefield	2012
District 36	Gary Schaer	Dem	Passaic	2006
District 37	Valerie Huttle	Dem	Englewood	2006
District 37	Gordon M. Johnson	Dem	Englewood	2002
District 38	Tim Eustace	Dem	Maywood	2012
District 38	Paul Contillo	Dem	Paramus	2013†^{3}
District 39	Holly Schepisi	Rep	River Vale	2012
District 39	Bob Schroeder	Rep	Washington Twp.	2010
District 40	Scott Rumana	Rep	Wayne	2008
District 40	David C. Russo	Rep	Ridgewood	1990

† First appointed to the seat.
^{1} Ralph Caputo served in the Assembly as a Republican from 1968–1972.
^{2} Sean Kean served in the Assembly from 2002–2008 and in the State Senate from 2008–2012. ^{3} Paul Contillo served in the Assembly from 1974–1980 and in the State Senate from 1984–1992.

=== Former members from this term ===
District	Name	Party	Residence	First served	Term end	Notes
District 24	Gary R. Chiusano	Rep	Augusta	2008	February 11, 2013	Resigned to become Sussex County Surrogate
District 1	Matthew W. Milam	Dem	Vineland	2008	February 28, 2013	Retired
District 29	Alberto Coutinho	Dem	Newark	2008	September 11, 2013	Resigned
District 38	Connie Wagner	Dem	Paramus	2008	October 1, 2013	Retired

== Senate ==
=== Composition ===
Democratic Senator Republican Senator

District	Incumbent	Party
1st Legislative District	Jeff Van Drew	Dem
2nd Legislative District	Jim Whelan	Dem
3rd Legislative District	Steve Sweeney	Dem
4th Legislative District	Fred Madden	Dem
5th Legislative District	Donald Norcross	Dem
6th Legislative District	James Beach	Dem
7th Legislative District	Diane Allen	Rep
8th Legislative District	Dawn Addiego	Rep
9th Legislative District	Christopher Connors	Rep
10th Legislative District	Jim Holzapfel	Rep
11th Legislative District	Jennifer Beck	Rep
12th Legislative District	Samuel D. Thompson	Rep
13th Legislative District	Joe Kyrillos	Rep
14th Legislative District	Linda Greenstein	Dem
15th Legislative District	Shirley Turner	Dem
16th Legislative District	Kip Bateman	Rep
17th Legislative District	Bob Smith	Dem
18th Legislative District	Barbara Buono	Dem
19th Legislative District	Joe Vitale	Dem
20th Legislative District	Raymond Lesniak	Dem
21st Legislative District	Tom Kean Jr.	Rep
22nd Legislative District	Nicholas Scutari	Dem
23rd Legislative District	Michael Doherty	Rep
24th Legislative District	Steve Oroho	Rep
25th Legislative District	Anthony Bucco	Rep
26th Legislative District	Joe Pennacchio	Rep
27th Legislative District	Richard Codey	Dem
28th Legislative District	Ronald Rice	Dem
29th Legislative District	Teresa Ruiz	Dem
30th Legislative District	Robert W. Singer	Rep
31st Legislative District	Sandra Bolden Cunningham	Dem
32nd Legislative District	Nicholas Sacco	Dem
33rd Legislative District	Brian Stack	Dem
34th Legislative District	Nia Gill	Dem
35th Legislative District	Nellie Pou	Dem
36th Legislative District	Paul Sarlo	Dem
37th Legislative District	Loretta Weinberg	Dem
38th Legislative District	Robert M. Gordon	Dem
39th Legislative District	Gerald Cardinale	Rep
40th Legislative District	Kevin O'Toole	Rep

== See also ==
- List of New Jersey state legislatures
