= New Jersey legislative districts, 2011 apportionment =

New Jersey Legislature
- 216th through 220th Legislatures

Type
- Type: Bicameral
- Houses: Senate; General Assembly

History
- Founded: January 10, 2012
- Disbanded: January 9, 2024
- Preceded by: 2001 apportionment
- Succeeded by: 2021 apportionment

Structure
- Seats: 120
- Political groups: Democratic Party; Republican Party

Meeting place
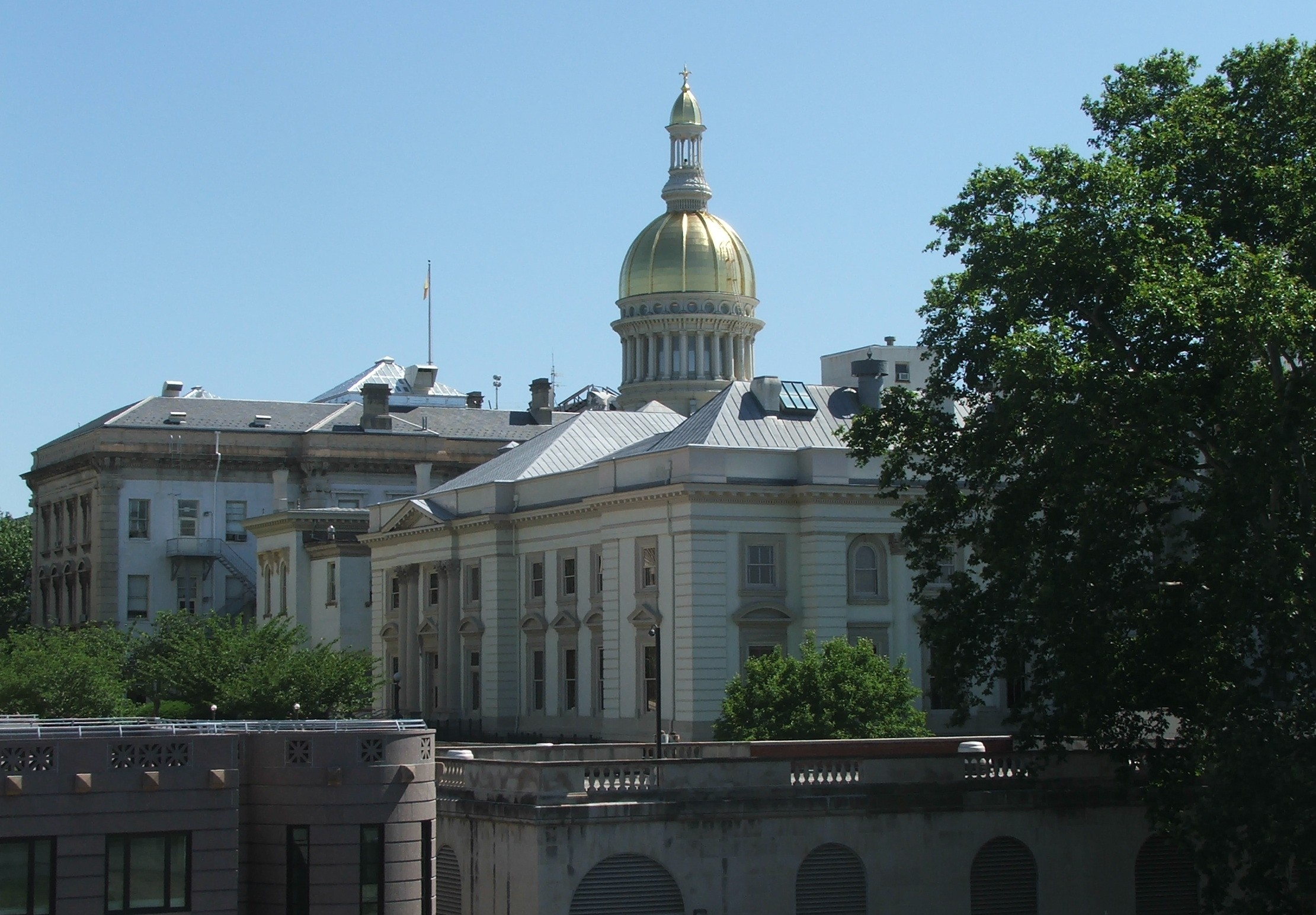
- New Jersey State House, Trenton, New Jersey

Website
- njleg.state.nj.us

as per 2011 redistricting

The members of the New Jersey Legislature are chosen from 40 electoral districts. Each district elects one senator and two assemblymen.

New Jersey is one of only seven states with nested state legislative districts, in which two or more state House are coextensive with a single state Senate seat. In New Jersey, each district elects one Senator and two Assembly members. (States that have similar practices are Arizona, Idaho, Maryland, North Dakota, South Dakota, and Washington.)

Districts are reapportioned decennially by the New Jersey Apportionment Commission following each United States census, as provided by Article IV, Section III of the state Constitution.

The most recent changes to the legislative districts were in effect in the primary elections held in June 2011 and the general elections of November 2011, following the 2010 United States census.

== District 1 ==
Avalon, Cape May City, Cape May Point, Commercial Township, Corbin City, Dennis Township, Downe Township, Estell Manor City, Fairfield Township (Cumberland), Greenwich Township (Cumberland), Hopewell Township (Cumberland), Lawrence Township (Cumberland), Lower Township, Maurice River Township, Middle Township, Millville, North Wildwood, Ocean City, Sea Isle City, Shiloh, Stone Harbor, Stow Creek Township, Upper Township, Vineland, West Cape May, West Wildwood, Weymouth Township, Wildwood, Wildwood Crest, Woodbine

== District 2 ==
Absecon, Atlantic City, Brigantine, Buena, Buena Vista Township, Egg Harbor City, Egg Harbor Township, Folsom, Hamilton Township (Atlantic), Linwood, Longport, Margate City, Mullica Township, Northfield, Pleasantville, Somers Point, Ventnor City

== District 3 ==
Alloway Township, Bridgeton, Carneys Point Township, Clayton, Deerfield Township, East Greenwich Township, Elk Township, Elmer, Elsinboro Township, Franklin Township (Gloucester), Glassboro, Greenwich Township (Gloucester), Logan Township, Lower Alloways Creek Township, Mannington Township, National Park, Newfield, Oldmans Township, Paulsboro, Penns Grove, Pennsville Township, Pilesgrove Township, Pittsgrove Township, Quinton Township, Salem, South Harrison Township, Swedesboro, Upper Deerfield Township, Upper Pittsgrove Township, West Deptford Township, Woodbury Heights, Woodstown, Woolwich Township

== District 4 ==
Chesilhurst, Clementon, Gloucester Township, Laurel Springs, Lindenwold, Monroe Township (Gloucester), Pitman, Washington Township (Gloucester), Winslow Township

== District 5 ==
Audubon, Audubon Park, Barrington, Bellmawr, Brooklawn, Camden, Deptford Township, Gloucester City, Haddon Heights, Harrison Township, Lawnside, Magnolia, Mantua Township, Mount Ephraim, Runnemede, Wenonah, Westville, Woodbury, Woodlynne

== District 6 ==
Berlin Township, Cherry Hill Township, Collingswood, Gibbsboro, Haddon Township, Haddonfield, Hi-Nella, Maple Shade Township, Merchantville, Oaklyn Borough, Pennsauken Township, Somerdale, Stratford, Tavistock, Voorhees Township

== District 7 ==
Beverly, Bordentown, Bordentown Township, Burlington, Burlington Township, Cinnaminson Township, Delanco Township, Delran Township, Edgewater Park Township, Fieldsboro, Florence Township, Moorestown Township, Mount Laurel Township, Palmyra, Riverside Township, Riverton Borough, Willingboro Township

== District 8 ==
Berlin, Eastampton Township, Evesham Township, Hainesport Township, Hammonton, Lumberton Township, Mansfield Township (Burlington), Medford Lakes, Medford Township, Mount Holly Township, Pemberton, Pemberton Township, Pine Hill, Shamong Township, Southampton Township, Springfield Township (Burlington), Waterford Township, Westampton Township, Woodland Township

== District 9 ==
Barnegat Light, Barnegat Township, Bass River Township, Beach Haven, Beachwood, Berkeley Township, Eagleswood Township, Galloway Township, Harvey Cedars, Lacey Township, Little Egg Harbor Township, Long Beach Township, Ocean Gate, Ocean Township (Ocean), Pine Beach, Port Republic, Seaside Park, Ship Bottom, South Toms River, Stafford Township, Surf City, Tabernacle Township, Tuckerton, Washington Township (Burlington)

== District 10 ==
Bay Head, Brick Township, Island Heights, Lakehurst, Lavallette, Manchester Township, Mantoloking, Point Pleasant Beach, Seaside Heights, Toms River

== District 11 ==
Allenhurst, Asbury Park, Colts Neck Township, Deal, Eatontown, Freehold Borough, Freehold Township, Interlaken, Loch Arbour, Long Branch, Neptune City, Neptune Township, Ocean Township (Monmouth), Red Bank, Shrewsbury, Shrewsbury Township, Tinton Falls, West Long Branch

== District 12 ==
Allentown, Chesterfield Township, Englishtown, Jackson Township, Manalapan Township, Matawan, Millstone Township, New Hanover Township, North Hanover Township, Old Bridge Township, Plumsted Township, Roosevelt, Upper Freehold Township, Wrightstown

== District 13 ==
Aberdeen Township, Atlantic Highlands, Fair Haven, Hazlet Township, Highlands, Holmdel Township, Keansburg, Keyport, Little Silver, Marlboro Township, Middletown Township, Monmouth Beach, Oceanport, Rumson, Sea Bright, Union Beach

== District 14 ==
Cranbury Township, East Windsor Township, Hamilton Township (Mercer), Hightstown, Jamesburg, Monroe Township (Middlesex), Plainsboro Township, Robbinsville Township, Spotswood

== District 15 ==
East Amwell Township, Ewing Township, Hopewell, Hopewell Township (Mercer), Lambertville, Lawrence Township (Mercer), Pennington, Trenton, West Amwell Township, West Windsor Township

== District 16 ==
Branchburg Township, Delaware Township (Hunterdon), Flemington, Hillsborough Township, Manville, Millstone, Montgomery Township, Princeton, Raritan Township, Readington Township, Rocky Hill, Somerville, South Brunswick Township, Stockton

== District 17 ==
Franklin Township (Somerset), Milltown, New Brunswick, North Brunswick Township, Piscataway

== District 18 ==
East Brunswick, Edison, Helmetta, Highland Park, Metuchen, South Plainfield, South River,

== District 19 ==
Carteret, Perth Amboy, Sayreville, South Amboy, Woodbridge Township

== District 20 ==
Elizabeth, Hillside, Roselle, Union Township (Union)

== District 21 ==
Berkeley Heights, Bernards Township, Chatham, Cranford, Far Hills, Garwood, Kenilworth, Long Hill Township, Mountainside, New Providence, Roselle Park, Springfield Township (Union), Summit, Warren Township, Watchung, Westfield

== District 22 ==
Clark, Dunellen, Fanwood, Green Brook Township, Linden, Middlesex, North Plainfield, Plainfield, Rahway, Scotch Plains, Winfield Township

== District 23 ==
Alexandria Township, Alpha, Bedminster Township, Bethlehem Township, Bloomsbury, Bound Brook, Bridgewater Township, Califon, Clinton, Clinton Township, Franklin Township (Hunterdon), Franklin Township (Warren), Frenchtown, Glen Gardner, Greenwich Township (Warren), Hackettstown, Hampton, Harmony Township, High Bridge, Holland Township, Kingwood Township, Lebanon, Lebanon Township, Lopatcong Township, Mansfield Township (Warren), Milford, Peapack-Gladstone, Phillipsburg, Pohatcong Township, Raritan, South Bound Brook, Tewksbury Township, Union Township (Hunterdon), Washington Borough, Washington Township (Warren)

== District 24 ==
Allamuchy Township, Andover, Andover Township, Belvidere, Blairstown, Branchville, Byram Township, Frankford Township, Franklin, Fredon Township, Frelinghuysen Township, Green Township, Hamburg, Hampton Township, Hardwick Township, Hardyston Township, Hopatcong, Hope Township, Independence Township, Knowlton Township, Lafayette Township, Liberty Township, Montague Township, Mount Olive Township, Newton, Ogdensburg, Oxford Township, Sandyston Township, Sparta Township, Stanhope, Stillwater Township, Sussex, Vernon Township, Walpack Township, Wantage Township, White Township

== District 25 ==
Bernardsville, Boonton, Boonton Township, Chester, Chester Township, Denville Township, Dover, Mendham, Mendham Township, Mine Hill Township, Morris Township, Morristown, Mount Arlington, Mountain Lakes, Netcong, Randolph Township, Rockaway, Roxbury Township, Victory Gardens, Washington Township (Morris), Wharton

== District 26 ==
Butler, Fairfield Township (Essex), Jefferson Township, Kinnelon, Lincoln Park, Montville, Morris Plains, North Caldwell, Parsippany-Troy Hills, Rockaway Township, Verona, West Caldwell, West Milford

== District 27 ==
Caldwell, Chatham Township, East Hanover, Essex Fells, Florham Park, Hanover Township, Harding Township, Livingston, Madison, Maplewood, Millburn, Roseland, South Orange Village, West Orange

== District 28 ==
Bloomfield, Glen Ridge, Irvington, Newark (partial), Nutley

== District 29 ==
Belleville, Newark (partial)

== District 30 ==
Avon-by-the-Sea, Belmar, Bradley Beach, Brielle, Farmingdale, Howell Township, Lake Como, Lakewood Township, Manasquan, Point Pleasant, Sea Girt, Spring Lake, Spring Lake Heights, Wall Township

== District 31 ==
Bayonne, Jersey City (partial)

== District 32 ==
East Newark, Edgewater, Fairview Borough (Bergen), Guttenberg, Harrison, Kearny, North Bergen, Secaucus, West New York

== District 33 ==
Hoboken, Jersey City (partial), Union City, Weehawken

== District 34 ==
Orange, Clifton, East Orange, Montclair

== District 35 ==
Elmwood Park, Garfield, Haledon, North Haledon, Paterson, Prospect Park

== District 36 ==
Carlstadt, Cliffside Park, East Rutherford, Little Ferry, Lyndhurst, Moonachie, North Arlington, Passaic, Ridgefield, Ridgefield Park, Rutherford, South Hackensack, Teterboro, Wallington, Wood-Ridge

== District 37 ==
Alpine, Bogota, Cresskill, Englewood, Englewood Cliffs, Fort Lee, Hackensack, Leonia, Northvale, Palisades Park, Rockleigh, Teaneck, Tenafly

== District 38 ==
Bergenfield, Fair Lawn, Glen Rock, Hasbrouck Heights, Hawthorne, Lodi, Maywood, New Milford, Oradell, Paramus, River Edge, Rochelle Park, Saddle Brook

== District 39 ==
Bloomingdale, Closter, Demarest, Dumont, Emerson, Harrington Park, Haworth, Hillsdale, Mahwah, Montvale, Norwood, Oakland, Old Tappan, Park Ridge, Ramsey, Ringwood, River Vale, Saddle River, Upper Saddle River, Wanaque, Washington Township (Bergen), Westwood, Woodcliff Lake,

== District 40 ==
Allendale, Cedar Grove, Franklin Lakes, Ho-Ho-Kus, Little Falls, Midland Park, Pequannock Township, Pompton Lakes, Ridgewood, Riverdale, Totowa, Waldwick, Wayne, Woodland Park Borough, Wyckoff
