= Willow Creek Winery =

American winery located in New Jersey

Coordinates: 38.942778°N 74.946927°W

- Location: 160-168 Stevens Street, West Cape May, NJ, USA
- Coordinates: 38.942778 N, 74.946927 W
- Wine region: Cape May Peninsula
- Appellation: Outer Coastal Plain AVA
- Other labels: Wilde Cock
- First vines planted: 2005
- Opened to the public: 2012
- Key people: Barbara Bray Wilde (owner)
- Area cultivated: 40
- Cases/yr: 6,000 (2013)
- Varietal: Pinot Noir, Malvasia Bianca, Chamborcin, Seyval Blanc, Merlot, Pinot Gris
- Other products: Eggs, flowers, fruits, honey, poultry, vegetables, wormwood
- Other attractions: Vineyard View Cottages available for farm stays
- Distribution: On-site, home shipment
- Tasting: Daily tours and tastings
- Website: http://willowcreekwinery.com/

Willow Creek Winery is a winery in West Cape May in Cape May County, New Jersey. Formerly a produce farm, the vineyard was first planted in 2005, and opened to the public in 2012. Willow Creek has 40 acres of grapes under cultivation, and produces 6,000 cases of wine per year. The winery has recently purchased Legates Farm Market and is cultivating an additional 68 acres under vine. The winery is named for a large willow tree near the owner's residence, and the Pond Creek, a stream that borders the farm.

== Wines and other products ==
Willow Creek Winery is in the Outer Coastal Plain AVA, and produces wines from Albariño, Cabernet Franc, Cabernet Sauvignon, Chambourcin, Malbec, Malvasia bianca, Merlot, Muscat blanc, Pinot noir, Riesling, Sangiovese, Sauvignon blanc, Seyval blanc, and Syrah grapes. The farm also produces eggs, flowers, fruits, honey, poultry, vegetables, and wormwood. Willow Creek makes wine from local New Jersey apples and pumpkins, and has a separate brand for non-estate wines, named "Wilde Cock" after the owner and the roosters that live at the farm. The winery has expressed interest in producing absinthe in the future. Willow Creek is the only winery in New Jersey that produces wine from Malvasia bianca, which is a white vinifera grape indigenous to the northwest coast of Italy.

== Licensing, associations, and other properties ==
Willow Creek has a farm winery license from the New Jersey Division of Alcoholic Beverage Control, which allows it to produce up to 50,000 gallons of wine per year, operate up to 15 off-premises sales rooms, and ship up to 12 cases per year to consumers in-state or out-of-state. The winery is a member of the Garden State Wine Growers Association, but not the Outer Coastal Plain Vineyard Association. In 1996, the owner of Willow Creek founded The Southern Mansion, a 24-suite bed and breakfast in the neighboring town of Cape May. Food produced at the farm is served at The Southern Mansion.

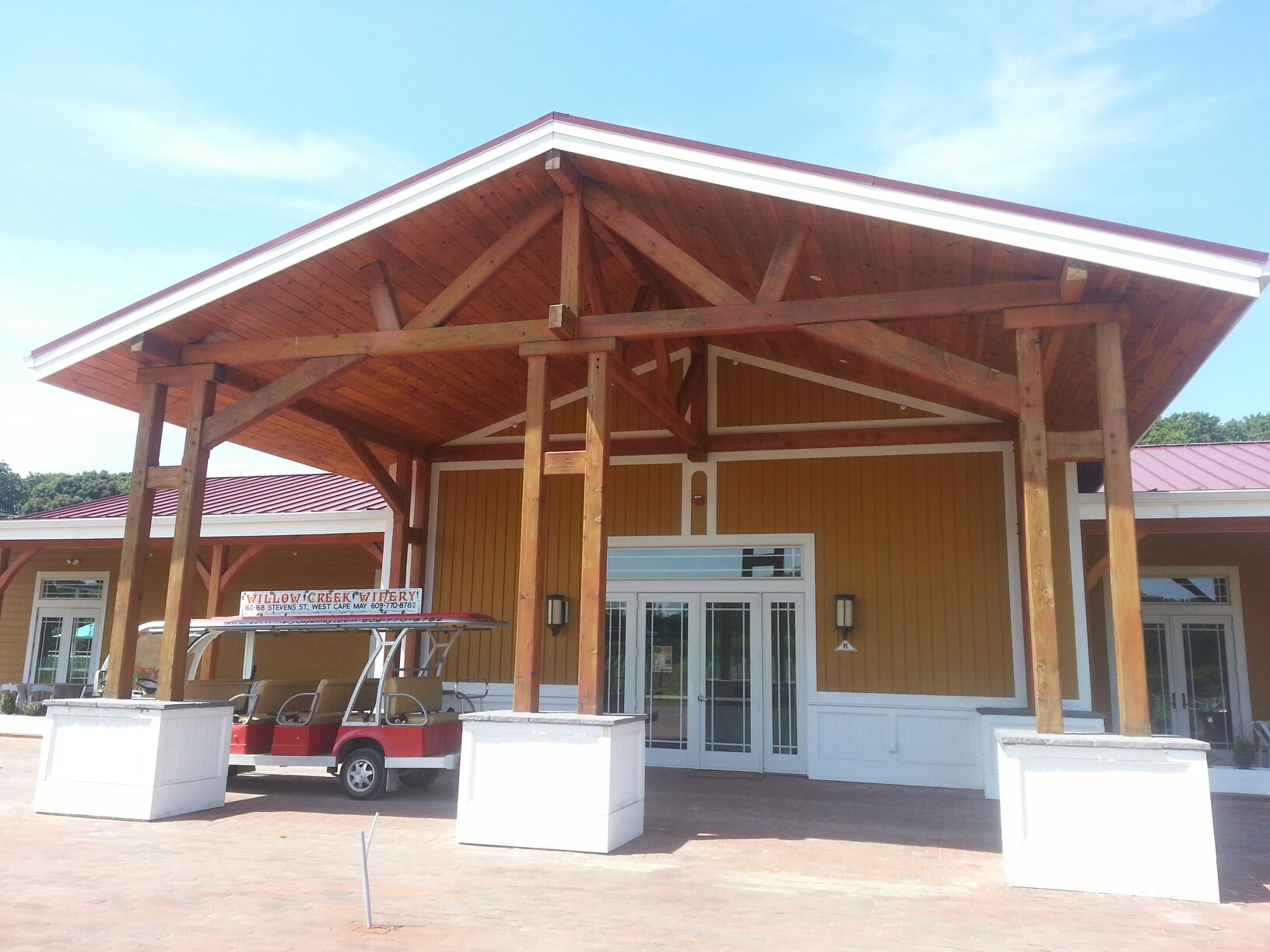
The timber frame in the 12,000 square foot tasting facility at Willow Creek Winery was designed and built by Lancaster County Timber Frames, Inc. from Pennsylvania.

== Controversy ==
Willow Creek has had conflicts with municipal, county, and state authorities regarding the hosting of weddings at the winery. The West Cape May borough council has expressed concerns about potential noise and traffic from events, and several local and county officials have said that Willow Creek misrepresented how its facilities would be used. In 2012, the Cape May County Agriculture Development Board and the New Jersey Agriculture Development Committee stated that because the winery is on preserved farmland, it could not hold weddings or other non-agricultural events. Willow Creek maintains that the deed of easement granted when the farm was preserved does not prohibit celebratory events. The winery has since sued the mayor of West Cape May in federal court, stating that she has a conflict of interest in her land use decisions because she is also a marriage officiant. In June 2016, West Cape May decided to settle the lawsuit and agreed to pay Willow Creek Winery $550,000 to prevent a trial. In addition, the borough has had to make payments for violations of the Open Public Records Act due to withholding of requested public information.

== See also ==
- Alcohol laws of New Jersey
- Judgment of Princeton
- List of wineries, breweries, and distilleries in New Jersey
- New Jersey Farm Winery Act
- New Jersey wine
