= Whilldin–Miller House =

Historic house in New Jersey, United States

- U.S. National Register of Historic Places
- New Jersey Register of Historic Places
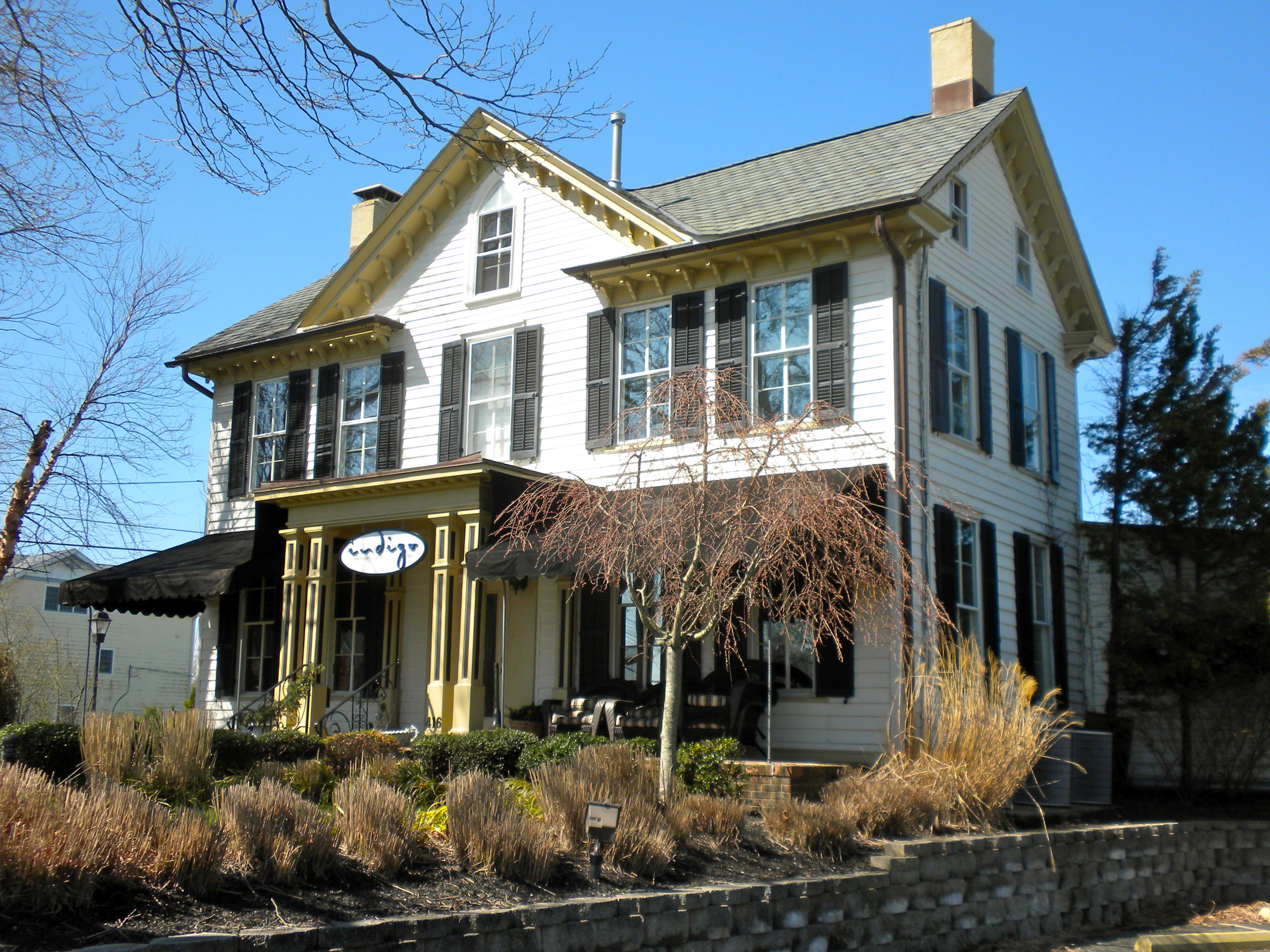

- Location within Cape May County, New Jersey Location within New Jersey Location within the United States
- Location: 416 South Broadway, West Cape May, New Jersey
- Coordinates: 38°56′4″N 74°55′53″W
- Area: 0.4 acres (0.16 ha)
- Built: 1860
- Architectural style: Italianate, Mid 19th Century Revival
- NRHP reference No.: 03000012
- NJRHP No.: 4110

Significant dates
- Added to NRHP: February 12, 2003
- Designated NJRHP: December 20, 2002

Whilldin–Miller House is located in West Cape May, Cape May County, New Jersey, United States. The front portion of the house was built in 1860 and added to the National Register of Historic Places on February 12, 2003. The original timber frame 2-story house remaining in the rear was built by Joseph Whilldin about 1715.

== See also ==
- National Register of Historic Places listings in Cape May County, New Jersey
