= West Cape May, New Jersey =

Borough in Cape May County, New Jersey, US

- Borough
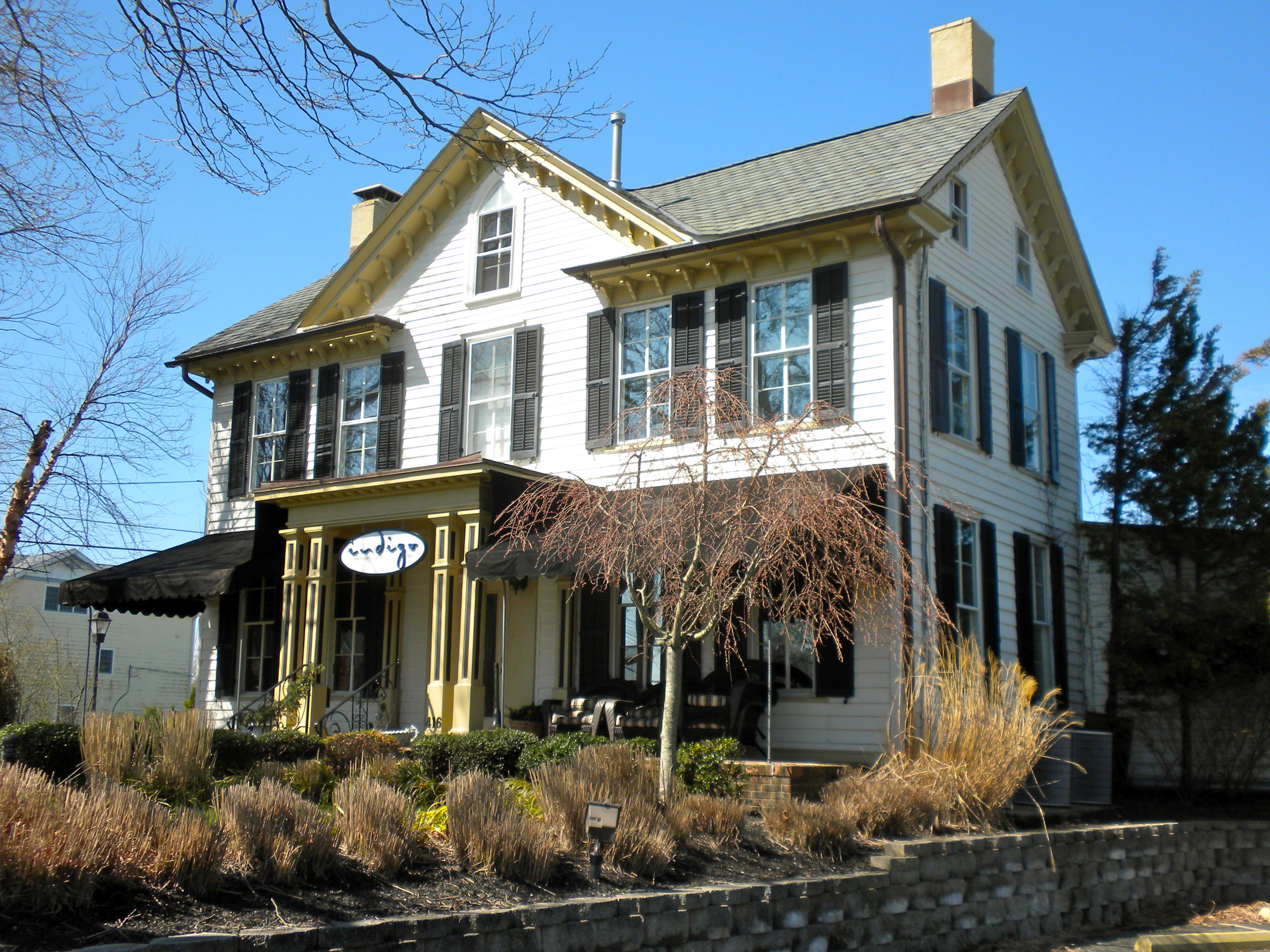
- Whilldin-Miller House

- logo

- Location of West Cape May in Cape May County highlighted in red (left). Inset map: Location of Cape May County in New Jersey highlighted in orange (right).

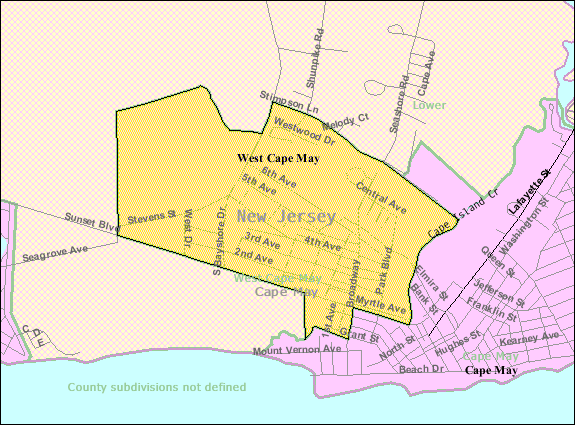
- Census Bureau map of West Cape May, New Jersey

- Location in Cape May County Location in New Jersey Location in the United States
- Coordinates: 38.942226°N 74.939033°W
- Country: United States
- State: New Jersey
- County: Cape May
- Incorporated: April 17, 1884
- Named for: Cape May / Cornelius Jacobsen May

Government
  - Type: Walsh Act
  - Body: Board of Commissioners
  - Mayor: Carol Sabo (term ends December 31, 2025)
  - Municipal clerk: Theresa Enteado

Area
  - Total: 1.19 sq mi (3.07 km^{2})
  - Land: 1.17 sq mi (3.04 km^{2})
  - Water: 0.012 sq mi (0.03 km^{2}) 1.09%
  - Rank: 489th of 565 in state 14th of 16 in county
- Elevation: 10 ft (3.0 m)

Population (2020)
  - Total: 1,010
  - Estimate (2023): 1,003
  - Rank: 530th of 565 in state 13th of 16 in county
  - Density: 860.8/sq mi (332.4/km^{2})
  - Rank: 400th of 565 in state 9th of 16 in county
- Time zone: UTC−05:00 (Eastern (EST))
  - Summer (DST): UTC−04:00 (Eastern (EDT))
- ZIP Code: 08204
- Area code: 609
- FIPS code: 3400978530
- GNIS feature ID: 0885435
- Website: www.westcapemay.us

West Cape May is a Walsh Act borough in Cape May County, in the U.S. state of New Jersey. The borough, and all of Cape May County, is part of the South Jersey region of the state and of the Ocean City metropolitan statistical area, which is part of the Philadelphia metropolitan area. As of the 2020 United States census, the borough's population was 1,010, a decrease of 14 (−1.4%) from the 2010 census count of 1,024, which in turn had reflected a decline of 71 (−6.5%) from the 1,095 counted at the 2000 census.

West Cape May was incorporated as a borough by an act of the New Jersey Legislature on April 17, 1884, from portions of Lower Township, based on the results of a referendum held two days earlier. The borough was reincorporated on April 11, 1890, and again on May 4, 1897. The borough's name derives from Cape May, which was named for 1620 Dutch captain named Cornelius Jacobsen May who explored and charted the area between 1611 and 1614, and established a claim for the province of New Netherland.

During Hurricane Sandy in October 2012, West Cape May was hit by 9.53 inches (242 mm) of rain, the most of any place in the state.

West Cape May had been a dry town until May 2012, when a new store opened after the Board of Commissioners approved the sale of a liquor license for more than $600,000. In 2008, voters approved a referendum that allowed the issuance of a single license for retail liquor sales and another for sale of alcoholic beverages at a restaurant. The borough had been dry for 128 years, where alcohol cannot be sold, affirmed by the results of a referendum held in 1940, joining Cape May Point, Ocean City and Wildwood Crest among municipalities in Cape May restricting the sale of alcohol.

== History ==
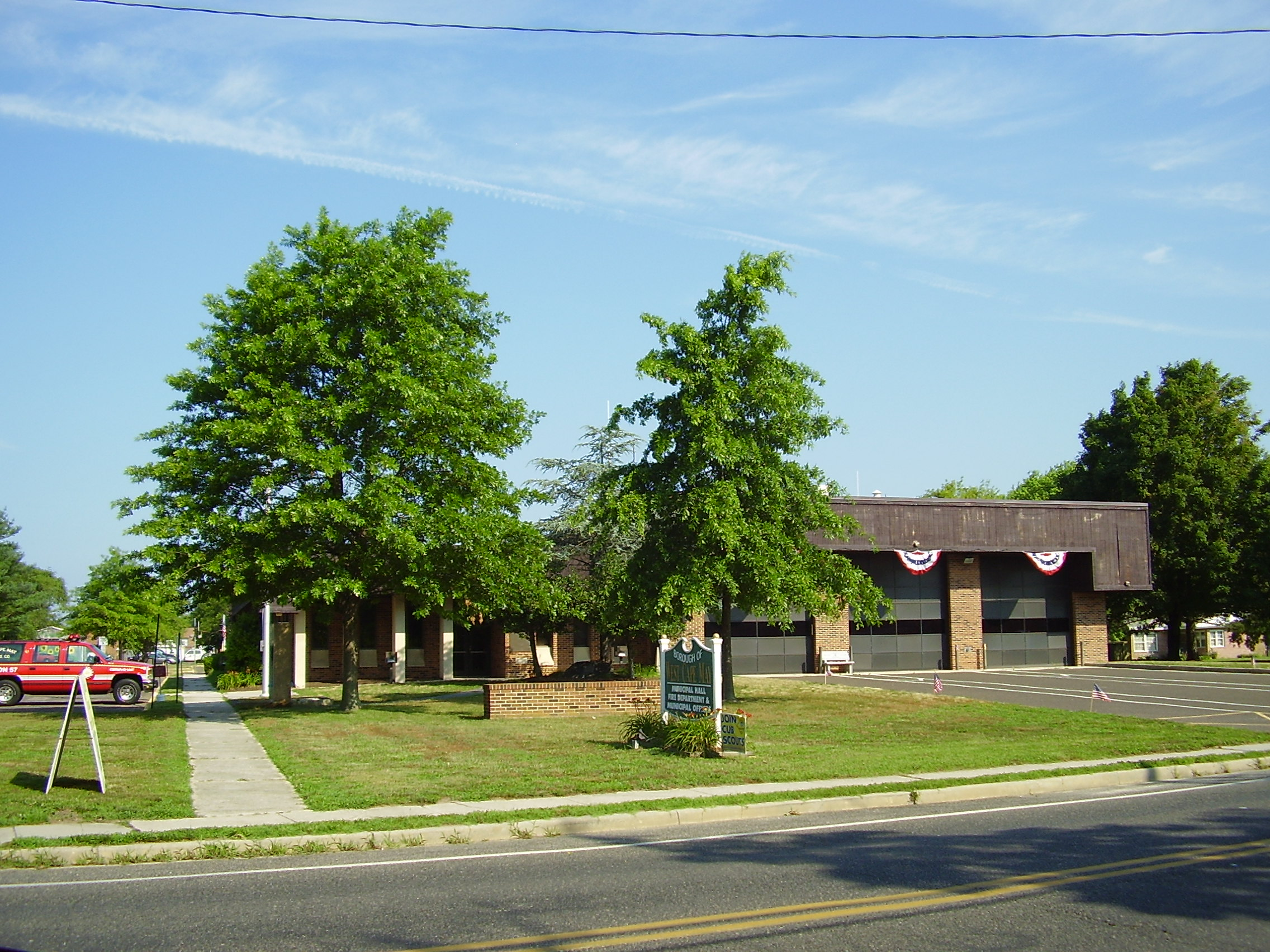
West Cape May Volunteer Fire Company

The borough's history goes back to the time of the Lenape Native Americans. Several buildings in the borough date to the Colonial period. The area has a rich agricultural history which continues to be celebrated each year with a summer farmers' market, and strawberry, tomato and lima bean festivals. It has been known as the "Lima Bean Capital of the World." The Lima Bean Festival is an annual event held in West Cape May, New Jersey, the "Lima Bean Capital of the World", and is the world's only such celebration. It is held annually on the Saturday of Columbus Day weekend in Wilbraham Park.

West Cape May, once known as Eldredge, is one of the four jurisdictions that comprise Cape Island in Cape May County. West Cape May was incorporated as a borough by an act of the New Jersey Legislature on April 17, 1884, from portions of Lower Township, based on the results of a referendum held two days earlier. The borough was reincorporated on April 11, 1890, and again on May 4, 1897.

The Borough has reported ties to the Underground Railroad.

From 1881 to 1931, the Hastings Goldbeating Company was located in the Borough employing women to pound one-inch strips of gold into gossamer-thin sheets used for decorative arts. Women continued to do the "booking" of gold leaf sheets until 1961. A plaque indicating the location of the factory can be found on Goldbeaten Alley. It was this business, along with real estate speculation and subdivision of the land, that led to the Borough's incorporation in 1884.

=== Historic sites ===
The historic core of the Borough was placed on the National Register of Historic Places along with sections of the City of Cape May in 1976.

Whilldin-Miller House was added to the National Register of Historic Places on February 12, 2003. The original timber frame two-story house remaining in the rear was built by Joseph Whilldin about 1715, while the front portion of the house was built in 1860, making it one of the oldest remaining houses on Cape Island.

== Geography ==
According to the United States Census Bureau, the borough had a total area of 1.19 square miles (3.07 km^{2}), including 1.17 square miles (3.04 km^{2}) of land and 0.01 square miles (0.03 km^{2}) of water (1.09%).

The borough borders the Cape May County municipalities of Cape May City and Lower Township.

== Demographics ==
Historical population
Census	Pop.	Note	%±
1890	757		—
1900	696		−8.1%
1910	844		21.3%
1920	967		14.6%
1930	1,048		8.4%
1940	934		−10.9%
1950	897		−4.0%
1960	1,030		14.8%
1970	1,005		−2.4%
1980	1,091		8.6%
1990	1,026		−6.0%
2000	1,095		6.7%
2010	1,024		−6.5%
2020	1,010		−1.4%
2023 (est.)	1,003	▼	−0.7%
Population sources: 1890–2000 1890–1920 1890; 1890–1910 1910–1930; 1940–2000 2000; 2010 2020

=== 2010 census ===
The 2010 United States census counted 1,024 people, 493 households, and 294 families in the borough. The population density was 878.8 per square mile (339.3/km^{2}). There were 1,043 housing units at an average density of 895.1 per square mile (345.6/km^{2}). The racial makeup was 85.84% (879) White, 8.69% (89) Black or African American, 0.78% (8) Native American, 0.20% (2) Asian, 0.00% (0) Pacific Islander, 3.13% (32) from other races, and 1.37% (14) from two or more races. Hispanic or Latino of any race were 4.98% (51) of the population.

Of the 493 households, 14.0% had children under the age of 18; 46.0% were married couples living together; 10.3% had a female householder with no husband present and 40.4% were non-families. Of all households, 36.3% were made up of individuals and 17.2% had someone living alone who was 65 years of age or older. The average household size was 2.08 and the average family size was 2.66.

12.8% of the population were under the age of 18, 6.1% from 18 to 24, 13.5% from 25 to 44, 39.2% from 45 to 64, and 28.5% who were 65 years of age or older. The median age was 55.0 years. For every 100 females, the population had 93.2 males. For every 100 females ages 18 and older there were 88.0 males.

The Census Bureau's 2006–2010 American Community Survey showed that (in 2010 inflation-adjusted dollars) median household income was $48,281 (with a margin of error of +/− $6,924) and the median family income was $51,394 (+/− $3,176). Males had a median income of $42,361 (+/− $10,529) versus $43,860 (+/− $3,583) for females. The per capita income for the borough was $34,328 (+/− $4,010). About 8.4% of families and 6.7% of the population were below the poverty line, including 8.0% of those under age 18 and 4.8% of those age 65 or over.

=== 2000 census ===
As of the 2000 United States census there were 1,095 people, 507 households, and 302 families residing in the borough. The population density was 923.5 inhabitants per square mile (356.6/km^{2}). There were 1,004 housing units at an average density of 846.8 per square mile (327.0/km^{2}). The racial makeup of the borough was 84.11% White, 14.52% African American, 0.37% Native American, 0.55% from other races, and 0.46% from two or more races. Hispanic or Latino of any race were 1.83% of the population.

There were 507 households, out of which 21.1% had children under the age of 18 living with them, 44.2% were married couples living together, 11.2% had a female householder with no husband present, and 40.4% were non-families. 35.1% of all households were made up of individuals, and 17.4% had someone living alone who was 65 years of age or older. The average household size was 2.16 and the average family size was 2.80.

In the borough the population was spread out, with 19.6% under the age of 18, 3.6% from 18 to 24, 23.7% from 25 to 44, 28.7% from 45 to 64, and 24.4% who were 65 years of age or older. The median age was 46 years. For every 100 females, there were 92.8 males. For every 100 females age 18 and over, there were 88.4 males.

The median income for a household in the borough was $37,500, and the median income for a family was $47,031. Males had a median income of $36,375 versus $29,583 for females. The per capita income for the borough was $25,663. About 4.7% of families and 7.4% of the population were below the poverty line, including 6.3% of those under age 18 and 8.9% of those age 65 or over.

=== African-Americans ===
African-Americans have been in West Cape May since the early 1800s. There is a West Cape May African-American Historical Society. Julie Lasky of The New York Times wrote that "until recently" the African-American community was "vibrant" but that by 2020 the percentage declined to 5%.

== Government ==
=== Local government ===
The Borough of West Cape May has operated under the Walsh Act form of government since 1948. The borough is one of 30 municipalities (of the 564) statewide to use the commission form of government, down from a peak of 60 early in the 20th century and with most remaining municipalities using the form being shore communities. The Board of Commissioners is comprised of three members, who are elected at-large in non-partisan elections held as part of the November general election and serve four-year, concurrent terms of office. Once the Commissioners take office, they divide up responsibility for the municipal departments, with each Commissioner serving as a Department Director and holds all the executive, administrative, judicial and legislative powers, with no single chief executive. An ordinance adopted by the Board of Commissioners in December 2012 shifted the borough's municipal elections from May to November.

As of 2024, the borough's commissioners are Mayor Carol E. Sabo (Commissioner of Revenue and Finance), Deputy Mayor George Dick (Commissioner of Public Works, Parks and Public Property; elected to serve an unexpired term) and Giacomo "Jack" Antonicello (Commissioner of Public Affairs and Public Safety; elected to serve an unexpired term), who are all serving concurrent terms of office that end December 31, 2025.

In October 2022, Alan Crawford was appointed to fill the seat vacated by Peter C. Burke the previous month. In January 2023, George Dick was appointed to fill the vacant seat as commissioner that had been held by Daniel M. Kurkowski until he resigned from office the previous month. Dick served on an interim basis until November 2023 general election, when he and Giacomo "Jack" Antonicello were elected to serve the remainder of the terms of office expiring in December 2025.

Carol Sabo was appointed in early 2013 to fill the vacant seat of Ramsay Geyer, who had resigned to move out of the borough. Kaithern, Burke and Sabo were all re-elected in November 2013.

=== Federal, state and county representation ===
West Cape May is located in the 2nd Congressional District and is part of New Jersey's 1st state legislative district.

For the 119th United States Congress, New Jersey's 2nd congressional district is represented by Jeff Van Drew (R, Dennis Township). New Jersey is represented in the United States Senate by Democrats Cory Booker (Newark, term ends 2027) and Andy Kim (Moorestown, term ends 2031).

For the 2026–2027 session, the 1st legislative district of the New Jersey Legislature is represented in the State Senate by Mike Testa (R, Vineland) and in the General Assembly by Antwan McClellan (R, Ocean City) and Erik K. Simonsen (R, Lower Township).

Cape May County is governed by a five-person Board of County Commissioners whose members are elected at-large on a partisan basis to three-year terms of office on a staggered basis, with either one or two seats coming up for election each year; At an annual reorganization held each January, the commissioners select one member to serve as director and another to serve as vice-director. As of 2026, Cape May County's Commissioners are Director Leonard C. Desiderio (R, Sea Isle City, term as commissioner ends December 31, 2027; term as director ends 2026), Vice-Director Andrew Bulakowski (R, Lower Township; term as commissioner ends 2028; term as vice-director ends 2026). Robert Barr (R, Ocean City; 2028) and Will Morey (R, Wildwood Crest; 2026), with one seat expiring in December 2026 vacant after Melanie Collette resigned from office in March 2026. The county's constitutional officers are Clerk Rita Marie Rothberg (R, Ocean City; 2030), Sheriff Robert Nolan (R, Lower Township; 2026) and Surrogate E. Marie Hayes (R, Ocean City; 2028).

=== Politics ===
As of March 2011, there were a total of 776 registered voters in West Cape May, of which 249 (32.1%) were registered as Democrats, 284 (36.6%) were registered as Republicans and 241 (31.1%) were registered as Unaffiliated. There were 2 voters registered as either Libertarians or Greens.

Gubernatorial election results for West Cape May
Year	Republican		Democratic		Third party(ies)	
Year	No.	%	No.	%	No.	%
2025	278	41.87%	383	57.68%	3	0.45%
2021	253	43.40%	325	55.75%	5	0.86%
2017	192	34.04%	333	59.04%	39	6.91%
2013	329	59.82%	207	37.64%	14	2.55%
2009	183	39.61%	245	53.03%	34	7.36%
2005	194	39.59%	274	55.92%	22	4.49%

In the 2012 presidential election, Democrat Barack Obama received 61.0% of the vote (385 cast), ahead of Republican Mitt Romney with 37.2% (235 votes), and other candidates with 1.7% (11 votes), among the 640 ballots cast by the borough's 830 registered voters (9 ballots were spoiled), for a turnout of 77.1%. In the 2008 presidential election, Democrat Barack Obama received 62.9% of the vote (387 cast), ahead of Republican John McCain, who received 35.0% (215 votes), with 615 ballots cast among the borough's 752 registered voters, for a turnout of 81.8%. In the 2004 presidential election, Democrat John Kerry received 60.5% of the vote (377 ballots cast), outpolling Republican George W. Bush, who received around 38.5% (240 votes), with 623 ballots cast among the borough's 818 registered voters, for a turnout percentage of 76.2.

Presidential elections results
Year	Republican	Democratic
2024	40.0% 283	58.3% 413
2020	37.9% 276	61.1% 445
2016	38.0% 234	57.6% 354
2012	37.2% 235	61.0% 385
2008	35.0% 215	62.9% 387
2004	38.5% 240	60.5% 377

In the 2013 gubernatorial election, Republican Chris Christie received 59.8% of the vote (329 cast), ahead of Democrat Barbara Buono with 37.6% (207 votes), and other candidates with 2.5% (14 votes), among the 582 ballots cast by the borough's 816 registered voters (32 ballots were spoiled), for a turnout of 71.3%. In the 2009 gubernatorial election, Democrat Jon Corzine received 52.2% of the vote (245 ballots cast), ahead of both Republican Chris Christie with 39.0% (183 votes) and Independent Chris Daggett with 6.0% (28 votes), with 469 ballots cast among the borough's 778 registered voters, yielding a 60.3% turnout.

United States Senate election results for West Cape May1
Year	Republican		Democratic		Third party(ies)	
Year	No.	%	No.	%	No.	%
2024	324	46.42%	370	53.01%	4	0.57%
2018	242	43.53%	299	53.78%	15	2.70%
2012	217	37.87%	343	59.86%	13	2.27%
2006	181	39.87%	262	57.71%	11	2.42%

United States Senate election results for West Cape May2
Year	Republican		Democratic		Third party(ies)	
Year	No.	%	No.	%	No.	%
2020	256	36.26%	439	62.18%	11	1.56%
2014	163	38.90%	250	59.67%	6	1.43%
2013	96	32.00%	201	67.00%	3	1.00%
2008	200	35.65%	352	62.75%	9	1.60%

== Education ==
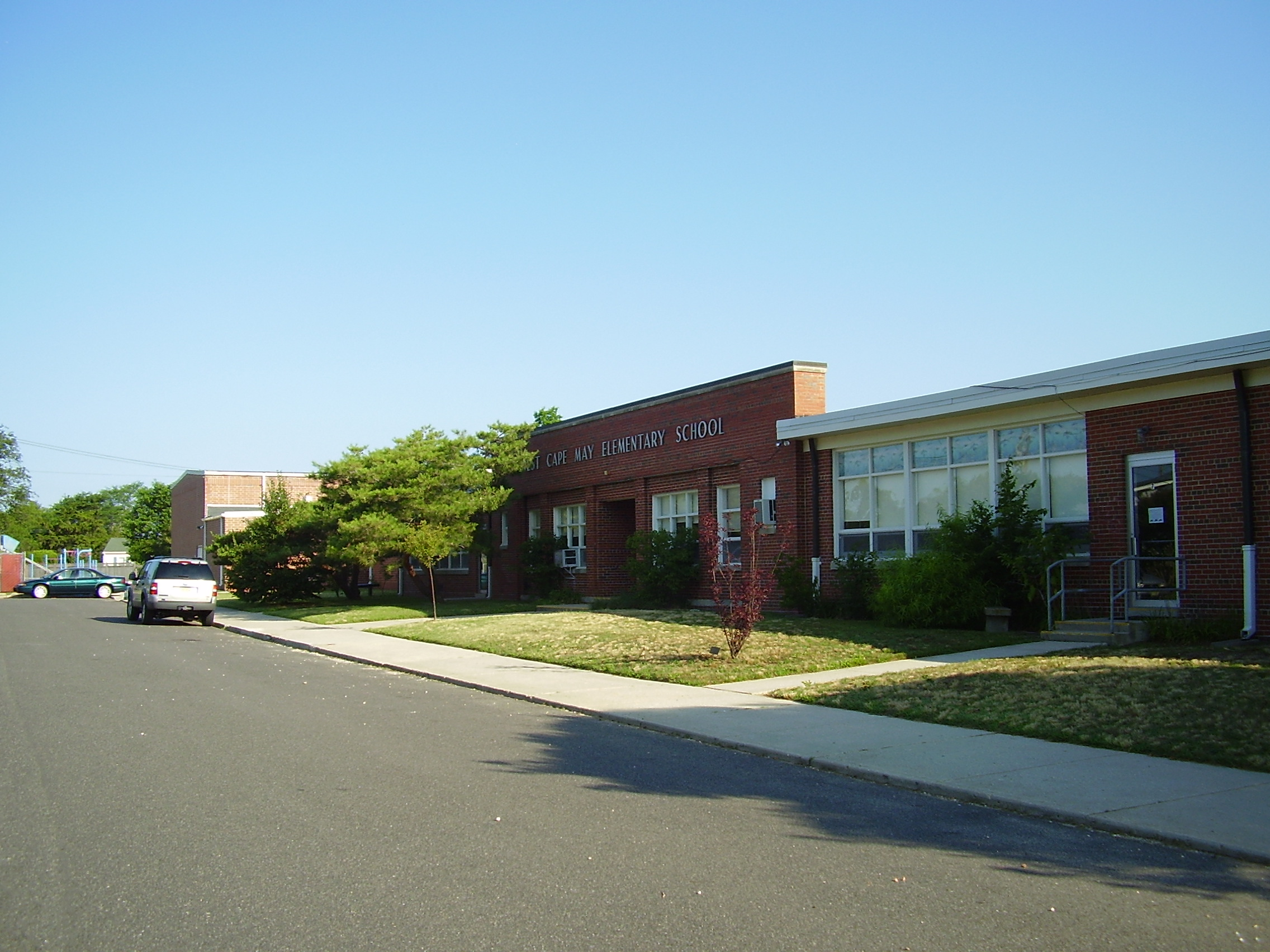
West Cape May Elementary School

The West Cape May School District serves students in pre-kindergarten through sixth grade at West Cape May Elementary School. As of the 2024–25 school year, the district, comprised of one school, had an enrollment of 86 students and 9.7 classroom teachers (on an FTE basis), for a student–teacher ratio of 8.9:1. In the 2016–17 school year, the district had 98 students, making it the eighth-smallest district in the state.

For seventh through twelfth grades, public school students attend the schools of the Lower Cape May Regional School District, which serves students from Cape May, Lower Township and West Cape May, along with students from Cape May Point who attend as part of a sending/receiving relationship. Schools in the district (with 2024–25 enrollment data from the National Center for Education Statistics) are Richard M. Teitelman Middle School with 394 students in grades 7–8 and Lower Cape May Regional High School with 717 students in grades 9–12. The high school district's board of education is comprised of nine members, who are elected directly by voters to serve three-year terms of office on a staggered basis, with three seats up for election each year. Seats on the board are allocated based on population, with West Cape May assigned one seat.

Students are also eligible to attend Cape May County Technical High School in Cape May Court House, which serves students from the entire county in its comprehensive and vocational programs, which are offered without charge to students who are county residents. Special needs students may be referred to Cape May County Special Services School District in the Cape May Court House area.

=== History ===
Previously a West Cape May High School existed. In an era of de jure educational segregation in the United States normally only white students were permitted to attend though the state made exceptions. Ordinarily black students attended a different industrial high school. The district maintained separate white and black elementary schools.

== Transportation ==
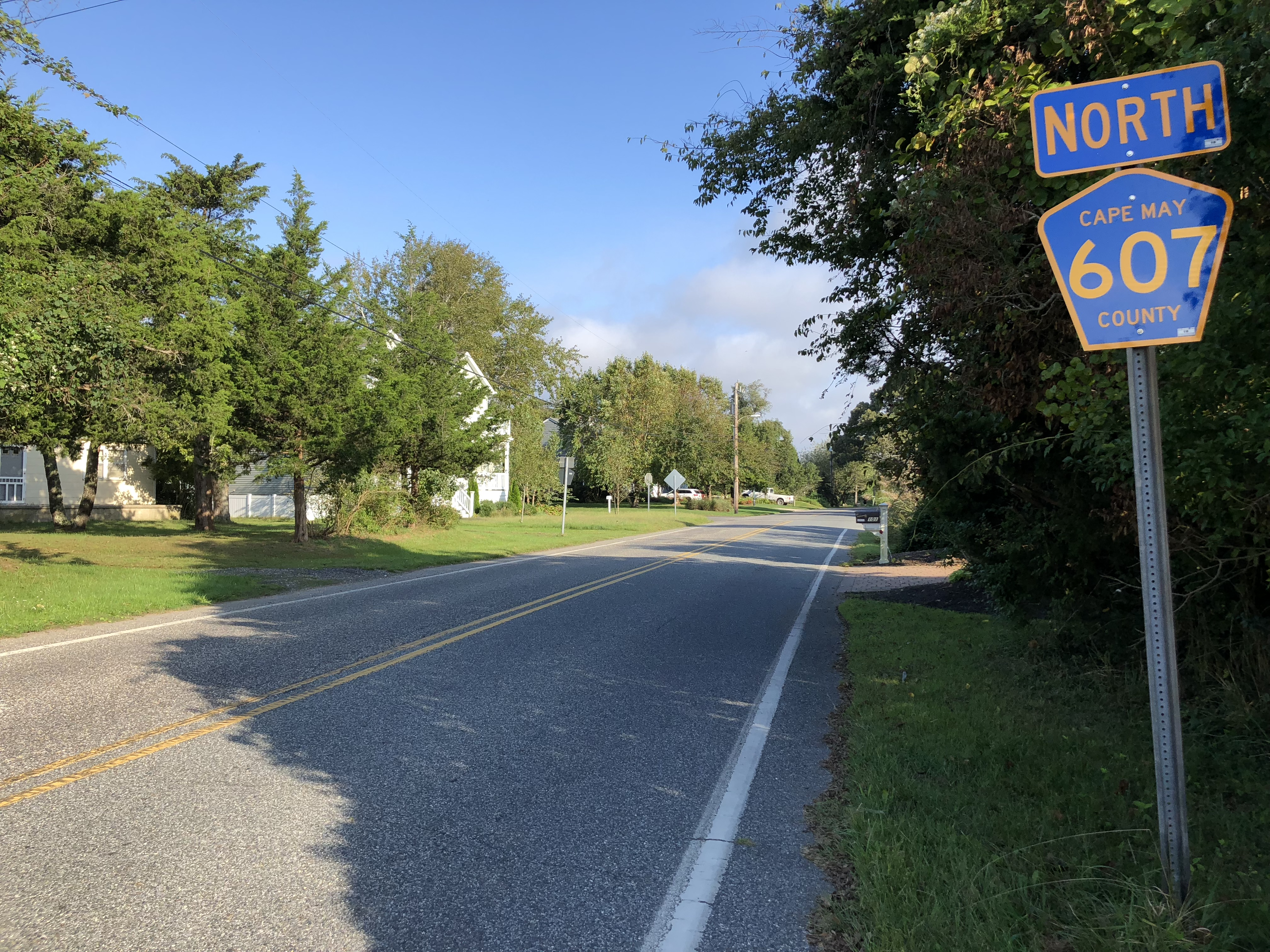
County Route 607 in West Cape May

=== Roads and highways ===
As of May 2010, the borough had a total of 11.87 miles (19.10 km) of roadways, of which 8.82 miles (14.19 km) were maintained by the municipality and 3.05 miles (4.91 km) by Cape May County.

No Interstate, U.S., state or major county highways serve West Cape May. The most significant roads in the borough are minor county routes, such as County Route 607.

=== Public transportation ===
NJ Transit offers bus service between Cape May and Atlantic City on the 552 route.

== Parks and recreation ==
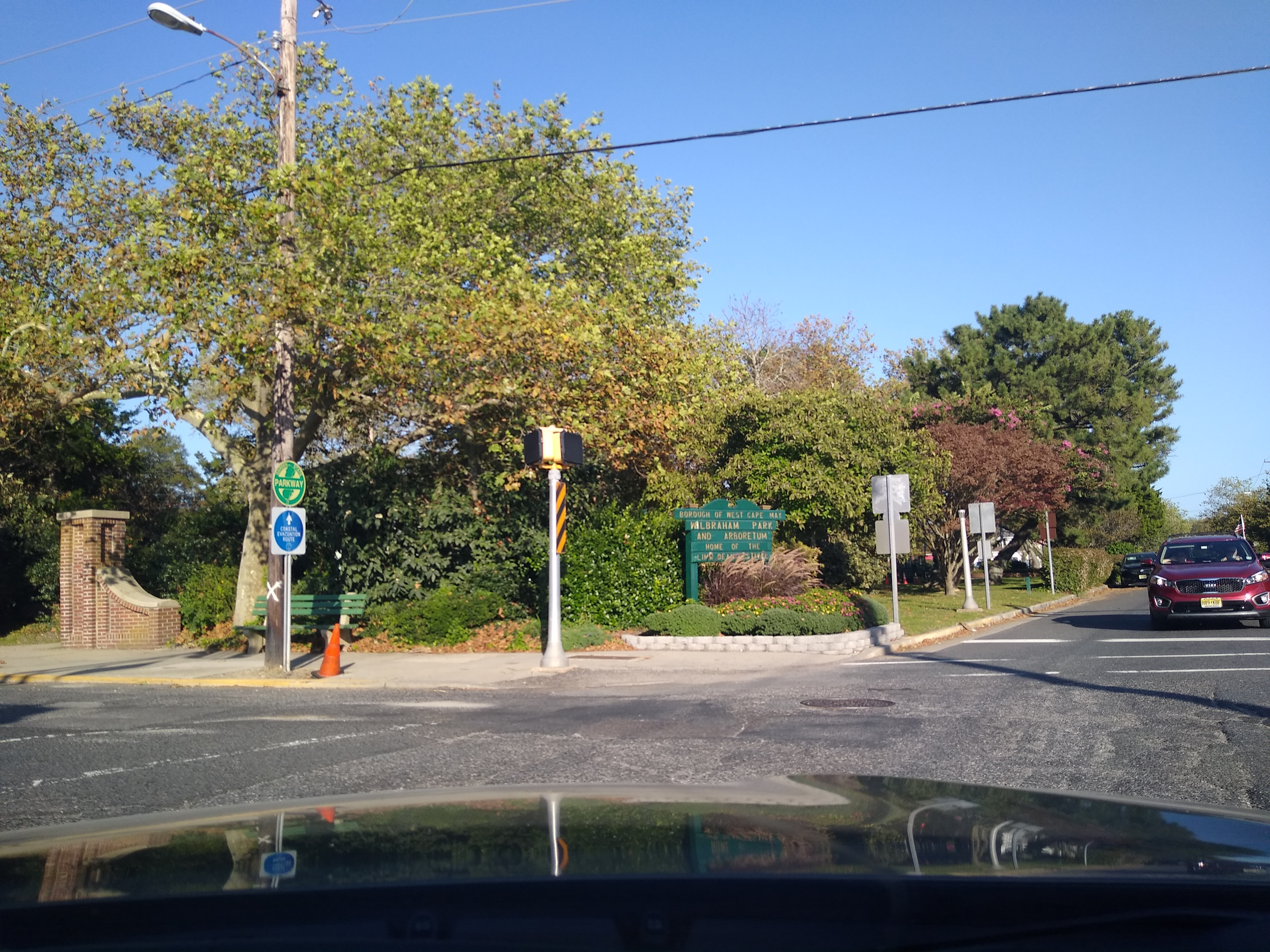
Wilbraham Park

Wilbraham Park is in West Cape May. Every October the lima bean festival is held in that park. There is also a strawberry festival in West Cape May, sponsored by the West Cape May Business Association.

== Wineries ==
- Willow Creek Winery
