= New Jersey legislative districts, 2001 apportionment =

New Jersey Legislature
- 210th through 214th Legislatures

Type
- Type: Bicameral
- Houses: Senate; General Assembly

History
- Founded: January 8, 2002
- Disbanded: January 10, 2012
- Preceded by: 1991 apportionment
- Succeeded by: 2011 apportionment

Structure
- Seats: 120
- Political groups: Democratic Party; Republican Party

Meeting place
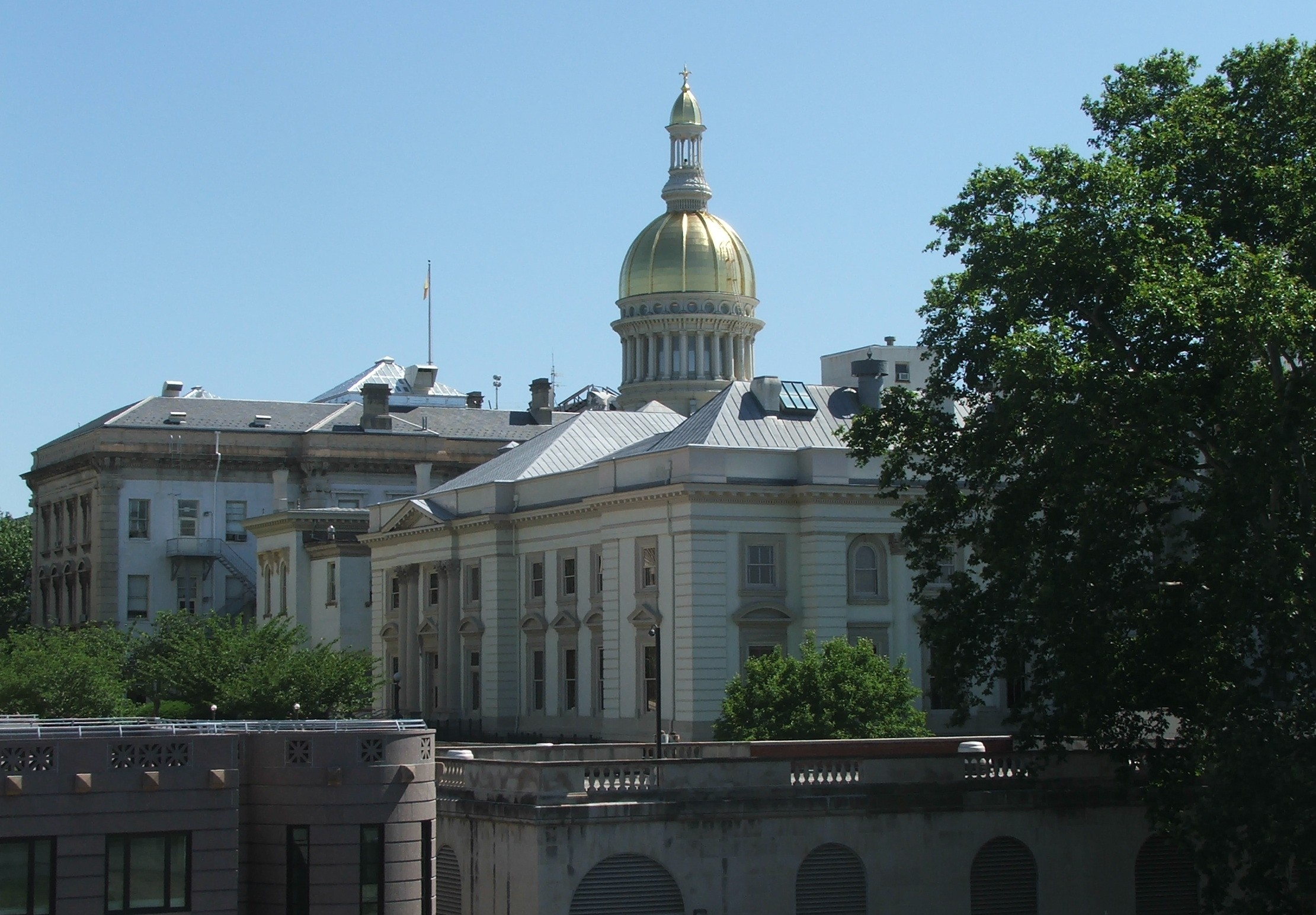
- New Jersey State House, Trenton, New Jersey

Website
- njleg.state.nj.us

as per 2001 redistricting

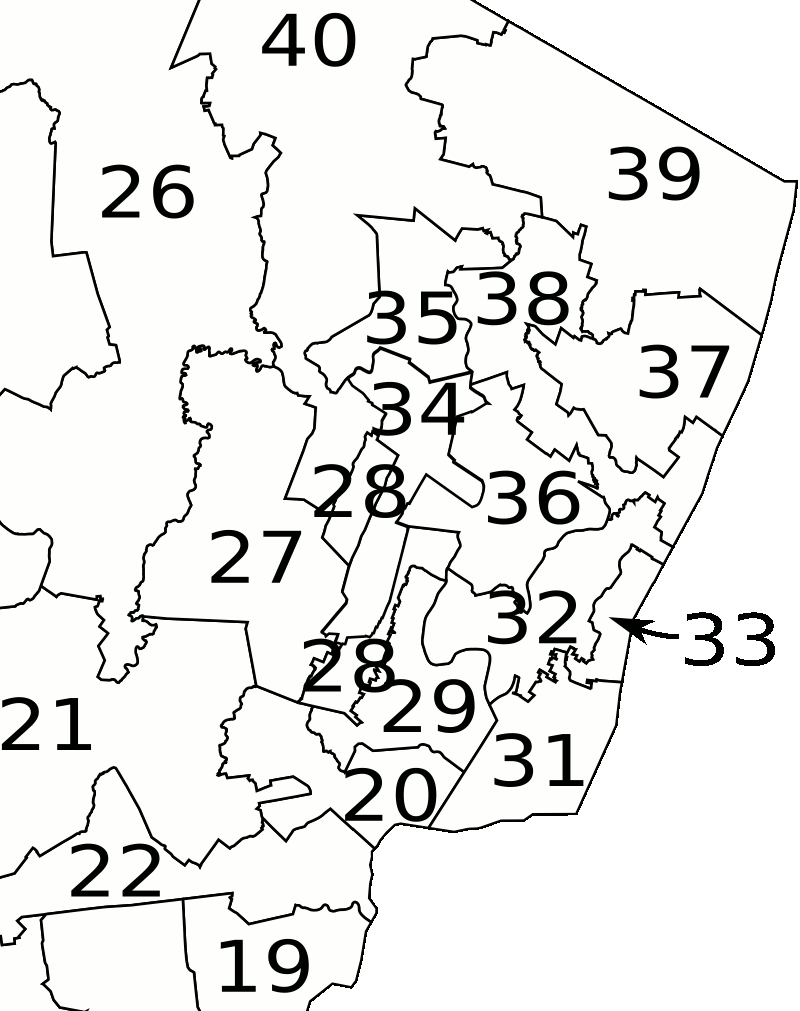
detail of northeastern portion

The members of the New Jersey Legislature are chosen from 40 electoral districts. Each district elects one senator and two assemblymen.

New Jersey is one of only seven states with nested state legislative districts, in which the lower house's districts are coextensive with a single state Senate seat. In New Jersey, each district elects one Senator and two Assembly members. (States which have similar practices are Arizona, Idaho, Maryland, North Dakota, South Dakota and Washington).

Districts are reapportioned decennially by the New Jersey Apportionment Commission following each United States census, as provided by Article IV, Section III of the state Constitution.

The legislative districts listed below went into effect with the swearing in of the 210th Legislature in 2002. They were used for regular elections from 2001 through 2009 (special elections through 2010), following the 2000 United States census. The November 2011 elections were held for representatives of districts defined in the 2011 apportionment.

== District 1 ==
Avalon, Buena, Buena Vista Township, Cape May, Cape May Point, Dennis, Lower Township, Maurice River Township, Middle Township, Millville, North Wildwood, Ocean City, Sea Isle City, Somers Point, Stone Harbor, Upper Township, Vineland, West Cape May, West Wildwood, Wildwood, Wildwood Crest, Woodbine

== District 2 ==
Absecon, Atlantic City, Brigantine, Corbin City, Egg Harbor City, Egg Harbor Township, Estell Manor, Galloway, Hamilton Township, Linwood, Longport, Margate City, Mullica, Northfield , Pleasantville, Port Republic, Ventnor City, Weymouth Township

== District 3 ==
Alloway Township, Bridgeton, Carneys Point Township, Clayton, Commercial Township, Deerfield Township, Downe Township, East Greenwich Township, Elk Township, Elmer, Elsinboro Township, Fairfield Township, Greenwich Township (Cumberland), Greenwich Township (Gloucester), Harrison Township, Hopewell Township, Lawrence Township, Logan Township, Lower Alloways Creek Township, Mannington Township, Mantua Township, National Park Borough, Oldmans Township, Paulsboro, Penns Grove, Pennsville Township, Pilesgrove Township, Pittsgrove Township, Quinton Township, Salem, Shiloh, South Harrison Township, Stow Creek Township, Swedesboro, Upper Deerfield Township, Upper Pittsgrove Township, Wenonah, West Deptford Township, Woodstown, Woolwich Township

== District 4 ==
Clementon, Franklin Township, Glassboro, Gloucester Township, Laurel Springs, Lindenwold, Monroe Township, Newfield, Pitman, Washington Township

== District 5 ==
Audubon, Barrington, Bellmawr, Brooklawn, Camden, Deptford Township, Gloucester City, Haddon Heights, Hi-Nella, Lawnside, Magnolia, Mount Ephraim, Runnemede, Somerdale, Stratford, Westville, Woodbury, Woodbury Heights, Woodlynne

== District 6 ==
Audubon Park, Berlin, Berlin Township, Cherry Hill Township, Chesilhurst, Collingswood, Gibbsboro, Haddon Township, Haddonfield, Oaklyn, Pine Hill, Pine Valley, Tavistock, Voorhees Township, Waterford Township, Winslow Township

== District 7 ==
Beverly, Burlington, Burlington Township, Cinnaminson Township, Delanco Township, Delran Township, Edgewater Park Township, Florence Township, Maple Shade Township, Merchantville, Mount Holly Township, Palmyra, Pennsauken Township, Riverside Township, Riverton, Westampton Township, Willingboro Township

== District 8 ==
Eastampton Township, Evesham Township, Hainesport Township, Lumberton Township, Mansfield Township, Medford Lakes, Medford Township, Moorestown Township, Mount Laurel Township, Pemberton, Pemberton Township, Shamong Township, Southampton Township, Springfield Township, Tabernacle, Woodland, Wrightstown

== District 9 ==
Barnegat Light, Barnegat Township, Bass River Township, Beach Haven, Beachwood, Berkeley Township, Eagleswood Township, Folsom, Hammonton, Harvey Cedars, Lacey Township, Lakehurst, Little Egg Harbor Township, Long Beach Township, Manchester Township, Ocean Gate, Ocean Township, Pine Beach, Ship Bottom, Stafford Township, Surf City, Tuckerton, Washington Township

== District 10 ==
Bay Head, Brick Township, Island Heights, Lavallette, Manasquan, Mantoloking, Point Pleasant Beach, Point Pleasant, Seaside Heights, Seaside Park, South Toms River, Toms River

== District 11 ==
Allenhurst, Asbury Park, Atlantic Highlands, Avon-by-the-Sea, Belmar, Bradley Beach, Brielle, Deal, Eatontown, Highlands, Interlaken, Lake Como, Loch Arbour, Long Branch, Monmouth Beach, Neptune City, Neptune Township, Ocean Township, Rumson, Sea Bright, Sea Girt, Spring Lake, Spring Lake Heights, Wall, West Long Branch

== District 12 ==
Colts Neck Township, East Windsor Township, Englishtown, Fair Haven, Freehold Borough, Freehold Township, Hightstown, Little Silver, Manalapan Township, Millstone Township, Oceanport, Red Bank, Shrewsbury, Shrewsbury Township, Tinton Falls

== District 13 ==
Aberdeen Township, Hazlet Township, Holmdel Township, Keansburg, Keyport, Marlboro Township, Matawan, Middletown Township, Old Bridge, Union Beach

== District 14 ==
Cranbury, Hamilton Township, Jamesburg, Monroe Township, Plainsboro, South Brunswick, West Windsor Township

== District 15 ==
Ewing Township, Hopewell, Hopewell Township, Lawrence Township, Pennington, Princeton Borough, Princeton Township, Trenton

== District 16 ==
Bedminster Township, Bernards Township, Bernardsville, Bound Brook, Branchburg Township, Bridgewater Township, Far Hills, Hillsborough Township, Manville, Mendham, Millstone, Montgomery Township, Peapack-Gladstone, Raritan, Rocky Hill, Somerville, South Bound Brook

== District 17 ==
Franklin Township, Highland Park, Milltown, New Brunswick, North Brunswick, Piscataway

== District 18 ==
East Brunswick Township, Edison, Helmetta, Metuchen, South Plainfield, South River, Spotswood

== District 19 ==
Carteret, Perth Amboy, Sayreville, South Amboy, Woodbridge

== District 20 ==
Elizabeth, Kenilworth, Roselle, Union Township

== District 21 ==
Berkeley Heights Township, Chatham Township, Cranford, Garwood, Harding Township, Long Hill Township, Madison, Millburn Township, Mountainside, New Providence, Roselle Park, Springfield Township, Summit, Warren Township, Watchung, Westfield

== District 22 ==
Clark, Dunellen, Fanwood, Green Brook Township, Linden, Middlesex, North Plainfield, Plainfield, Rahway, Scotch Plains, Winfield Township

== District 23 ==
Alexandria Township, Allamuchy Township, Alpha, Belvidere, Bethlehem Township, Blairstown Township, Bloomsbury, Clinton, Clinton Township, Delaware Township, East Amwell Township, Flemington, Franklin Township (Hunterdon County), Franklin Township (Warren County), Frelinghuysen Township, Frenchtown, Glen Gardner, Greenwich Township, Hackettstown, Hampton, Hardwick Township, Harmony Township, High Bridge Borough, Holland Township, Hope Township, Independence Township, Kingwood Township, Knowlton Township, Lambertvill, Lebanon, Lebanon Township, Liberty Township, Lopatcong Township, Mansfield Township, Milford, Oxford Township, Phillipsburg, Pohatcong Township, Raritan Township, Readington Township, Stockton, Union Township, Washington, Washington Township, West Amwell Township, White Township

== District 24 ==
Andover, Andover Township, Branchville, Byram Township, Califon, Chester, Chester Township, Frankford Township, Franklin, Fredon Township, Green Township, Hamburg, Hampton Township, Hardyston Township, Hopatcong, Lafayette Township, Montague Township, Mount Olive Township, Netcong, Newton, Ogdensburg, Sandyston Township, Sparta Township, Stanhope, Stillwater Township, Sussex, Tewksbury Township, Vernon Township, Walpack Township, Wantage Township, Washington Township

== District 25 ==
Boonton, Boonton Township, Denville Township, Dover, Jefferson Township, Mendham Township, Mine Hill Township, Morris Township, Morristown, Mount Arlington, Mountain Lakes, Randolph Township, Rockaway, Rockaway Township, Roxbury Township, Victory Gardens, Wharton

== District 26 ==
Bloomingdale, Butler, Chatham, East Hanover Township, Florham Park, Hanover Township, Kinnelon, Lincoln Park, Montville Township, Morris Plains, Parsippany-Troy Hills, Pequannock Township, Pompton Lakes, Riverdale, West Milford Township

== District 27 ==
Caldwell, Essex Fells, Fairfield Township, Livingston, Maplewood, Newark (partial), North Caldwell, Orange, Roseland, South Orange, West Caldwell, West Orange

== District 28 ==
Belleville, Bloomfield, Irvington, Newark (partial)

== District 29 ==
Hillside, Newark (partial)

== District 30 ==
Allentown, Bordentown, Bordentown Township, Chesterfield Township, Farmingdale, Fieldsboro, Howell Township, Jackson Township, Lakewood Township, New Hanover Township, North Hanover Township, Plumsted Township, Roosevelt, Upper Freehold Township, Robbinsville Township

== District 31 ==
Bayonne, Jersey City (partial)

== District 32 ==
East Newark, Fairview, Harrison, Jersey City (partial), Kearny, North Bergen, Secaucus

== District 33 ==
Guttenberg, Hoboken, Jersey City (partial), Union City, Weehawken, West New York

== District 34 ==
Clifton, East Orange, Glen Ridge, Montclair, Woodland Park

== District 35 ==
Glen Rock, Haledon, Hawthorne, North Haledon, Paterson, Prospect Park,

== District 36 ==
Carlstadt, East Rutherford, Garfield, Lyndhurst, Moonachie, North Arlington, Nutley, Passaic, Rutherford, Wallington, Wood-Ridge

== District 37 ==
Bergenfield, Bogota, Englewood, Englewood Cliffs, Hackensack, Leonia, Maywood, Palisades Park, Ridgefield Park, Rochelle Park, Teaneck, Tenafly

== District 38 ==
Cliffside Park, Edgewater, Elmwood Park, Fair Lawn, Fort Lee, Hasbrouck Heights, Little Ferry, Lodi, Paramus, Ridgefield, Saddle Brook, South Hackensack, Teterboro

== District 39 ==
Allendale, Alpine, Closter, Cresskill, Demarest, Dumont, Emerson, Harrington Park, Haworth, Hillsdale, Ho-Ho-Kus, Montvale, New Milford , Northvale, Norwood, Old Tappan, Oradell, Park Ridge, Ramsey, River Edge, River Vale, Rockleigh, Saddle River, Upper Saddle River, Waldwick, Washington Township, Westwood, Woodcliff Lake,

== District 40 ==
Cedar Grove, Franklin Lakes, Little Falls, Mahwah, Midland Park, Oakland, Pequannock, Ridgewood, Ringwood, Totowa, Verona, Wanaque, Wayne, Woodland Park, Wyckoff
