= 1876 New Jersey Senate election =

- November 7, 1876

6 of the 21 seats in the New Jersey State Senate 11 seats needed for a majority
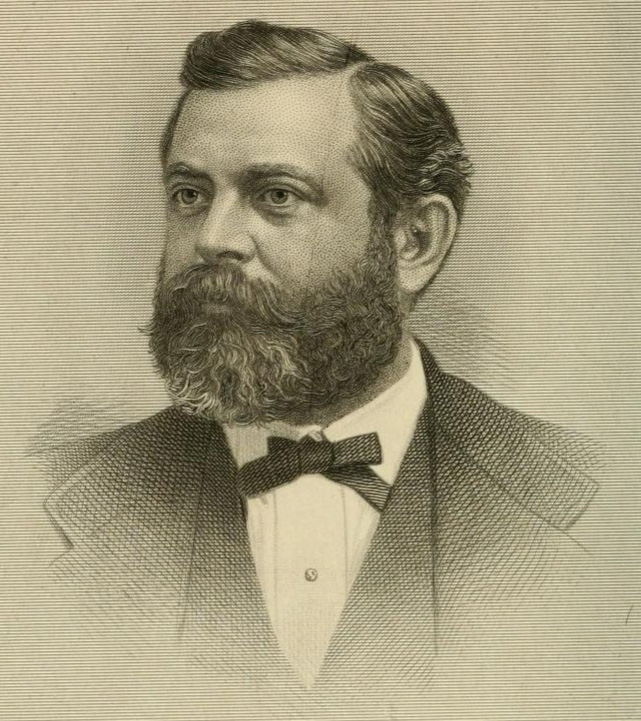

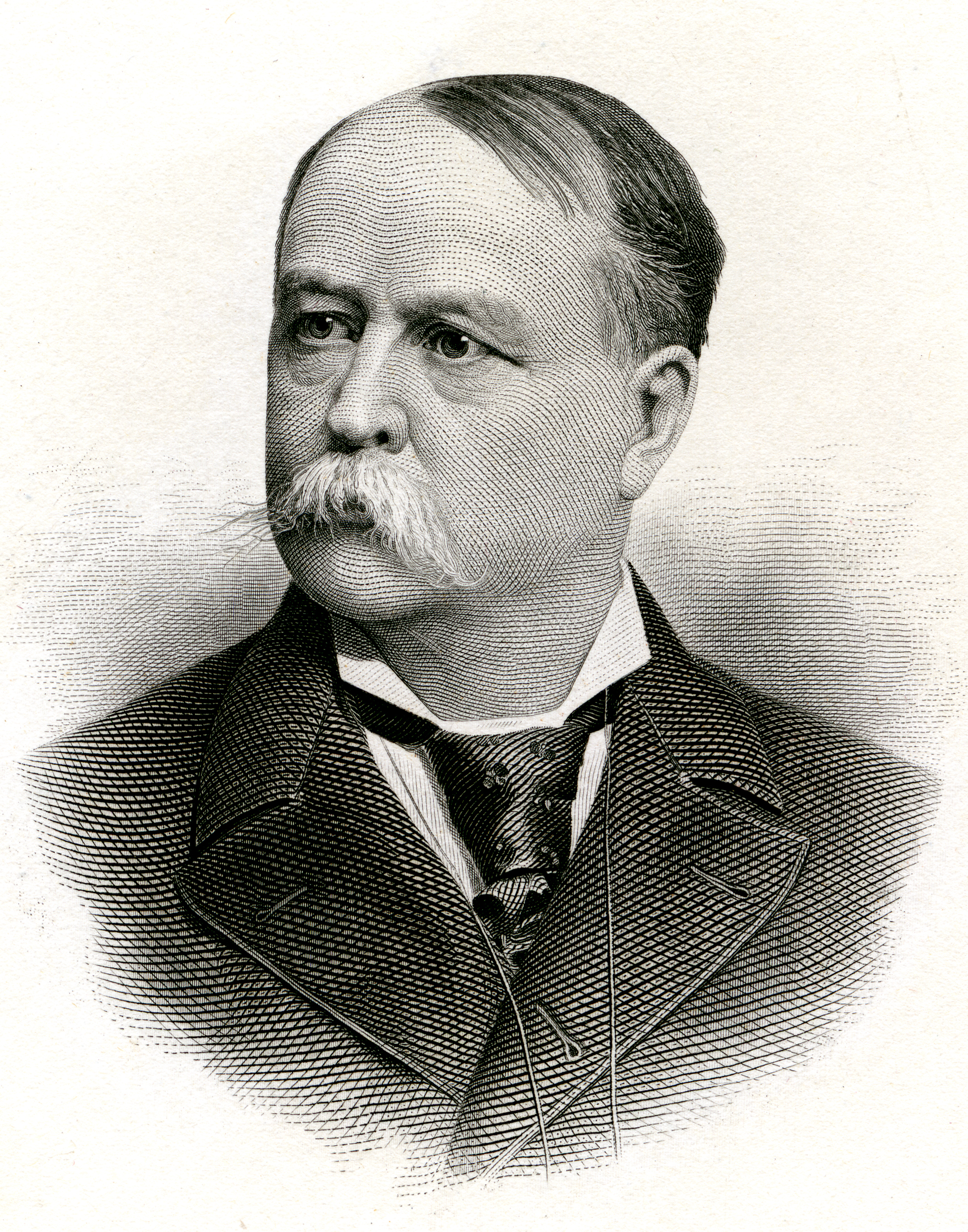
| | Majority party | Minority party |
|---|---|---|
| Leader | Leon Abbett | William J. Sewell |
| Party | Democratic | Republican |
| Leader's seat | Hudson County | Camden County |
| Seats before | 9 | 12 |
| Seats after | 11 | 10 |
| Seat change | ▲2 | ▼2 |
| Popular vote | 27,075 | 24,377 |
| Percentage | 52.59% | 47.35% |
| Seats up | 2 | 4 |
| Races won | 4 | 2 |
- Results by district Democratic hold Democratic gain Republican hold Republican gain No election
Senate President before election
William J. Sewell
Republican
Elected Senate President
Leon Abbett
Democratic

The 1876 New Jersey Senate election was held on November 7, 1876, to elect six of the 21 members of the New Jersey Senate that were up for election. Under the 1844 New Jersey Constitution, each county was apportioned one Senate seat.

Democrats picked up the Burlington, Hunterdon, and Middlesex county seats, while Republican candidate and future Vice President Garret Hobart flipped the Passaic County seat. This led to an 11-10 majority for the Democrats, who elected Leon Abbett as the next president of the Senate.

== Summary of results by county ==
| County | Incumbent | Party | Elected Senator | Party |
|---|---|---|---|---|
| Atlantic | Hosea F. Madden | Dem | No election | |
| Bergen | George Dayton | Dem | No election | |
| Burlington | Barton F. Thorn | Rep | Caleb G. Ridgway | Dem |
| Camden | W. J. Sewell | Rep | No election | |
| Cape May | Richard S. Leaming | Rep | Jonathan F. Leaming | Rep |
| Cumberland | J. Howard Willets | Rep | No election | |
| Essex | William H. Kirk | Rep | No election | |
| Gloucester | Thomas B. Mathers | Rep | No election | |
| Hudson | Leon Abbett | Dem | No election | |
| Hunterdon | Frederic A. Potts | Rep | James N. Pidcock | Dem |
| Mercer | Jonathan H. Blackwell | Dem | No election | |
| Middlesex | Levi D. Jarrard | Rep | George C. Ludlow | Dem |
| Monmouth | William Hendrickson | Dem | No election | |
| Morris | John Hill | Rep | No election | |
| Ocean | John S. Schultze | Rep | No election | |
| Passaic | John Hopper | Dem | Garret Hobart | Rep |
| Salem | Chas. S. Plummer | Rep | No election | |
| Somerset | Charles B. Moore | Dem | No election | |
| Sussex | Samuel T. Smith | Dem | Frank M. Ward | Dem |
| Union | William J. Magie | Rep | No election | |
| Warren | William Silverthorn | Dem | No election | |

=== Closest races ===
Seats where the margin of victory was under 10%:

1. Burlington County, 0.63% (gain)
2. Cape May County, 4.36%
3. Middlesex County, 7.12% (gain)
4. Passaic County, 8.14% (gain)

=== Other gains ===
Seats that flipped party control where the margin of victory was over 10%:

1. Hunterdon County, 17.98% (gain)

== Detailed results ==
=== Burlington ===
1876 general election
| Party | Candidate | Votes | % |
|---|---|---|---|
| Democratic | Caleb G. Ridgway | 6,464 | 50.20% |
| Republican | Barton F. Thorn (incumbent) | 6,383 | 49.57% |
| Temperance Party | James H. Parks | 30 | 0.23% |
| Total votes | | 12,877 | 100.00% |
| Democratic gain from Republican | | | |

=== Cape May ===
1876 general election
| Party | Candidate | Votes | % |
|---|---|---|---|
| Republican | Jonathan F. Leaming | 995 | 52.18% |
| Democratic | Richard D. Edmunds | 912 | 47.82% |
| Total votes | | 1,907 | 100.00% |
| Republican hold | | | |

=== Hunterdon ===
1876 general election
| Party | Candidate | Votes | % |
|---|---|---|---|
| Democratic | James N. Pidcock | 5,497 | 58.99% |
| Republican | Lewis H. Taylor | 3,822 | 41.01% |
| Total votes | | 9,319 | 100.00% |
| Democratic gain from Republican | | | |

=== Middlesex ===
1876 general election
| Party | Candidate | Votes | % |
|---|---|---|---|
| Democratic | George C. Ludlow | 5,890 | 53.56% |
| Republican | Levi D. Jarrard (incumbent) | 5,108 | 46.44% |
| Total votes | | 10,998 | 100.00% |
| Democratic gain from Republican | | | |

=== Passaic ===
1876 general election
| Party | Candidate | Votes | % |
|---|---|---|---|
| Republican | Garret Hobart | 5,913 | 54.07% |
| Democratic | Charles Inglis | 5,022 | 45.93% |
| Total votes | | 10,935 | 100.00% |
| Republican gain from Democratic | | | |

=== Sussex ===
1876 general election
| Party | Candidate | Votes | % |
|---|---|---|---|
| Democratic | Frank M. Ward | 3,290 | 60.41% |
| Republican | Franklin Smith | 2,156 | 39.59% |
| Total votes | | 5,446 | 100.00% |
| Democratic hold | | | |
