= 1873 New Jersey Senate election =

1873 New Jersey Senate elections
- November 1873

6 of the 21 seats in the New Jersey State Senate 11 seats needed for a majority
	Majority party	Minority party
Party	Republican	Democratic
Seats before	13	8
Seats after	14	7
Seat change	▲1	▼1
Popular vote	19,173	18,642
Percentage	50.22%	48.83%
Seats up	3	3
Races won	4	2
- Results by district Democratic hold Republican hold Republican gain No election
Senate President before election
John W. Taylor
Republican
Elected Senate President
John W. Taylor
Republican

The 1873 New Jersey State Senate elections were held in November. Under the 1844 New Jersey Constitution, each county was apportioned one Senate seat.

The elections took place during the final year of Governor Joel Parker's second non-consecutive term in office. Republicans gained the Hunterdon County seat.

== Incumbents not running for re-election ==
=== Democratic ===
- David H. Banghart (Hunterdon)
- Henry A. Williams (Passaic)
- Richard E. Edsall (Sussex)

=== Republican ===
- Henry J. Irick (Burlington)
- Thomas Beesley Sr. (Cape May)

== Summary of results by county ==
County	Incumbent	Party	Elected Senator	Party
Atlantic	William Moore	Rep	No election	
Bergen	Cornelius Lydecker	Dem	No election	
Burlington	Henry J. Irick	Rep	Barton F. Thorn	Rep
Camden	W. J. Sewell	Rep	No election	
Cape May	Thomas Beesley Sr.	Rep	Richard S. Leaming	Rep
Cumberland	Caleb Henry Sheppard	Rep	No election	
Essex	John W. Taylor	Rep	No election	
Gloucester	Samuel Hopkins	Rep	No election	
Hudson	John R. McPherson	Dem	No election	
Hunterdon	David H. Banghart	Dem	Frederic A. Potts	Rep
Mercer	Charles Hewitt	Rep	No election	
Middlesex	Levi D. Jarrard	Rep	Levi D. Jarrard	Rep
Monmouth	William H. Hendrickson	Dem	No election	
Morris	Augustus W. Cutler	Dem	No election	
Ocean	John G. W. Havens	Rep	No election	
Passaic	Henry A. Williams	Dem	John Hopper	Dem
Salem	Isaac Newkirk	Rep	No election	
Somerset	Elisha B. Wood	Rep	No election	
Sussex	Richard E. Edsall	Dem	Samuel T. Smith	Dem
Union	J. Henry Stone	Rep	No election	
Warren	Joseph B. Cornish	Dem	No election	

=== Close races ===
Seats where the margin of victory was under 10%:

1. Passaic, 0.36%
2. Middlesex, 1.98%
3. Burlington, 3.4%
4. Hunterdon, 5.58% gain

== Burlington ==
1873 general election
Party	Candidate	Votes	%	±%
Republican	Barton F. Thorn	4,940	49.86%	
Democratic	French	4,603	46.46%	
Independent	Unknown	365	3.68%	
Total votes		9,908	100.0%	

== Cape May ==
1873 general election
Party	Candidate	Votes	%	±%
Republican	Richard S. Leaming	887	70.73%	
Democratic	Miller	367	29.27%	
Total votes		1,254	100.0%	

== Hunterdon ==
1873 general election
Party	Candidate	Votes	%	±%
Republican	Frederic A. Potts	3,666	52.79%	
Democratic	James N. Pidcock	3,279	47.21%	
Total votes		6,945	100.0%	

== Middlesex ==
1873 general election
Party	Candidate	Votes	%	±%
Republican	Levi D. Jarrard (incumbent)	4,388	50.99%	
Democratic	Letson	4,218	49.01%	
Total votes		8,606	100.0%	

== Passaic ==
1873 general election
Party	Candidate	Votes	%	±%
Democratic	John Hopper	3,778	50.18%	
Republican	Carr	3,751	49.82%	
Total votes		7,529	100.0%	

== Sussex ==
1873 general election
Party	Candidate	Votes	%	±%
Democratic	Samuel T. Smith	2,397	60.87%	
Republican	Huston	1,541	39.13%	
Total votes		3,938	100.0%	

== See also ==
- List of New Jersey state legislatures
