= 1874 New Jersey Senate election =

- November 3, 1874

7 of the 21 seats in the New Jersey State Senate 11 seats needed for a majority
	Majority party	Minority party
Party	Republican	Democratic
Seats before	14	7
Seats after	13	8
Seat change	▼1	▲1
Popular vote	26,743	32,098
Percentage	45.45%	54.55%
Seats up	4	3
Races won	3	4
- Results by district Democratic hold Democratic gain Republican hold Republican gain No election
Senate President before election
John W. Taylor
Republican
Elected Senate President
John W. Taylor
Republican

The 1874 New Jersey Senate election was held on November 3, 1874, to elect seven of the 21 members of the New Jersey Senate that were up for election. Under the 1844 New Jersey Constitution, each county was apportioned one Senate seat.

The elections were held concurrently with the gubernatorial election and assembly elections as well. Democrats picked up the Atlantic and Mercer seats, while Republicans gained the Morris County seat.

== Summary of results by county ==
County	Incumbent	Party	Elected Senator	Party
Atlantic	William Moore	Rep	Hosea F. Madden	Dem
Bergen	Cornelius Lydecker	Dem	George Dayton	Dem
Burlington	Barton F. Thorn	Rep	No election	
Camden	W. J. Sewell	Rep	No election	
Cape May	Richard S. Leaming	Rep	No election	
Cumberland	Caleb H. Sheppard	Rep	J. Howard Willets	Rep
Essex	John W. Taylor	Rep	No election	
Gloucester	Samuel Hopkins	Rep	No election	
Hudson	John R. McPherson	Dem	Leon Abbett	Dem
Hunterdon	Frederic A. Potts	Rep	No election	
Mercer	Charles Hewitt	Rep	Jonathan H. Blackwell	Dem
Middlesex	Levi D. Jarrard	Rep	No election	
Monmouth	William Hendrickson	Dem	No election	
Morris	Augustus W. Cutler	Dem	John Hill	Rep
Ocean	John G. W. Havens	Rep	John S. Schultze	Rep
Passaic	John Hopper	Dem	No election	
Salem	Isaac Newkirk	Rep	No election	
Somerset	Elisha B. Wood	Rep	No election	
Sussex	Samuel T. Smith	Dem	No election	
Union	J. Henry Stone	Rep	No election	
Warren	Joseph B. Cornish	Dem	No election	

=== Closest races ===
Seats where the margin of victory was under 10%:

1. Morris County, 1.14% (gain)
2. Mercer County, 1.84% (gain)
3. Atlantic County, 2.42% (gain)
4. Cumberland County, 3.96%
5. Ocean County, 7.98%

== Detailed results ==
=== Atlantic ===
1874 general election
Party	Candidate	Votes	%
Democratic	Hosea F. Madden	1,290	51.21%
Republican	William Moore (incumbent)	1,229	48.79%
Total votes		2,519	100.00%
Democratic gain from Republican			

=== Bergen ===
1874 general election
Party	Candidate	Votes	%
Democratic	George Dayton	3,383	56.38%
Republican	Jardine	2,617	43.62%
Total votes		6,000	100.00%
Democratic hold			

=== Cumberland ===
1874 general election
Party	Candidate	Votes	%
Republican	J. Howard Willets	3,341	51.98%
Democratic	Langley	3,087	48.02%
Total votes		6,428	100.00%
Republican hold			

=== Hudson ===
1874 general election
Party	Candidate	Votes	%
Democratic	Leon Abbett	13,131	61.58%
Republican	Startup	8,191	38.42%
Total votes		21,322	100.00%
Democratic hold			

=== Mercer ===
1874 general election
Party	Candidate	Votes	%
Democratic	Jonathan H. Blackwell	5,357	50.87%
Republican	Barton	5,174	49.13%
Total votes		10,531	100.00%
Democratic gain from Republican			

=== Morris ===
1874 general election
Party	Candidate	Votes	%
Republican	John Hill	4,586	50.57%
Democratic	Canfield	4,482	49.43%
Total votes		9,068	100.00%
Republican gain from Democratic			

=== Ocean ===
1874 general election
Party	Candidate	Votes	%
Republican	John S. Schultze	1,605	53.99%
Democratic	Lonan	1,368	46.01%
Total votes		2,973	100.00%
Republican hold			
