= List of New Jersey state legislatures =

The legislature of the U.S. state of New Jersey has convened many times since statehood became effective on December 18, 1787.

== Legislatures ==
Number	Name	Start date	End date	Last election
New Jersey Constitution of 1776
1	1st New Jersey Legislature	August 27, 1776		
2		1777		
3		1778		
4		1779		
5		1780		
6		1781		
7		1782		
8		1783		
9		1784		
10		1785		
11		1786		
12		1787		
13		1788		
14		1789		
15		1790		
16		1791		
17		1792		
18		1793		
19		1794		
20		1795		
21		1796		
22		1797		
23		1798		
24		1799		
25		?		
26		?		
27		?		
28		?		
29		?		
30		?		
31		?		
32		?		
33		1808		
34		?		
35		?		
36		?		
37		?		
38		?		
39		?		
40		?		
41		?		
42		?		
43		?		
44		?		
45		1820		
46		?		
47		?		
48		?		
49		?		
50		?		
51		?		
52		?		
53		?		
54		?		
55		?		
56		?		
57		1832		
58		1833		
59		1834		
60		1835		
61		1836		
62		1837		
63		1838		
64		1839		
65		1840		
66		1841		
67		1842		
68		1843		
New Jersey Constitution of 1844
69		1845		
70		1846		
71		1847		
72		1848		
73		1849		
74		1850		
75		1851		
76		1852		
77		1853		
78		1854		
79		1855		
80		1856		
81		1857		
82		1858		
83		1859		
84		1860		
85		1861		
86		1862		
87		1863		
88		1864		
89		1865		
90		1866		
91		1867		
92		1868		
93		1869		
94		1870		
95		1871		
96		1872		1871: General Assembly
97		1873		
98		1874		1873: Senate
99		1875		1874: Senate
100		1876		1875: Senate
101		1877		1876: Senate
102		1878		1877: Senate
103		1879		
104		1880		
105		1881		
106		1882		
107	107th New Jersey Legislature	1883		
108		1884		
109		1885		
110		1886		
111		1887		
112		1888		
113		1889		
114		1890		
115		1891		
116		1892		
117		1893		
118		1894		
119		1895		
120		1896		
121		1897		
122		1898		
123		1899		
124		1900		
125		1901		
126		1902		
127		1903		
128		1904		
129		1905		
130		1906		
131		1907		
132		1908		
133		1909		
134		1910		
135		1911		
136		1912		
137		1913		
138		1914		
139		1915		
140		1916		
141		1917		
142		1918		
143		1919		
144		1920		
145		1921		
146		1922		
147		1923		
148		1924		
149		1925		
150		1926		
151		1927		
152		1928		
153		1929		
154		1930		
155		1931		
156		1932		
157		1933		
158		1934		
159		1935		
160		1936		
161		1937		
162		1938		
163		1939		
164		1940		
165		1941		
166		1942		
167		1943		
168		1944		
169		1945		
170		1946		
171		1947		
New Jersey Constitution of 1947
172		1948		
173		1949		
174		1950		
175		1951		
176		1952		November 1951: Senate
177		1953		
178		1954		
179		1955		
180		1956		November 1955: Senate
181		1957		
182		1958		November 1957: Senate
183		1959		
184		1960		November 1959: Senate
185		1961		
186		1962		November 1961: Senate
187	187th New Jersey Legislature	1963		
188	188th New Jersey Legislature	1964		November 1963: Senate
189	189th New Jersey Legislature	1965		
190	190th New Jersey Legislature	1966		November 1965: Senate
191	191st New Jersey Legislature	1967		
192	192nd New Jersey Legislature	1968		November 1967: Senate
193	193rd New Jersey Legislature	1969		
194	194th New Jersey Legislature	January 13, 1970	January 11, 1972	
195	195th New Jersey Legislature	January 11, 1972	January 8, 1974	November 1971: Senate
196	196th New Jersey Legislature	January 8, 1974	January 13, 1976	November 1973: Senate
197	197th New Jersey Legislature	January 13, 1976	January 10, 1978	
198	198th New Jersey Legislature	January 10, 1978	January 8, 1980	November 1977: Senate
199	199th New Jersey Legislature	January 8, 1980	January 12, 1982	
200	200th New Jersey Legislature	January 12, 1982	January 10, 1984	November 1981: Senate
201	201st New Jersey Legislature	January 10, 1984	January 14, 1986	November 1983: Senate
202	202nd New Jersey Legislature	January 14, 1986	January 12, 1988	November 1985: General Assembly
203	203rd New Jersey Legislature	January 12, 1988	January 9, 1990	November 1987: General Assembly, Senate
204	204th New Jersey Legislature	January 9, 1990	January 14, 1992	November 1989: General Assembly
205	205th New Jersey Legislature	January 14, 1992	January 11, 1994	November 1991: General Assembly, Senate
206	206th New Jersey Legislature	January 11, 1994	January 9, 1996	1993: General Assembly, Senate
207	207th New Jersey Legislature	January 9, 1996	January 13, 1998	1995: General Assembly
208	208th New Jersey Legislature	January 13, 1998	January 11, 2000	1997: General Assembly, Senate
209	209th New Jersey Legislature	January 11, 2000	January 8, 2002	1999: General Assembly
210	210th New Jersey Legislature	January 8, 2002	January 13, 2004	2001: General Assembly, Senate
211	211th New Jersey Legislature	January 13, 2004	January 10, 2006	2003: General Assembly, Senate
212	212th New Jersey Legislature	January 10, 2006	January 10, 2008	2005: General Assembly
213	213th New Jersey Legislature	January 10, 2008	January 12, 2010	2007: General Assembly, Senate
214	214th New Jersey Legislature	January 12, 2010	January 10, 2012	November 2009: General Assembly
215	215th New Jersey Legislature	January 10, 2012	January 14, 2014	November 2011: General Assembly, Senate
216	216th New Jersey Legislature	January 14, 2014	January 12, 2016	November 2013: General Assembly, Senate
217	217th New Jersey Legislature	January 12, 2016	January 9, 2018	November 2015: General Assembly
218	218th New Jersey Legislature	January 9, 2018	January 14, 2020	November 2017: General Assembly, Senate
219	219th New Jersey Legislature	January 14, 2020	January 11, 2022	November 2019: General Assembly
220	220th New Jersey Legislature	January 11, 2022	January 9, 2024	November 2021: General Assembly, Senate
221	221st New Jersey Legislature	January 9, 2024	January 13, 2026	November 2023: General Assembly, Senate
222	222nd New Jersey Legislature	January 13, 2026	January 11, 2028	November 2025: General Assembly

== See also ==
- List of speakers of the New Jersey General Assembly
- List of presidents of the New Jersey Senate
- List of governors of New Jersey
- New Jersey State House
- Historical outline of New Jersey
- Lists of United States state legislative sessions
