= 1877 New Jersey Senate election =

- November 6, 1877

7 of the 21 seats in the New Jersey State Senate 11 seats needed for a majority
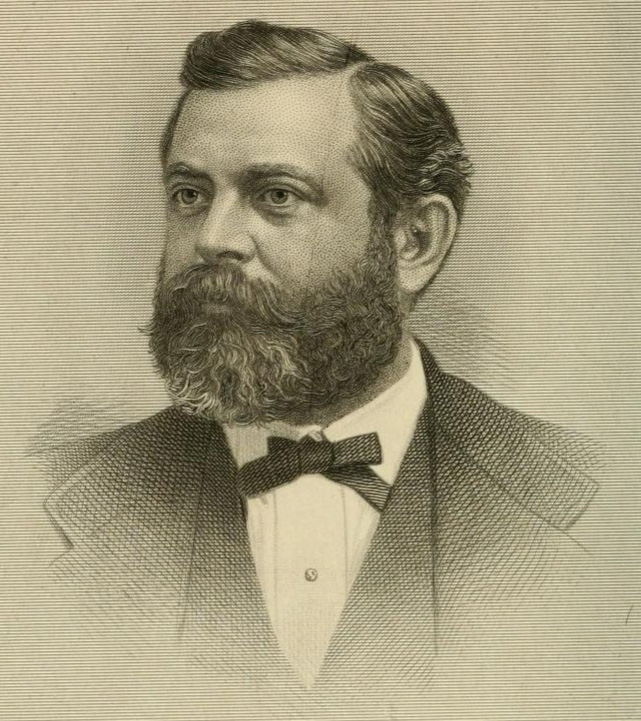

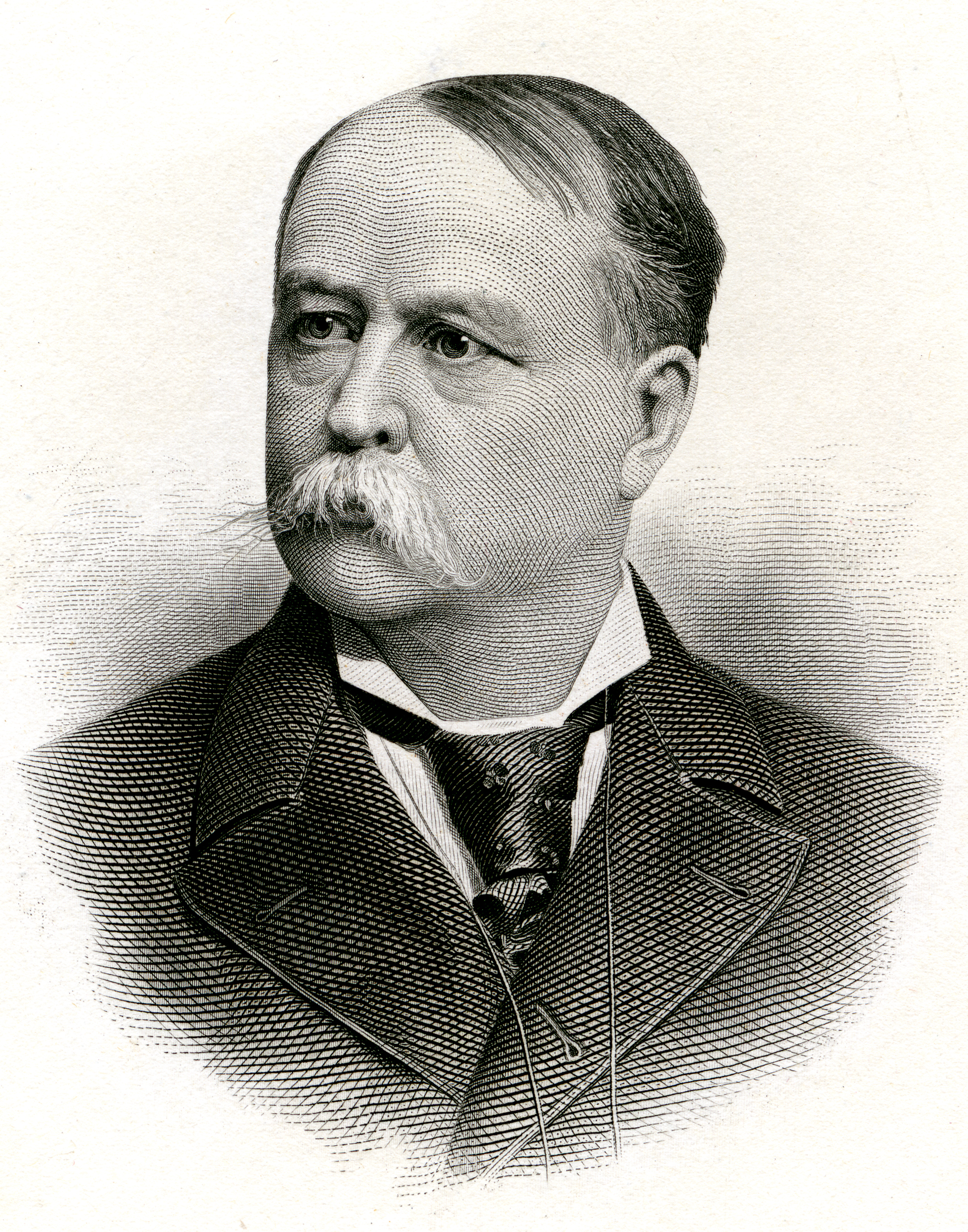
	Majority party	Minority party
Leader	Leon Abbett (retired)	William J. Sewell
Party	Democratic	Republican
Leader's seat	Hudson County	Camden County
Seats before	11	10
Seats after	12	9
Seat change	▲1	▼1
Popular vote	33,633	27,238
Percentage	53.53%	43.35%
Seats up	4	3
Races won	5	2
- Results by district Democratic hold Democratic gain Republican hold Republican gain No election
Senate President before election
Leon Abbett
Democratic
Elected Senate President
George C. Ludlow
Democratic

The 1877 New Jersey Senate election was held on November 6, 1877, to elect seven of the 21 members of the New Jersey Senate that were up for election. Under the 1844 New Jersey Constitution, each county was apportioned one Senate seat.

Democrats picked up the Morris and Ocean county seats, while Republican John J. Gardner picked up the Atlantic County seat.

== Summary of results by county ==
County	Incumbent	Party	Elected Senator	Party
Atlantic	Hosea F. Madden	Dem	John J. Gardner	Rep
Bergen	George Dayton	Dem	Cornelius S. Cooper	Dem
Burlington	Caleb G. Ridgway	Dem	No election	
Camden	W. J. Sewell	Rep	No election	
Cape May	Jonathan F. Leaming	Rep	No election	
Cumberland	J. Howard Willets	Rep	George S. Whitcar	Rep
Essex	William H. Kirk	Rep	No election	
Gloucester	Thomas B. Mathers	Rep	No election	
Hudson	Leon Abbett	Dem	Rudolph F. Rabe	Dem
Hunterdon	James N. Pidcock	Dem	No election	
Mercer	Jonathan H. Blackwell	Dem	Cromwell Marsh	Dem
Middlesex	George C. Ludlow	Dem	No election	
Monmouth	William Hendrickson	Dem	No election	
Morris	John Hill	Rep	Augustus C. Canfield	Dem
Ocean	John S. Schultze	Rep	Ephraim P. Emson	Dem
Passaic	Garret Hobart	Rep	No election	
Salem	Chas. S. Plummer	Rep	No election	
Somerset	Charles B. Moore	Dem	No election	
Sussex	Frank M. Ward	Dem	No election	
Union	William J. Magie	Rep	No election	
Warren	William Silverthorn	Dem	No election	

=== Closest races ===
Seats where the margin of victory was under 10%:

1. Mercer County, 1.04%
2. Bergen County, 3.16%
3. Cumberland County, 4.21%
4. Atlantic County, 4.68% (gain)
5. Morris County, 4.88% (gain)

=== Other gains ===
Seats that flipped party control where the margin of victory was over 10%:

1. Ocean County, 16.52% (gain)

== Detailed results ==
=== Atlantic ===
1877 general election
Party	Candidate	Votes	%
Republican	John J. Gardner	1,599	52.34%
Democratic	A. Doughty	1,456	47.66%
Total votes		3,055	100.00%
Republican gain from Democratic			

=== Bergen ===
1877 general election
Party	Candidate	Votes	%
Democratic	Cornelius S. Cooper	3,030	51.58%
Republican	Fr. Howland	2,844	48.42%
Total votes		5,874	100.00%
Democratic hold			

=== Cumberland ===
1877 general election
Party	Candidate	Votes	%
Republican	George S. Whitcar	2,667	38.83%
Democratic	Nat'l Stratton	2,378	34.62%
Greenback	Charles C. Grosscup	1,824	26.55%
Total votes		6,869	100.00%
Republican hold			

=== Hudson ===
1877 general election
Party	Candidate	Votes	%
Democratic	Rudolph F. Rabe	14,563	61.82%
Republican	Jacob Weart	8,995	38.18%
Total votes		23,558	100.00%
Democratic hold			

=== Mercer ===
1877 general election
Party	Candidate	Votes	%
Democratic	Cromwell Marsh	5,878	49.94%
Republican	J. H. Brueret	5,756	48.90%
Prohibition	H. B. Howell	137	1.16%
Total votes		11,771	100.00%
Democratic hold			

=== Morris ===
1877 general election
Party	Candidate	Votes	%
Democratic	Augustus C. Canfield	4,428	52.44%
Republican	William Hillard	4,016	47.56%
Total votes		8,444	100.00%
Democratic gain from Republican			

=== Ocean ===
1877 general election
Party	Candidate	Votes	%
Democratic	Ephraim P. Emson	1,900	58.26%
Republican	H. G. Gullick	1,361	41.74%
Total votes		3,261	100.00%
Democratic gain from Republican			
