= 1875 New Jersey Senate election =

- November 2, 1875

8 of the 21 seats in the New Jersey State Senate 11 seats needed for a majority
	Majority party	Minority party
Party	Republican	Democratic
Seats before	13	8
Seats after	12	9
Seat change	▼1	▲1
Popular vote	37,203	35,052
Percentage	51.49%	48.51%
Seats up	6	2
Races won	5	3
- Results by district Democratic hold Democratic gain Republican hold No election
Senate President before election
John W. Taylor
Republican
Elected Senate President
William J. Sewell
Republican

The 1875 New Jersey Senate election was held on November 2, 1875, to elect eight of the 21 members of the New Jersey Senate that were up for election. Under the 1844 New Jersey Constitution, each county was apportioned one Senate seat.

Democrats picked up the Somerset County seat, while the rest of the seats were successfully defended by both parties.

== Summary of results by county ==
County	Incumbent	Party	Elected Senator	Party
Atlantic	Hosea F. Madden	Dem	No election	
Bergen	George Dayton	Dem	No election	
Burlington	Barton F. Thorn	Rep	No election	
Camden	W. J. Sewell	Rep	W. J. Sewell	Rep
Cape May	Richard S. Leaming	Rep	No election	
Cumberland	J. Howard Willets	Rep	No election	
Essex	John W. Taylor	Rep	WM. H. Kirk	Rep
Gloucester	Samuel Hopkins	Rep	Thos. B. Mathers	Rep
Hudson	Leon Abbett	Dem	No election	
Hunterdon	Frederic A. Potts	Rep	No election	
Mercer	Jonathan H. Blackwell	Dem	No election	
Middlesex	Levi D. Jarrard	Rep	No election	
Monmouth	William Hendrickson	Dem	William Hendrickson	Dem
Morris	John Hill	Rep	No election	
Ocean	John S. Schultze	Rep	No election	
Passaic	John Hopper	Dem	No election	
Salem	Isaac Newkirk	Rep	Chas. S. Plummer	Rep
Somerset	Elisha B. Wood	Rep	Charles B. Moore	Dem
Sussex	Samuel T. Smith	Dem	No election	
Union	J. Henry Stone	Rep	William J. Magie	Rep
Warren	Joseph B. Cornish	Dem	William Silverthorn	Dem

=== Closest races ===
Seats where the margin of victory was under 10%:

1. Somerset County, 2.86% (gain)
2. Salem County, 3.94%
3. Camden County, 6.54%
4. Gloucester County, 7.00%

== Detailed results ==
=== Camden ===
1875 general election
Party	Candidate	Votes	%
Republican	William J. Sewell (incumbent)	4,991	53.32%
Democratic	Lippincott	4,370	46.68%
Total votes		9,361	100.00%
Republican hold			

=== Essex ===
1875 general election
Party	Candidate	Votes	%
Republican	WM. H. Kirk	14,496	57.97%
Democratic	Ferry	10,512	42.03%
Total votes		25,008	100.00%
Republican hold			

=== Gloucester ===
1875 general election
Party	Candidate	Votes	%
Republican	Thos. B. Mathers	2,387	53.50%
Democratic	Carter	2,075	46.50%
Total votes		4,462	100.00%
Republican hold			

=== Monmouth ===
1875 general election
Party	Candidate	Votes	%
Democratic	William Hendrickson (incumbent)	5,123	62.48%
Republican	Herbert	3,077	37.52%
Total votes		8,200	100.00%
Democratic hold			

=== Salem ===
1875 general election
Party	Candidate	Votes	%
Republican	Chas. S. Plummer	2,778	51.97%
Democratic	Wood	2,567	48.03%
Total votes		5,345	100.00%
Republican hold			

=== Somerset ===
1875 general election
Party	Candidate	Votes	%
Democratic	Charles B. Moore	2,691	51.43%
Republican	Schenck	2,541	48.57%
Total votes		5,232	100.00%
Democratic gain from Republican			

=== Union ===
1875 general election
Party	Candidate	Votes	%
Republican	William J. Magie	5,022	56.00%
Democratic	Blancke	3,946	44.00%
Total votes		8,968	100.00%
Republican hold			

=== Warren ===
1875 general election
Party	Candidate	Votes	%
Democratic	William Silverthorn	3,768	66.35%
Republican	Harris	1,911	33.65%
Total votes		5,679	100.00%
Democratic hold			
