= Senator Leaming =

Senator Leaming may refer to:

- Jonathan F. Leaming (1822–1907), New Jersey State Senate
- Richard S. Leaming (1828–1895), New Jersey State Senate
- Walter S. Leaming (1854–1903), New Jersey State Senate
