= 1883 New Jersey gubernatorial election =

- November 6, 1883
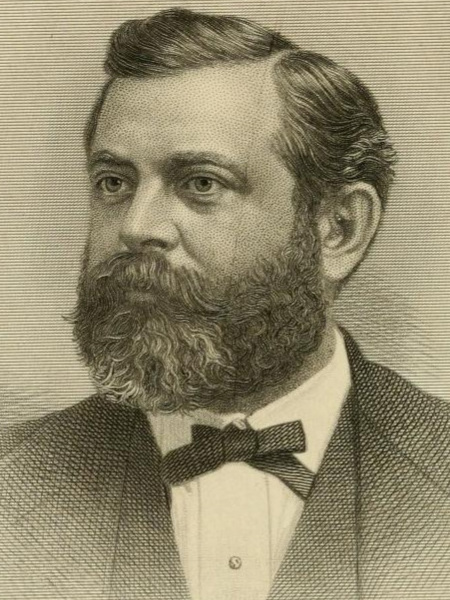

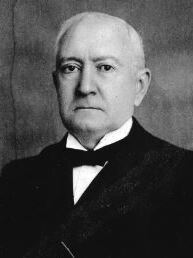
Nominee	Leon Abbett	Jonathan Dixon
Party	Democratic	Republican
Popular vote	103,856	97,047
Percentage	49.93%	46.65%
- County results Abbett: 40–50% 50–60% Dixon: 40–50% 50–60%
Governor before election
George C. Ludlow
Democratic
Elected Governor
Leon Abbett
Democratic

The 1883 New Jersey gubernatorial election was held on November 6, 1883. Democratic nominee Leon Abbett defeated Republican nominee Jonathan Dixon with 49.93% of the vote.

== General election ==
=== Candidates ===
- Leon Abbett, corporation counsel for Jersey City and former State Senator for Hudson County (Democratic)
- Jonathan Dixon, Jersey City judge (Republican)
- Solomon Parsons, (Prohibition)
- Benjamin Urner, (Greenback)

=== Results ===
New Jersey gubernatorial election, 1883
Party	Candidate	Votes	%	±%
Democratic	Leon Abbett	103,856	49.93%	▲0.40
Republican	Jonathan Dixon	97,047	46.65%	▼2.62
Prohibition	Solomon Parsons	4,153	2.00%	▲1.92
Greenback	Benjamin Urner	2,960	1.42%	▲0.30
Majority				
Total votes		208,016	100.00%	
Democratic hold		Swing		
