= Jonathan Dixon (judge) =

American judge

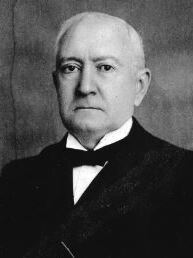
- Dixon c. 1900

Associate Justice of the Supreme Court of New Jersey
- In office 1875 – May 21, 1906
- Appointed by: Joseph D. Bedle; George C. Ludlow; Robert Stockton Green; John W. Griggs; Franklin Murphy

Personal details
- Born: July 6, 1839 Liverpool, England
- Died: May 21, 1906 (aged 66) Englewood, New Jersey
- Party: Republican

Jonathan Dixon (July 6, 1839 – May 21, 1906) was an English-born American attorney and jurist from Jersey City, New Jersey. He was an associate justice of the Supreme Court of New Jersey from 1875 until his death and was the Republican nominee for governor of New Jersey in 1883, although he declined to actively campaign and refrained from involvement in politics throughout his career on the bench.

== Biography ==
Dixon was born in Liverpool, England on July 6, 1839. His father, also named Jonathan Dixon, came to the United States in 1848 and was followed in 1850 by his family, settling in New Brunswick, New Jersey. He graduated from Rutgers College in 1859 and was admitted to the New Jersey bar in 1862. He moved to Jersey City to practice law in 1865.

Dixon was associated with New Jersey Supreme Court Justice Gilbert Collins until 1875, when he was appointed to be a Supreme Court Justice by Governor Joseph D. Bedle. He was subsequently reappointed by Governors Ludlow, Green, Griggs, and Murphy. In February 1880 the socialist leader Joseph Patrick McDonnell, editor of the Labor Standard, was tried for libel after publishing a letter from a brick maker who said of the Clark & Van Blarcom brickyard that the men were overworked and starved, and housed in places no better than pigsties. Dixon presided over the much-publicized trial, earning a reputation for being anti-labor. McDonnell was convicted and sentenced to two months in jail. When he was released on 1 April 1880 he was met by a cheering crowd.

Dixon declined to take an active part in politics, and even when New Jersey Republicans nominated him for governor in 1883, he refused to make political speeches, since he felt it would be beneath the dignity of a Supreme Court Justice. McDonnell used the Labor Standard to attack Dixon as anti-labor and anti-union, and threw his support behind Leon Abbett, giving a useful boost to the Democratic candidate. Abbett, also from Jersey City, attacked Dixon for drafting the "thieves' charter" that deprived the Jersey City Irish of power in 1871. Abbett also criticized Dixon for handing down Supreme Court rulings that were perceived as anti-labor. Abbett defeated Dixon by a margin of 103,856 to 97,047.

Dixon continued to serve as Supreme Court Justice until his death. He died in 1906 at his daughter's home in Englewood, New Jersey at the age of 66.

Party political offices
Preceded by Frederic A. Potts	Republican Nominee for Governor of New Jersey; 1883	Succeeded by Benjamin Franklin Howey
