= 1871 New Jersey General Assembly election =

1871 New Jersey General Assembly elections
- November 1871

All 60 seats in the New Jersey General Assembly 31 seats needed for a majority
	Majority party	Minority party
Leader	XFL
Party	Republican	Democratic
Seats before	?	?
Seats after	36	24
Seat change	▲ ?	▼ ?
Popular vote	75,513	76,392
Percentage	49.71%	50.29%
- Results of the 1871 New Jersey General Assembly election by district; shading shows the winner’s share of the vote, red for Republicans and blue for Democrats.
Elected Speaker
TBD

The 1871 New Jersey General Assembly elections were held in November. Under the 1844 New Jersey Constitution, each county was apportioned a number of Assembly seats based on their population in the 1870 U.S. Census.

The elections took place during the second year of Governor Joel Parker's second non-consecutive term in office.

== Incumbents not running for re-election ==
=== Close races ===
Seats where the margin of victory was under 1%:

1. Essex 3rd, 0.11%
2. Burlington 1st, 0.26%
3. Salem 1st, 0.30%
4. Bergen 2nd, 0.90%
5. Mercer 3rd, 0.95%

Seats where the margin of victory was 1% or more but under 5%:

1. Bergen 1st, 1.00%
2. Mercer 2nd, 1.25%
3. Essex 9th, 1.46%
4. Middlesex 3rd, 1.63%
5. Hudson 5th, 2.40%
6. Middlesex 2nd, 2.53%
7. Hudson 2nd, 2.67%
8. Morris 3rd, 2.99%
9. Hudson 6th, 3.49%
10. Middlesex 1st, 3.50%
11. Salem 2nd, 3.79%

Seats where the margin of victory was 5% or more but under 10%:

1. Essex 6th, 5.07%
2. Hudson 7th, 5.41%
3. Union 3rd, 5.55%
4. Burlington 4th, 6.51%
5. Hudson 3rd, 6.64%
6. Essex 5th, 6.91%
7. Morris 1st, 6.99%
8. Burlington 2nd, 7.21%
9. Camden 1st, 7.22%
10. Passaic 1st, 8.09%
11. Camden 3rd, 8.14%
12. Union 2nd, 8.62%
13. Gloucester 1st, 9.38%
14. Warren 1st, 9.52%

== See also ==
- List of New Jersey state legislatures
