= Walter S. Leaming =

American politician

Postmaster of Cape May
- In office January 16, 1901 – March 29, 1903
- Preceded by: Furman L. Richardson
- Succeeded by: William F. Williams

Member of the New Jersey Senate from Cape May County
- In office 1889–1891
- Preceded by: Joseph H. Hanes
- Succeeded by: Lemuel E. Miller

Member of the New Jersey General Assembly from Cape May County
- In office 1888
- Preceded by: Alvin P. Hildreth
- Succeeded by: Eugene C. Cole

Personal details
- Born: March 4, 1854 Seaville, New Jersey, U.S.
- Died: March 29, 1903 (aged 49)
- Party: Republican
- Parent(s): Jonathan F. Leaming (father); Eliza Bennett (mother)
- Education: Pennsylvania College of Dental Surgery; Jefferson Medical College (M.D.)

Walter S. Leaming (March 4, 1854 – March 29, 1903) was an American physician and politician.

Leaming was the son of Jonathan F. Leaming and Eliza Bennett and was of English ancestry. He was born on March 4, 1854, in Seaville, New Jersey, and grew up there. Leaming served as a law clerk in New York City and attended the Mayville Academy. In 1878, he graduated from the Pennsylvania College of Dental Surgery. He earned his M.D. from Jefferson Medical College in 1882 and subsequently became a partner of his father. Leaming enjoyed success as a dentist and used all of the newest tools in his office. He married his first wife, Mary H. Holmes.

In 1887 Leaming was elected to the New Jersey Assembly as a Republican. He gave a speech to the assembly in 1888 that helped Colonel Henry W. Sawyer become the Sinking Funk Commissioner. He was elected to the New Jersey Senate in 1888 and served until 1891. He was nominated for president of the Senate in 1891. On December 22, 1889, he married his second wife Rebecca Bennett; he had three children between his two marriages: Nellie, Rebecca, and Henrietta. Leaming moved to Cape May, New Jersey, in 1891 and practiced dentistry. He was elected to the Cape May City Council in 1895 and was its president, serving a three-year term. His brother-in-law was city solicitor J. Spicer Leaming. In 1899, he became the city treasurer, and he also served as director of the Mechanics and Laborer's Building and Loan Association. Leaming later served as postmaster of Cape May. He died unexpectedly on March 29, 1903. Senator William J. Sewell praised his sense and character, stating "I have the warmest and deepest sentiments and friendship and affection for Senator Walter S. Leaming."
