= 1963 New Jersey Senate election =

1963 New Jersey Senate elections
- November 5, 1963

11 of the 21 seats in the New Jersey State Senate 11 seats needed for a majority
- Turnout: 70% (▼3pp)
	Majority party	Minority party
Leader	William Ozzard
Party	Republican	Democratic
Leader's seat	Somerset
Seats before	11	10
Seats won	15	6
Seat change	▲4	▼4
Seats up	5	6
Races won	9	2
- Results by district Democratic hold Republican hold Republican gain No election
Senate President before election
William E. Ozzard
Republican
Elected Senate President
Charles Sandman
Republican

The 1963 New Jersey Senate elections were held on November 5. The elections took place midway through the first term of Governor Richard J. Hughes. Eleven of New Jersey's 21 counties elected Senators. Republicans gained four seats by flipping one seat each in Burlington, Camden, Gloucester, and Essex counties.

== Incumbents not running for re-election ==
=== Democratic ===
- Donal C. Fox (Essex) (lost support of county organization)

=== Republican ===
All five Republican incumbents stood for re-election.

== Summary of results by county ==
County	Incumbent	Party	Elected Senator	Party
Atlantic	Frank S. Farley	Rep	No election	
Bergen	Pierce Deamer	Rep	No election	
Burlington	Henry S. Haines	Dem	Edwin B. Forsythe	Rep
Camden	Joseph W. Cowgill	Dem	Frederick J. Scholz	Rep
Cape May	Charles W. Sandman	Rep	Charles W. Sandman	Rep
Cumberland	Robert H. Weber	Dem	No election	
Essex	Donal C. Fox	Dem	C. Robert Sarcone	Rep
Gloucester	Thomas F. Connery Jr.	Dem	John E. Hunt	Rep
Hudson	William F. Kelly Jr.	Dem	No election	
Hunterdon	Raymond E. Bowkley	Rep	No election	
Mercer	Sido Ridolfi	Dem	No election	
Middlesex	John A. Lynch	Dem	John A. Lynch	Dem
Monmouth	Richard R. Stout	Rep	Richard R. Stout	Rep
Morris	Thomas J. Hillery	Rep	No election	
Ocean	W. Steelman Mathis	Rep	No election	
Passaic	Anthony J. Grossi	Dem	No election	
Salem	John A. Waddington	Dem	John A. Waddington	Dem
Somerset	William E. Ozzard	Rep	William E. Ozzard	Rep
Sussex	George B. Harper	Rep	No election	
Union	Nelson Stamler (Note: Stamler was elected to the seat in November 1962 following the death of Senator Robert C. Crane.)	Rep	Nelson Stamler	Rep
Warren	Wayne Dumont	Rep	Wayne Dumont	Rep

=== Close races ===
Seats where the margin of victory was under 10%:

1. Essex, 6.41% gain
2. Gloucester, 8.07% gain
3. Union, 9.22%
4. Burlington, 9.71% gain

== Burlington ==
=== Democratic primary ===
==== Candidates ====
- Henry S. Haines, incumbent Senator
- Edward J. Hulse, director of the Burlington County Board of Chosen Freeholders and brother-in-law of Governor Hughes

==== Campaign ====
The campaign was bitter, with Hulse criticizing Haines's record in the Senate. Haines was aligned with Grover C. Richman Jr., the former Attorney General whom Governor Hughes had outmaneuvered for the 1961 Democratic nomination.

==== Results ====
1963 Burlington Democratic Senate primary
Party	Candidate	Votes	%
Democratic	Edward J. Hulse	8,133	56.78%
Democratic	Henry S. Haines (incumbent)	6,190	43.22%
Total votes		14,323	100.0%

Hulse and his four-man ticket won the primary by carrying the heavily Democratic towns of Burlington, Florence, Levittown, and Maple Shade. Haines was strongest in Bordentown and also received a large majority in Palmyra.

Both Haines and Hulse lost their own home towns, Burlington and Edgewater Park, respectively.

=== General election ===
==== Candidates ====
- Bernardo S. Doganiero, perennial candidate (Socialist Labor)
- Edward J. Hulse, director of the Burlington County Board of Chosen Freeholders (Democratic)
- Edwin B. Forsythe, former mayor of Moorestown (Republican)
- John V. Mahalchik (Independent)

==== Results ====
1963 general election
Party	Candidate	Votes	%	±%
Republican	Edwin B. Forsythe	35,847	54.63%	▲8.76
Democratic	Edward J. Hulse	29,476	44.92%	▼9.21
Independent	John V. Mahalchik	157	0.24%	N/A
Socialist Labor	Bernardo S. Doganiero	135	0.21%	N/A
Total votes		65,615	100.0%	

== Camden ==
=== Democratic primary ===
==== Candidates ====
- Joseph F. Carroll, college professor of education
- Joseph W. Cowgill, incumbent Senator

==== Results ====
1963 Camden Democratic Senate primary (partial results)
Party	Candidate	Votes	%
Democratic	Joseph W. Cowgill (incumbent)	15,181	84.25%
Democratic	Joseph F. Carroll	2,837	15.75%
Total votes		18,018	100.0%

Cowgill won the city of Camden with a 5–1 margin.

=== General election ===
==== Candidates ====
- Joseph W. Cowgill, incumbent Senator (Democratic)
- Julius Levin (Socialist Labor)
- Frederick J. Scholz, senior vice president of First Camden National Bank and Trust Co. (Republican)

==== Results ====
1963 general election
Party	Candidate	Votes	%	±%
Republican	Frederick J. Scholz	72,873	54.93%	▲6.65
Democratic	Joseph W. Cowgill (incumbent)	59,246	44.66%	▼7.06
Socialist Labor	Julius Levin	535	0.40%	N/A
Total votes		132,654	100.0%	

== Cape May ==
1963 general election
Party	Candidate	Votes	%	±%
Republican	Charles W. Sandman (incumbent)	12,900	60.98%	▼0.40
Democratic	Carlton E. Mason	7,025	33.21%	▼5.41
Independent	Walter C. Wright	1,231	5.82%	N/A
Total votes		21,156	100.0%	

== Essex ==
=== General election ===
==== Candidates ====
- Elmer Matthews, Speaker of the New Jersey General Assembly (Democratic)
- George C. Richardson, Democratic Assemblyman at-large for Essex County (New Frontier)
- C. Robert Sarcone, Assemblyman at-large for Essex County (Republican)
- David E. Wilson (Conservative)
- Paul J. Wolek (Legalized Gambling Bonus)
- Murray Zuckoff (Socialist Workers)

==== Results ====
1963 general election
Party	Candidate	Votes	%	±%
Republican	C. Robert Sarcone	125,836	50.72%	▲5.49
Democratic	Elmer Matthews	109,934	44.31%	▼6.80
Independent Democratic	George C. Richardson	10,164	4.10%	N/A
Conservative	David E. Wilson	1,248	0.50%	N/A
Independent	Paul J. Wolek	551	0.22%	N/A
Socialist Workers	Murray Zuckoff	351	0.14%	N/A
Total votes		248,084	100.0%	

== Gloucester ==
1963 general election
Party	Candidate	Votes	%	±%
Republican	John E. Hunt	27,562	54.00%	▲4.77
Democratic	Thomas F. Connery Jr. (incumbent)	23,443	45.93%	▼4.85
Socialist Labor	David E. Wilson	38	0.07%	N/A
Total votes		51,043	100.0%	

== Middlesex ==
1963 general election
Party	Candidate	Votes	%	±%
Democratic	John A. Lynch (incumbent)	94,829	63.29%	▼1.01
Republican	Robert F. Moss	55,013	36.71%	▲1.01
Total votes		149,842	100.0%	

== Monmouth ==
1963 general election
Party	Candidate	Votes	%	±%
Republican	Richard R. Stout (incumbent)	67,449	59.65%	▲1.86
Democratic	Earl Moody	45,622	40.35%	▼1.86
Total votes		113,071	100.0%	

== Salem ==
1963 general election
Party	Candidate	Votes	%	±%
Democratic	John A. Waddington (incumbent)	13,665	61.86%	▲1.94
Republican	Joseph Narrow	8,412	38.08%	▼2.00
Socialist Labor	David E. Wilson	12	0.05%	N/A
Total votes		22,089	100.0%	

== Somerset ==
1963 general election
Party	Candidate	Votes	%	±%
Republican	William E. Ozzard (incumbent)	30,349	58.63%	▲1.60
Democratic	John J. Carlin	21,416	41.37%	▼1.60
Total votes		51,765	100.0%	

== Union ==
1963 general election
Party	Candidate	Votes	%	±%
Republican	Nelson Stamler (incumbent)	94,820	54.61%	
Democratic	James M. McGowan	78,814	45.39%	
Total votes		173,634	100.0%	

== Warren ==
1963 general election
Party	Candidate	Votes	%	±%
Republican	Wayne Dumont (incumbent)	14,062	59.32%	▲2.59
Democratic	Joseph T. Brennan	9,645	40.68%	▼2.59
Total votes		23,707	100.0%	
