= Levi D. Jarrard House =

- U.S. National Register of Historic Places
- New Jersey Register of Historic Places
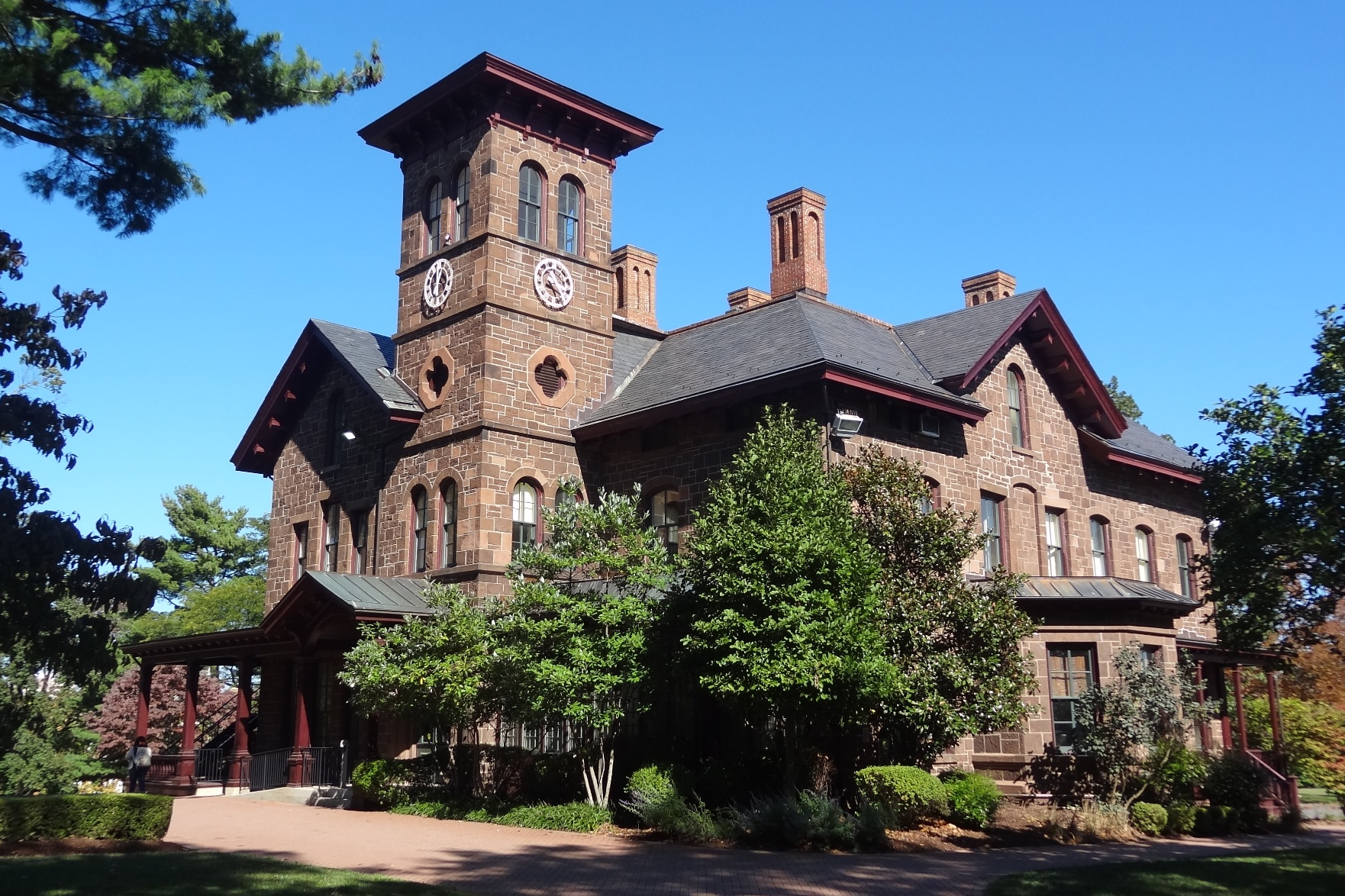
- College Hall

- Location within Middlesex County, New Jersey Location within New Jersey Location within the United States
- Location: George St., Douglass College campus, New Brunswick, New Jersey
- Coordinates: 40°29′11″N 74°26′16″W
- Area: 6 acres (2.4 ha)
- Built: 1868
- Architectural style: Italian Villa
- NRHP reference No.: 82003282
- NJRHP No.: 1865

Significant dates
- Added to NRHP: April 22, 1982
- Designated NJRHP: March 27, 1981

The Levi D. Jarrard House is a historic building located on the Douglass College campus of Rutgers University in New Brunswick, New Jersey. It was constructed in 1868 by an unknown architect, as a private residence for Levi D. Jarrard. Levi D Jarrard, was acting as Postmaster of New Brunswick from 1881-1883, but was previously employed as a New Jersey State Senator as well as the Middlesex County Collector. In 1883 he was found to have embezzled approximately $20,000, and had fled to Canada with the funds, leaving his family to struggle with payments on the house. The house was then purchased by John N. Carpender, who would later lease it to the New Jersey College for Women.

This historical building is a well-preserved example of the large brownstone villas that populated New Brunswick during the late nineteenth century; one of the porches has since been enclosed, but the house remains otherwise unaltered. Brown sandstone has been a common building material in New Brunswick for almost 200 years, beginning with 18th and 19th century houses and late public buildings, shaping the civic appearance of New Brunswick. The house was added to the National Register of Historic Places on April 22, 1982, for its significance in architecture and politics/government.

== Douglass Residential College ==
In the summer of 1918, the Board of Trustees of Rutgers College voted to establish a college for women that would be encompassed by the larger Rutgers University. Since the university’s original chartering in 1766 as Queen’s College, it had been committed to give the young adults of the state of New Jersey access to higher education. At the turn of the 20th century, as more and more young men went off to fight in the war, education for women began to be discussed further and was of greater importance. In fact, Mabel Smith Douglass, the first dean of the Women’s College, “along with the New Jersey federation of Women’s Clubs, led the movement, which began in earnest in 1911, to establish the institution." At this same meeting where the board of trustees voted to establish this college, a special committee was appointed to oversee the planning and management, to basically oversee the fruition of this decision. Locations for the college we are discussed in length as well as how much it would take to establish the college and who would run it. According to the recorded minutes, “The Board of Trustees has decided to take over the estate of Mrs. John N. Carpender, New Brunswick, near the college property” and Mrs. Douglass was to be appointed the Dean of the Women’s College. The estimated cost for the establishment of the college was $75,000. In addition to this, the board also hoped that the college could be established quickly enough to open that coming September. In the address given by university President, William Henry Demarest, in reference to the board’s meetings, he states, “An item of utmost importance is the coming into the market of the John N. Carpender property, near the college farm, 9 acres and a very large stone house [College Hall], which in the judgement of all consulted would be a best possible location and building for a start of the enterprise.” He later goes onto mention how the asking price for said property is $60,000, and himself and the board do not know how to finance their purchase. This leads to various meetings that would result in different campaigns to fund the purchase of the estate and the founding of the college. For each of these campaigns, more money was collected from private donors as well as the state so that the property could be rented out the college for the first few years of operation. However, the location of the college was not secure until a donation of $50,000 from Mr. James Neilson was made for the purchase of the College Hall Property in 1921.

In 1918, it was leased to the New Jersey College for Women, which later became Douglass Residential College, and it is now known as College Hall, housing offices for faculty. The Levi D. Jarrard House held the entirety of the school at the time of its opening in 1918, only three years after the state voted against women's suffrage. 54 girls used the house as their residence, dining facility, and classroom setting until other accommodations were made. This school was New Jersey’s second college for women, and first college available to commonwealth women that provided its students with the same access to education as their male counterparts. This in and of itself makes the Jarrard House unique because every other woman's school at the time was conceptualized and created at the hands of a male-dominated, elitist educational institution, while Douglass College has its roots in the convictions of women. Though the Levi D Jarrard House was left with a negative legacy from the original owner, it did not take long for its true legacy to be uncovered. The building truly represents the hard work done by Mabel Douglass, her peers, and her students, which permanently altered the way women were viewed in the United States.
