= 1880 New Jersey gubernatorial election =

- November 2, 1880
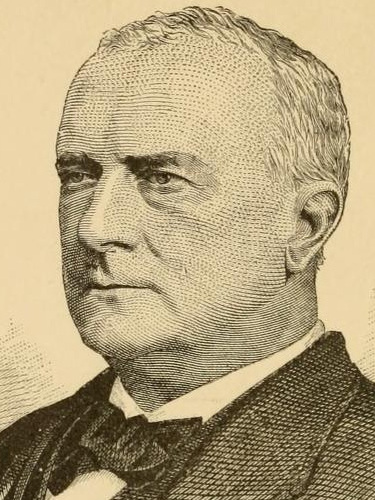

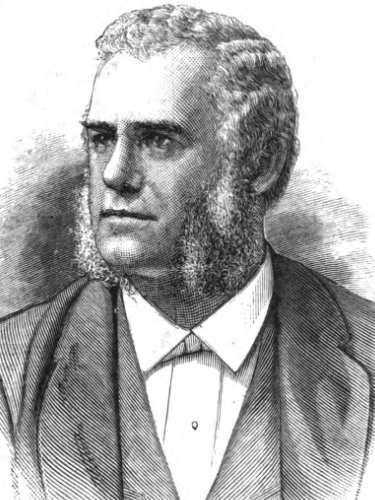
| Nominee | George C. Ludlow | Frederic A. Potts |
| Party | Democratic | Republican |
| Popular vote | 121,666 | 121,015 |
| Percentage | 49.53% | 49.27% |
- County results Ludlow: 50–60% 60–70% Potts: 50–60%
Governor before election
George B. McClellan
Democratic
Elected Governor
George C. Ludlow
Democratic

The 1880 New Jersey gubernatorial election was held on November 2, 1880. Democratic nominee George C. Ludlow defeated Republican nominee Frederic A. Potts with 49.53% of the vote.

== General election ==
=== Candidates ===
- Thomas B. Hoxey, nominee for Governor in 1877 (Greenback)
- George C. Ludlow, State Senator for Middlesex County (Democratic)
- Frederic A. Potts, former State Senator for Hunterdon County and candidate for U.S. Representative in 1872 and 1878 (Republican)
- Stephen B. Ransom (Prohibition)

=== Results ===
New Jersey gubernatorial election, 1880
| Party | Candidate | Votes | % | ±% |
|---|---|---|---|---|
| Democratic | George C. Ludlow | 121,666 | 49.53% | ▼2.12 |
| Republican | Frederic A. Potts | 121,015 | 49.27% | ▲4.35 |
| Greenback | Thomas B. Hoxey | 2,759 | 1.12% | ▼1.56 |
| Prohibition | Stephen B. Ransom | 195 | 0.08% | ▼0.68 |
| Majority | | 245,635 | | |
| Total votes | | | | |
| Democratic hold | | Swing | | |
