= 1889 New Jersey gubernatorial election =

- November 5, 1889
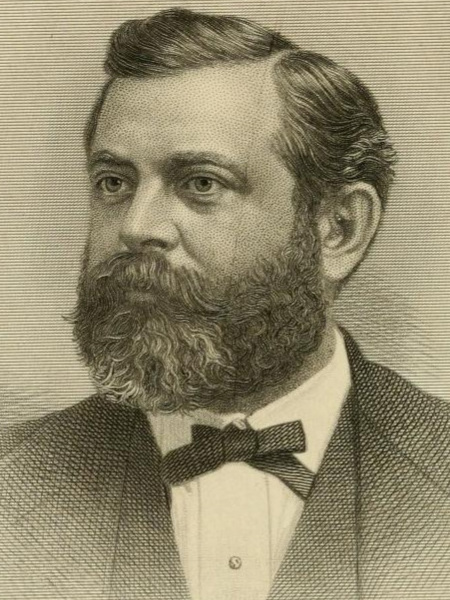

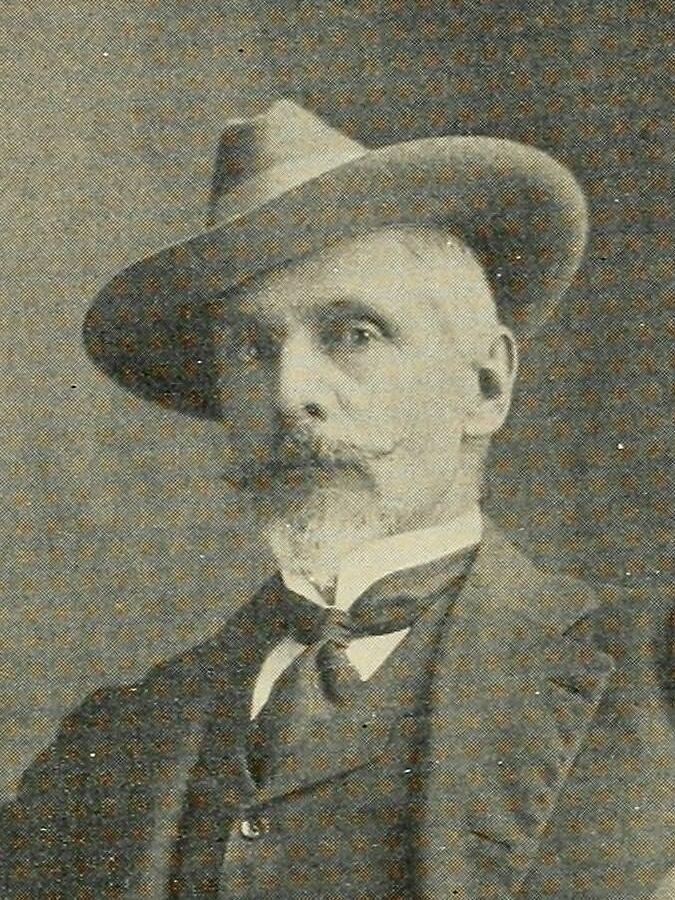
Nominee	Leon Abbett	Edward Burd Grubb Jr.
Party	Democratic	Republican
Popular vote	138,245	123,992
Percentage	51.37%	46.08%
- County results Abbett: 40–50% 50–60% 60–70% Grubb: 40–50% 50–60%
Governor before election
Robert Stockton Green
Democratic
Elected Governor
Leon Abbett
Democratic

The 1889 New Jersey gubernatorial election was held on November 5, 1889. Democratic nominee Leon Abbett defeated Republican nominee Edward Burd Grubb Jr. with 51.37% of the vote.

Abbett, who had previously served as governor from 1884 to 1887, won a second, nonconsecutive term.

== General election ==
=== Candidates ===
- Leon Abbett, former Governor of New Jersey (Democratic)
- Edward Burd Grubb Jr., iron magnate and Civil War veteran (Republican)
- George M. La Monte, paper manufacturer (Prohibition)

=== Results ===
New Jersey gubernatorial election, 1889
Party	Candidate	Votes	%	±%
Democratic	Leon Abbett	138,245	51.37%	▲3.93
Republican	Edward Burd Grubb Jr.	123,992	46.08%	▲2.10
Prohibition	George M. La Monte	6,853	2.55%	▼6.00
Majority				
Total votes		269,090	100.00%	
Democratic hold		Swing		
