= Elmer Matthews =

American lawyer and politician

Elmer M. Matthews (October 18, 1927 – February 5, 2015) was an American lawyer and politician who served three terms in the New Jersey General Assembly.

Born in Orange, New Jersey, Matthews received his bachelor's degree from the University of Notre Dame, his master's degree in taxation from New York University, and his law degree from Fordham University Law School. He then served in the United States Army. Matthews practiced law. Matthews served in the New Jersey General Assembly and was the speaker. He died in Sea Girt, New Jersey.
