= Thomas Beesley Sr. House =

Historic house in New Jersey, United States

- U.S. National Register of Historic Places
- New Jersey Register of Historic Places
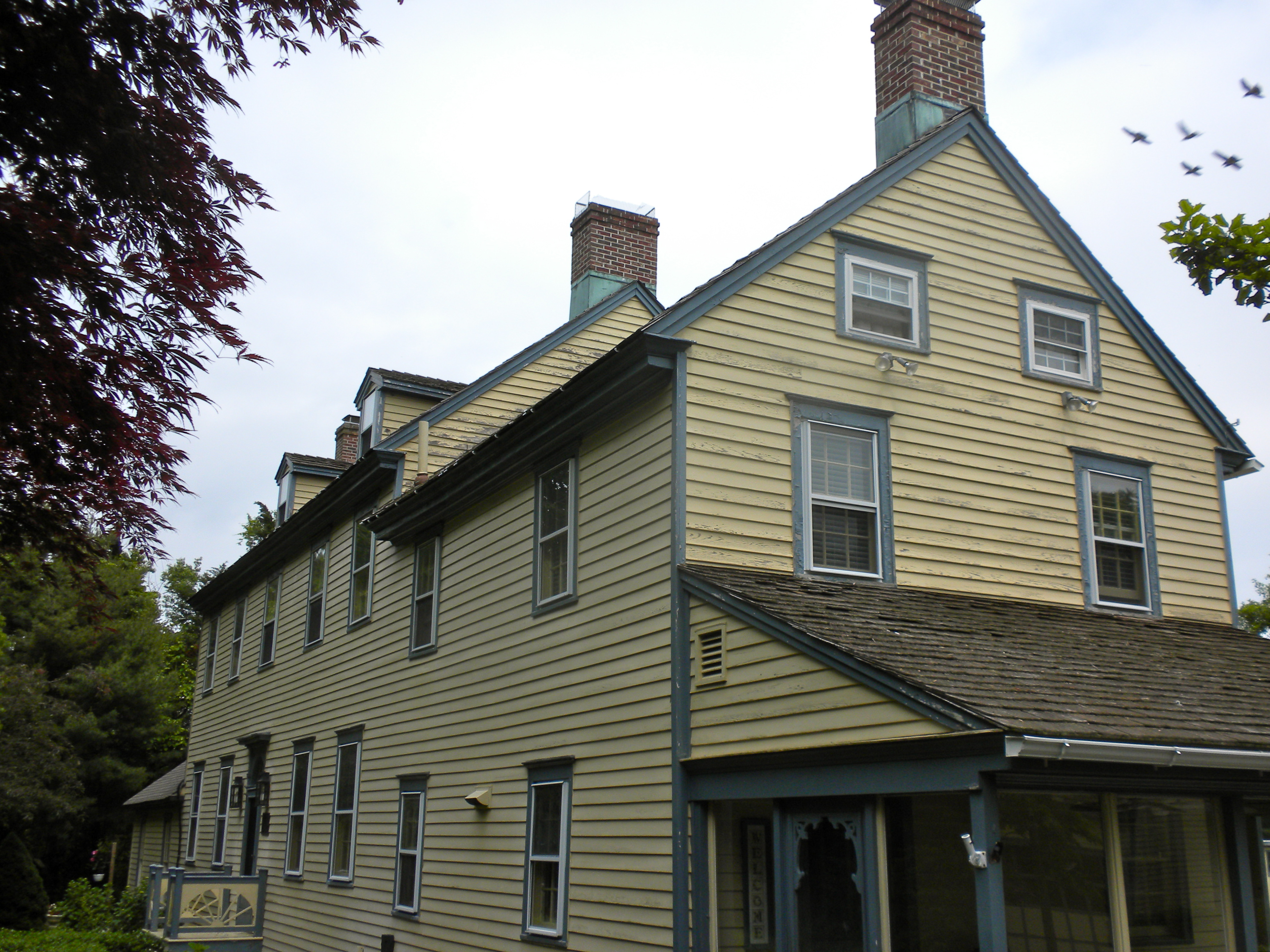
- Thomas Beesley Sr. House in 2010.

- Location within Cape May County, New Jersey Location within New Jersey Location within the United States
- Location: 12 Beesley's Place, Beesley's Point, Upper Township, New Jersey
- Coordinates: 39°16′47″N 74°37′46″W
- Area: 2.7 acres (1.1 ha)
- Built: 1816
- Architectural style: Federal
- NRHP reference No.: 92001682
- NJRHP No.: 1014

Significant dates
- Added to NRHP: December 17, 1992
- Designated NJRHP: November 2, 1992

Thomas Beesley Sr. House is located in the Beesley's Point section of Upper Township, Cape May County, New Jersey, United States. The house was built in 1803 and was added to the National Register of Historic Places on December 17, 1992.

== See also ==
- National Register of Historic Places listings in Cape May County, New Jersey
