= John R. McPherson =

American politician

John Rhoderic McPherson
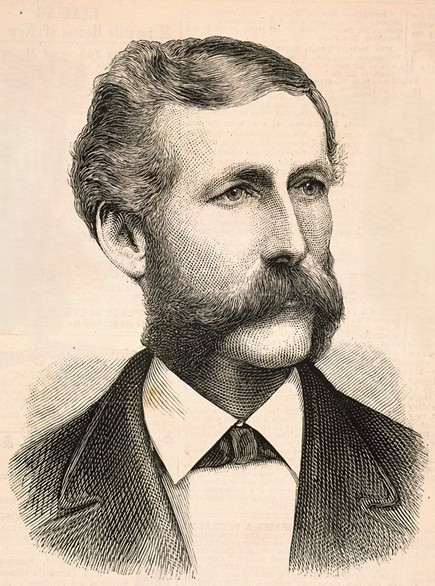
- McPherson in 1877

United States Senator from New Jersey
- In office March 4, 1877 – March 3, 1895
- Preceded by: Frederick T. Frelinghuysen
- Succeeded by: William J. Sewell

Member of the New Jersey Senate from Hudson County
- In office 1872–1875
- Preceded by: Noah D. Taylor
- Succeeded by: Leon Abbett

Personal details
- Born: May 9, 1833 York, New York, U.S.
- Died: October 8, 1897 (aged 64) Jersey City, New Jersey, U.S.
- Resting place: Oak Hill Cemetery; Washington, D.C., U.S.
- Party: Democratic
- Spouse: Edla Jane Gregory (m. 1867)
- Children: 2
- Education: Meatpacking business owner and executive

John Rhoderic McPherson (May 9, 1833 – October 8, 1897) was an American businessman, inventor, and Democratic politician who represented New Jersey in the United States Senate for three terms from 1877 to 1895. Prior to his election, he was engaged in Jersey City politics and represented Hudson County in the New Jersey Senate.

A native of York, New York, McPherson raised livestock and worked as a butcher before moving to Jersey City, New Jersey, in 1858, where he became a prominent businessman in the meatpacking industry. An inventor, he devised or created improvements that enhanced sanitation and efficiency in slaughterhouses, many of which were later employed as industry standards.

Active in politics as a Democrat, McPherson served on the Jersey City Board of Aldermen, as president of the Board of Aldermen, and as a member of the New Jersey State Senate. In 1877, McPherson was elected to the United States Senate. He was reelected twice and served from 1877 to 1895. During his Senate service, McPherson spent several terms as chairman of the Naval Affairs Committee.

After leaving the Senate, McPherson resumed his activities in the meatpacking business. He died in Jersey City on October 8, 1897. He was buried at Oak Hill Cemetery in Washington, D.C.

== Early life ==
McPherson was born in York, New York, on May 9, 1833. He was educated in the public schools of York and attended Geneseo Academy. He farmed, raised livestock, and worked as a butcher before moving to Jersey City, New Jersey, in 1858.

== Career ==
In Jersey City, McPherson became a prominent livestock dealer and slaughterhouse owner. As an inventor, McPherson designed or improved several devices and processes to promote efficient and sanitary slaughterhouse operations, many of which were adopted as meatpacking industry standards. McPherson's other business activities included serving as a director or officer of several banks, and president of Jersey City's People's Gas Light Company.

McPherson was active in politics as a Democrat. He served on the Jersey City Board of Aldermen from 1864 to 1870, and was the board's president for three years. In 1871, he was elected to a term in the New Jersey Senate, and he served from 1872 to 1875. McPherson was a Democratic presidential elector in 1876. Democratic nominee Samuel J. Tilden carried New Jersey, and McPherson cast his ballot for the ticket of Tilden and Thomas A. Hendricks.

== U.S. Senator ==
In 1877, McPherson was elected to the United States Senate. He was reelected in 1883 and 1889, and served from March 4, 1877, to March 3, 1895. He served as chairman of the Committee on Naval Affairs during the 46th Congress (1879–1881), and again during the 53rd Congress (1893–1895).

McPherson was a delegate to the 1884 Democratic National Convention. Initially pledged to Thomas F. Bayard, when it became clear after the second ballot that Grover Cleveland had garnered enough votes to win the nomination, McPherson backed Cleveland, who went on to win the general election. McPherson supported Cleveland in 1888, but Cleveland lost the general election to Republican Benjamin Harrison.

McPherson planned a favorite son presidential candidacy in 1892, but became a Cleveland delegate to the Democratic Convention after Cleveland decided to become a candidate. When Cleveland became president for the second time in 1893, McPherson became an opponent because Cleveland did not consult with him on questions of federal patronage for New Jersey.

== Later life ==
After leaving the Senate, McPherson actively managed his livestock and meatpacking business, the Western Stockyard Company, from an office in New York City. In May 1897, William Van Aken, a former McPherson business and political associate, attempted to shoot McPherson over claims that McPherson had cheated him in a business deal twenty years earlier. Van Aken, who was nearly blind, was acquitted of attempted murder. He was subsequently indicted for carrying a concealed weapon. Van Aken pleaded guilty to the charge and paid a $10 fine.

== Death and burial ==
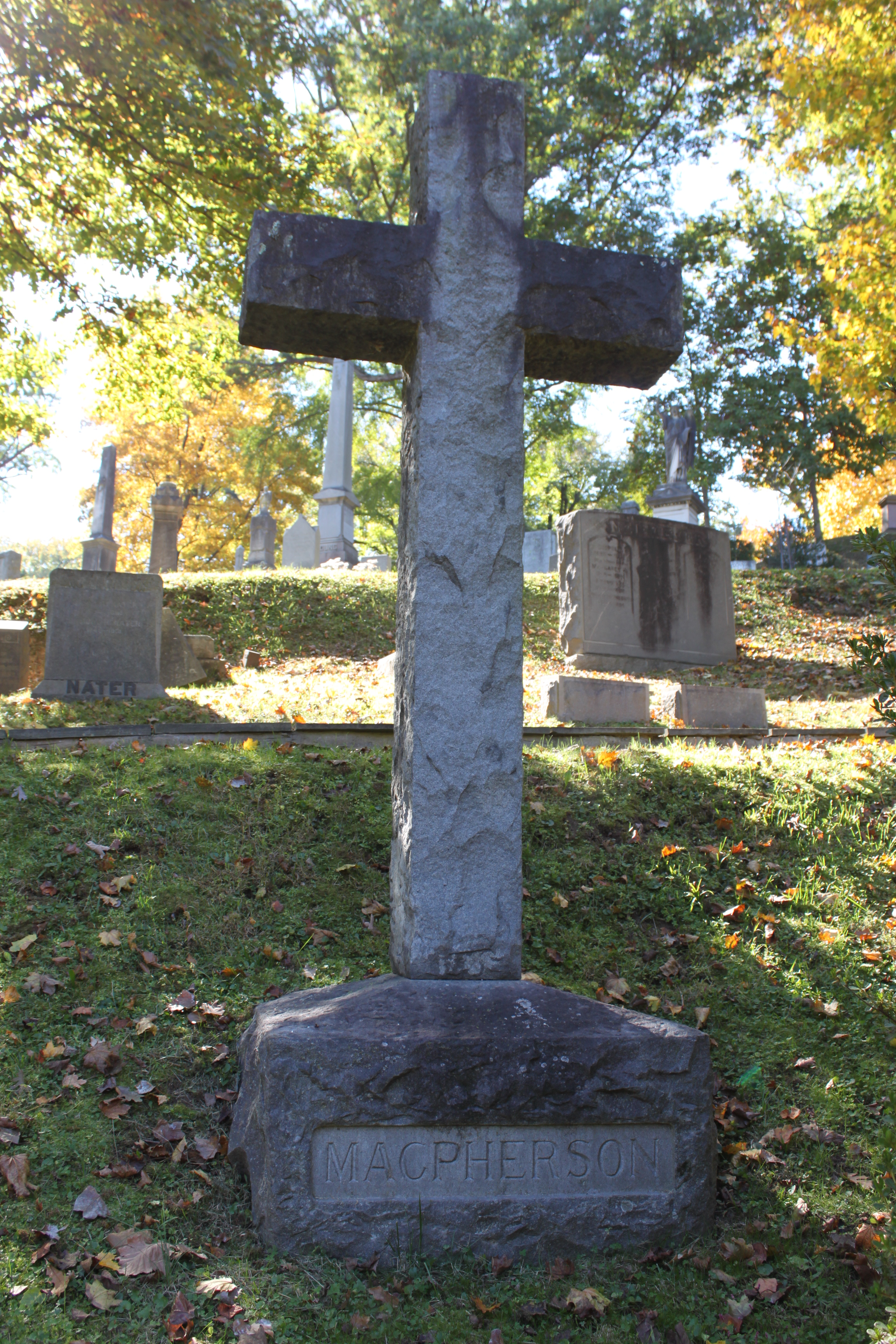
Grave of MacPherson at Oak Hill Cemetery

McPherson died in Jersey City, New Jersey, on October 8, 1897. He was buried in Oak Hill Cemetery in Washington, D.C. McPherson sometimes used "MacPherson", the original Scottish spelling of his name, and his family grave marker is inscribed with the "Mac" prefix. In addition, some sources including his gravestone indicate that his year of birth was 1832, though most sources give it as 1833.

== Family ==
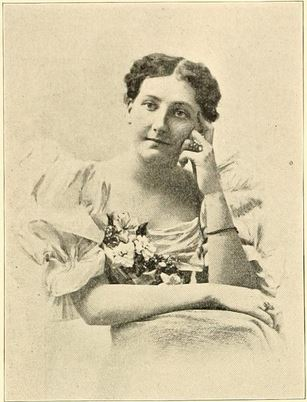
Edla "Ella" McPherson

In 1868, McPherson married Edla Jane Gregory (1845–1901). Their children included Gregory (1868–1896) and Edla (1873–1901), who was known as Ella. In 1898, Ella McPherson married Dr. Joseph Muir.

When McPherson died, his wife inherited his estate, which was estimated at $500,000 (about $15.5 million in 2020). When Edla Gregory McPherson died in early 1901, news accounts revealed that she had disapproved of her daughter's marriage and changed her will to provide Ella McPherson Muir only an annual income from the estate during her life, with the bulk being donated to Yale University, of which Gregory McPherson was an alumnus. Mrs. Muir contested the will, but died in late 1901 while the court case was still in progress.

Dr. Muir continued to contest the will as his wife's heir. The estate was settled in late 1902 with payments to Dr. Muir, Yale University, and members of the extended McPherson family. With his second wife, Joseph Muir was the father of architect Edla Muir, whom he named after his first wife.

== Sources ==
=== Books ===
- Brodsky, Alyn (2000). Grover Cleveland: A Study in Character. New York, NY: St. Martin's Press. p. 356. ISBN 978-0-3122-6883-1 – via Google Books.
- Fitzgerald, Thomas F. (1891). Manual of the Legislature of New Jersey. Trenton, NJ: MacCrellish & Quigley. pp. 171–172 – via Google Books.
- U.S. Congress (1877). Official Congressional Directory. Washington, DC: US Government Printing Office. p. 43 – via Google Books.
- U.S. Congress (1893). Official Congressional Directory. Washington, DC: US Government Printing Office. p. 74 – via Google Books.
- U.S. Congress (1903). A Biographical Congressional Directory, 1774 to 1903. Washington, DC: US Government Printing Office. p. 676 – via Google Books.
- U.S. Congress (2005). Biographical Directory of the United States Congress, 1774-2005. Washington, DC: US Government Printing Office. p. 1504. ISBN 9780160731761 – via Google Books.

=== Newspapers ===
- Sleicher, John Albert (February 17, 1877). "Hon. John R. McPherson". Frank Leslie's Illustrated Newspaper. New York, NY. p. 397 – via Google Books.
- "Senator M'Pherson's Views". Chicago Tribune. Chicago, IL. March 5, 1888. p. 2 – via Newspapers.com.
- "Instructed for Cleveland". The Wilkes-Barre News. Wilkes-Barre, PA. May 27, 1892. p. 1 – via Newspapers.com.
- "Ex-Senator M'Pherson's Loss". The Philadelphia Inquirer. Philadelphia, PA. October 23, 1896. p. 7 – via Newspapers.com.
- "Saves McPherson". The Boston Globe. Boston, MA. May 19, 1897. p. 7 – via Newspapers.com.
- "Van Aken is Acquitted". New York World. New York, NY. June 22, 1897. p. 3 – via Newspapers.com.
- "Van Aken Pays a Fine". The Philadelphia Inquirer. Philadelphia, PA. June 25, 1897. p. 6 – via Newspapers.com.
- "John R. M'Pherson Dead". The New York Times. New York, NY. October 9, 1897. p. 1 – via Times Machine.
- "Laid at Rest: Former United States Senator McPherson Buried in Washington". Trenton Evening Times. Trenton, NJ. October 11, 1897. p. 1 – via Newspapers.com.
- "Wins Miss McPherson". The Boston Globe. Boston, MA. July 7, 1898. p. 7 – via Newspapers.com.
- "Mrs. M'Pherson's Will". Brooklyn Citizen. Brooklyn, NY. April 9, 1901. p. 1 – via Newspapers.com.
- "Edla Coleman Muir Dead". The Boston Globe. Boston, MA. December 31, 1901. p. 3 – via Newspapers.com.
- "Mrs. Low to Get $152,000". The New York Times. New York, NY. October 26, 1902. p. 12.

=== Magazines ===
- "The Chicago Convention". The Illustrated American. New York, NY: Illustrated American Publishing Company. June 25, 1892. p. 265 – via Google Books.
- "Death Notice, Gregory McPherson". Yale Law Journal. New Haven, CT: Yale Law Journal Company. December 1896. pp. 119–120 – via Google Books.

=== Internet ===
- Ostashay, Jan (November 2019). "Historic Assessment Report: 1531 Georgina Avenue, Santa Monica, CA" (PDF). SM Gov.net. City Planning Division, Santa Monica, California. p. 10.

U.S. Senate
Preceded by Frederick T. Frelinghuysen	U.S. senator (Class 2) from New Jersey; 1877–1895; Served alongside: Theodore F. Randolph, William J. Sewell, Rufus Blodgett, James Smith, Jr.	Succeeded by William J. Sewell
