= Jonathan F. Leaming =

American politician

Member of the New Jersey Senate from Cape May County
- In office 1877–1879
- Preceded by: Richard S. Leaming
- Succeeded by: Waters B. Miller
- In office 1862–1865
- Preceded by: Downs Edmunds
- Succeeded by: Wilmon W. Ware

Surrogate of Cape May County
- In office 1868–1877

Member of the New Jersey General Assembly from Cape May County
- In office 1861
- Preceded by: Abram Reeves
- Succeeded by: William W. Ware

Personal details
- Born: Jonathan Furman Leaming; September 7, 1822 Cape May County, New Jersey, U.S.
- Died: April 25, 1907 (aged 84) Cape May Court House, New Jersey, U.S.
- Party: Republican
- Spouse: Eliza H. Bennett (m. 1849)
- Relations: Richard Smith Leaming (second cousin once removed)
- Children: Walter S. Leaming; Edmund Bennett Leaming
- Parent(s): William F. Leaming (father); Sara Sophia Somers (mother)
- Education: Madison University; Brown University; Jefferson Medical School; Philadelphia Dental College

Jonathan Furman Leaming (September 7, 1822 – April 25, 1907) was an American physician and politician.

Leaming was born on September 7, 1822, in Cape May County, New Jersey, and was of English descent. His great-grandfather was the politician Aaron Leaming Jr. Leaming was the son of William F. Leaming and Sara Somers and had two sisters, Catherine and Julia. Leaming attended Madison University (now Colgate University) and Brown University. In 1846, he graduated from Jefferson Medical College. Leaming began practicing medicine in Cape May County the following year and did so for fourteen years before having to give up the practice due to poor health. He married Eliza Bennett on February 27, 1849. In 1854 his son Walter S. Leaming was born, who later became a state senator. Another son, Edmund, was born in 1857 and also became a politician. Leaming graduated from the Philadelphia Dental College in 1860 and subsequently practiced dentistry. Leaming held a number of county-level offices, including superintendent of schools, county school examiner, and trustee of the State Normal School.

In 1861 Leaming was elected to the New Jersey Assembly as a Republican. He was elected to the New Jersey Senate in 1862. Leaming served on the committee that granted Rutgers University its agricultural endowment. Leaming was elected surrogate of Cape May County in 1868 and re-elected in 1873. He resigned from this position in 1877 to return to the state senate, serving until 1880. Leaming served a number of roles in the Baptist religious organization including deacon, clerk, teacher, and Sunday school superintendent. Leaming married Josephine Young, a sister of his first wife, on October 24, 1888. He retired from public life in 1898 after an attack of poor health.

On April 22, 1907, a fire broke out in Leaming's house in Cape May Court House, New Jersey. His daughter, Helen F. Leaming, rescued him from the flames and was also severely burned. Leaming died on April 25, 1907, from complications from the burns, aged 84.
