= James N. Pidcock =

American politician (1836–1899)

James Nelson Pidcock
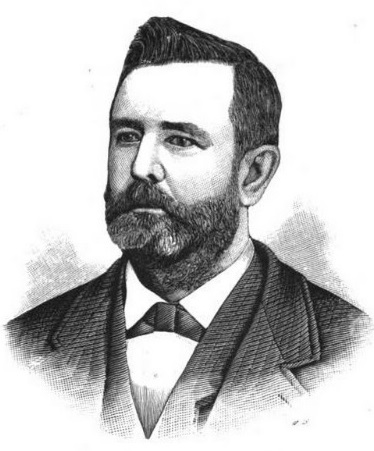
- From 1881's History of Hunterdon and Somerset Counties, New Jersey.

Member of the U.S. House of Representatives from New Jersey's 4th district
- In office March 4, 1885 – March 3, 1889
- Preceded by: Benjamin Franklin Howey
- Succeeded by: Samuel Fowler

Member of the New Jersey Senate from Hunterdon County
- In office 1877–1880
- Preceded by: Frederic A. Potts
- Succeeded by: Eli Bosenbury

Personal details
- Born: February 8, 1836 Whitehouse Station, New Jersey, U.S.
- Died: December 17, 1899 (aged 63) Whitehouse Station, New Jersey, U.S.
- Party: Democratic
- Children: 6
- Relatives: Alvah A. Clark (cousin)
- Profession: Politician; railroad executive

James Nelson Pidcock (February 8, 1836 – December 17, 1899) was an American Democratic Party politician who represented New Jersey's 4th congressional district in the United States House of Representatives for two terms from 1885 to 1889.

== Early life ==
James Nelson Pidcock was born on February 8, 1836, in Whitehouse Station, Hunterdon County, New Jersey. He attended district schools and Lebanon Grammar School in Lebanon.

== Career ==
From 1850 to 1857, he worked in civil engineering. He engaged in agricultural pursuits and was also a dealer in livestock after 1857.

In 1873, Pidcock ran for the New Jersey Senate, but lost. From 1877 to 1880, he served as member of the New Jersey Senate from Hunterdon County. He served as delegate to the Democratic National Conventions in 1884 and 1888.

Pidcock was elected as a Democrat to the Forty-ninth and Fiftieth Congresses, serving in office from March 4, 1885 – March 3, 1889, but was not a candidate for renomination in 1888.

After leaving Congress, he again resumed his agricultural pursuits. He was involved in the construction of the Georgia Northern Railroad in southern Georgia, where he owned large timber tracts. He served as president of the board of managers of the New Jersey State Hospital for the Insane from 1891 to 1896. He was an orchardist and grew peaches in New Jersey. He helped organize and was the president of Rockaway Valley Railroad.

== Personal life ==
Pidcock married twice. He had six children. He was a cousin of Alvah A. Clark.

Pidcock died on December 17, 1899, at his home in Whitehouse Station. He was interred in Elmwood Cemetery in Lebanon.

U.S. House of Representatives
Preceded by Benjamin F. Howey	Member of the U.S. House of Representatives from New Jersey's 4th congressional district March 4, 1885—March 3, 1889	Succeeded by Samuel Fowler
