= Levi D. Jarrard =

American politician

Levi Dalrymple Jarrard

Member of the New Jersey Senate from Middlesex County
- In office 1871–1876

Personal details
- Born: August 3, 1824 Warren County, New Jersey
- Died: April 26, 1886 (aged 61) New Jersey State Prison; Trenton, Mercer County, New Jersey
- Party: Republican
- Spouse(s): Jane Lewis Trowbridge; Margaret Evans
- Occupation: Businessman

Levi Dalrymple Jarrard (August 3, 1824 – April 26, 1886) was a New Jersey businessman and politician, who served as a New Jersey State Senator (1871–1876), Collector of Middlesex County, New Jersey (1876–1881), and Postmaster of New Brunswick, New Jersey (1881–1883). His career ended in scandal, which resulted in a ten-year prison sentence. He died during his sentence at the New Jersey State Prison in Trenton.

== Biography ==
=== Early life and career ===
Levi Jarrard was the son of Jonas Jarrard, a wagon maker, and Ereminah Dalrymple. Levi married first to Jane Lewis Trowbridge, and had three children: David, William and Mary Jane. Jane died on August 9, 1848, in Pennsylvania. Not long after, Jarrard married secondly on December 24, 1849, to Margaret Evans, a daughter of William and Elizabeth (Snyder) Evans. They had a total of eleven children: James, Ellen, Elwood, William, Winfield, Esther, Henry, Elizabeth, Charles, Frederick and Emma.

He worked first as a ship chandler and later became the Superintendent of the Delaware and Raritan Towing Company. He also owned a tobacco plant and a grocery store.

Jarrard was elected to the New Jersey State Senate for Middlesex County in 1871. He held this position until 1876. Afterward, he served as Collector of Middlesex County, New Jersey. In 1881, Jarrard succeed Joseph F. Fisher as US Postmaster of New Brunswick, having been appointed by President Chester A. Arthur and serving from 1881 until 1883.

=== Scandal ===
On May 18, 1883, he was reported missing. At the time he went missing, Jarrard was postmaster for New Brunswick, New Jersey. While he was missing, the books at his office were reviewed, and large amounts of money appeared to be missing, and suspicions arose that Jarrard had stolen over $20,000. When it became apparent that he would not return, a dispute arose as to who would succeed him as county collector. County Collector Fisher, who preceded Jarrard in office, had also been accused of stealing money. When the dispute worsened, President Chester A. Arthur stepped in to settle the dispute by selecting John F. Babcock as postmaster on June 8, 1883.

In June 1883, Jarrard was accused of stealing $39,000 from the county and falsifying the books. A $1,000 reward for his capture was issued by the Board of Freeholders of New Brunswick on July 7, 1883.

=== Exile ===
It was later discovered that Levi Jarrard fled to Canada, and spent most of his time in Niagara Falls. He had leased a hotel at Windsor, and called it the British-American Hotel. He was furnishing it at the time when he was questioned by detectives sent by Pinkerton. At this time, he was living under an assumed name. Jarrard was detained at Niagara Falls, Ontario, on the afternoon of August 1, 1883, and held there at police headquarters. He was arrested and remanded by Judge Baxter of County Welland. New Brunswick lawyers J. Kearney Rice and Robert Adrian went to Canada to participate in the extradition case. They met Jarrard at Police Headquarters, where Jarrard was delighted to see them. Afterward, Jarrard was put in jail to await the extradition trial. On August 27, his trial began in the County Welland court, with Judge Baxter presiding. On December 17, 1883, the Court of Common Pleas dismissed Jarrard's attempt to be discharged. The Chief-Justice stated that they have accused Jarrard of forgery and that he had stolen an estimated $36,000.

The extradition case was argued in the Court of Appeals on February 5, 1884. In the case, Jarrard's defense was that he owned the books that were allegedly altered and that a clerk altered them. He also said that Freehold Evans of the finance committee had audited the account and said it was correct. The extradition case was settled on March 4, 1884, in a unanimous decision. Jarrard was charged with forgery.

=== Trial ===
Constable Loper and Detective Wood brought him back to New Jersey. Loper later testified in court that Jarrard was traveling under the name of H. Beaver. Anticipating Jarrard's arrival, Sherriff Disham had "two cells cleaned and furnished as comfortably as possible, one for use as a sleeping room, the other for use as a reception room." Jarrard was put on trial in New Brunswick on April 22, 1884, on a charge of forgery. In court, he was represented by Howard McSherry, William T. Hoffman, a former judge, and Counselor Ryerson. On April 24, Ryerson opened up the defense by blaming Jarrard's clerk, Deshler, for altering the data in the books. David Gilliand, a janitor for Jarrard, testified that Jarrard was out of town in New York the day that Deshler claims Jarrard told him to change the forgeries in the book. Days later, Gilliand testifies that he saw Deshler in the Collector's office, and saw that Deshler was "scratching something out with an eraser." When Gilliand questioned him, Deshler told him that he was "trying to save himself—or 'the boss'—from State prison" and order Gilliand not to say anything about it. During a cross-examination, Gilliand had admitted to have been frequently in prison. When it was Jarrard's turn to testify, he stated that he was not in the Collector's office on May 14, but in New York, confirming Gilliand's statements. On April 26, Jarrard was convicted of forgery; sentencing was postponed for two weeks, because Jarrard had requested a new trial, which was pending. However, the sentencing actually occurred on April 29; he was sentenced to 10 years in prison and was to pay a fine of $1,000 for forgery.

=== Death ===
Jarrard died during his sentence on April 26, 1886. Previously, his friends, fellow politicians, and family had signed a petition for his release, but it was refused. His widow, Margaret, later joined their son in Michigan.

== See also ==
- Levi D. Jarrard House - his private residence
