= George C. Ludlow =

American judge

George Craig Ludlow
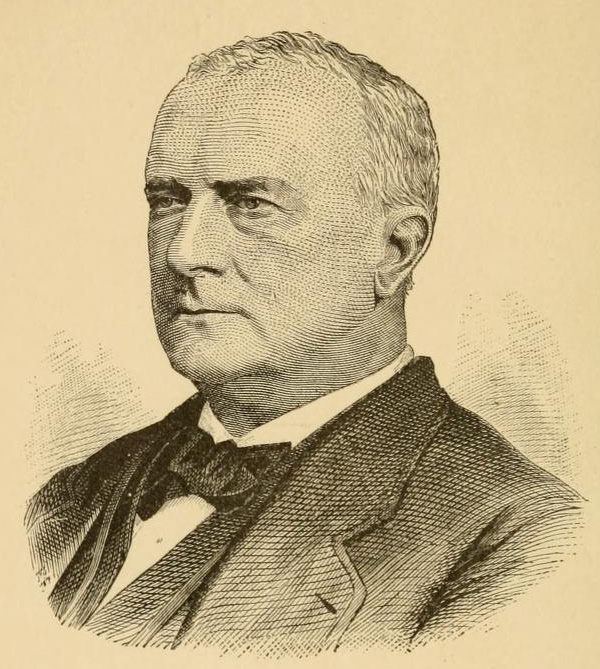

25th Governor of New Jersey
- In office January 18, 1881 – January 15, 1884
- Preceded by: George B. McClellan
- Succeeded by: Leon Abbett

President of the New Jersey Senate
- In office 1878
- Preceded by: Leon Abbett
- Succeeded by: William J. Sewell

Member of the New Jersey Senate from Middlesex County
- In office 1876–1880

Personal details
- Born: April 6, 1830 Milford, New Jersey, U.S.
- Died: December 18, 1900 (aged 70) New Brunswick, New Jersey, U.S.
- Party: Democratic
- Education: Rutgers University

George Craig Ludlow (April 6, 1830 – December 18, 1900) was an American Democratic Party politician, who served as the 25th governor of New Jersey from 1881 to 1884.

== Early life ==
George Craig Ludlow was born in Milford, New Jersey, on April 6, 1830. His father Cornelius Ludlow and grandfather Benjamin Ludlow were both active in Democratic Party politics.

In 1835, the Ludlow family moved to New Brunswick, New Jersey, where George would remain for the rest of his life.

Ludlow graduated from Rutgers College in 1850 and opened a law practice in 1853. He was private counsel for the Pennsylvania Railroad.

== Early political career ==
In 1876, he was elected to represent Middlesex County in the New Jersey Senate. In 1878, he was chosen as Senate President.

== Governor of New Jersey ==
=== 1880 campaign ===
In 1880, the New Jersey Democratic convention nominated Ludlow for Governor. His nomination was largely the result of an alliance between Leon Abbett and the "State House Ring," a group of influential state legislators opposed to Abbett's rivals.

In the general election, Ludlow faced Republican Frederic A. Potts. Both candidates were closely associated with the railroad industry; Ludlow as counsel for the Pennsylvania and Potts as an influential stockholder in the Jersey Central Railroad. In the end, Ludlow won by a mere 651 votes of some 250,000 ballots cast, the closest result in New Jersey history by raw votes and the closest by percentage margin until 1981.

=== Term in office ===
Ludlow entered office facing Republican control of both houses of the legislature and amid rumors that the Pennsylvania Railroad had ordered its employees to vote for him. He was also beholden to the State House Ring for his nomination and had little power within his own party. Overall, his administration has been characterized as "honest and diligent but basically unproductive."

In 1882, Ludlow vetoed a bill to allow the Central Railroad of New Jersey's board of directors to increase the corporation's capital stock without shareholder approval, thus removing control from the stockholders. He denounced the bill as immoral and unjust. However, the veto was overridden by large majorities of both houses. In the same session, Ludlow vetoed a bill to limit public access to large areas of the Jersey City waterfront, which would have aided the Pennsylvania Railroad in a legal battle against the city. He denounced that bill as "an abuse of legislative power and a violation of the principles of fair dealing and justice." The bill was passed again by the Senate but derailed in the Assembly amid bribery charges and a legislative investigation.

Ludlow's term was also dominated by difficulty balancing the state budget following the 1880 abolition of the state tax and his own desire for further tax relief. After running a deficit of approximately $281,000.00 in 1882 (equivalent to $9,374,741 in 2025), Ludlow placed greater emphasis on increasing taxes on corporations, especially railroads. Ludlow was also the first governor to devote attention to clean water access; established a council to oversee asylums, prisons, jails and almhouses; and signed a law classifying municipalities into four groups.

=== Post-governorship ===
In 1894, Ludlow served on the twenty-member commission established to recommend amendments to the state constitution.

In 1895, Governor George T. Werts appointed Ludlow to serve on the New Jersey Supreme Court.

== Death and burial ==
Ludlow died in New Brunswick on December 18, 1900, from heart disease and was buried in Elmwood Cemetery in North Brunswick, New Jersey. He was survived by a wife and two sons.

== See also ==
- List of governors of New Jersey

Political offices
Preceded by Leon Abbett	President of the New Jersey Senate; 1878	Succeeded by William J. Sewell
Preceded by George B. McClellan	Governor of New Jersey; 1881–1884	Succeeded by Leon Abbett
Party political offices
Preceded by George B. McClellan	Democratic Nominee for Governor of New Jersey; 1880	Succeeded by Leon Abbett
