= Leon Abbett =

American politician and judge (1836–1894)

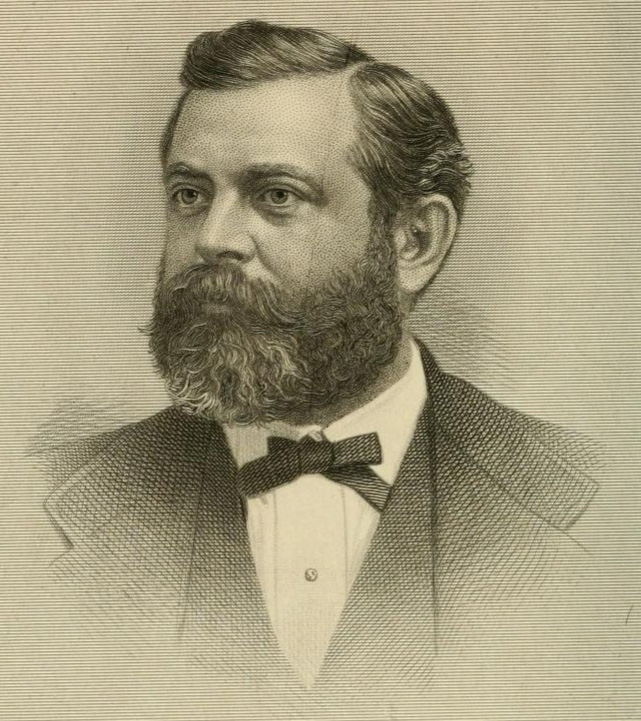

26th Governor of New Jersey
- In office January 15, 1884 – January 18, 1887
- Preceded by: George C. Ludlow
- Succeeded by: Robert Stockton Green
- In office January 21, 1890 – January 17, 1893
- Preceded by: Robert Stockton Green
- Succeeded by: George T. Werts

Member of the New Jersey Senate from Hudson County
- In office 1875–1878
- Preceded by: John R. McPherson
- Succeeded by: Rudolph F. Rabe

Member of the New Jersey General Assembly from Hudson County
- In office 1865–1867; 1869–1870

Personal details
- Born: October 8, 1836 Philadelphia, Pennsylvania, U.S.
- Died: December 4, 1894 (aged 58) Jersey City, New Jersey, U.S.
- Party: Democratic
- Spouse: Mary Briggs
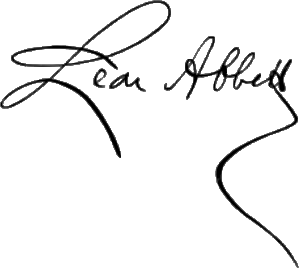
- Signature

Leon Abbett (October 8, 1836 – December 4, 1894) was an American Democratic Party politician and lawyer who served two nonconsecutive terms as the 26th Governor of New Jersey from 1884 to 1887 and 1890 to 1893. His official state biography refers to Abbett as "undoubtedly the most powerful person in New Jersey in the late nineteenth century" and "the first urban-oriented governor" of New Jersey. He was popularly known as the "Great Commoner" for his advocacy on behalf of ordinary citizens, and presided over a wide range of reforms during his time as governor. He failed in two attempts to win election to the United States Senate.

== Early life ==
Abbett was born in Philadelphia on October 8, 1836 to Ezekiel and Sarah M. Abbett (née Howell). His father was a journeyman hatter. His mother was born to a prominent but not wealthy family in Mauricetown, New Jersey and operated a millinery shop.

He graduated from Central High School in 1853. His classmates included Henry George and Ignatius Donnelly.

After graduating high school, Abbett read law and served as a law clerk in the office of U.S. Attorney for the Eastern District of Pennsylvania John W. Ashmead. He was admitted to the bar in 1857, engaging in practice with his instructor. After struggling to attract clients in Philadelphia, Abbett moved to Hoboken, New Jersey in 1859 and became corporation counsel for Jersey City. In April 1861, he moved to New York City and formed a law partnership with William J. Fuller, a distinguished patent and admiralty lawyer, until 1866.

== Early political career ==
=== New Jersey General Assembly ===
In 1864, Abbett entered politics by campaigning for General George McClellan's presidential campaign against Abraham Lincoln. In the same election, Abbett was elected to represent Hoboken in the New Jersey General Assembly.

In the Assembly, Abbett was aligned with the party's anti-war Copperhead wing and a staunch advocate of states' rights. Though Abbett was philosophically opposed to slavery, he opposed the Emancipation Proclamation and both the Thirteenth and Fifteenth Amendments to the United States Constitution. He opposed the expansion of federal power during the Reconstruction era. He gained statewide recognition by defending Democratic U.S. Senator John P. Stockton after his expulsion by the Republican Senate.

In 1867, Abbett moved to Jersey City to broaden his political base. He was re-elected to the General Assembly for the next two years and elevated to Speaker of the Assembly. During the 1870s, Abbett allied himself with the powerful Camden and Amboy Railroad monopoly.

=== New Jersey State Senate ===
As a Protestant in a county with a growing Irish constituency, Abbett courted the Irish vote by working to soften the Protestant tone of school prayer requirements and distributing patronage jobs to Irish residents. In 1871, Abbett spoke out against the state revision of the Jersey City charter, which removed many Irish officeholders in the name of anti-corruption and replaced them with appointed commissioners. In 1874, Abbett was elected to the State Senate from Hudson County by promising to restore home rule.

With John R. McPherson, Abbett worked to temper remaining nativism within the state Democratic Party. Abbett broke sharply with the dominant "State House Ring," led by former Governor and Hudson County Senator Theodore Fitz Randolph, by supporting Robert Gilchrist against Randolph. This effort failed, but Abbett successfully backed McPherson for the state's other Senate seat in 1877.

Abbett kept his campaign pledge by obtaining passage of a reform municipal charter restoring home rule and gained further support from Catholics by passage of a "Liberty of Conscience" bill allowing priests access to state penal and mental institutions.

In 1877, Abbett was elevated to the Senate presidency. He won support from organized labor by sponsoring a statute requiring employers to pay in cash. He drafted an additional statute giving employees of the bankrupt Jersey Central Railroad the right to claim their salaries as a prior lien on the assets of the company.

=== 1877 and 1880 gubernatorial elections ===
Abbett first sought the governorship in 1877, but was blocked by the State House Ring in favor of George B. McClellan. Abbett showed party loyalty by campaigning for McClellan through the fall.

Abbett left office at the end of his term but remained a major player in Hudson County and state politics as corporation counsel for Jersey City. After the death of his wife in 1879, he briefly left politics entirely. He returned in 1880 upon learning that his rival, Orestes Cleveland, was seeking the governor's office. As chairman of the state convention, Abbett steered the nomination to George C. Ludlow, who won the general election.

During the Ludlow administration, Abbett was active in efforts to tax the state's railroad monopoly, bringing him into direct conflict with the established order of business and politics.

== Governor of New Jersey ==
=== 1883 gubernatorial election ===
In 1883, Abbett was nominated for Governor for the first time. He conducted a vigorous campaign in favor of railroad taxation. Though he campaigned throughout the state, the race was centered on Jersey City, since the Republican candidate was Jersey City judge Jonathan Dixon, who had drafted the famous state charter of 1871 and had an anti-labor reputation as a jurist. Abbett defeated Dixon by 103,856 votes to 97,047.

=== First term (1884–87) ===
Abbett made the rail tax issue a major thrust of his inaugural message, setting up his first term for conflict with the railroads. Through skillful publicity and threatening to withhold appropriations until the tax was passed, Abbett won the legislative struggle. The railroads then sought court relief, challenging the tax as unconstitutional. The opposition also failed to impeach Patrick Laverty, the state prison warden, during this time.

Several other bills were enacted to cope with urban industrialism, including the abolition of convict labor for private profit, tighter regulations on working conditions for women and children, and refinancing provisions for the bankrupt cities of Elizabeth and Rahway.

Abbett maintained his practice of appointment by spoils, displeasing civil service reformers. In retaliation, the Republican legislature stripped him of control of many appointments.

As governor, Abbett dramatically reversed his earlier positions on race, urging the passage of a bill to allow former slaves burial at an all-white cemetery and serving as the godfather of a black child in Newark baptized as Leon Abbett DeKalb in days when interracial baptism was rare.

=== 1887 U.S. Senate election ===
Prohibited from seeking a second consecutive term in 1886, Abbett instead sought election to the U.S. Senate in early 1887. However, conservative pro-rail Democrats identified with the State House Ring withheld their support from Abbett, leading to the election of Rufus Blodgett instead. Abbett took the defeat hard and became legal counsel for the state liquor dealers' association, an important source of campaign funds.

=== 1889 gubernatorial election ===
Abbett remained popular in his time out of office and was recruited to run for a second non-consecutive term in 1889. After securing a twofold pay raise for the office, Abbett agreed to run. He faced Republican iron magnate and Civil War hero Edward Burd Grubb Jr. and defeated him by a wide margin of over 14,000 votes, though at least some of his support in Jersey City was fraudulent.

=== Second term (1890–93) ===
On his return to office, Abbett seized on outrage over the fraud in the 1889 election by proposing a ballot reform law. Working with a friendly Democratic legislature, he also oversaw passage of a package of labor laws, free public libraries, scholarships for the agricultural college at Rutgers, highway improvements, increased funding for public schools, and the establishment of the state department of banking and insurance. His appointments were a mix of competent men and corrupt Hudson County machine workers.

In 1890, Abbett defused a labor strike at the Clark Thread Mills in Kearney, where management had hired Pinkerton detectives as strikebreakers, by deputizing the Jersey City police to restore order. He then called for the establishment of the first state police force.

In 1891, Abbett again intervened in a labor dispute at the Oxford Iron and Nail Company in Warren County, where workers were starved by a winter lockout. Following this incident, he called for new laws regulating mine safety.

In his second term, Abbett also vetoed bills legalizing gambling at horse-racing tracks and incorporating the Reading Railroad Coal Combine. He successfully appealed for public support to sustain both vetoes.

=== 1893 U.S. Senate election ===
With his term expiring, Abbett once again sought election to the Senate in 1893 but was again defeated.

In 1893, he was appointed a judge on the state supreme court, at that time an intermediate appellate court.

== Death and legacy ==
Abbett died in 1894 in his Jersey City home after an attack of diabetes. He was buried in Green-Wood Cemetery in Brooklyn, New York.

== Personal life ==
Abbett married Mary Briggs of Philadelphia on October 8, 1862. Mary was the daughter of Philadelphia judge Amos Briggs. They had two sons and a daughters. She died of cancer at forty years old in 1879. Abbett never remarried.

=== Appearance ===
Abbett was short and stocky, standing five feet eight inches and weighing about 175 pounds. He had a round face with a high forehead, broad shoulders, brown wavy hair, bright blue eyes, and large bushy eyebrows. He sported a wide mustache and full beard for his entire public career.

=== Honors and memberships ===
Abbett received the degree LL.D. from the College of New Jersey in 1884.

Abett was a Freemason. He was a Master of Mystic Tie Lodge No 272 in New York, but later moved to Varick Lodge No 31 in Jersey City, New Jersey. He was the Grand Representative of Ireland near the Grand Lodge of New Jersey from 1886 to 1894. He was also a Royal Arch Mason, a member of Ancient Chapter No 1, New York City.

Political offices
| Preceded by William J. Sewell | President of the New Jersey Senate; 1877 | Succeeded by George C. Ludlow |
| Preceded by George C. Ludlow | Governor of New Jersey; January 15, 1884 – January 18, 1887 | Succeeded by Robert Stockton Green |
| Preceded by Robert Stockton Green | Governor of New Jersey; January 21, 1890 – January 17, 1893 | Succeeded by George T. Werts |
Party political offices
| Preceded by George C. Ludlow | Democratic Nominee for Governor of New Jersey; 1883 | Succeeded by Robert Stockton Green |
| Preceded by Robert Stockton Green | Democratic Nominee for Governor of New Jersey; 1889 | Succeeded by George Theodore Werts |
