= Frederic A. Potts =

American politician (1836–1888)

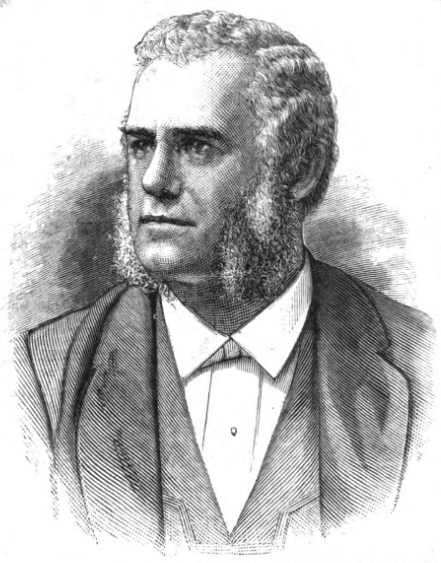
- Potts in Frank Leslie's Illustrated Newspaper, September 11, 1880

Member of the New Jersey Senate from Hunterdon County
- In office 1874–1877
- Preceded by: David H. Banghart
- Succeeded by: James N. Pidcock

Personal details
- Born: April 4, 1836 Pottsville, Pennsylvania, U.S.
- Died: November 9, 1888 (aged 52) New York City, New York, U.S.
- Party: Republican

Frederic Augustus Potts (April 4, 1836 – November 9, 1888) was an American businessman and Republican party politician who was the Republican nominee for Governor of New Jersey in 1880.

Potts was born in 1836 in Pottsville, Pennsylvania to George Alexander Henry and Emily Dilworth (Gumming) Potts. His father was the head of the New York branch of the wholesale coal and iron firm of Lewis Audenried & Company. Potts followed in his father's footsteps, working in the coal and iron business in New York City. He controlled an extensive business as a coal merchant.

Potts had a farm in Pittstown, Hunterdon County, New Jersey, and from this base he was recruited to become the Republican candidate for the House of Representatives in New Jersey's 4th congressional district. He was defeated, although by a narrower than usual margin in a district that was known as "the Democratic Gibraltar." He was elected to the New Jersey Senate in 1873 as a Republican, breaking a long succession of Democratic victories in the Hunterdon County stretching "since the days of the Jackson." He ran for the House of Representatives seat again in 1878 and lost by only 620 votes.

In 1880 he was the Republican nominee for Governor of New Jersey and was defeated by the Democratic nominee, George C. Ludlow, by a margin of 651 votes of some 250,000 ballots cast.

Prior to 1880, Potts was a director of the Central Railroad of New Jersey. In 1880 he reorganized the New Jersey Midland Railroad, which merged with other railroads to form the New York, Susquehanna and Western Railway.

He was elected president of the railway and remained in this position until his death. He died in 1888 at his family residence in New York at the age of 52.[3]

== Bibliography ==
- Lucas, Walter Arndt (1980) [1939]. The History of the New York, Susquehanna and Western Railroad (second ed.). Railroadians of America. LCCN 82163920.
- Mohowski, Robert E. (2003). The New York, Susquehanna & Western Railroad. Baltimore: Johns Hopkins University Press. ISBN 9780801872228.

Party political offices
Preceded by William A. Newell	Republican Nominee for Governor of New Jersey; 1880	Succeeded by Jonathan Dixon
