= Richard S. Leaming =

Member of the New Jersey Senate

Member of the New Jersey Senate from Cape May County
- In office 1874–1877
- Preceded by: Thomas Beesley
- Succeeded by: Jonathan F. Leaming

Personal details
- Born: June 17, 1828 South Dennis, New Jersey
- Died: May 25, 1895 (aged 66) Dennisville, New Jersey
- Party: Republican

Richard S. Leaming (July 16, 1828 – May 25, 1895) was an American ship builder and politician from New Jersey who served in both the New Jersey General Assembly and the New Jersey Senate and on the Cape May County Board of Chosen Freeholders.

Leaming was born on July 16, 1828, in South Dennis, New Jersey. His father, Jeremiah Leaming, had also served in the New Jersey Senate.

By profession, Leaming was a ship builder, and was described at the time as having been "successful in his operations".

Leaming became a member of the Republican Party when it was created and represented Dennis Township on the Cape May County Board of Chosen Freeholders in 1862 and from 1869 to 1872. He was elected to both houses of the New Jersey Legislature, serving in the New Jersey General Assembly from 1871 to 1873 and in the New Jersey Senate from 1874 to 1876.

He died in Dennisville on May 25, 1895.
