= George Dayton (politician) =

American politician (1827–1902)

Member of the New Jersey Senate from Bergen County
- In office 1875 – 1878
- Preceded by: Cornelius Lydecker
- Succeeded by: Cornelius S. Cooper

Personal details
- Born: October 2, 1827 Troy, New York
- Died: 1902 (aged 74–75) Closter, New Jersey

George Dayton (October 2, 1827 – November 1902) was a New Jersey merchant and politician.

Dayton lived in Union Township in what is now Rutherford, New Jersey, where he was a successful hardware merchant. He was elected as a Democrat to represent Bergen County in the New Jersey Senate for one term from 1875 to 1877. Dayton "dropped out of sight after his term in the Senate", moving to Closter, in 1890 and becoming the clerk of Harrington Township, New Jersey.

George Dayton was the great grandson of Jonathan Dayton and great-great-grandson of Elias Dayton. Dayton had a brother, Jesse C. Dayton, who served in the New York State Senate at the same time as his own service in the New Jersey Senate.

Dayton died in 1902, at the age of 75, after an illness of several months. He was buried in Brookside Cemetery in Englewood, New Jersey, on November 20, 1902.
