= William J. Sewell =

American politician

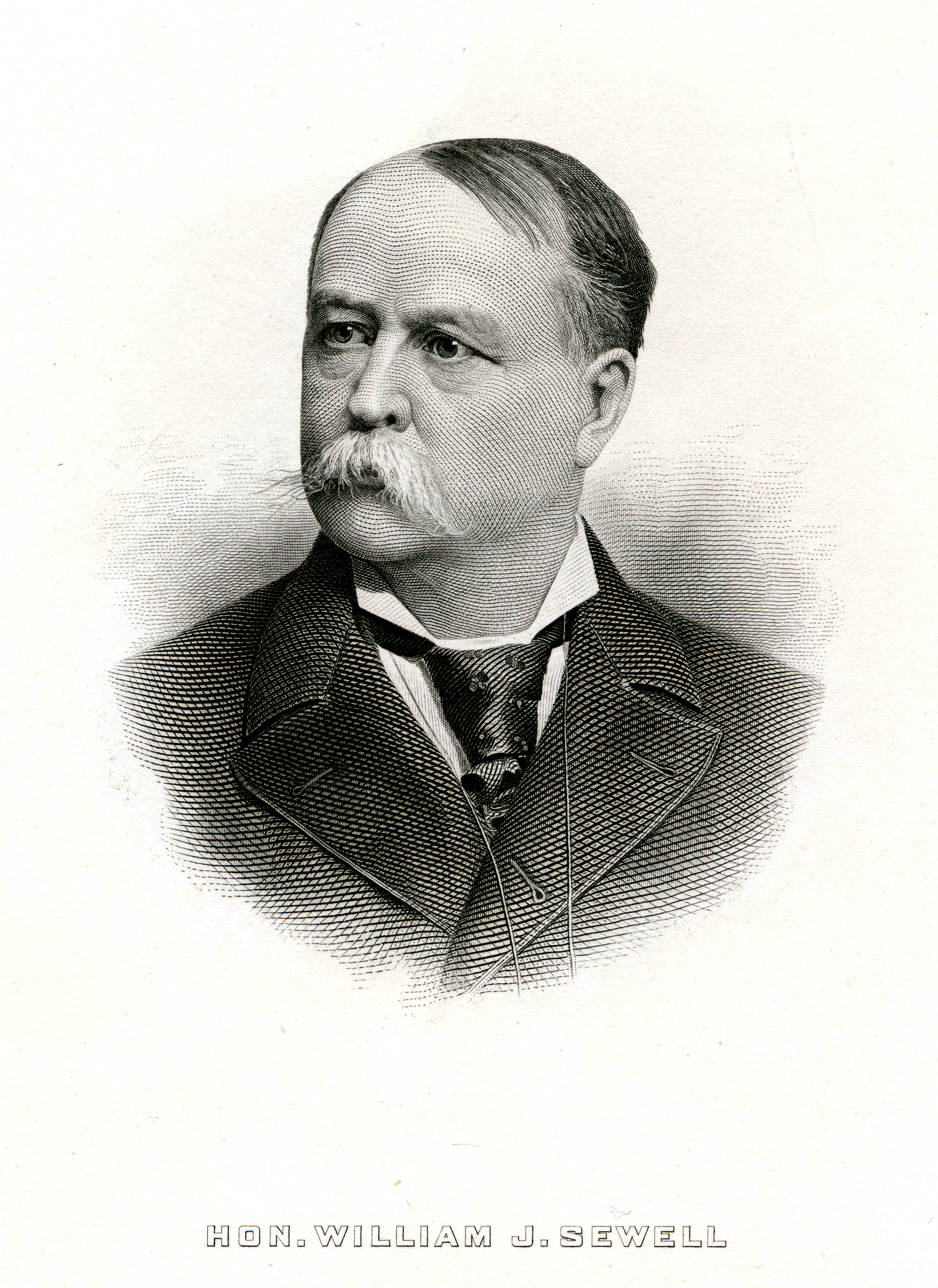
- Medal of Honor recipient

United States Senator from New Jersey
- In office March 4, 1881 – March 3, 1887
- Preceded by: Theodore F. Randolph
- Succeeded by: Rufus Blodgett
- In office March 4, 1895 – December 27, 1901
- Preceded by: John R. McPherson
- Succeeded by: John F. Dryden

President of the New Jersey Senate
- In office 1876
- Preceded by: John W. Taylor
- Succeeded by: Leon Abbett
- In office 1879–1880
- Preceded by: George C. Ludlow
- Succeeded by: Garret Hobart

Member of the New Jersey Senate from Camden County
- In office 1872 – March 4, 1881
- Preceded by: Edward Bettle
- Succeeded by: Albert Merritt

Personal details
- Born: December 6, 1835 Castlebar, County Mayo, Ireland
- Died: December 27, 1901 (aged 66) Camden, New Jersey, U.S.
- Resting place: Harleigh Cemetery; Camden, New Jersey, U.S.
- Awards: Medal of Honor

Military service
- Allegiance: United States; Union
- Branch/service: United States Army; Union Army
- Years of service: 1861–1865
- Rank: Colonel; Brevet Major General
- Commands: 5th New Jersey Volunteer Infantry
- Battles/wars: American Civil War: Battle of Chancellorsville (WIA); Battle of Gettysburg (WIA)

William Joyce Sewell (December 6, 1835 – December 27, 1901) was an American Republican Party politician, merchant, and military officer who served as a U.S. senator from New Jersey for two non-consecutive terms from 1881 to 1887 and 1895 until his death in 1901.

Sewell was born in Castlebar, County Mayo, Ireland. He immigrated to the United States in 1851, where he worked in the merchant industry in Chicago, Illinois, before moving to Camden, New Jersey in 1860. He served as an officer in the Union Army during the American Civil War, receiving the Medal of Honor for his actions at the Battle of Chancellorsville. He was also a Reconstruction Era state senator and U.S. Senator. The community of Sewell, New Jersey, is named for him.

== Personal details ==
He was married with four children, two daughters and two sons. He immigrated from Ireland when he was a young boy.

== Civil War ==
Sewell began his Civil War service as a captain with the 5th New Jersey Volunteer Infantry on August 28, 1861. He was promoted to lieutenant colonel on July 7, 1862, and colonel on January 6, 1863. Sewell commanded a brigade at the Battle of Chancellorsville, Virginia, where he was wounded. He was awarded the Medal of Honor in 1896 for his actions. Sewell was the only officer to be awarded the Medal of Honor while in command of a New Jersey regiment.

Sewell was severely wounded again at the Battle of Gettysburg, Pennsylvania, while commanding his unit along Emmitsburg Road on the second day of the battle, July 2, 1863. His wounds forced him from the field for a significant period. He resigned on July 6, 1863, and returned on October 1, 1864. On his return, he was given command of the 38th New Jersey Volunteer Infantry, but his wounds eventually caused him to end his Civil War field service. He was reassigned as commander of Fort Powhatan in the Department of Virginia from January to April 1865. Sewell was mustered out of the volunteers on June 30, 1865.

In recognition of Sewell's service, on January 13, 1866, President Andrew Johnson nominated Sewell for appointment to the brevet grade of brigadier general, United States Volunteers for "gallant and meritorious services at the Battle of Chancellorsville, Va.," to rank from March 13, 1865, and the U.S. Senate confirmed the appointment on March 12, 1866. On July 18, 1868, President Andrew Johnson nominated Sewell for appointment to the brevet grade of major general of volunteers for "gallant and meritorious services during the war," to rank from March 13, 1865 and the U.S. Senate confirmed the appointment on July 23, 1868.

== Politics ==
After the war, Sewell started in the railroad industry as a yardmaster for the Camden and Amboy Railroad and Transportation Company and eventually became the president of the West Jersey and Seashore Railroad. Sewell was then elected to the State senate, serving from 1872 until 1881, and as the senate's president in 1876 from 1879 to 1880. Subsequently, he was elected to the United States Senate as a Republican and served from March 4, 1881, to March 3, 1887. During this period he chaired the Committee on Enrolled Bills (Forty-seventh Congress and Forty-eighth Congress), the Committee on Military Affairs (Forty-ninth Congress), and the Committee on the Library (Forty-ninth Congress).

He held the post as chairman of the New Jersey delegation at the Republican National Convention five times. He was also President of the West Jersey and Seashore Railroad Company, a post he held until his death.

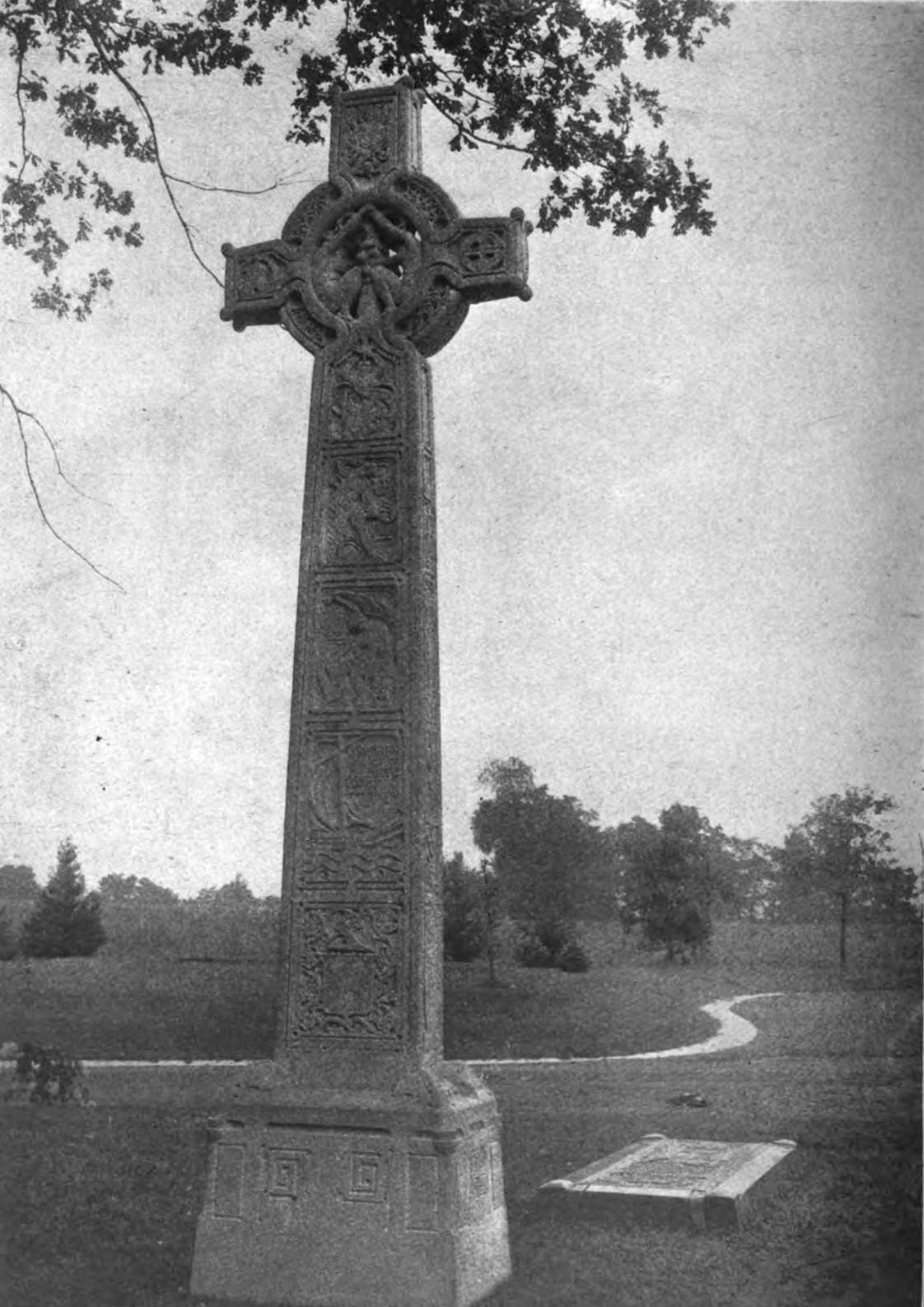
Sewell Monument (1901), Harleigh Cemetery, Camden, New Jersey, Alexander Stirling Calder, sculptor

Sewell served as one of the national commissioners for New Jersey to the World's Columbian Exposition in Chicago in 1893, commanded the Second Brigade of the National Guard of New Jersey, and was appointed a member of the Board of Managers of the National Home for Disabled Volunteer Soldiers. He was an unsuccessful candidate for reelection in 1887, 1889 and 1893, but was again elected to the United States Senate in 1895, serving from 1895 until 1901. During this term, he chaired the Committee on Enrolled Bills (Fifty-fourth Congress through Fifty-seventh Congress).

== Death ==
Sewell died of complications from heart disease and diabetes at 9:40am on December 27, 1901, at age 66, in his home at Camden, New Jersey. His vacant Senate seat was filled by Prudential Insurance founder John F. Dryden. Sewell received full Military Honors at the funeral by both the State National Guard and the Federal Military. During the funeral, official state business was suspended in Camden as a token of respect for his service. He was buried in Harleigh Cemetery, in Camden, New Jersey, in the Spring Grove Section, Lot 75. His grave is marked by a cross designed by sculptor Alexander Stirling Calder.

== Legacy ==
In 2005, a government-issued Medal of Honor marker was erected on his grave site. He is one of three Civil War Union Brevet Generals interred in Harleigh, the others being Colonel George C. Burling of the 6th New Jersey Volunteer Infantry and Colonel Timothy C. Moore of the 34th New Jersey Volunteer Infantry.

== Medal of Honor citation ==

Rank and Organization:

Colonel, 5th New Jersey Infantry. Place and Date: At Chancellorsville, Va., May 3, 1863. Entered Service At: Camden, N.J. Born: December 6, 1835, Castlebar, Ireland. Date of Issue: March 25, 1896.

Citation:

Assuming command of a brigade, he rallied around his colors a mass of men from other regiments and fought these troops with great brilliancy through several hours of desperate conflict, remaining in command though wounded and inspiring them by his presence and the gallantry of his personal example.

== See also ==
- List of Medal of Honor recipients
- List of American Civil War Medal of Honor recipients: Q–S
- List of United States senators born outside the United States
- List of members of the United States Congress who died in office (1900–1949)

== Notes ==
U.S. Senate
Preceded by Theodore F. Randolph	U.S. senator (Class 1) from New Jersey; 1881–1887; Served alongside: John R. McPherson	Succeeded by Rufus Blodgett
Preceded by John R. McPherson	U.S. senator (Class 2) from New Jersey; 1895–1901; Served alongside: James Smith, Jr., John Kean	Succeeded by John F. Dryden
Political offices
Preceded by John W. Taylor	President of the New Jersey Senate; 1876	Succeeded by Leon Abbett
Preceded by George C. Ludlow	President of the New Jersey Senate; 1879–1880	Succeeded by Garret Hobart
