= 1844 New Jersey Constitution =

Former state constitution

New Jersey State Flag

The 1844 New Jersey Constitution is the second state constitution for the State of New Jersey, being adopted on June 29, 1844. It was replaced by the current state constitution adopted in 1947. It was preceded by the 1776 New Jersey Constitution.
