= James Parker =

James, Jim, and Jimmy Parker may refer to:

== Arts and entertainment ==
- James Cutler Dunn Parker (1828–1916), American musician
- James Ervan Parker (born 1942), American singer-songwriter
- James Stewart Parker (1941–1988), English playwright and writer
- Jim Parker (composer) (1934–2023), British composer

== Military ==
- James Parker (Medal of Honor) (1854–1934), United States Army major general
- James P. Parker (1855–1942), United States Navy commodore

== Politics ==
- James Parker (judge) (1803–1852), British vice-chancellor, father of the rower James Parker
- James Parker (British politician) (1863–1948), British Labour politician, Member of Parliament for Halifax
- Lieutenant General James Parker (1929-2020), Chief of Staff of the Irish Defence Forces 1989-1992
- James Parker (Massachusetts politician) (1768–1837), United States congressman from Massachusetts
- James Parker (New Jersey politician) (1776–1868), United States congressman from New Jersey
- James Aubrey Parker (1937–2022), U.S. federal judge
- James S. Parker (1867–1933), United States congressman from New York
- James Augustus Parker (1820–1899), member of the Queensland Legislative Assembly

== Religion ==
- James Parker (cement maker) (fl. 1791–1797), British clergyman and cement maker, the inventor of "Roman" cement
- James Parker (priest) (1930–2016), American priest of the Anglican and later Roman Catholic Church

== Sports ==
- James Parker (hammer thrower) (1975–2023), American hammer thrower
- James Parker (handballer) (born 1994), Argentine handballer
- James Parker (rower) (fl. 1842–1863), English rower, son of the judge James Parker
- James Parker (rugby league) (fl. 1912–1919), New Zealand rugby league player
- James Parker (rugby union), New Zealand rugby union player; see List of New Zealand national rugby union players
- James Parker (tennis), American tennis player of the 1960s; see 1965 Wimbledon Championships – Men's Singles
- James "Quick" Parker (1958–2018), Canadian Football League player
- Jim Parker (American football) (1934–2005), American professional football player
- Jim Parker (footballer) (fl. 1905–1913), English footballer
- Red Parker (Jimmy Parker, 1931–2016), college football coach
- Jamie Parker (cricketer) (born 1980), English cricketer

== Others ==
- James Parker (art historian) (1924–2001), curator of European Sculpture and Decorative Arts at the Metropolitan Museum of Art
- James Parker (publisher) (1714–1770), colonial American printer and publisher
- James A. Parker (foreign service officer) (1922–1994), African-American foreign service officer
- James Alexander Parker (1864-1946) Chief Engineer of the Great North of Scotland Railway
- James Benjamin Parker (1857–1907), American noted for attempting to stop the assassination of president William McKinley
- James Gordon Parker (1952–2026), British registrar for the Public Lending Right
- James Vanderburgh Parker (1830–1917), American heir and social leader
- James W. Parker (1797–1864), Texas settler
- James Wentworth Parker (1886–1957), American mechanical engineer
- Jim Parker (rugby union) (1897–1980), New Zealand soldier, sportsman and businessman

== See also ==
- Jamie Parker (born 1979), English actor and singer
- Jamie Parker (politician) (born 1971), Australian Greens politician
