= St. Mary's Episcopal Church (Portsmouth, Rhode Island) =

Historic Episcopal church in Rhode Island, United States

- U.S. National Register of Historic Places
- Location: 324 East Main Road, Portsmouth, Rhode Island
- Coordinates: 41.5472°N 71.2611°W
- Built: 1849
- Architect: Richard Upjohn
- Architectural style: Gothic Revival
- Website: smcportsmouth.org
- NRHP reference No.: 100008600
- Added to NRHP: March 24, 2023

St. Mary's Episcopal Church is a historic Episcopal church on East Main Road in Portsmouth, Rhode Island, United States. Since 2023, St. Mary's Church has been listed on the National Register of Historic Places. The churchyard includes a cemetery with more than 2,000 interments.

== History ==
Saint Mary's Church was opened to the public on June 17, 1849. The church was designed by architect Richard Upjohn in the Gothic Revival style and is made from local fieldstones with brownstone trim.

Saint Mary's Church was established through the philanthropy of Sarah Gibbs, who was the owner of nearby Oakland Farm. She was the sister of Ruth Gibbs Channing who was the wife of Unitarian minister and theologian William Ellery Channing.

== Notable burials ==
- Hon. Clark Burdick - Congressman
- Brevet Major General Alfred Gibbs - Civil War general
- Rear Admiral Stephen Luce - Founder of the Naval War College
- Major General James Parker - Medal of Honor recipient
- James Parker - Art historian
- Major General Cortlandt Parker - World War II general
- Robert Means Thompson - Naval officer, lawyer, mining executive and Olympic supporter
- Harold Stirling Vanderbilt, CBE - Railroad executive and yachtsman
- Sunny von Bülow - Socialite
- Edwin Sheldon Whitehouse - Diplomat
- Charles S. Whitehouse - War hero and diplomat
- Robert R. Young - Businessman
