= Cortlandt Parker =

United States Army major general (1884–1960)

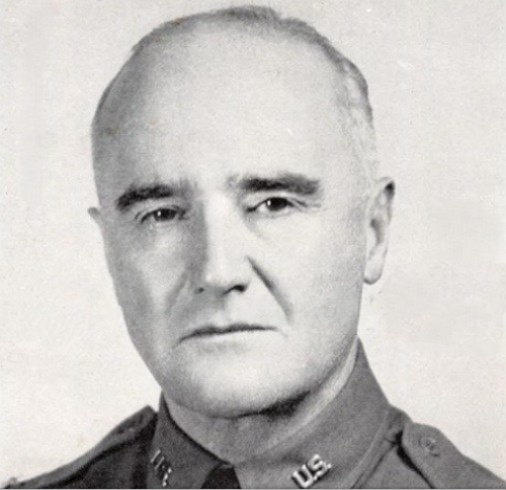
- Parker as commander of the 5th Infantry Division in 1941
- Born: 10 December 1884; Fort Apache, Arizona Territory, US
- Died: 18 January 1960 (aged 75); Boston, Massachusetts, US
- Burial place: St. Mary's Episcopal Churchyard, Portsmouth, Rhode Island, US
- Education: United States Military Academy; United States Army Command and General Staff College; United States Army War College
- Spouse: Elizabeth Gray (m. 1918–1960)
- Children: 2 (including James Parker (1924–2001)
- Relatives: James Parker (1854–1934) (father); Richard W. Parker (uncle); Charles Wolcott Parker (uncle); Cortlandt Parker (1818–1907) (grandfather); James Parker (1776–1868) (great-grandfather)
- Military career
- Service: United States Army
- Service years: 1906–1946
- Rank: Major General
- Service number: O2146
- Units: US Army Cavalry Branch; US Army Field Artillery Branch
- Commands: US Artillery School, Coëtquidan; 57th Field Artillery Regiment; 6th Field Artillery Regiment; 14th Field Artillery Regiment; 1st Battalion, 16th Field Artillery Regiment; US Military Attaché, Great Britain and Ireland; 7th Field Artillery Regiment; Fort Ethan Allen; 6th Civilian Conservation Corps District; 8th Field Artillery Regiment; Army Troops and Exhibits, 1939 New York World's Fair; 19th Field Artillery Regiment; 5th Infantry Division Artillery; 5th Infantry Division; Western Defense Area; California Sector, Western Defense Command
- Wars: World War I Mexican Border War; World War II
- Awards: Army Distinguished Service Medal; Silver Star; Legion of Merit; Complete list

Signature
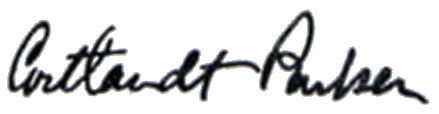

Cortlandt Parker (10 December 1884 – 18 January 1960) was a career officer in the United States Army. A graduate of the United States Military Academy, he served from 1906 until 1946 and attained the rank of major general. Parker was a veteran of World War I and World War II, and his awards and decorations included the Army Distinguished Service Medal, Silver Star, and Legion of Merit.

A native of Fort Apache, Arizona Territory and the son of a career army officer, Parker was raised at army bases throughout the United States and graduated from high school in Newark, New Jersey. He then attended the United States Military Academy (West Point), from which he graduated in 1906. Commissioned a second lieutenant of Cavalry, he later transferred to the Field Artillery, and he served with Artillery units in the United States and the Philippines, including service in Texas during the Mexican Border War. During World War I, he commanded Field Artillery regiments in France and the United States.

After the First World War, Parker graduated from the United States Army Command and General Staff College and the United States Army War College, and continued to command Field Artillery units. During World War II he commanded the 5th Infantry Division Artillery and the 5th Infantry Division during their organization and training, then went on to command the Western Defense Area and the California Sector of the Western Defense Command. He retired in 1960 and lived in Boston while maintaining a summer home in Portsmouth, Rhode Island. He died in Boston on 18 January 1960 and was buried at St. Mary's Episcopal Churchyard in Portsmouth.

== Early life ==
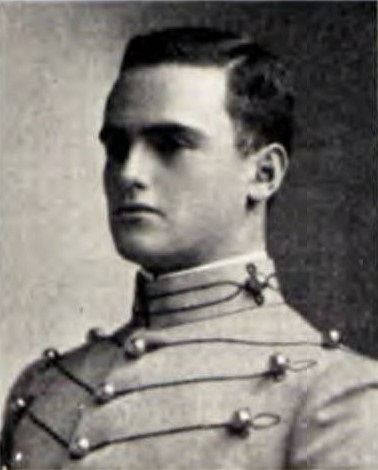
Parker as a West Point Cadet in 1906

Cortlandt Parker was born at Fort Apache, Arizona Territory on 10 December 1884, a son of James Parker (1854–1934) and Charlotte Matilda (Condit) Parker. Parker was from a family long prominent in military and government; his father attained the rank of major general and was a recipient of the Medal of Honor. His uncle Richard W. Parker served as a member of the United States House of Representatives. Another uncle, Charles Wolcott Parker, was a judge who presided over the Hall–Mills murder case trial and authored the opinion affirming the conviction of Bruno Richard Hauptmann for the Lindbergh kidnapping and murder.

Parker's grandfather Cortlandt Parker (1818–1907) was a prominent attorney who served as president of the American Bar Association. Parker was also a descendant of colonial newspaper publisher James Parker (1714–1770) and Cortlandt Skinner, a Loyalist leader during the American Revolution. He was also a member of the Society of the Cincinnati by right of descent from Continental Army Captain Richard Stites (1747–1776).

Due to his father's military career, Parker was raised and educated at army posts throughout the United States. As a teenager, he lived with his grandparents in New Jersey so he could attend Newark Academy, from which he graduated in 1902. He intended to enroll at Princeton University, but his plans changed when he was offered an at-large appointment to the United States Military Academy at West Point, which he accepted. Parker graduated in 1906 ranked 46th of 78; among his classmates who also became general officers were Jonathan M. Wainwright, Adna R. Chaffee Jr., Frank Maxwell Andrews, and Edmund L. Daley.

== Start of career ==
After his West Point graduation, Parker was commissioned as a second lieutenant of Cavalry. Assigned to the 5th Cavalry Regiment, he served at Fort Apache, Arizona Territory, from September 1906 to August 1907. In July 1907, he transferred from Cavalry to Field Artillery; he was promoted to first lieutenant in the 6th Field Artillery Regiment and posted to Fort Riley, Kansas. He served at Fort Riley until 1913, when he was transferred to the 2nd Field Artillery Regiment and assigned to duty in the Philippines. He served at Fort Stotsenburg from August 1913 until October 1915, when he was transferred to the 4th Field Artillery Regiment and returned to the United States.

Parker served with the 4th Artillery at Fort Bliss, Texas until March 1916, when he was posted first to Boston, and later to New Haven, Connecticut, where he was an instructor and inspector of National Guard units until June 1916. From June 1916 to February 1917, he was assigned to Mexican Border War duty in Brownsville, Texas as aide-de-camp to his father during his father's command of the Department of Texas. Parker was promoted to captain in July 1916. In June and July 1917, he was assigned to duty with the 6th Field Artillery at Camp Harry J. Jones in Douglas, Arizona.

== Continued career ==
In April 1917, the United States entered World War I, and in July Parker sailed for France. From August to October, he attended a Field Artillery course at French military school in Valdahon. From October 1917 to February 1918, he was director of the US Artillery School at Coëtquidan. From February to March 1918, he was acting adjutant of the 1st Field Artillery Brigade. In March and April, he served on the staff of the American Expeditionary Forces inspector of artillery. From April to August, he was adjutant of the 1st Field Artillery Brigade, including combat during the Battle of Cantigny. From April to August, Parker commanded the 6th Field Artillery Regiment, including combat during the Aisne-Marne Offensive. In September 1918, he returned to the United States to assume command of the 57th Field Artillery regiment during its organization and training at Camp Bowie near Fort Worth, Texas. He later commanded the 14th Field Artillery Regiment at Fort Sill, Oklahoma and served on the faculty of the Field Artillery School, where he remained after the end of the war in November 1918. Parker served at Fort Sill until November 1920.

=== Family ===
In November 1918, Parker married Elizabeth Gray of Boston. They were married until his death and were the parents of two sons. Cortlandt Parker (1921–2002) was a World War II veteran who became the owner and publisher of a chain of newspapers in New Jersey. James Parker (1924–2001) was a veteran of the Second World War and a noted art historian.

== Later career ==
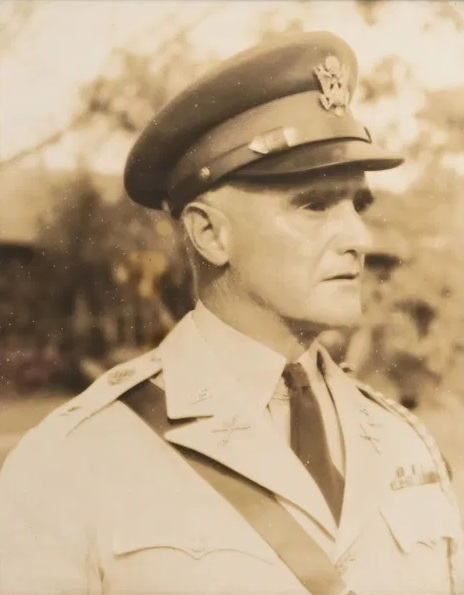
Parker as a colonel commanding the 8th Field Artillery in 1937

Parker commanded the 6th Field Artillery at Fort Dix, New Jersey from January to August 1921. He was then assigned to Fort Leavenworth, where he was a student at the School of the Line until 1922. Parker took the course at the United States Army Command and General Staff College from 1922 to 1923. He was next assigned to Washington Barracks, where he was a student at the United States Army Command and General Staff College, from which he graduated in 1924. He served on the staff at the United States Department of War From July 1924 to June 1928, when he was assigned to command 1st Battalion, 16th Field Artillery Regiment at Fort Myer, Virginia. In September 1930, Parker was assigned to the staff of the 78th Division, a unit of the Organized Reserve Corps headquartered in Newark, New Jersey. In July 1931, Parker was assigned as US military attaché to Great Britain and Ireland.

From August 1935 to August 1936, Parker was assigned to the 7th Field Artillery Regiment at Fort Ethan Allen, Vermont, first as regimental executive officer, then as commander of the regiment and the post, as well as commander of the 6th Civilian Conservation Corps District. From August 1936 to July 1938, he commanded the 8th Field Artillery Regiment at Schofield Barracks, Hawaii Territory. From September 1938 to November 1939, Parker was commander of the army troops and exhibits at the 1939 New York World's Fair. He was then assigned to command the 19th Field Artillery Regiment, first at Fort Knox, Kentucky, and later at Fort McClellan, Alabama.

With the army expanding in anticipation of American entry into World War II, in July 1940 Parker was assigned to command the 5th Infantry Division Artillery at Fort Custer, Michigan and he was promoted to brigadier general in October. In August 1941, he was assigned to command the 5th Infantry Division, first at Fort Custer, and later in Iceland. He was promoted to major general in August 1942 and assigned to command the Western Defense Area (WDA) on the Pacific Coast of the United States. The WDA was later organized as the Western Defense Command, and Parker commanded its California sector beginning in November 1945. In August 1946, Parker retired for disability, leaving the army about four months before he would have reached the mandatory retirement age of 64.

In retirement, Parker was a resident of Boston and maintained a summer home in Portsmouth, Rhode Island. Among his civic activities were service as vice president and a member of the board of directors for Boston's Armed Forces Club, member of the hospital budget committee for Boston's United Community Service, and volunteer for Boston's Department of Civil Service.

He died in Boston on 18 January 1960. He is buried with his father and other family members in Saint Mary's Episcopal Churchyard in Portsmouth.

== Awards ==
Parker's awards included the Army Distinguished Service Medal, Silver Star, Legion of Merit and French Legion of Honor (Officer). As a result of his First World War service, Parker was entitled to wear the French fourragère. In 1939, Parker received the New Jersey Distinguished Service Medal from Governor A. Harry Moore in recognition of his accomplishments during the World's Fair. In 1946, the government of Mexico awarded Parker the Medal of Military Merit (First Class) to commend his cooperation with Mexico's military on wartime defense of the Pacific coast.

Parker's service medals included the Mexican Border Service Medal, World War I Victory Medal with three battle clasps, and American Defense Service Medal. In addition, he was a recipient of the European–African–Middle Eastern Campaign Medal, American Campaign Medal, and World War II Victory Medal.

=== Distinguished Service Medal citation ===
"The President of the United States of America, authorized by Act of Congress, July 9, 1918, takes pleasure in presenting the Army Distinguished Service Medal to Colonel (Field Artillery) Cortlandt Parker, United States Army, for exceptionally meritorious and distinguished services to the Government of the United States, in a duty of great responsibility during World War I. Colonel Parker organized and conducted the training camp for Field Artillery at Camp Coetquidan and later, at the Office of the Chief of Artillery, American Expeditionary Forces. By his superior professional attainments, his zeal, and keen foresight, he contributed in a marked manner to the successful conduct of Field Artillery training. As Regimental Commander of the 6th Field Artillery, 1st Division, in the Cantigny sector and in the Aisne-Marne offensive, he repeatedly displayed superior tactical judgment and knowledge of artillery, and by his exceptional ability, leadership, and devotion to duty he rendered the maximum support to the Infantry of the 1st Division in effectively executing the most difficult missions assigned to him, thus rendering in a position of great responsibility most important services to the American Expeditionary Forces."

Service: Army Rank: Colonel Division: 1st Division, American Expeditionary Forces General Orders: War Department, General Orders No. 49 (1922)

=== Silver Star citation ===
"This is to certify that the President of the United States of America authorized by Act of Congress, July 9, 1918, has awarded a Silver Star to Colonel Cortlandt Parker for gallantry in action as Commanding Officer, 6th Field Artillery Regiment, 1st Division, American Expeditionary Forces southwest of Soissons, 18–25 July 1918. The gallant actions and dedicated devotion to duty demonstrated by Colonel Parker, without regard for his own life, were in keeping with the highest traditions of military service and reflect great credit upon himself and the United States Army."

Service: United States Army Rank: Colonel (Field Artillery) Regiment: 6th Field Artillery Regiment Division: 1st Division, American Expeditionary Forces Action Date: World War I Orders: Headquarters, 1st Division, A.E.F., Citation Orders No. 41 (1918)

== Dates of rank ==
Parker's dates of rank were:

- Second Lieutenant, 12 June 1906
- First Lieutenant, 8 July 1907
- Captain, 1 July 1916
- Major (National Army), 5 August 1917
- Lieutenant Colonel, (National Army), 24 January 1918
- Colonel (National Army), 28 August 1918
- Captain, 13 February 1920
- Major, 21 May 1920
- Lieutenant Colonel, 14 January 1930
- Colonel, 1 August 1935
- Brigadier General (Army of the United States), 1 October 1940
- Major General (Army of the United States), 2 August 1942
- Major General (Retired), 31 August 1946
