= Daniel F. Minahan =

American politician

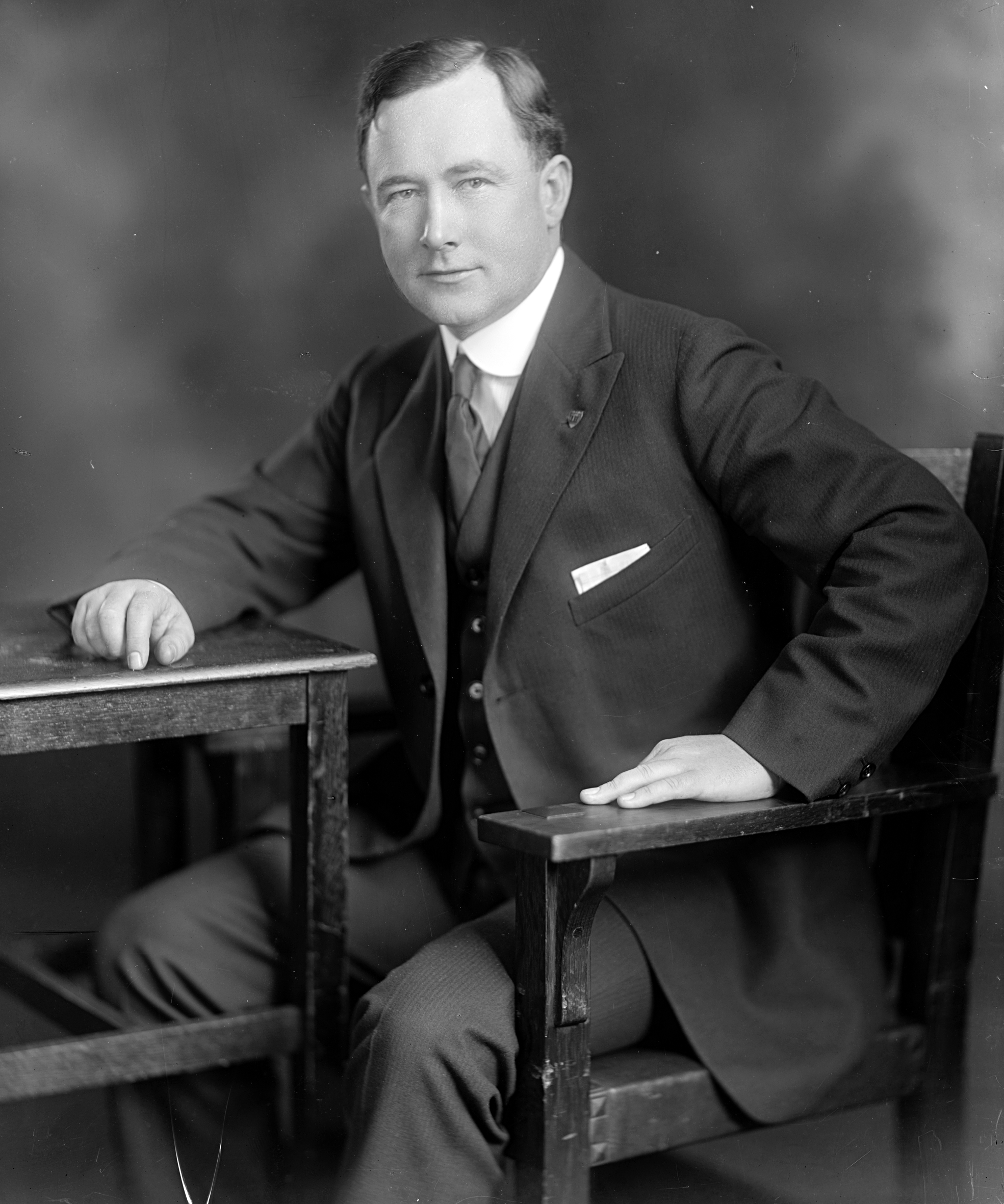

Member of the U.S. House of Representatives from New Jersey's 9th district
- In office March 4, 1919 – March 3, 1921
- Preceded by: Richard W. Parker
- Succeeded by: Richard W. Parker
- In office March 4, 1923 – March 3, 1925
- Preceded by: Richard W. Parker
- Succeeded by: Franklin William Fort

Personal details
- Born: August 8, 1877 Springfield, Ohio, US
- Died: April 29, 1947 (aged 69) East Orange, New Jersey, US
- Party: Democratic

Daniel Francis Minahan (August 8, 1877, Springfield, Ohio – April 29, 1947) was an American Democratic Party politician from New Jersey who represented the 6th congressional district from 1919 to 1921 and again from 1923 to 1925.

== Biography ==
Minahan was born in Springfield, Ohio on August 8, 1877. He attended Stevens Institute Preparatory School and Seton Hall College in South Orange, New Jersey. He was superintendent of work for his father, who was a contractor. He served as Mayor of Orange, New Jersey from May 1914 until August 1919, when he resigned.

Minahan was elected as a Democrat to the Sixty-sixth Congress, serving in office from March 4, 1919 to March 3, 1921, but was an unsuccessful candidate for reelection in 1920 to the Sixty-seventh Congress. He was again elected to the Sixty-eighth Congress, serving from March 4, 1923 to March 3, 1925. He was unsuccessful candidate for reelection in 1924 to the Sixty-ninth Congress and for election in 1930 to the Seventy-second Congress.

He was a delegate to the 1928 Democratic National Convention. He engaged in land development and resided in East Orange, New Jersey, until his death on April 29, 1947. He was interred in St. Johns Catholic Cemetery, in Orange, New Jersey.

U.S. House of Representatives
Preceded by Richard W. Parker	Member of the U.S. House of Representatives from New Jersey's 9th congressional district March 4, 1919 – March 3, 1921	Succeeded by Richard W. Parker
Preceded by Richard W. Parker	Member of the U.S. House of Representatives from New Jersey's 9th congressional district March 4, 1923 – March 3, 1925	Succeeded by Franklin W. Fort
