= Denise J. Jamieson =

American gynecologist

- Born: New Jersey, USA

Academic background
- Education: BA, University of Pennsylvania; MPH, University of North Carolina at Chapel Hill; MD, Duke University School of Medicine

Denise J. Jamieson (born c. 1965) is an American gynecologist. She is the University of Iowa Vice President for Medical Affairs and the Tyrone D. Artz Dean of the Roy J. and Lucille A. Carver College of Medicine. She is a former medical officer in the United States Public Health Service.

== Early life and education ==
Jamieson was raised in Livingston, New Jersey, where she graduated from Newark Academy in 1983. She earned her Bachelor of Arts degree from the University of Pennsylvania, her Master's in Public Health from the University of North Carolina at Chapel Hill, and her Medical degree from Duke University School of Medicine.

== Career ==
Upon completing her medical degree, Jamieson became a medical officer in the United States Public Health Service. In 2007, she received a Commissioned Corps Outstanding Service Medal for "outstanding leadership and national and international contributions to women’s health."

Jamieson also joined the Centers for Disease Control and Prevention, where she led a task force to combat the Ebola virus and Zika virus. She also served as an Epidemic Intelligence Service Officer before retiring from the United States Public Health Service in 2017. After spending 20 years with the Centers for Disease Control and Prevention, Jamieson joined the faculty at Emory University as the James Robert McCord Chair in Gynecology and Obstetrics. Later, she was elected a Member of the National Academy of Medicine. In August 2023, Dr. Jamieson became the vice president for medical affairs and dean of the Carver College of Medicine at the University of Iowa.
