= St. Johns Catholic Cemetery, Orange =

Cemetery in Essex County, New Jersey

Coordinates: 40.7778°N 74.2315°W

- Interactive map of St. Johns Catholic Cemetery, Orange

Details
- Location: Orange, New Jersey
- Type: Catholic cemetery

St. Johns Catholic Cemetery is a cemetery in Orange in the U.S. state of New Jersey.

== Notable burials ==
- Tony Galento (1910–1979), heavyweight boxer, nicknamed "Two Ton Tony".
- Daniel F. Minahan (1877–1947), represented New Jersey's 6th congressional district from 1919 to 1921 and again from 1923 to 1925.
