= Lyndsey Scott =

American model and iOS mobile app software developer

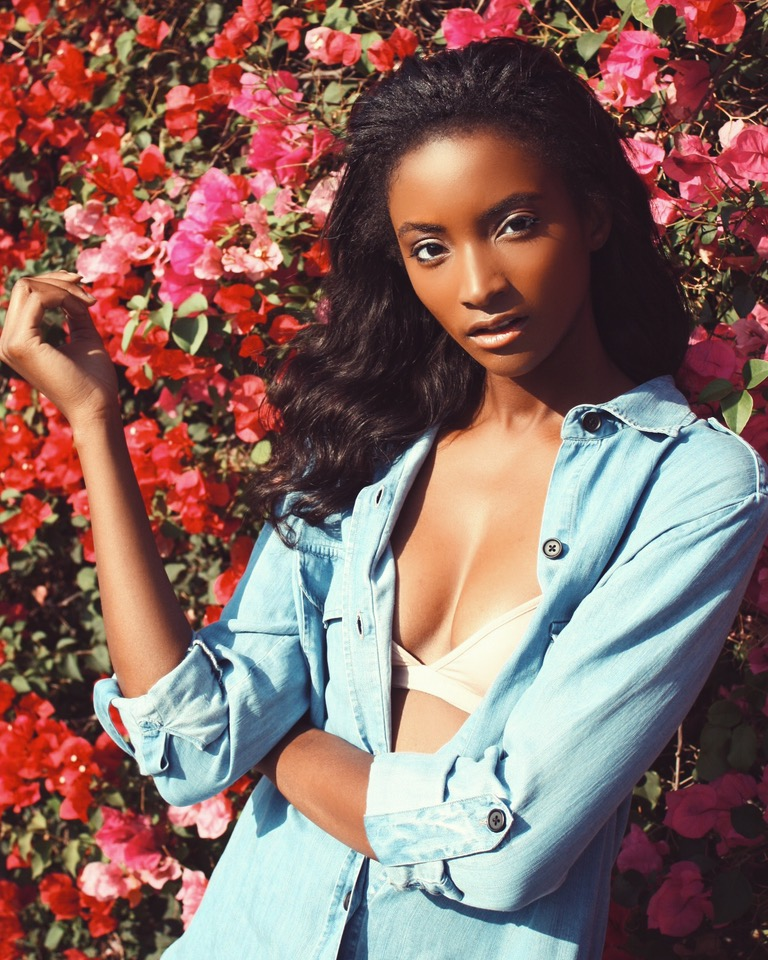
- Scott in 2016, photographed by Lucas Traian.
- Born: December 7, 1984 (age 41)
- Occupations: Model, software developer
- Years active: 2008–present
- Modeling information
- Height: 1.75 m (5 ft 9 in)
- Hair color: Dark brown
- Eye color: Dark brown
- Website: http://www.lyndseyscott.com/

Lyndsey Scott is an American model and iOS mobile app software developer. She was the first African American to sign an exclusive runway contract with Calvin Klein, and has worked for Gucci, Prada, and Victoria's Secret.

Besides modeling, Scott writes mobile apps for iOS devices, and mentors young women in computer programming. She has been credited for challenging the stereotypes about models and computer programmers.

== Early life ==
Lyndsey Scott was born in 1984, and grew up in West Orange, New Jersey, as the eldest of four children. Her father founded a home healthcare company after having been a programmer for the National Security Agency. She practiced martial arts beginning at age nine, and earned a black belt in Taekwondo.

Scott was bullied as a teenager. She reported she was the only Black person for three years at Newark Academy, the New Jersey preparatory high school she attended, and so thin – 5 feet 8 inches (1.73 m) and 80 pounds (36 kg) – that she was called a "monster". She states peers would invite then uninvite her from parties, and tell her she couldn't sit with them in the dining room. "It got so bad in high school I couldn't even look people in the face. I would hide out in school so I wouldn't have to eat lunch in the cafeteria or see people in between classes."

Scott studied theatre, economics, and physics at Amherst College, before taking computer science. She ran and did high jump for the Amherst track and field team, earning All-America status for the 400 meter dash. In 2006, she graduated from undergrad with a joint degree in theatre and computer science.

== Modeling ==
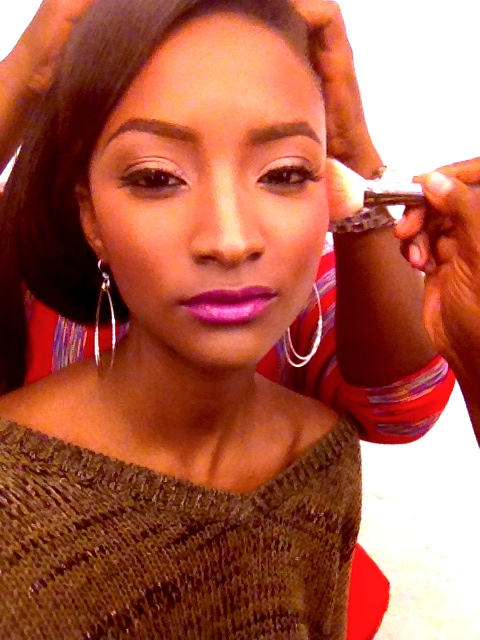
Scott being made up

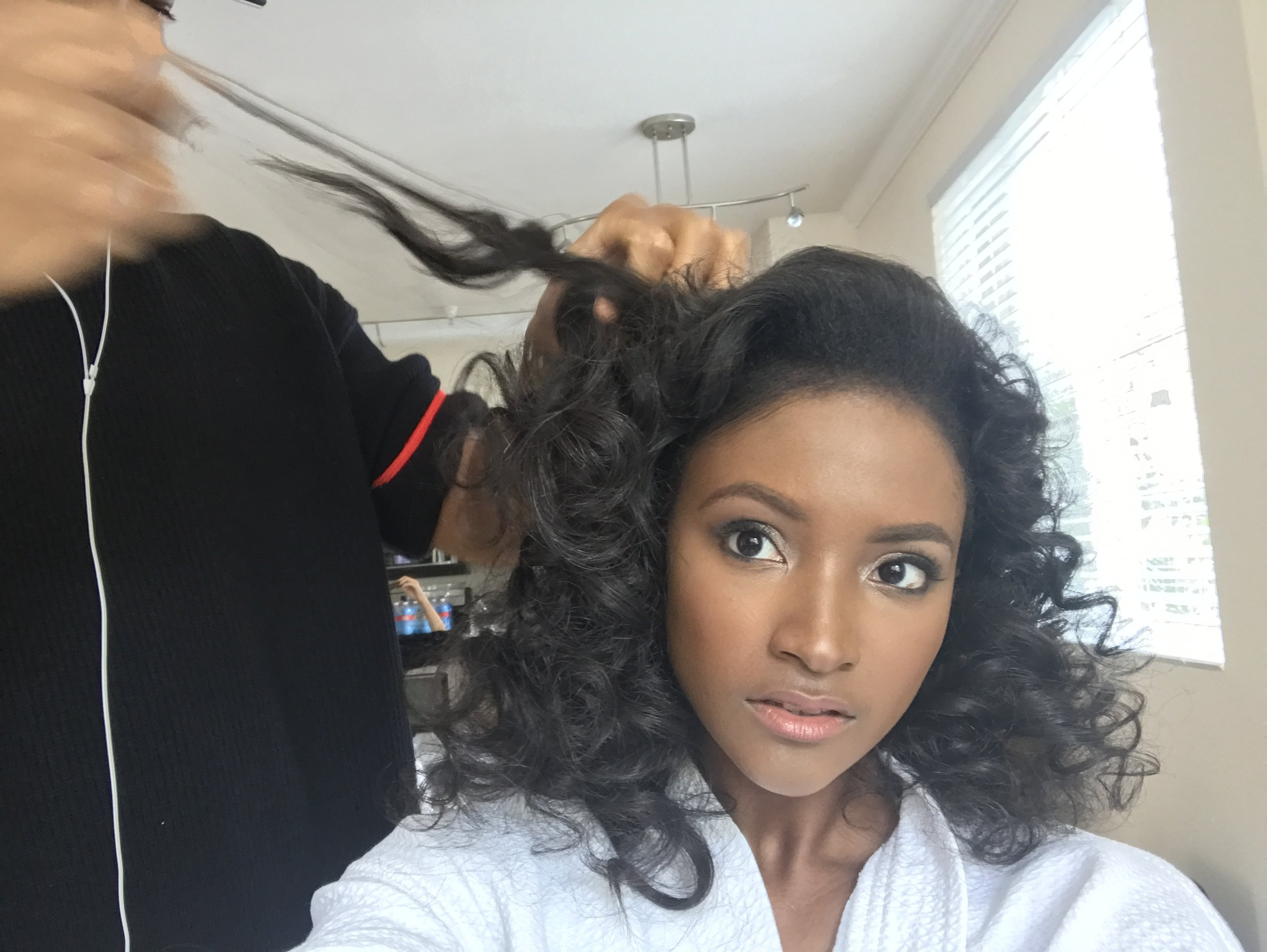
Scott with her hair being combed

After college, Scott was more interested in acting than computer science, and began pursuing auditions in New York City. Her body had changed in college, partly due to taking weight-gain supplements, and she says she "started looking more like a model". She applied for modeling work with the encouragement of friends, but, for two years, was always rejected. Her parents urged her to take computer science jobs.

However, Scott had posted her picture on the website Models.com, and in 2008, she was contacted by Click Model Management of New York City. Elle Girl featured her in a video including her Click new model training. At the time, she was 24, which was considered old for a model. The agency asked her to lie about her age, and for her first few years modeling, she claimed to have been born in 1990.

Even with an agency contract, Scott wasn't immediately successful. In early 2009 Scott's work was handing out flyers on a street corner when she got a call from fashion house Calvin Klein. That February, during New York Fashion Week (NYFW), she became the first Black model to sign an exclusive runway contract with Calvin Klein. Bethann Hardison said that no model in recent history had made such an impact.

Other prestigious modeling jobs followed: in her first years as a model, she modeled for Vera Wang, DKNY, Baby Phat, Fendi, Gucci, Louis Vuitton, and the 2009 Victoria's Secret Fashion Show, and appeared in the magazines Italian Elle, Teen Vogue, and W. Style.com listed her as a top 10 newcomer. In the 2010 fall NYFW, she was the only black model walking runways for Prada. She also changed agencies to Elite Model Management, which was more accepting of her actual age.

In 2013, Scott's programming skills drew attention from various media outlets. She was covered as the model with a secret identity as a coder. Publications credited her with disproving the stereotypes that fashion models had no brains. Fashion magazine Harper's Bazaar asked her to report on the Apple Worldwide Developers Conference.

== Computer programming ==
Scott started programming at the age of 12, by writing games for her TI-89 graphing calculator and sharing them with friends in middle school. She learned Java and C++ programming languages and MIPS architecture at Amherst College, and taught herself skills she used for writing applications in Python and Objective C on the iOS platform.

Scott has dedicated herself to educating young women on how to program. She maintains a profile on Stack Overflow, a website where users gain reputation for providing answers about computer programming. In early 2014, she was one of the top 2% of users with over 2.000 reputation points and more than 38.000 profile views. She was the top ranked user for iOS questions on the site for one month in 2015. As of February 2022, she has over 36,000 reputation points with over 400 answers to user questions and is in the top 1% of users on the platform.

She was a representative for Code.org's second Hour of Code learning initiative, made a video teaching programming with Disney's Frozen characters, and is a mentor at Girls Who Code, an organization teaching programming to teenage girls. She has given talks on programming at schools in Harlem and NYU, and mentored Girl Scouts in programming in Los Angeles.

Her combination of modeling and coding is seen as inspirational to young women. She was a keynote speaker for the Harvard Undergraduate Women in Business in 2014, and a presenter for the Ford Freedom Awards in 2015.

=== Applications ===
Scott's earliest iOS mobile apps were written on her own, for Standable, Inc., the company she founded in 2011. Scott's first published app was Educate! in support of a non-profit also called Educate!, supporting young Ugandan scholars, and founded by two Amherst students. Her second was iPort, intended to help models organize their career portfolio digitally. Scott says she developed iPort because it was a tool she personally needed, as her paper portfolio books were heavy and falling apart. Code Made Cool, released in conjunction with Scott's 2014 appearance on the cover of Asos magazine, was an iPhone app that taught girls programming via drag and drop in fantasy scenarios with animated pictures of Ryan Gosling.

Lyndsey currently works as the lead iOS software engineer at NGO fundraiser Rallybound, where she builds iOS fundraising apps for various non-profit organizations.

In 2022, she announced the launch of the Lynsey Scott Coding+ Scholarship, which is geared towards LGBTQIA+, women, and/or BIPOC students who are majoring in computer science.

== Personal life ==
In 2016, Scott was sued by a man who leased her Roosevelt Island apartment through Airbnb, who claimed the apartment was dilapidated and the area unsafe; Scott said the posted photos, descriptions and reviews were verifiable and accurate. The case was dismissed.
