= Cortlandt Parker (attorney) =

American attorney (1818–1907)

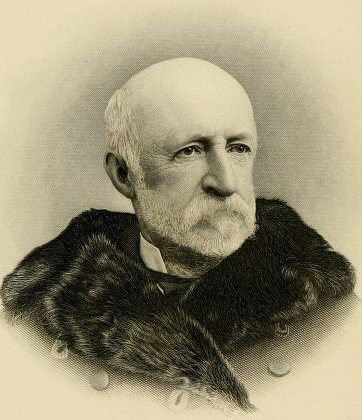
- Parker in 1900

President of the American Bar Association
- In office 1883–1884
- Preceded by: Alexander Lawton
- Succeeded by: John W. Stevenson

Prosecutor of the Pleas for Essex County, New Jersey
- In office 1857–1867
- Preceded by: Jacob Van Arsdale
- Succeeded by: Caleb S. Titsworth

Personal details
- Born: 27 June 1818 Perth Amboy, New Jersey, US
- Died: 29 July 1907 (aged 89) Newark, New Jersey, US
- Resting place: Mount Pleasant Cemetery, Newark, New Jersey, US
- Party: Republican
- Other political affiliations: Whig
- Spouse: Elizabeth Wolcott Stites (m. 1847–1907)
- Relations: James Parker (father); Cortlandt Parker (grandson); James Parker (great-grandson)
- Children: 9 (including James Parker, Richard W. Parker, Charles Wolcott Parker)
- Education: Rutgers College
- Profession: Attorney

Cortlandt Parker (27 June 1818 – 29 July 1907) was an American attorney from Newark, New Jersey. As 1836 graduate of Rutgers College, he studied law, attained admission to the bar in 1839, and practiced in Newark. Parker specialized in corporation law and was a leader of New Jersey's legal community; in addition to serving as president of the American Bar Association, he held prominent positions in the Newark, Essex County, and New Jersey bar associations.

== Early life ==
Cortlandt Parker was born in Perth Amboy, New Jersey on 27 June 1818. His father, James Parker, served in the United States House of Representatives and as mayor of Perth Amboy. His mother, Penelope Coats Butler, died when Parker was five years old; his father remarried in 1827, and Parker was raised by his stepmother, Catherine Morris Ogden. Parker grew up and was educated in Perth Amboy. At age 14, he attained admission to Rutgers College. He graduated with a Bachelor of Arts degree in 1836, was ranked first in his class, and was selected as the valedictorian. Among his classmates were Joseph P. Bradley, Frederick T. Frelinghuysen, William A. Newell, and Henry Waldron.

After his college graduation, Parker read law with Theodore Frelinghuysen. When Frelinghuysen left his legal practice to become president of New York University, Parker continued his legal studies in the office of Amzi Armstrong. He attained admission to the bar in 1839. Also in 1839, he received his Master of Arts degree from Rutgers. He then began to practice in Newark as the partner of Bradley and Frederick Frelinghuysen. He also became active in politics as a Whig. Parker was a proponent of the party's principles including a strong federal government, internal improvements, protective tariffs, and abolition, and he frequently gave campaign speeches on behalf of Whig candidates.

== Continued career ==
In 1847, Parker married Elizabeth Wolcott Stites. They were married until her death and were the parents of nine children. Among their sons were Major General James Parker, U.S. Representative Richard W. Parker, and Judge Charles Wolcott Parker. Among their grandchildren was Major General Cortlandt Parker (1884–1960), and among their great-grandchildren was art historian James Parker (1924–2001).

When the Republican Party was founded in the mid-1850s as the main anti-slavery party, Parker became an early adherent. In 1857, he was appointed Prosecutor of the Pleas for Essex County, New Jersey, and he served until 1867. In 1866, Parker received two honorary degrees, an LL.D. from Rutgers College and an LL.D. from Princeton University. He supported the Union during the American Civil War. After the war, he played a key role in persuading New Jersey to ratify the Fourteenth Amendment to the United States Constitution, which defined U.S. citizenship and provided for equal protection under federal law. Though he campaigned for other candidates, he turned down many opportunities to serve in elective and appointed office, including Attorney General of New Jersey, associate justice of the New Jersey Supreme Court, chancellor of the New Jersey Court of Chancery, member of the tribunal that settled the Alabama Claims, minister to Russia, and minister Austria-Hungary.

Parker was a member of Newark's Trinity Episcopal Church for over five decades and served as a vestryman, Sunday school superintendent, and warden. He was an accomplished orator on historical, political, and religious topics, and many of his speeches were reprinted as books or pamphlets. A partial list of Parker's speeches and written works includes:

- Life of Frelinghuysen (1844)
- The Moral Guilt of the Rebellion (1862)
- Philip Kearny, Soldier and Patriot (1863)
- Our Triumphs and Our Duties (1865)
- New Jersey; Her Present and Future (1870)
- Abraham Lincoln (1872)
- The Open Bible or Tolerance and Christianity (1873)
- Alexander Hamilton and William Paterson (1880)
- The Three Successful Generals of the Army of the Potomac: McClellan, Meade and Grant (1893)
- Justice Joseph P. Bradley (1893)
- Sir Matthew Hale: The Lawyer's Best Exemplar (1896)

== Later career ==
In 1871, Parker was one of three commissioners appointed to revise New Jersey's statutes. In 1873, he served on the commission that settled the boundary between Delaware and New Jersey. He was active in promoting ethical standard and professional development in the legal profession, and held leadership roles in the Newark, Essex County, and New Jersey bar associations. He was also active in the American Bar Association and served as its president from 1883 to 1884.

As a senior member of the New Jersey bar, his law partners included his son Richard W. Parker and Anthony Quinton Keasbey. He continued to reside in Newark while also maintaining a summer home in Perth Amboy. He continued to practice law nearly until his death; in 1906, he argued a successful appeal before the Court of Chancery. Later that year, he argued before the state legislature in favor of a bill that allowed continued use of the Morris Canal for commercial purposes. Parker died in Newark on 29 July 1907. He was buried at Mount Pleasant Cemetery in Newark.
