= Allan Benny =

American politician

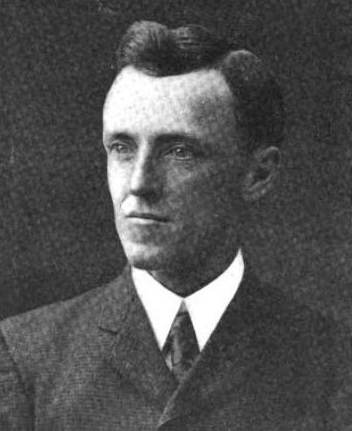
- From the front cover of September 1904's The Postal Record magazine

Member of the U.S. House of Representatives from New Jersey's 9th district
- In office March 4, 1903 – March 3, 1905
- Preceded by: District created
- Succeeded by: Marshall Van Winkle

Personal details
- Born: July 12, 1867 Brooklyn, New York, U.S.
- Died: November 6, 1942 (aged 75) Bayonne, New Jersey, U.S.
- Party: Democratic

Allan Benny (July 12, 1867 – November 6, 1942) was an American Democratic Party politician from New Jersey who represented the 9th congressional district for one term from 1903 to 1905.

== Early life and education ==
Benny was born in Brooklyn, New York, on July 12, 1867. He attended the public schools of Bayonne, New Jersey. He studied law, was admitted to the bar in 1889 and commenced practice in Bayonne.

== Political career ==
He was a member of the Bayonne city council from 1892 to 1894. Benny was a member of the New Jersey General Assembly from 1898 to 1900. He was prosecuting attorney of Bayonne from 1900 to 1903, when he resigned, having been elected to Congress.

=== Congress ===
Benny was elected as a Democrat to the Fifty-eighth Congress, serving in office from March 4, 1903, to March 3, 1905, but was an unsuccessful candidate for reelection in 1904 to the Fifty-ninth Congress.

After leaving Congress, he resumed his law practice, and was assistant librarian of the law library in the courthouse at Jersey City until his death.

== Death ==
He died in Bayonne on November 6, 1942, and was interred in Moravian Cemetery on Staten Island.

U.S. House of Representatives
Preceded by New District	Member of the U.S. House of Representatives from New Jersey's 9th congressional district March 4, 1903 – March 3, 1905	Succeeded by Marshall Van Winkle
