= Richard W. Parker =

American politician

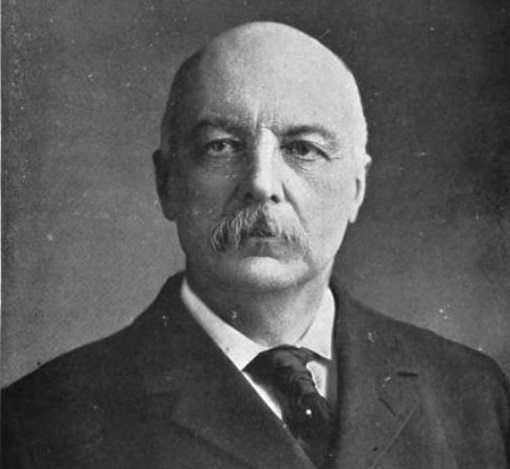

Member of the U.S. House of Representatives from New Jersey
- In office March 4, 1895 – March 3, 1911
- Preceded by: Thomas Dunn English
- Succeeded by: Edward W. Townsend
- Constituency: 6th district (1895–1903); 7th district (1903–11)
- In office December 1, 1914 – March 3, 1919
- Preceded by: Walter I. McCoy
- Succeeded by: Daniel F. Minahan
- Constituency: 9th district
- In office March 4, 1921 – March 3, 1923
- Preceded by: Daniel F. Minahan
- Succeeded by: Daniel F. Minahan
- Constituency: 9th district

Personal details
- Born: Richard Wayne Parker; August 6, 1848 Morristown, New Jersey, U.S.
- Died: November 28, 1923 (aged 75) Paris, France
- Resting place: St. Peter's Churchyard, Perth Amboy, New Jersey
- Party: Republican
- Spouse: Eleanor Kinzie Gordon (m. 1884–1923; his death)
- Relations: James Parker (1854–1934) (brother); Charles Wolcott Parker (brother); Cortlandt Parker (nephew)
- Children: 4
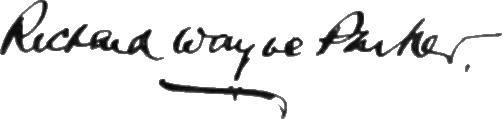
- Signature

Richard Wayne Parker (August 6, 1848 – November 28, 1923) was an American Republican Party politician from New Jersey who represented the 6th congressional district from 1895 to 1903, the 7th district from 1903 to 1911, and the 9th district from 1914 to 1919 and again from 1921 to 1923. He was a son of Cortlandt Parker (1818–1907) and grandson of James Parker, also a representative from New Jersey.

== Biography ==
Born in Morristown, he graduated from Princeton College in 1867 and from Columbia Law School in 1869. He also earned an M.A. from Princeton in 1870, and the same year he was admitted to the bar of New Jersey and commenced practice in Newark.

=== Early political career ===
He was a member of the New Jersey General Assembly in 1885 and 1886 and was an unsuccessful candidate for election to the Fifty-third Congress.

=== Congress ===
Parker was elected as a Republican to the Fifty-fourth and to the seven succeeding Congresses, holding office from March 4, 1895 to March 3, 1911. During the Sixty-first Congress, he was chairman of the Committee on the Judiciary. He was an unsuccessful candidate for reelection in 1910 to the Sixty-second Congress and resumed the practice of law in Newark.

He was then elected to the Sixty-third Congress to fill the vacancy caused by the resignation of Walter I. McCoy, was reelected to the Sixty-fourth and Sixty-fifth Congresses, and served from December 1, 1914, to March 3, 1919. He was an unsuccessful candidate for reelection in 1918 to the Sixty-sixth Congress and was a delegate to the 1916 Republican National Convention. He was elected to the Sixty-seventh Congress, holding office from March 4, 1921 to March 3, 1923, and was an unsuccessful candidate for reelection in 1922 to the Sixty-eighth Congress.

=== Personal life ===
In 1884, Parker married Eleanor Kinzie Gordon, daughter of William Washington Gordon II and Nellie Kinzie Gordon. They had four children: one son and three daughters. Gordon's sister, Juliette Gordon Low, founded the Girls Scouts of the USA in 1912.

=== Death and burial ===
Parker died in Paris, France, on November 28, 1923, after an operation for peritonitis. He was interred in St. Peter's Churchyard in Perth Amboy, New Jersey.

U.S. House of Representatives
Preceded by Thomas Dunn English	Member of the U.S. House of Representatives from New Jersey's 6th congressional district March 4, 1895 – March 3, 1903	Succeeded by William Hughes
Preceded by Allan Langdon McDermott	Member of the U.S. House of Representatives from New Jersey's 7th congressional district March 4, 1903 – March 3, 1911	Succeeded by Edward W. Townsend
Preceded by Walter I. McCoy	Member of the U.S. House of Representatives from New Jersey's 9th congressional district December 1, 1914 – March 3, 1919	Succeeded by Daniel F. Minahan
Preceded by Daniel F. Minahan	Member of the U.S. House of Representatives from New Jersey's 9th congressional district March 4, 1921 – March 3, 1923	Succeeded by Daniel F. Minahan
