= New Jersey's 9th congressional district =

U.S. House district for New Jersey

Coordinates: 40.84°N 74.08°W

- Interactive map of district boundaries since January 3, 2023
- Representative: Nellie Pou; D–North Haledon
- Distribution: 100% urban; 0% rural
- Population (2025): 783,078
- Median household income: $93,341
- Ethnicity: 41.6% Hispanic; 38.3% White; 9.0% Asian; 8.0% Black; 2.1% Two or more races; 1.0% other
- Cook PVI: D+2

New Jersey's 9th congressional district is an congressional district located in New Jersey's Bergen and Passaic Counties. It is currently represented in Congress by Democrat Nellie Pou following the death of 28-year incumbent Bill Pascrell.

== History ==
Following the 2010 census, portions of the 9th district were redrawn into the 5th and 8th districts. The new map resulted in Pascrell's hometown of Paterson being added to the 9th district, which had been represented by Steve Rothman. As a result, both incumbents ran for their party's nomination for the seat in the primary, which Pascrell won. He went on to defeat Rabbi Shmuley Boteach, the Republican nominee, in the general election and ran for 5 more terms before dying at the age of 87.

In the 2024 election, the district shifted dramatically towards Republicans. Donald Trump won by a one-point margin despite a nineteen-point margin against him four years prior. Despite this, Democrat Nellie Pou defeated Republican Billy Prempeh in the congressional race, albeit by a much narrower margin than expected. It was one of 13 congressional districts that voted for Donald Trump in the 2024 presidential election while simultaneously electing a Democrat in the 2024 House of Representatives elections.

== Counties and municipalities in the district ==
For the 118th and successive Congresses (based on redistricting following the 2020 census), the district contains all or portions of three counties and 35 municipalities.

Bergen County (24):

Carlstadt, Cliffside Park, East Rutherford, Edgewater, Elmwood Park, Fairview, Franklin Lakes, Garfield, Hasbrouck Heights, Little Ferry, Lodi, Lyndhurst, Maywood (part, also 5th), Moonachie, North Arlington, Oakland, Ridgefield, Rochelle Park, Rutherford, Saddle Brook, South Hackensack, Teterboro, Wallington, Wood-Ridge

Hudson County (2):

Kearny (part, also 8th), Secaucus

Passaic County (9):

Clifton, Haledon, Hawthorne, North Haledon, Passaic, Paterson, Pompton Lakes, Prospect Park, Wayne (part, also 11th; includes Pines Lake and part of Preakness)

== Recent election results from statewide races ==
Year	Office	Results
2008	President	Obama 61% - 38%
2012	President	Obama 66% - 34%
2016	President	Clinton 61% - 37%
2017	Governor	Murphy 63% - 36%
2018	Senate	Menendez 60% - 37%
2020	President	Biden 59% - 40%
2020	Senate	Booker 61% - 36%
2021	Governor	Murphy 54% - 46%
2024	President	Trump 49% - 48%
2024	Senate	Kim 51% - 45%
2025	Governor	Sherrill 59% - 40%

== List of members representing the district ==
Member (District home)	Party	Years	Cong ress	Electoral history	Counties/towns
District established March 4, 1903
Allan Benny (Bayonne)	Democratic	March 4, 1903 – March 3, 1905	58th	Elected in 1902. Lost re-election.	Hudson County (except parts of Jersey City)
Marshall Van Winkle (Jersey City)	Republican	March 4, 1905 – March 3, 1907	59th	Elected in 1904. Retired.	Hudson County (except parts of Jersey City)
Eugene W. Leake (Jersey City)	Democratic	March 4, 1907 – March 3, 1909	60th	Elected in 1906. Retired.	Hudson County (except parts of Jersey City)
Eugene F. Kinkead (Jersey City)	Democratic	March 4, 1909 – March 3, 1913	61st 62nd	Elected in 1908. Re-elected in 1910. Redistricted to the 8th district.	Hudson County (except parts of Jersey City)
Walter I. McCoy (East Orange)	Democratic	March 4, 1913 – October 3, 1914	63rd	Redistricted from the 8th district and re-elected in 1912. Resigned on appointment as Associate Justice of the Supreme Court of the District of Columbia.	Parts of Essex (East Orange, Orange, and parts of South Orange and Newark)
Vacant		October 3, 1914 – December 1, 1914	63rd		Parts of Essex (East Orange, Orange, and parts of South Orange and Newark)
Richard W. Parker (Newark)	Republican	December 1, 1914 – March 3, 1919	63rd 64th 65th	Elected to finish McCoy's term. Also elected to the next full term. Re-elected in 1916. Lost re-election.	Parts of Essex (East Orange, Orange, and parts of South Orange and Newark)
Daniel F. Minahan (Orange)	Democratic	March 4, 1919 – March 3, 1921	66th	Elected in 1918. Lost re-election.	Parts of Essex (East Orange, Orange, and parts of South Orange and Newark)
Richard W. Parker (Newark)	Republican	March 4, 1921 – March 3, 1923	67th	Elected in 1920. Lost re-election.	Parts of Essex (East Orange, Orange, and parts of South Orange and Newark)
Daniel F. Minahan (Orange)	Democratic	March 4, 1923 – March 3, 1925	68th	Elected in 1922. Lost re-election.	Parts of Essex (East Orange, Orange, and parts of South Orange and Newark)
Franklin William Fort (East Orange)	Republican	March 4, 1925 – March 3, 1931	69th 70th 71st	Elected in 1924. Re-elected in 1926. Re-elected in 1928. Retired to run for U.S. senator.	Parts of Essex (East Orange, Orange, and parts of South Orange and Newark)
Peter Angelo Cavicchia (Newark)	Republican	March 4, 1931 – March 3, 1933	72nd	Elected in 1930. Redistricted to the 11th district.	Parts of Essex (East Orange, Orange, and parts of South Orange and Newark)
Edward Aloysius Kenney (Cliffside Park)	Democratic	March 4, 1933 – January 27, 1938	73rd 74th 75th	Elected in 1932. Re-elected in 1934. Re-elected in 1936. Died.	Parts of Bergen and Hudson (North Bergen)
Vacant		January 27, 1938 – January 3, 1939	75th		Parts of Bergen and Hudson (North Bergen)
Frank C. Osmers Jr. (Haworth)	Republican	January 3, 1939 – January 3, 1943	76th 77th	Elected in 1938. Re-elected in 1940. Retired to become a second lieutenant in the 77th Infantry Division.	Parts of Bergen and Hudson (North Bergen)
Harry Lancaster Towe (Tenafly)	Republican	January 3, 1943 – September 7, 1951	78th 79th 80th 81st 82nd	Elected in 1942. Re-elected in 1944. Re-elected in 1946. Re-elected in 1948. Re-elected in 1950. Resigned to become Assistant Attorney General of New Jersey for Bergen County.	Parts of Bergen and Hudson (North Bergen)
Vacant		September 7, 1951 – November 6, 1951	82nd		Parts of Bergen and Hudson (North Bergen)
Frank C. Osmers Jr. (Tenafly)	Republican	November 6, 1951 – January 3, 1965	82nd 83rd 84th 85th 86th 87th 88th	Elected to finish Towe's term. Re-elected in 1952. Re-elected in 1954. Re-elected in 1956. Re-elected in 1958. Re-elected in 1960. Re-elected in 1962. Lost re-election.	Parts of Bergen and Hudson (North Bergen)
Henry Helstoski (East Rutherford)	Democratic	January 3, 1965 – January 3, 1977	89th 90th 91st 92nd 93rd 94th	Elected in 1964. Re-elected in 1966. Re-elected in 1968. Re-elected in 1970. Re-elected in 1972. Re-elected in 1974. Lost re-election.	[data missing]
Henry Helstoski (East Rutherford)	Democratic	January 3, 1965 – January 3, 1977	89th 90th 91st 92nd 93rd 94th	Elected in 1964. Re-elected in 1966. Re-elected in 1968. Re-elected in 1970. Re-elected in 1972. Re-elected in 1974. Lost re-election.	1967–1969 southern Bergen (Bogota, Carlstadt, Cliffside Park, East Rutherford, Fairview, Fort Lee, Garfield, Hackensack, Hasbrouck Heights, Leonia, Little Ferry, Lodi, Lyndhurst, Maywood, Moonachie, North Arlington, Palisades Park, Saddle Brook, South Hackensack, Ridgefield, Ridgefield Park, Rochelle Park, Rutherford, Teaneck, Teterboro, Wallington, Wood-Ridge)
Henry Helstoski (East Rutherford)	Democratic	January 3, 1965 – January 3, 1977	89th 90th 91st 92nd 93rd 94th	Elected in 1964. Re-elected in 1966. Re-elected in 1968. Re-elected in 1970. Re-elected in 1972. Re-elected in 1974. Lost re-election.	1969–1971; Eastern Bergen
Henry Helstoski (East Rutherford)	Democratic	January 3, 1965 – January 3, 1977	89th 90th 91st 92nd 93rd 94th	Elected in 1964. Re-elected in 1966. Re-elected in 1968. Re-elected in 1970. Re-elected in 1972. Re-elected in 1974. Lost re-election.	1971–1973 [data missing]
Henry Helstoski (East Rutherford)	Democratic	January 3, 1965 – January 3, 1977	89th 90th 91st 92nd 93rd 94th	Elected in 1964. Re-elected in 1966. Re-elected in 1968. Re-elected in 1970. Re-elected in 1972. Re-elected in 1974. Lost re-election.	1973–1977; Eastern Bergen and parts of Hudson
Harold C. Hollenbeck (East Rutherford)	Republican	January 3, 1977 – January 3, 1983	95th 96th 97th	Elected in 1976. Re-elected in 1978. Re-elected in 1980. Lost re-election.	1973–1977; Eastern Bergen and parts of Hudson
Robert Torricelli (Englewood)	Democratic	January 3, 1983 – January 3, 1997	98th 99th 100th 101st 102nd 103rd 104th	Elected in 1982. Re-elected in 1984. Re-elected in 1986. Re-elected in 1988. Re-elected in 1990. Re-elected in 1992. Re-elected in 1994. Retired to run for U.S. senator.	1983–1985 eastern Bergen
Robert Torricelli (Englewood)	Democratic	January 3, 1983 – January 3, 1997	98th 99th 100th 101st 102nd 103rd 104th	Elected in 1982. Re-elected in 1984. Re-elected in 1986. Re-elected in 1988. Re-elected in 1990. Re-elected in 1992. Re-elected in 1994. Retired to run for U.S. senator.	1985–1993; Parts of Bergen and Hudson
Robert Torricelli (Englewood)	Democratic	January 3, 1983 – January 3, 1997	98th 99th 100th 101st 102nd 103rd 104th	Elected in 1982. Re-elected in 1984. Re-elected in 1986. Re-elected in 1988. Re-elected in 1990. Re-elected in 1992. Re-elected in 1994. Retired to run for U.S. senator.	1993–1997; Parts of Bergen and Hudson
Steve Rothman (Fair Lawn)	Democratic	January 3, 1997 – January 3, 2013	105th 106th 107th 108th 109th 110th 111th 112th	Elected in 1996. Re-elected in 1998. Re-elected in 2000. Re-elected in 2002. Re-elected in 2004. Re-elected in 2006. Re-elected in 2008. Re-elected in 2010. Lost renomination.	1993–1997; Parts of Bergen and Hudson
Steve Rothman (Fair Lawn)	Democratic	January 3, 1997 – January 3, 2013	105th 106th 107th 108th 109th 110th 111th 112th	Elected in 1996. Re-elected in 1998. Re-elected in 2000. Re-elected in 2002. Re-elected in 2004. Re-elected in 2006. Re-elected in 2008. Re-elected in 2010. Lost renomination.	2003–2013 Parts of Bergen, Hudson (parts of Jersey City, Kearney, North Bergen and Secaucus) and Passaic (Hawthorne)
Bill Pascrell (Paterson)	Democratic	January 3, 2013 – August 21, 2024	113th 114th 115th 116th 117th 118th	Redistricted from the 8th district and re-elected in 2012. Re-elected in 2014. Re-elected in 2016. Re-elected in 2018. Re-elected in 2020. Re-elected in 2022. Ran for re-election, but died.	2013–2023 Parts of Bergen, Hudson (Secaucus and parts of Kearny), and Passaic (Clifton, Haledon, Hawthorne, Passaic, Paterson and Prospect Park)
Bill Pascrell (Paterson)	Democratic	January 3, 2013 – August 21, 2024	113th 114th 115th 116th 117th 118th	Redistricted from the 8th district and re-elected in 2012. Re-elected in 2014. Re-elected in 2016. Re-elected in 2018. Re-elected in 2020. Re-elected in 2022. Ran for re-election, but died.	2023–present Parts of Bergen, Hudson (parts of Kearny), and Passaic (Clifton, Haledon, Hawthorne, North Haledon, Passaic, Paterson, Prospect Park, Pompton Lakes, and Wayne)
Vacant		August 21, 2024 – January 3, 2025	118th		2023–present Parts of Bergen, Hudson (parts of Kearny), and Passaic (Clifton, Haledon, Hawthorne, North Haledon, Passaic, Paterson, Prospect Park, Pompton Lakes, and Wayne)
Nellie Pou (North Haledon)	Democratic	January 3, 2025 – present	119th	Elected in 2024. Re-elected in 2026.	2023–present Parts of Bergen, Hudson (parts of Kearny), and Passaic (Clifton, Haledon, Hawthorne, North Haledon, Passaic, Paterson, Prospect Park, Pompton Lakes, and Wayne)

== Recent election results ==
=== 2012 ===
New Jersey's 9th congressional district, 2012
Party	Candidate	Votes	%
Democratic	Bill Pascrell (incumbent)	162,822	74.0
Republican	Shmuley Boteach	55,091	25.0
Independent	E. David Smith	1,138	0.5
Constitution	Jeanette Woolsey	1,082	0.5
Total votes		220,133	100.0
Democratic hold			

=== 2014 ===
New Jersey's 9th congressional district, 2014
Party	Candidate	Votes	%
Democratic	Bill Pascrell (incumbent)	82,498	68.5
Republican	Dierdre G. Paul	36,246	30.1
Independent	Nestor Montilla	1,715	1.4
Total votes		120,459	100.0
Democratic hold			

=== 2016 ===
New Jersey's 9th congressional district, 2016
Party	Candidate	Votes	%
Democratic	Bill Pascrell Jr. (incumbent)	162,642	69.8
Republican	Hector L. Castillo	65,376	28.0
Libertarian	Diego Rivera	3,327	1.4
Independent	Jeff Boss	1,897	0.8
Total votes		233,242	100.0
Democratic hold			

=== 2018 ===
New Jersey's 9th congressional district, 2018
Party	Candidate	Votes	%
Democratic	Bill Pascrell Jr. (incumbent)	140,832	70.3
Republican	Eric P. Fisher	57,854	28.9
Libertarian	Claudio Belusic	1,730	0.9
Total votes		200,416	100.0
Democratic hold			

=== 2020 ===
New Jersey's 9th congressional district, 2020
Party	Candidate	Votes	%
Democratic	Bill Pascrell Jr. (incumbent)	203,674	65.8
Republican	Billy Prempeh	98,629	31.9
Independent	Chris Auriemma	7,239	2.3
Total votes		309,542	100.0
Democratic hold			

=== 2022 ===
New Jersey's 9th congressional district, 2022
Party	Candidate	Votes	%
Democratic	Bill Pascrell Jr. (incumbent)	82,115	55.0
Republican	Billy Prempeh	65,214	43.6
Socialist Workers	Lea Sherman	1,103	0.7
Libertarian	Sean Armstrong	1,050	0.7
Total votes		149,482	100.0
Democratic hold			

=== 2024 ===
New Jersey's 9th congressional district, 2024
Party	Candidate	Votes	%
Democratic	Nellie Pou	130,514	50.8
Republican	Billy Prempeh	117,939	45.9
Green	Benjamin Taylor	5,027	2.0
Libertarian	Bruno Pereira	3,533	1.4
Total votes		257,013	100.0
Democratic hold			
