= Newark Academy =

Private school in Livingston, New Jersey, US

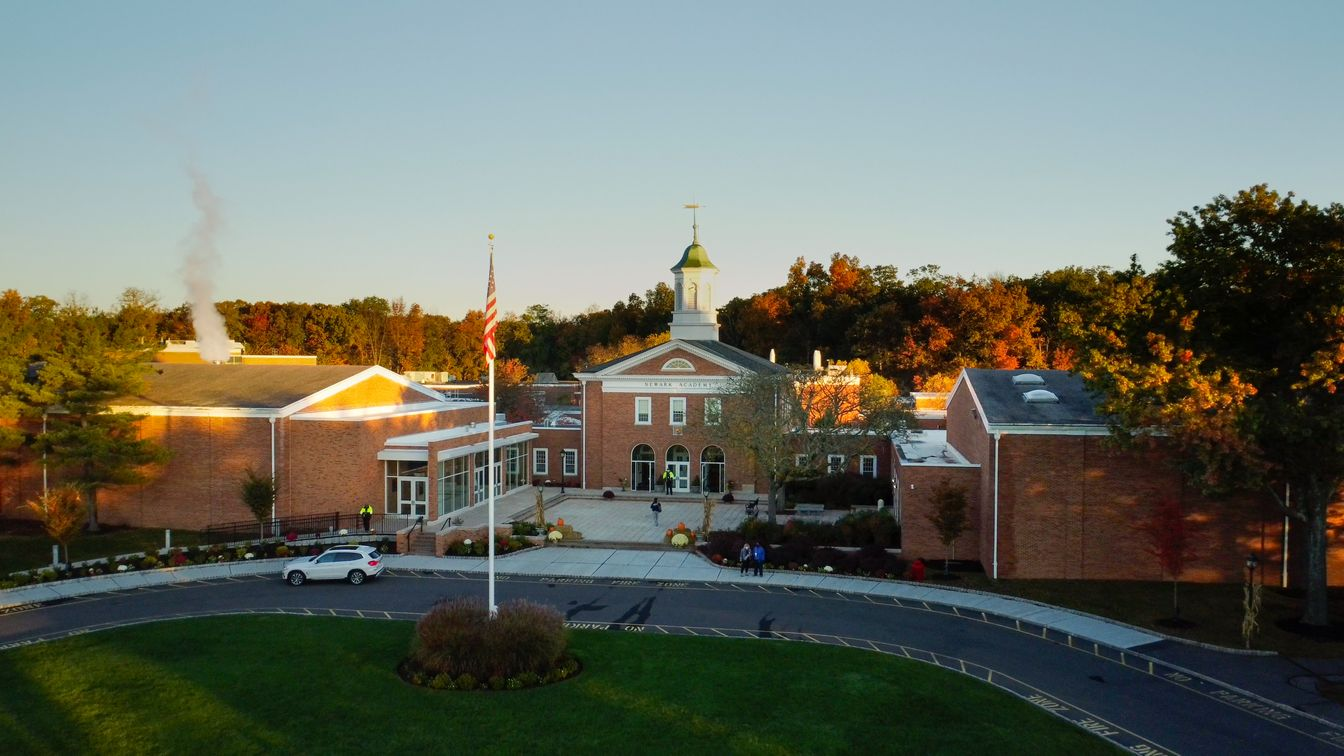

Location
- 91 South Orange Avenue; Livingston, Essex County, New Jersey 07039; United States; 40°46′44″N 74°21′40″W

Information
- Type: Independent Coeducational
- Motto: Ad lumen (Toward Enlightenment)
- Established: 1774; 252 years ago
- Founder: Alexander Macwhorter
- NCES School ID: 00868564
- Principal: Matthew Dandola (Middle School); Kerry Winiarski (Upper School)
- Head of school: Tom Ashburn
- Faculty: 78.5 FTEs
- Grades: 6–12
- Enrollment: 654 (as of 2021–22)
- Average class size: 13
- Student to teacher ratio: 8.3:1
- Campus size: 68 acres (280,000 m^{2})
- Colors: Red; Black
- Athletics: 24 sports
- Athletics conference: Super Essex Conference
- Team name: Minutemen
- Rivals: Montclair Kimberley Academy The Pingry School
- Accreditation: Middle States Association of Colleges and Schools; New Jersey Association of Independent Schools
- Test average: SAT 1440; ACT 32.0
- Publication: Prisms (literary magazine); LUMEN (alumni magazine)
- Newspaper: The Minuteman
- Yearbook: Polymnian
- School fees: $2,000
- Tuition: $51,200 (2024–25)
- Website: www.newarka.edu

Newark Academy is a coeducational private day school located in Livingston, Essex County, in the U.S. state of New Jersey, serving students in sixth through twelfth grades.

It was the first school in New Jersey to offer the International Baccalaureate (IB) program. The school receives about 650 applicants for 115 spots, an acceptance rate of roughly 17%. The school has been accredited by the Middle States Association of Colleges and Schools Commission on Elementary and Secondary Schools since 1928.

As of the 2021–22 school year, the school had an enrollment of 654 students and 78.5 classroom teachers (on an FTE basis), for a student–teacher ratio of 8.3:1. The school's student body was 43.4% (284) White, 30.0% (196) Asian, 11.8% (77) two or more races, 10.1% (66) Black, 4.6% (30) Hispanic and 0.2% (1) Native Hawaiian / Pacific Islander.

== History ==
Newark Academy is one of several pre-Revolutionary War schools still operating in the United States and is considered the seventh-oldest private school in the country and the second-oldest day school in the state of New Jersey (behind Rutgers Preparatory School). The Academy was founded in 1774 by Alexander MacWhorter, a cleric and advisor to George Washington, and was located on Market Street in Downtown Newark. Newark Academy was briefly closed after it was burned by the British during the Revolutionary War. The school then reopened in new quarters in 1792. In 1802, the Academy opened a separate division for girls, but this program was closed in 1859. After 1929, it moved to First Street in the Roseville section of Newark. The Academy moved from Newark to its 68-acre (280,000 m^{2}) campus in Livingston, in 1964, and became fully co-educational in 1971.

== Campus ==
Newark Academy is located on a 68-acre (280,000 m^{2}) campus in northern New Jersey.

The Upper School Academic Center, or the "New Wing", opened in fall 2012 and encompasses 18,500 square feet (1,720 m^{2}) of new construction and 2,500 square feet (230 m^{2}) of renovated space and includes 13 classrooms, two science labs, a multi-purpose area, several small-group collaborative learning spaces and a commons area.

The Wilf Middle School wing opened in fall 2017 and houses two floors of classrooms, laboratories, offices and common spaces that accommodate Middle School teachers and students. Classrooms have Apple TV technology and SmartBoards, which have since been implemented throughout the school. During the construction of the new middle school, Newark Academy also renovated all of the sciences labs, starting with the second-floor natural science and chemistry rooms, and moving on to the first-floor physical science room. These rooms, as well as the laboratories in the middle school, include lab equipment. As part of Experiential learning programs, middle schoolers of every grade go on a series of trips/excursions at the end of the year, called "Capstone" to such destinations as the United Nations.

The Coraci Performance Hall, which opened in the summer of 2020, is a 700-seat facility that has been rebuilt to accommodate the increased size of the student body for Morning Meetings and to provide a performance space for student artists that take the stage for dance, choral, orchestral, jazz, and theatrical performances throughout the school year.

The Hawkes Memorial Library, opened in 1974, houses a 23,000-volume collection, and a periodical and microfilm collection.

The Elizabeth B. McGraw Arts Center, which opened in 1992, contains three studio art classrooms (ceramics, drawing/painting, and a digital media lab for film and photography that opened in the summer of 2022), a band/orchestra room, a choral room, a dance studio, a "black box" theater and an art gallery.

The William E. and Carol G. Simon Family Field House opened in 2001. This 57,000-square-foot (5,300 m^{2}) athletic center houses a gymnasium with three basketball courts, a six-lane pool with a spectator area, a four-lane track and a fitness center. Wrestling and fencing gyms are located in the main building.

Newark Academy's outdoor facilities include courtyards with seating areas, two baseball diamonds, a softball field, an all-weather track, a field hockey area, two lacrosse and soccer fields, two football fields, one basketball half-court, a cross country course and 10 tennis courts.

== Faculty and administration ==
Newark Academy's faculty has an average of 17.5 years of teaching experience, and 90 percent of the 92 teachers and administrators have advanced degrees; 14 have doctorate degrees.

In 2007, Donald M. Austin was appointed as the 49th Head of School for Newark Academy. He previously served as resident director for School Year Abroad in Rennes, France. He earned an undergraduate degree in English and French from Georgetown University and a master's of philosophy in French studies from New York University.

Austin's team of administrators includes Cathy Atwell, upper school principal; Tom Ashburn, middle school principal; Pegeen Galvin, dean of students; and Traci Osterhagen Brock, dean of faculty.

== Student body ==
For the 2023–2024 school year, Newark Academy has students from over 90 communities in grades 6–12. There are 473 students in the Upper School and 204 students in Middle School. Students of color represent 60% of the student population.

== Academics ==
=== Graduation requirements ===
In order to graduate students must complete four years of English, three years of humanities, three years of mathematics, three years of laboratory science, proficiency in a second language (level 3), one year of arts, three June Terms, an immersion trip, 40 hours of community service, and a senior project.

=== Academic offerings ===
Newark Academy offers a wide variety of classes across disciplines and at many different levels. Newark Academy offers many IB and AP classes, in addition to other college-level classes in Multivariable calculus, Differential Equations, Linear algebra, Non-Euclidean geometry, and Number theory.

Newark Academy is part of the Malone Schools Online Network, a consortium of 27 independent schools across the country that offers a selection of 46 classes available online in conjunction with one another, run by teachers at the member schools. MSON offers many college-level and elective classes such as "Are We Rome?," "Creative Writing in the Digital Age" and "Positive Psychology."

Newark Academy also offers an Independent Studies program for seniors. Seniors may elect to take a self-designed full-year course on a topic of their choosing. Students work with a faculty advisor, and often one other student who helped design the course, throughout the year researching the topic at hand and culminating in a final project. Courses in the past have focused on feminism, and American modern judicial history, amongst other subjects.

=== Advanced curricula ===
Newark Academy is the only independent school in New Jersey that offers both the Advanced Placement (AP) and International Baccalaureate Diploma (IB) programs.

==== Advanced Placement ====
The College Board's Advanced Placement Program (AP) offers high school students the opportunity to do college-level work. Successful achievement on the culminating exams may result in credit or advanced placement upon matriculation to college. Newark Academy offers 4 AP classes (US History, Calculus AB, Calculus BC, and Calculus AB/BC).

==== International Baccalaureate ====
In 1991, Newark Academy became the first school in New Jersey to grant the International Baccalaureate diploma. The I.B. diploma is awarded following the successful completion of a rigorous two-year curriculum. 47 members of the Class of 2021 pursued the full IB diploma. Approximately 95 percent of the Class of 2023 was enrolled in at least one IB course.

== Awards, recognition and rankings ==
Niche.com ranked Newark Academy fourth in its "Best College Prep Private High Schools in New Jersey", fourth in "Best Private High Schools in New Jersey" and ninth in "Best High Schools for STEM in New Jersey." The school received an A+ for teachers, academics, clubs & activities, and college prep. Niche ranked it as the 12th best private high school in the New York City area. Niche.com ranked the school as the 37th best private high school on its list of the 2024 Best Schools in America.

The school was listed in the top 100 prep schools in the world according to Prep Review. In 2024, Niche awarded it the best school in Essex County for its high school program.

== Athletics ==
The Newark Academy Minutemen compete in the Super Essex Conference, which is comprised of public and private high schools in Essex County and operates under the supervision of the New Jersey State Interscholastic Athletic Association (NJSIAA). Before the NJSIAA's 2010 realignment, the school had previously participated in the Colonial Hills Conference which included public and private high schools covering Essex County, Morris County and Somerset County in west Central Jersey. With 315 students in grades 10-12, the school was classified by the NJSIAA for the 2019–20 school year as Non-Public B for most athletic competition purposes, which included schools with an enrollment of 37 to 366 students in that grade range (equivalent to Group I for public schools). The school was classified by the NJSIAA as Non-Public Group B (equivalent to Group I/II for public schools) for football for 2024–2026, which included schools with 140 to 686 students.

Newark Academy offers a total of 25 varsity sports programs over the course of the school year:

- Fall sports: boys' and girls' cross country, field hockey, football, boys' and girls' soccer, girls' tennis, and girls' volleyball
- Winter sports: boys' and girls' basketball, fencing, boys' and girls' fencing, boys' and girls' swimming, winter track and boys' wrestling
- Spring sports: baseball, boys' and girls' golf, boys' and girls' lacrosse, softball, boys' tennis and boys' and girls' track and field

Middle School students are required to participate in at least one sport each season. Students in the Upper School are not required to play a sport, but approximately 87% choose to do so.

The boys' fencing team was the overall state champion in 2020 and was the foil team winner in 2014 and 2016. Head Coach Daniel Bailey-Yavonditte was named the USA Fencing 2020 High School Coach of the Year.

The girls' tennis team won the Non-Public Group B state championship in 1992, 1993, 1996–2002, 2010, 2011, 2013–2016 and 2021. The team won the Tournament of Champions in 1993 (defeating runner-up Moorestown High School in the finals), 1996–1998 (vs. Millburn High School all three years), 1999–2001 (vs. Moorestown all three years) and 2002 (vs. Cherry Hill High School East). The program's 16 state championships are the fourth-most in the state and the eight ToC titles are ranked second.

The boys' tennis team was the Non-Public state group champions in 1992–2007, 2009, and 2011–2021. The program's 27 state group titles are the most of any school in the state and the streak of 16 consecutive titles from 1992 to 2007 is the state's longest. The team won the Tournament of Champions in 1995–2001, 2003–2005, 2009, 2016 and 2021. The program's 14 ToC titles are the most in New Jersey. The 2021 team won the program's record 27th state title with a 5-0 win in the Non-Public tournament final against Pingry School.

The wrestling team won the Non-Parochial Group B state sectional championship and the Non-Parochial B state title in 1997.

The boys' soccer team won the Non-Public Group B state championship in 2007 (defeating runner-up Holy Cross Preparatory Academy in the final of the tournament) and 2015 (vs. Moorestown Friends School). The 2007 team won the Non-Public B state title with a 1-0 win against Holy Cross in the championship game.

The boys' cross-country team won the Non-Public Group B state championship in 2015, 2018, 2019 and 2021. In 2021, head coach Sarah Guelich was awarded NJ Coach of the Year by NJ.com.

The volleyball team won the program’s first-ever NJSIAA Non-Public B state championship in 2021, defeating Immaculate Conception High School in the finals.

From 1984 to 1989, Newark Academy was the site of the Livingston Open, a Grand Prix tennis circuit tournament. The Grand Prix was the only professional circuit from 1985 until it was succeeded by the ATP Tour in 1990. The tournament was won by Andre Agassi in 1988, earning him the seventh title in his career.

== Publications ==
Newark Academy has five publications: the student newspaper, The Minuteman, in publication since 1941; the newspaper's annual magazine, Minuteman Life; the yearbook, The Polymnian; and the literary magazine, Prisms, Newark Academy also publishes an alumni magazine, Lumen, twice a year.

== Notable alumni ==
- Ryan Adeleye (born 1987), Israeli-American professional soccer player
- Samuel Fowler Bigelow (1837–1915), judge, attorney and author
- Jennifer Choe-Groves (born 1969, class of 1987), federal judge of the United States Court of International Trade
- Samuel S. Coursen (1926–1950, class of 1945), posthumous recipient of the Medal of Honor during the Korean War
- Lanny Davis (born 1945, class of 1963), lawyer, consultant, lobbyist, author and television commentator, served in both the Clinton and Bush administrations
- James Mapes Dodge (1852–1915), mechanical engineer, inventor and industrialist, served as president of the American Society of Mechanical Engineers
- Forrest F. Dryden (1864–1932), president of Prudential Insurance Company of America (now Prudential Financial) 1912–1922
- William W. Evans Jr. (1921–1999), politician, served in the New Jersey General Assembly 1960–1962; candidate for the Republican nomination for president in 1968
- Frederick Samuel Fish (1852–1936), lawyer, politician and automotive manufacturing executive who headed the Studebaker corporation
- Jared Gilman (born 1998), actor who appeared in the film Moonrise Kingdom
- Justin Gimelstob (born 1977), ATP professional tennis player
- Leo M. Gordon (born 1952), justice of the United States Court of International Trade
- Walter Granville-Smith (1870–1938) illustrator and painter who produced the first colored illustration that appeared in the United States
- Asher Grodman (born 1987), actor, starred on Ghosts
- Matt Gutman (born 1977), ABC News correspondent
- Alan B. Handler (1931–2024), New Jersey Supreme Court justice 1977–1999
- Maya Hayes (born 1992), assistant coach for Minnesota Golden Gophers women's soccer team and former player for Sky Blue FC
- Coleman Hughes (born 1996), political columnist
- Chris Jacobs (born 1964), swimming medalist at the 1988 Summer Olympics
- Denise J. Jamieson (born c. 1965, class of 1983), gynecologist who is the James Robert McCord Chair in Gynecology and Obstetrics at Emory University and former medical officer in the United States Public Health Service
- Ernest Lester Jones (1876–1929), head of the United States Coast and Geodetic Survey from 1914 until his death
- Philip D. Kaltenbacher (born 1937, class of 1955), former chairman and CEO of Seton Company and a former chairman of the Port Authority of New York and New Jersey
- Stacey Kent (born 1965), jazz singer
- Thomas Kiernan (1933–2003), writer of biographies of Laurence Olivier, Jane Fonda, John Steinbeck and Yasser Arafat
- Jay I. Kislak (1922–2018), businessman, philanthropist, bibliophile, and aviator
- Thomas N. McCarter (1867–1955), CEO of PSE&G Corporation, developer of Penn Station, and original benefactor of the McCarter Theatre in Princeton
- Roderick Fletcher Mead (1900–1971), painter best known for his engravings
- Frank Meyer (1909–1972), political philosopher and activist best known for his theory of "fusionism" and role at National Review
- Cortlandt Parker (1884–1960), US Army major general
- James Parker (1854–1934), Major General in the United States Army and a Medal of Honor recipient for his role in the Philippine–American War during 1899
- Daniel Quillen (1940–2011), mathematician and Fields Medal recipient in 1978 for his work on algebraic K-theory
- Stuart Risch (class of 1980), United States Army lieutenant general, 41st Judge Advocate General of the United States Army
- Lyndsey Scott (born 1984), model, software developer and actress
- William E. Simon (1927–2000), 63rd secretary of the treasury under Richard Nixon
- Gus Stager (1923–2019), coach of the 1960 U.S. Olympic swim team who was swimming coach at the University of Michigan for 25 years
- Bo Sullivan (1937–2000), chairman of the New Jersey Turnpike Authority, Republican Party politician, sought the nomination for governor of New Jersey in the 1981 primary
- Richard Thaler (born 1945, class of 1963), economist specializing in behavioral economics and Nobel Prize recipient in 2017 for his contributions to the field
- Salamishah Tillet (born 1975, class of 1992), 2022 Pulitzer Prize in Criticism winner, feminist activist, scholar and writer
- Franklin Van Antwerpen (1941–2016, class of 1960), Senior United States Circuit Judge on the United States Court of Appeals for the Third Circuit
- Cortlandt Whitehead (1842–1922), bishop of the Episcopal Diocese of Pittsburgh 1882–1922
- William Adee Whitehead (1810–1884), historian, surveyor, customs official and public servant
- Jocelyn Willoughby (born 1998, class of 2016), free agent basketball player who played for the New York Liberty of the WNBA
- Carl Zigrosser (1891–1975), art dealer best known for founding and running the Weyhe Gallery in the 1920s and 1930s
