= Eugene W. Leake =

American politician (1877–1959)

Member of the U.S. House of Representatives from New Jersey's 9th district
- In office March 4, 1907 – March 3, 1909
- Preceded by: Marshall Van Winkle
- Succeeded by: Eugene F. Kinkead

Personal details
- Born: July 13, 1877 Jersey City, New Jersey, U.S.
- Died: August 23, 1959 (aged 82) New York City, New York, U.S.
- Party: Democratic

Eugene Walter Leake (July 13, 1877 – August 23, 1959) was an American Democratic Party politician from New Jersey who represented the 9th congressional district for one term from 1907 to 1909.

== Early life and education ==
Leake was born in Jersey City, New Jersey on July 13, 1877. He attended the public schools and Phillips Academy, Andover, Massachusetts, and graduated from New York Law School in 1898. He was admitted to the New Jersey bar in 1898 and commenced practice in Jersey City. In 1908, he was admitted to the New York bar and practiced in New York City.

== Congress ==
Leake was elected as a Democrat to the Sixtieth Congress, serving in office from March 4, 1907 – March 3, 1909, but was not a candidate for renomination in 1908.

== Later life ==
After leaving Congress, he was general counsel for the Adams Express Co. from 1927-1932. In 1931, he was elected chairman of the board of directors of the American Railway Express Co., and was a director of Loew's, Inc.

== Death ==
He died in New York City on August 23, 1959, and was interred in Cedar Lawn Cemetery in Paterson, New Jersey.

Leake and his wife Marion (Paige) Leake were the parents of two sons, one of whom, Eugene Leake, was a notable artist and museum curator.

U.S. House of Representatives
Preceded by Marshall Van Winkle	Member of the U.S. House of Representatives from New Jersey's 9th congressional district March 4, 1907 – March 3, 1909	Succeeded by Walter I. McCoy
