= Marshall Van Winkle =

American politician

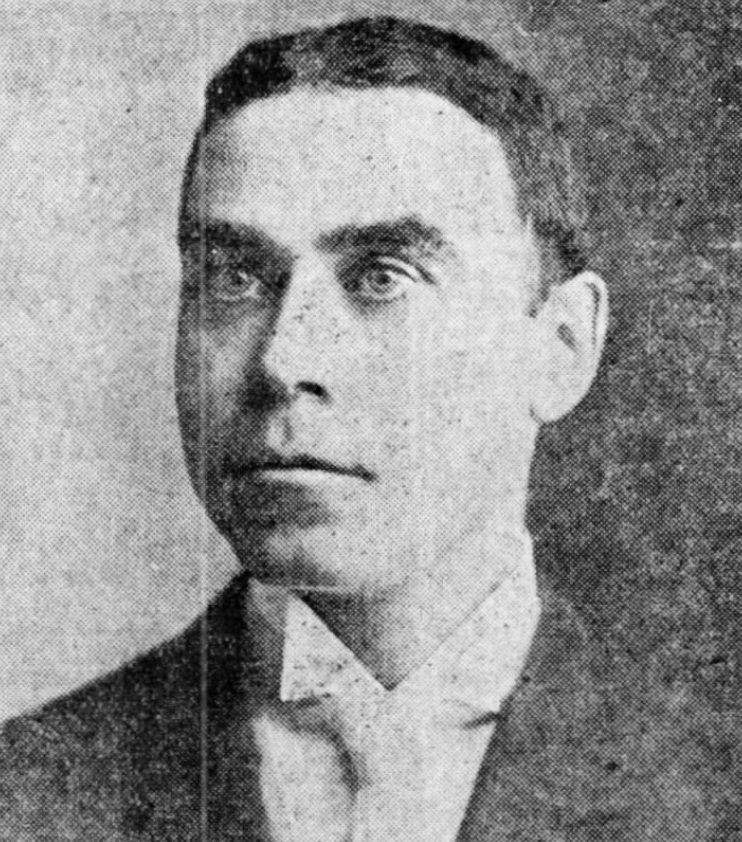
- Great Falls Daily Tribune (Great Falls, MT), December 27, 1905

Member of the U.S. House of Representatives from New Jersey's 9th district
- In office March 4, 1905 – March 3, 1907
- Preceded by: Allan Benny
- Succeeded by: Eugene W. Leake

Personal details
- Born: September 28, 1869 Jersey City, New Jersey, U.S.
- Died: May 10, 1957 (aged 87) Oceanport, New Jersey, U.S.
- Party: Republican

Marshall Van Winkle (September 28, 1869 – May 10, 1957) was a U.S. representative from New Jersey, grandnephew of Peter G. Van Winkle.

== Biography ==
Born in Jersey City, New Jersey, Van Winkle attended the public schools. He studied law. He was admitted to the bar in 1890 and commenced practice in Hoboken, New Jersey. He was appointed counsel to the county tax board in 1895, holding this position until his resignation to accept an appointment as the assistant prosecutor of the pleas of Hudson County, New Jersey. He was an unsuccessful candidate for election in 1900 to the Fifty-seventh Congress. He served as assistant prosecutor of pleas from 1902 to 1905, when he resigned to become a candidate for Congress.

Van Winkle was elected as a Republican to the Fifty-ninth Congress (March 4, 1905 – March 3, 1907). He was not a candidate for renomination in 1906. He resumed the practice of law in Jersey City, New Jersey. Advisory master in chancery, matrimonial division from 1933 to 1939. Wrote and published law reference books. He died in Oceanport, New Jersey, May 10, 1957. He was interred in Fairview Mausoleum in Fairview, New Jersey.

U.S. House of Representatives
Preceded by Allan Benny	Member of the U.S. House of Representatives from New Jersey's 9th congressional district March 4, 1905 – March 3, 1907	Succeeded by Eugene W. Leake
