= Charles Wolcott Parker =

American judge (1862–1948)

Charles Wolcott Parker (1862–1948) was a justice of the Supreme Court of New Jersey from 1907 to 1947. He presided at the 1926 Hall–Mills murder trial and wrote a 1935 unanimous opinion upholding the Bruno Richard Hauptmann murder conviction. Parker also presided alongside Joseph B. Perskie over the NJ State Supreme Court Case, Everson vs Board of Education of Ewing Township, which would lead to the landmark US Supreme Court decision on the separation of church and state.

Charles W. Parker was born in Newark on October 22, 1862, son of Cortlandt Parker (1818–1907). He was the younger brother of U.S. Congressman Richard W. Parker and Army Major General James Parker, and uncle of Cortlandt Parker. Charles Parker studied at the Pingry School and Phillips Exeter Academy before earning an A.B. degree from Princeton University in 1882. In 1885, he completed an A.M. degree at Princeton and received a LL.B. degree from Columbia Law School.

Parker was a Republican. He served as judge for the New Jersey 2nd District, 1898–1903 and circuit judge from 1903 to 1907. He was appointed by Governor Edward C. Stokes as an associate justice of the New Jersey Supreme Court in 1907, succeeding John Franklin Fort, and serving thereafter until September 1947. He was conferred an honorary LL.D. degree by Princeton in 1919.

Parker served in the New Jersey State Militia from 1890 to 1907, advancing from private to lieutenant colonel and serving as an assistant adjutant general from 1902 to 1907. He also served as an aide-de-camp to Governor Franklin Murphy from 1902 to 1904.

Parker resided in Morristown. He died there on January 23, 1948, and is interred at Mount Pleasant Cemetery in Newark.

== See also ==
- List of justices of the Supreme Court of New Jersey
