= Jay I. Kislak =

American businessman and philanthropist

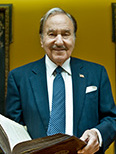
- Jay I. Kislak at the Library of Congress
- Born: June 6, 1922; Hoboken, New Jersey, U.S.
- Died: October 3, 2018 (aged 96); Miami, Florida, U.S.
- Occupations: Real Estate, Philanthropist
- Known for: Founder of the Kislak Family Foundation

Jay I. Kislak (June 6, 1922 – October 3, 2018) was an American businessman, philanthropist, bibliophile, and aviator.

== Early life and education ==
Kislak was born in Hoboken, New Jersey on June 6, 1922. He earned his first real estate license in high school at the Newark Academy in Livingston, New Jersey. He attended and graduated from the Wharton School of the University of Pennsylvania, where he majored in economics.

Upon graduation, he served as a U.S.Navy aviator in World War II. In 1945, Kislak returned to New Jersey to enter the family real estate business full-time. In the early 1950s, Kislak moved his family to Miami, where established one of the country's largest privately held mortgage banks, originating and servicing loans nationally for over 40 years. He served as chairman of the Kislak Organization.

From 1984 to 2020, the Kislak Foundation's philanthropic giving was focused on rare books, art, and historic documents. Many of the items in the collection have been donated to the Library of Congress and several university libraries.

== Philanthropy ==
=== National Air and Space Museum ===
The Smithsonian Institution's National Air and Space Museum in Washington, D.C. received $10 million from the Kislak Family Foundation to support the creation of the new "World War II in the Air" exhibition. It will be named the "Jay I. Kislak World War II in the Air" gallery. The gallery will explore how World War II transformed aviation and warfare and inaugurated a new era in military aviation. Flying was a family legacy and Kislack celebrated his 95th birthday on the USS Intrepid (CV-11) aircraft carrier.

=== Library of Congress donations ===
In 2022, the Kislak Family Foundation donated $10 million to the Library of Congress in Washington, D.C. to create a gallery exploring the history of the early Americas.

Kislak first donated nearly 4,000 items from his collection to the Library of Congress in 2004. This included rare masterpieces of indigenous art, maps, manuscripts, and cultural treasures documenting more than a dozen Native cultures and the earliest history of the Americas. In 2018, the Library of Congress appointed the first Jay I. Kislak Chair for the Study of the History and Cultures of the Early Americas.

In 2023 an annual Kislak Family Foundation Prize to recognize an organization in the United States or abroad with an outsized impact on literacy relative to its size or years of operation was announced by the Library of Congress.

=== Sothebys auction ===
Jay I. Kislak's substantial collection extended far beyond the nearly 4,000 items he donated to the Library of Congress. His collection included impressionist, modernist, and contemporary art and prints, photographs, designs, books and manuscripts. Sotheby’s departments are currently consigning many of works from the collection, including Richard Diebenkorn’s Berkeley Six, Raoul Dufy’s Les Martigues, Mary Cassatt’s Girl in a Hat with a Black Ribbon, Diego Giacometti’s Hommage à Böcklin console, William Bourne’s A Regiment for the Sea and Daniel Giraud Elliot’s Monograph of the Felidae or Family of Cats.

In addition to the Library of Congress, Kislak donated to multiple institutions of higher learning, including the University of Miami, Miami Dade College, Florida State University, the University of Pennsylvania, and the University of Florida.

=== Kislak Center at the University of Miami and Freedom Tower at Miami Dade College ===
The Kislak Center at the University of Miami Libraries was established with original source materials related to the history of the early Americas.

The gift established a partnership between the University of Miami and Miami Dade College.

=== Kislak Center at the University of Pennsylvania Libraries ===
Jay I. Kislak and the Kislak Family Foundation donated $5.5 million to the University of Pennsylvania Libraries in Philadelphia to complete the renovation of the 5th and 6th floors of the Van Pelt-Dietrich Library Center and also contributed to ongoing Kislak Center programming. Additionally, Kislak gifted the Penn Libraries books from the library of Jacques Auguste de Thou.

=== Kislak Family Foundation Artist/Writer in Residence at the University of Florida ===
The Center for Latin American Studies at the University of Florida received a donation from the Kislak Family Foundation to establish an artist/writer in residence program. The program funds a visiting artist or writer who teaches courses, conducts workshops, delivers lectures, and tutors students on the main Gainesville campus. The program's purpose is to bring preeminence to the University of Florida in the field of Latin American art and expose the campus community to works of art and literature.

In 2022, Gabriela Alemán was the first selected Kislak Family Foundation Artist/Writer in Residence.

=== Kislak Real Estate Institute at Monmouth University ===
In 2006, on the 100th anniversary of the Kislak Real Estate Company, a seven-figure donation was made to Monmouth University in West Long Branch, New Jersey, which named its Real Estate Institute for Kislak.

== Honors and recognitions ==
In recognition of his efforts to preserve cultural heritage, Kislak was appointed by President George W. Bush to head U.S. Department of State's Cultural Property Advisory Committee from 2003 through 2008. In 2013, Kislak received the Encomienda of the Order of Merit Civil from the King of Spain, among other awards and appointments. In 2017 he was awarded the Lifetime Achievement Award from the Association of Fundraising Professionals.

Kislak and his family were among the 25 founding families of Temple Beth Am in Pinecrest, Florida, one of the largest temples in Florida. He also was a member of Temple Israel of Greater Miami in Miami and Synagogue Adas Yoshurun in Rockland, Maine.
