= Jim Parker (footballer) =

English footballer

Personal information
- Full name: Jonathan Parker
- Place of birth: Barrow-in-Furness, England
- Position: Defender

Senior career*
Years	Team	Apps	(Gls)
1905–1908	Burnley	32	(1)
1908–1913	Bradford Park Avenue	80	(4)
	Barrow	?	(?)
- * Club domestic league appearances and goals

Jonathan "Jim" Parker was an English professional footballer from Barrow-in-Furness, Lancashire who played as a central defender.
