= James Parker (Medal of Honor) =

United States Army general

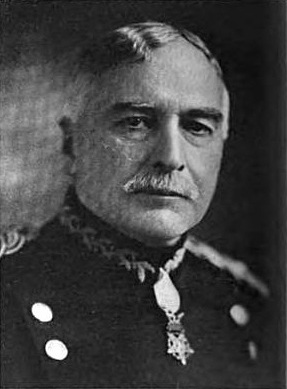
- James Parker, Medal of Honor recipient
- Born: February 20, 1854; Newark, New Jersey, US
- Died: June 2, 1934 (aged 80); New York City, US
- Burial place: Saint Mary's Episcopal Churchyard, Portsmouth, Rhode Island
- Relatives: Maj. Gen. Cortlandt Parker, U.S. Army – son; Commander James Parker, Jr., USN – son James Parker – grandson
- Military career
- Allegiance: United States
- Branch: United States Army
- Service years: 1876–1918
- Rank: Major General
- Service number: 0-451
- Commands: 32nd Infantry Division; 85th Infantry Division
- Conflicts: Indian Wars; Spanish–American War; Philippine–American War; World War I
- Awards: Medal of Honor; Distinguished Service Medal; Silver Star (3)

James Parker (February 20, 1854 – June 2, 1934) was a major general in the United States Army and a Medal of Honor recipient for his role in the Philippine–American War during 1899. His son, Cortlandt Parker, also became a major general in the United States Army.

== Early life and education ==
Parker was born in Newark, New Jersey on February 20, 1854, a son of Cortlandt Parker (1818-1907) and Elizabeth (Stites) Parker. He was a member of a family long active in New Jersey government and politics. His father was a prominent attorney who served as public prosecutor of Essex County. His grandfather, James Parker (1776-1868) was a member of Congress. His older brother, Richard W. Parker also served in the United States House of Representatives. A younger brother, Charles W. Parker served as a justice of the Supreme Court of New Jersey. Parker's nephew Henry Parkman Jr. was the son of Parker's sister Mary.

James Parker was educated at Newark Academy, Phillips Academy (Andover, Massachusetts) and Rutgers College, where he was admitted to the Zeta Psi fraternity. He graduated from the United States Military Academy at West Point, New York in 1876, 31st in a class of 50 cadets, and was appointed second lieutenant.

== Military career ==
He spent his early years serving in the Fourth United States Cavalry participating in the Indian Wars of the Southwest. His military career was influenced by the magnetic personality of the commander of the Fourth Cavalry, General Ranald S. Mackenzie, a legend for his success as a cavalry commander in the American Civil War. In May 1886, First Lieutenant Parker commanded one column of troops sent into Mexico to track down the famous Apache leader Geronimo and his band, and cooperated with Captain Henry W. Lawton and First Lieutenant Charles B. Gatewood when Geronimo was captured.

In early 1899, he served as second in command of the 12th New York Infantry during the occupation of Cuba following the Spanish–American War and saw significant combat while commanding the 45th Volunteer Infantry in the Philippine–American War during 1899 where he earned the Medal of Honor. From 1903 to 1904, he also served as Head of Militia Affairs in the Adjutant General's office.

During the First World War, General Parker served as Commander of the Southern Department, Fort Sam Houston, Texas from 31 March 1917 to 25 August 1917; as division commander of the 32nd Division from 25 August to 11 December 1917; and as division commander of the 85th Division from 11 December 1917 to 20 February 1918, when, having reached the statutory age of 64, he was retired from active service.

== Retirement and death ==
He retired on February 20, 1934 and moved to Newport, Rhode Island where he died on June 2, 1934. He is buried in a family plot at St. Mary's Episcopal Churchyard in Portsmouth, Rhode Island.

His papers are held by the United States Military Academy.

== Family ==
Parker's son, Cortlandt Parker, was also a graduate of West Point and pursued a career in the Army retiring with the rank of major general.

== Military awards ==
In addition to the Medal of Honor, Major General Parker was awarded the Distinguished Service Medal and three Silver Stars for his service and battlefield exploits.

Full list of decorations and medals:

- Medal of Honor
- Distinguished Service Medal
- Silver Star with two oak leaf clusters (retroactive award in 1932)
- Indian Campaign Medal
- Spanish War Service Medal
- Army of Cuban Occupation Medal
- Philippine Campaign Medal
- World War I Victory Medal

=== Medal of Honor citation ===
Citation:

While in command of a small garrison repulsed a savage night attack by overwhelming numbers of the enemy, fighting at close quarters in the dark for several hours.

== Publications ==
- Parker, James. The Mounted Rifleman; A Method of Garrison Training and Field Instruction of Cavalry, Including Tests and Combat Exercises, As Used in the First Cavalry Brigade, U.S. Army. Menasha, Wis: George Banta Pub. Co, 1916. OCLC 5508503
- Parker, James. The Old Army; Memories, 1872-1918. Philadelphia: Dorrance & Co, 1929. OCLC 518366

== See also ==
- List of Medal of Honor recipients
