= James Parker (priest) =

James Parker (October 22, 1930 in Charleston, South Carolina - May 11, 2016) was a priest of the Roman Catholic Church. He had earlier been an Anglican priest before he converted to Catholicism. On June 28, 1982, he was ordained to the priesthood in the Roman Catholic Church with the approval of the pope. He married Mary Alma Cole on July 28, 1953, and was ordained Episcopal Church priest on July 25, 1957
