= James Parker (New Jersey politician) =

United States Representative from New Jersey (1776–1868)

Member of the U.S. House of Representatives from New Jersey's at-large district district
- In office March 4, 1833 – March 3, 1837
- Preceded by: James F. Randolph
- Succeeded by: Joseph F. Randolph

Mayor of Perth Amboy, New Jersey
- In office 1850–1851
- In office 1815–1816

Personal details
- Born: March 3, 1776 Bethlehem, Province of New Jersey, British America
- Died: April 1, 1868 (aged 92) Perth Amboy, New Jersey, U.S.
- Party: Jacksonian
- Spouses: Penelope Coats Butler (m. 1803; died 1823) Catherine Morris Ogden (m. 1827)
- Relations: James Parker (grandson); R. Wayne Parker (grandson); Cortlandt Skinner (uncle)
- Children: 9
- Parent(s): James Parker Sr. Gertrude Skinner Parker
- Education: Columbia College

James Parker Jr. (March 3, 1776 – April 1, 1868) was a United States representative from New Jersey. He served as the Collector of the Port of New Jersey in Perth Amboy from 1829 to 1833. He was Mayor of Perth Amboy, New Jersey.

== Early life ==
Parker was born at "Shipley", his father's farm in Bethlehem in the Province of New Jersey on March 3, 1776 to James Parker Sr. (1725–1797) and Gertrude MacGregor (née Skinner) Parker (1739–1811). His father was on the provincial council before the Revolution, an active member of the board of proprietors of the colony, and the owner of large landed properties.

Through his father, Parker's great-grandfather was James Parker, a prominent colonial American printer and publisher. His maternal grandparents were the Rev. William Skinner (the Rector of St. Peter's Church in Perth Amboy) and Elizabeth (née Van Cortlandt) Skinner (the daughter of Stephanus Van Cortlandt, the first native born mayor of New York). His uncle was Brig. Gen. Cortlandt Skinner, the last Royal Attorney General of New Jersey and a Loyalist with the New Jersey Volunteers, also known as Skinner's Greens, during the Revolutionary War.

== Career ==
Parker moved to Perth Amboy after the Revolution. He graduated from Columbia College of Columbia University in New York City in 1793, and then became a merchant in Manhattan, New York City, but on the death of his father returned to Perth Amboy.

Parker engaged in the management and settlement of properties left by his father. He was also a land surveyor and trained as a lawyer, although he was never admitted to the bar. He was a member of the New Jersey General Assembly from 1806 to 1810 and in 1812–1813, 1815–1816, 1818, and 1827. During his legislative career, he originated the law that put an end to the local slave trade in 1819, the one that established the school fund, and the provisions of a law that regulated the partition of real estate in New Jersey and the rights of aliens to possess it. He was Mayor of Perth Amboy, New Jersey in 1815 and again in 1850. He was Collector of the Port of New Jersey in Perth Amboy from 1829 to 1833.

Parker was elected as a Jacksonian to the 23rd and 24th Congresses, holding office from March 4, 1833 to March 3, 1837.

After leaving Congress he resumed his former activities, and was registrar of the board of proprietors of East Jersey. He was a member of the different boundary commissions to obtain a settlement of the boundary question between the States of New York and New Jersey, and was a delegate to the New Jersey constitutional convention in 1844.

He was a vice president of the New Jersey Historical Society for many years, its president from 1864 until his death, was active in the cause of education, and gave the land to Rutgers College on which its buildings now stand.

== Slavery ==
During the early decades of the 19th century, James Parker held several Black people in slavery in his household. These people included a woman named Nancy (inherited from his father's estate), Nancy's children, and a man named John Annin. Parker purchased John Annin, also known as Jack, in 1807 and then manumitted by him in 1822. In 1818, Parker grew concerned about the problem of slave traffickers kidnapping Black people from New Jersey for sale in the domestic slave trade. He was one of the organizers of an association for the purpose of opposing the practice of kidnapping, which was formed in Middlesex County, New Jersey, on July 30, 1818. He was the Secretary of the organization. The following year, he took the issue of human trafficking to the New Jersey legislature and successfully advocated for a law that made it more difficult for slave traders to take Black people out of the state of New Jersey.

== Personal life ==
On January 5, 1803, Parker was married to Penelope Coats Butler (1788–1823), the daughter of Anthony Butler and Elizabeth (née Coates) Butler. Together, they were the parents of:

- James Parker (1804–1805), who died young.
- James Parker (1805–1861), who married Anna Forbes.
- William Parker (1807–1868), who married Lucy Cushing Whitwell (1811–1909) in 1836. William was one of the earliest railroad builders and was associated with the building of the Boston & Worcester Railroad.
- Margaret Elizabeth Parker (1809–1886), who married William Adee Whitehead (1810–1884), a historian who assisted in the development of Key West.
- Gertrude Parker (1811–1828), who died aged 16.
- Penelope Parker (1813–1817), who died young.
- Sarah Coats Levy Parker (1816–1842), who died unmarried.
- Cortlandt Parker (1818–1907), who married Elizabeth Wolcott Stites (1827–1907), the daughter of Richard Wayne Stites, in 1847.
- Penelope Butler Parker (1821–1856), who married Edward Dunham (1819–1892) in 1855.

After his first wife's death in 1823, Parker remarried to Catherine Morris Ogden on September 20, 1827. Catherine was the daughter of Euphemia (née Morris) Ogden and Samuel Ogden, the founder of Boonton Iron Works. Through her father she was a niece of Abraham Ogden and through her mother, she was a niece of Gouverneur Morris, a U.S. Senator and U.S. Minister to France.

Parker died in Perth Amboy, New Jersey on April 1, 1868. He was buried in St. Peter's Episcopal Churchyard.

=== Descendants ===
Through his son Cortlandt, he was the grandfather of James Parker (a major general in the United States Army and a Medal of Honor recipient for his role in the Philippine–American War during 1899), Richard Wayne Parker (also a United States Representative from New Jersey).

U.S. House of Representatives
Preceded by James F. Randolph	Member of the U.S. House of Representatives from New Jersey's at-large congressional district 1833–1837	Succeeded by Joseph F. Randolph
