= James Parker (art historian) =

American art historian

- Born: January 22, 1924; Boston, Massachusetts, US
- Died: June 20, 2001 (aged 77); Manhattan, New York, US
- Resting place: Saint Mary's Episcopal Churchyard, Portsmouth, Rhode Island, US
- Education: Harvard College
- Occupations: Curator, The Metropolitan Museum of Art
- Military career
- Service: United States Army
- Service years: 1942–1945
- Rank: Technician Fifth Grade
- Unit: 150th Field Artillery Regiment
- Conflicts: World War II
- Relatives: Cortlandt Parker (father); James Parker (1854–1934) (grandfather); Cortlandt Parker (1818–1907) (great-grandfather)

James Parker (January 22, 1924 – June 20, 2001) was an American art historian. He served for nearly three decades as a curator at The Metropolitan Museum of Art.

== Early life ==
James Parker was born in Boston, Massachusetts, on January 22, 1924, a son of Elizabeth Gray of Boston and Cortlandt Parker of Newark, New Jersey. His father was a major general in the United States Army and his paternal grandfather, James Parker, served as a general as well. His maternal grandfather, Morris Gray, had served as president of the Boston Museum of Fine Arts from 1914 to 1924. His great-grandfather, Cortlandt Parker (1818–1907) was a prominent attorney in New Jersey. Due to his father's military career, his formative years were spent on military bases including camps and forts in Vermont, England, Hawaii, and Massachusetts. Schools he attended included a day school in London, England (1931–1933), Stanmore Park in Middlesex, England (1933-1935), a day school near Fort Ethan Allen, Vermont (1936), and the Punahou School in Oahu, Hawaii (1936–1938).

Parker graduated from St. Mark's School in Southborough, Massachusetts, in 1942. He enrolled at Harvard College in 1942 to study modern European history and left in 1943 to serve in the United States Army. He served with the 150th Field Artillery Regiment, a unit of the Indiana Army National Guard's 38th Infantry Division and took part in the Pacific War of World War II. He was honorably discharged in December 1945 after twenty-two months of service, and left the service as a technician fifth grade. He returned to Harvard College in February 1946 and graduated with a degree in modern European history in 1948.

== Career ==
Parker began his career as a specialist in European decorative arts at The Metropolitan Museum of Art in 1951, was appointed assistant curator in 1954, associate curator in 1962 and curator in 1968. He was appointed Curator Emeritus in 1993, upon his retirement. Over the course of his career he developed a specialization in French and English furniture. He was once described by a colleague as a "curator's curator," who quietly inspired his associates as his duties developed and expanded. Heeding the advice of the Metropolitan's director, Francis Henry Taylor, Parker traveled abroad in 1948 to gain experience by working as an apprentice in museums across Europe. He divided the next two years interning at the Musée des Arts Décoratifs, Paris, The Louvre, Paris, and the Victoria and Albert Museum, London. In 1950, he briefly assisted at Wiesbaden Collecting Point, one of the World War II restitution archival depots for recovered art objects established in Germany by the Monuments, Fine Arts, and Archives program. During his time abroad, he studied under Pierre Verlet of the Louvre and Sir John Pope-Hennessy of the Victoria and Albert Museum.

Upon his return to the United States in 1951, Parker joined the Department of Renaissance and Modern Art (now European Sculpture and Decorative Arts) as a curatorial assistant. He was appointed assistant curator in 1954, and associate curator in 1962. In 1968, Parker was elected curator, a position he held until his retirement in 1993, when he was elected Curator Emeritus. Parker's specialization in French furnishings and interiors of the seventeenth and eighteenth centuries, earned him a guiding role in the installation of the Wrightsman Galleries, an extensive ensemble of period rooms. These spaces, including both rooms taken from historic buildings and recreations intended to show related works of decorative art in an authentic setting, reflect the encyclopedic collection of French decorative arts of two of the Museum's most significant contemporary patrons, Charles and Jayne Wrightsman. This project occupied Parker for nearly three decades, as various rooms were installed, refurbished and reinstalled. In 2007, the galleries' technical infrastructure was modernized, the lighting revamped, and the objects rearranged; yet Parker's meticulous research and work is still evident, and the galleries are among the Museum's most renowned installations.

In addition to the French period rooms, Parker supervised the installation of a number of permanent spaces devoted to English and German objects. Parker wrote numerous articles on subjects ranging from Rococo furniture to gilt-bronze ornaments, as well as assisting in the research and writing for several publications devoted to the Kress, Sheafer and Wrightsman collections. He also lectured and served as an adjunct professor at New York University.

Parker died in Manhattan on June 20, 2001. He was survived by nieces Elizabeth K. Parker and Nancy Gray Parker Wilson, and nephews Cortlandt Jr. and Stephen Ward, as well as fourteen grandnieces and nephews. He was buried in Saint Mary's Episcopal Churchyard in Portsmouth, Rhode Island.

== Additional reading ==
- Draper, James David. "A life at The Met: James Parker and the collecting of Italian furniture." Apollo, January 1993, pages 20–24.
- Dulling, Corey. "James Parker, at 77; was Met curator for 4 decades." Boston Globe, June 24, 2001, page A25.
- Johnson, Ken. "Gilding the Ancien Régime." The New York Times, November 9, 2007, page E44.
- Metropolitan Museum of Art (Manhattan, New York). Period rooms in The Metropolitan Museum of Art. New York: The Museum : H.N. Abrams, 1996.
- Metropolitan Museum of Art (Manhattan, New York). "Recent Deaths : James Parker, Curator Emeritus, European Sculpture and Decorative Arts." The biweekly: A newsletter for the Staff and Volunteers of The Metropolitan Museum of Art, July 6, 2001, page 6.
- Oral History Project interview with James Parker, August 9, 12, 19, 1994, The Metropolitan Museum of Art Archives.
- Parker, James. "J. Parker's Report on his World War II Army Service 7/3/87." Photocopy, Department of European Sculpture and Decorative Arts, Metropolitan Museum of Art, New York.
- A Guide to the Wrightsman Galleries at the Metropolitan Museum of Art. Entries by James Parker, curator and Clare LeCorbeiller, associate curator, Department of European Sculpture and Decorative Arts.
- Oral history interview with James Parker, 1994 August 9-19 from The Metropolitan Museum of Art Archives, New York.
