= 1959 New Jersey Senate election =

1959 New Jersey Senate elections
- November 3, 1959

12 of the 21 seats in the New Jersey State Senate 11 seats needed for a majority
- Turnout: 71% ▼3pp)
	Majority party	Minority party
Leader		Joseph W. Cowgill
Party	Republican	Democratic
Leader's seat		Camden
Last election	13	8
Seats before	12	7
Seats won	11	10
Seat change	▼1	▲3
Seats up	5	6
Races won	9	2
- Results by district Democratic hold Democratic gain Republican hold No election
Senate President before election
Republican
Elected Senate President
Republican

The 1959 New Jersey Senate elections were held on November 3.

The elections took place midway through the second term of Governor Robert Meyner. Eleven of New Jersey's 21 counties held regular elections for Senator; Cumberland County also held a special election to complete the unexpired term of W. Howard Sharp, who died in December 1958.

Democrats gained two seats by flipping a seat in Burlington and Gloucester counties (which was vacant), as well as holding their vacant seat in Cumberland. Democrats nearly won control of the New Jersey Senate for the first time since 1915; only 567 votes separated victorious Republican Robert C. Crane and Democrat H. Roy Wheeler in Union County.

== Incumbents not running for re-election ==
All ten incumbents ran for re-election.

== Summary of results by county ==
County	Incumbent	Party	Elected Senator	Party
Atlantic	Frank S. Farley	Rep	No election	
Bergen	Walter H. Jones	Rep	No election	
Burlington	Albert McCay	Rep	Henry S. Haines	Dem
Camden	Joseph W. Cowgill	Dem	Joseph W. Cowgill	Dem
Cape May	Charles W. Sandman	Rep	Charles W. Sandman	Rep
Cumberland	Vacant (Note: This seat was vacant following the December 1958 death of Senator W. Howard Sharp.)		Robert H. Weber	Dem
Essex	Donal C. Fox	Dem	Donal C. Fox	Dem
Gloucester	Vacant (Note: This seat was vacant following the May 1959 resignation of Senator Harold W. Hannold.)		Thomas F. Connery Jr.	Dem
Hudson	William F. Kelly Jr.	Dem	No election	
Hunterdon	Wesley Lance	Rep	No election	
Mercer	Sido Ridolfi	Dem	No election	
Middlesex	John A. Lynch	Dem	John A. Lynch	Dem
Monmouth	Richard R. Stout	Rep	Richard R. Stout	Rep
Morris	Thomas J. Hillery	Rep	No election	
Ocean	W. Steelman Mathis	Rep	No election	
Passaic	Anthony J. Grossi	Dem	No election	
Salem	John A. Waddington	Dem	John A. Waddington	Dem
Somerset	William E. Ozzard (Note: Ozzard won a 1958 special election to complete the unexpired term of Senator Malcolm Forbes, who resigned.)	Rep	William E. Ozzard	Rep
Sussex	George B. Harper	Rep	No election	
Union	Robert C. Crane (Note: Crane won a 1956 special election to complete the unexpired term of Senator Kenneth Hand, who resigned to become a Superior Court judge.)	Rep	Robert C. Crane	Rep
Warren	Wayne Dumont	Rep	Wayne Dumont	Rep

=== Close races ===
Seats where the margin of victory was under 10%:

1. Union, 0.34%
2. Gloucester, 1.54%
3. Camden, 3.44%
4. Essex, 5.88%
5. Burlington, 8.26% gain

== Burlington ==
1959 general election
Party	Candidate	Votes	%	±%
Democratic	Henry S. Haines	30,183	54.13%	
Republican	Albert McCay (incumbent)	25,575	45.87%	
Total votes		55,758	100.0%	

== Camden ==
1959 general election
Party	Candidate	Votes	%	±%
Democratic	Joseph W. Cowgill (incumbent)	61,656	51.72%	
Republican	William G. Rohrer	57,564	48.28%	
Total votes		119,220	100.0%	

== Cape May ==
1959 general election
Party	Candidate	Votes	%	±%
Republican	Charles W. Sandman (incumbent)	12,206	61.38%	
Democratic	Fred C. Barthelmess	7,679	38.62%	
Total votes		19,885	100.0%	

== Cumberland (special) ==
1959 general election
Party	Candidate	Votes	%	±%
Democratic	Robert H. Weber	17,419	56.10%	
Republican	Robert G. Howell	13,631	43.90%	
Total votes		31,050	100.0%	

== Essex ==
1959 general election
Party	Candidate	Votes	%	±%
Democratic	Donal C. Fox (incumbent)	126,800	51.11%	
Republican	Alfred C. Clapp	112,218	45.23%	
Independent	Anthony D. Scipio	7,426	2.99%	
Independent	Frank DeGeorge	1,643	0.66%	
Total votes		248,087	100.0%	

== Gloucester ==
1959 general election
Party	Candidate	Votes	%	±%
Democratic	Thomas F. Connery Jr.	23,665	50.77%	
Republican	John Joseph Kitchen	22,943	49.23%	
Total votes		46,608	100.0%	

== Middlesex ==
1959 general election
Party	Candidate	Votes	%	±%
Democratic	John A. Lynch (incumbent)	86,880	64.30%	
Republican	Fred S. Brause	48,231	35.70%	
Total votes		135,111	100.0%	

== Monmouth ==
1959 general election
Party	Candidate	Votes	%	±%
Republican	Richard R. Stout (incumbent)	54,946	57.79%	
Democratic	Thomas J. Smith	40,125	42.21%	
Total votes		95,071	100.0%	

== Salem ==
1959 general election
Party	Candidate	Votes	%	±%
Democratic	John A. Waddington (incumbent)	12,215	59.92%	
Republican	Peter B. Hoff	8,172	40.08%	
Total votes		20,387	100.0%	

== Somerset ==
1959 general election
Party	Candidate	Votes	%	±%
Republican	William E. Ozzard (incumbent)	24,120	57.03%	
Democratic	William H. Sutherland	18,175	42.97%	
Total votes		42,295	100.0%	

== Union ==
1959 general election
Party	Candidate	Votes	%	±%
Republican	Robert C. Crane (incumbent)	82,609	49.61%	
Democratic	H. Roy Wheeler	82,042	49.27%	
Independent	Frank Chodorov	1,862	1.12%	
Total votes		166,513	100.0%	

== Warren ==
1959 general election
Party	Candidate	Votes	%	±%
Republican	Wayne Dumont (incumbent)	13,366	56.73%	
Democratic	Thomas C. Swick	10,194	43.27%	
Total votes		23,560	100.0%	
