= 1955 New Jersey Senate election =

1955 New Jersey Senate elections
- November 8, 1955

10 of the 21 seats in the New Jersey State Senate 11 seats needed for a majority
- Turnout: 61% (▼9pp)
	Majority party	Minority party
Party	Republican	Democratic
Seats before	17	4
Seats won	14	7
Seat change	▼3	▲3
Seats up	9	1
Races won	6	4
- Results by district Democratic hold Democratic gain Republican hold No election
Senate President before election
Republican
Elected Senate President
Republican

The 1955 New Jersey Senate elections were held on November 8.

The elections took place midway through the first term of Governor Robert Meyner. Eleven of New Jersey's 21 counties held regular elections for Senator. The Democratic Party gained Camden, Essex and Salem counties.

== Incumbents not running for re-election ==
=== Democratic ===
- Bernard W. Vogel (Middlesex)

=== Republican ===
- James Cafiero (Cape May)
- Bruce A. Wallace (Camden)

== Summary of results by county ==
County	Incumbent	Party	Elected Senator	Party
Atlantic	Frank S. Farley	Rep	No election	
Bergen	Walter H. Jones	Rep	No election	
Burlington	Albert McCay	Rep	Albert McCay	Rep
Camden	Bruce A. Wallace	Rep	Joseph W. Cowgill	Dem
Cape May	Anthony Cafiero	Rep	Charles W. Sandman	Rep
Cumberland	W. Howard Sharp	Dem	No election	
Essex	Mark Anton (Note: Anton succeeded Senator Alfred C. Clapp, who resigned in 1953 after he was appointed to the New Jersey Superior Court.)	Rep	Donal C. Fox	Dem
Gloucester	Harold W. Hannold	Rep	Harold W. Hannold	Rep
Hudson	James F. Murray Jr.	Dem	No election	
Hunterdon	Wesley Lance	Rep	No election	
Mercer	Sido Ridolfi	Dem	No election	
Middlesex	Bernard W. Vogel	Dem	John A. Lynch Sr.	Dem
Monmouth	Richard R. Stout	Rep	Richard R. Stout	Rep
Morris	Thomas J. Hillery	Rep	No election	
Ocean	W. Steelman Mathis	Rep	No election	
Passaic	Frank W. Shershin	Rep	No election	
Salem	John M. Summerill Jr.	Rep	John A. Waddington	Dem
Somerset	Malcolm Forbes	Rep	Malcolm Forbes	Rep
Sussex	George B. Harper	Rep	No election	
Union	Kenneth Hand	Rep	Kenneth Hand	Rep
Warren	Wayne Dumont	Rep	Wayne Dumont	Rep

=== Close races ===
Seats where the margin of victory was under 10%:

1. Camden, 0.26% gain
2. Somerset, 0.94%
3. Essex, 3.35% gain
4. Salem, 6.14% gain
5. Warren, 8.00%
6. Union, 9.33%

== Burlington ==
1955 general election
Party	Candidate	Votes	%	±%
Republican	Albert McCay (incumbent)	24,219	55.77%	
Democratic	Edward J. Hulse	19,206	44.23%	
Total votes		43,425	100.0%	

== Camden ==
1955 general election
Party	Candidate	Votes	%	±%
Democratic	Joseph W. Cowgill	54,683	50.02%	
Republican	William G. Rohrer	54,393	49.76%	
Socialist Labor	Robert G. Howell	240	0.22%	
Total votes		109,316	100.0%	

== Cape May ==
1955 general election
Party	Candidate	Votes	%	±%
Republican	Charles W. Sandman	12,747	73.82%	
Democratic	William E. Sturm	4,520	26.18%	
Total votes		17,267	100.0%	

== Essex ==
=== Republican primary ===
==== Candidates ====
- Mark Anton, incumbent Senator since 1953 and founder of Suburban Propane Gas Company
- William O. Barnes, Assemblyman from South Orange

==== Campaign ====
Barnes challenged Anton and the county party establishment with a "Good Government" ticket that included four incumbent Assembly members. They were defeated in a rancorous primary, and Barnes lost by about 3,222 votes.

=== General election ===
1955 general election
Party	Candidate	Votes	%	±%
Democratic	Donal C. Fox	118,950	51.11%	
Republican	Mark Anton (incumbent)	111,141	47.76%	
Independent	James R. Golden	2,062	0.89%	
Socialist Labor	Frank DeGeorge	572	0.25%	
Total votes		232,725	100.0%	

== Gloucester ==
1955 general election
Party	Candidate	Votes	%	±%
Republican	Harold W. Hannold (incumbent)	20,658	56.75%	
Democratic	Thomas F. Connery Jr.	15,742	43.25%	
Total votes		36,400	100.0%	

== Middlesex ==
1955 general election
Party	Candidate	Votes	%	±%
Democratic	John A. Lynch	68,385	64.07%	
Republican	Joseph H. Edgar	38,356	35.93%	
Total votes		106,741	100.0%	

== Monmouth ==
1955 general election
Party	Candidate	Votes	%	±%
Republican	Richard R. Stout (incumbent)	43,889	64.09%	
Democratic	Thomas J. Smith	24,588	35.91%	
Total votes		68,477	100.0%	

== Salem ==
1955 general election
Party	Candidate	Votes	%	±%
Democratic	John A. Waddington	9,836	53.05%	
Republican	John M. Summerill Jr. (incumbent)	8,698	46.91%	
Socialist Labor	Marvin Ronis	6	0.03%	
Total votes		18,540	100.0%	

== Somerset ==
=== General election ===
==== Candidates ====
- Malcolm Forbes, incumbent Senator since 1952 and publisher of Forbes magazine
- Charles W. Engelhard Jr., president of the Engelhard Corporation

==== Campaign ====
In a race later dubbed the "Battle of the Billionaires," Malcolm Forbes narrowly defeated Charles Engelhard.

The Democratic Party targeted Forbes in an effort to stave off a challenge to Governor Meyner in 1957. Forbes, who had already run for governor in 1953 and possessed a large fortune, was expected to be able to self-fund a serious challenge to Meyner. Thus, they recruited Engelhard, a wealthy industrialist who had been a major contributor to the Democratic Party.

Although state election disclosure laws at the time did not require candidates to report spending on their own behalf, some observers as of 2013 believed this to be the most expensive state legislative contest in history. Engelhard spent freely to match Forbes. Forbes owned his own local newspaper, the Messenger Gazette, so Engelhard bought out the Somerville Star to serve as his campaign bulletin. At one point during the campaign, Engelhard reportedly campaigned by sailing his yacht down the Raritan River wearing a white naval uniform.

==== Results ====
1955 general election
Party	Candidate	Votes	%	±%
Republican	Malcolm Forbes (incumbent)	19,981	50.47%	
Democratic	Charles W. Engelhard Jr.	19,611	49.53%	
Total votes		39,592	100.0%	

Forbes survived a challenge and recount. Engelhard reportedly felt the loss was a blessing in disguise, as it allowed him to focus his efforts on his vast industrial empire. He later became the inspiration for the James Bond villain Auric Goldfinger.

Forbes ran for Governor in 1957 and secured the Republican nomination but lost to Meyner by over 200,000 votes.

== Union ==
1955 general election
Party	Candidate	Votes	%	±%
Republican	Kenneth Hand (incumbent)	67,290	54.10%	
Democratic	Robert L. Sheldon	55,689	44.77%	
Independent	Harry Mopsick	1,413	1.14%	
Total votes		124,392	100.0%	

== Warren ==
1955 general election
Party	Candidate	Votes	%	±%
Republican	Wayne Dumont (incumbent)	12,075	54.00%	
Democratic	James C. Jamieson	10,286	46.00%	
Total votes		22,361	100.0%	

== See also ==
- List of New Jersey state legislatures
