= 1951 New Jersey Senate election =

- November 6, 1951

11 out of 21 seats in the New Jersey Senate 11 seats needed for a majority
- Turnout: 59% (▼17pp)
	Majority party	Minority party
Party	Republican	Democratic
Last election	14	7
Seats after	16	5
Seat change	▲2	▼2
- Results by district Democratic hold Republican hold Republican gain No election
President of the Senate before election
Alfred B. Littell
Republican
Elected President of the Senate
Alfred B. Littell
Republican

The 1951 New Jersey Senate election was held on November 6, 1951, to determine which party would control the New Jersey Senate for the following two years in the 176th New Jersey Legislature. Eleven out of 21 seats in the New Jersey Senate were up for election, and the primary was held in April 1951. Prior to the election, 14 seats were held by Republicans, and 7 seats were held by Democrats. The general election saw Republicans expand their majority in the State Senate by 2 seats. Republicans flipped each seat in Burlington and Warren counties.

== Defeated incumbents ==
=== In primary ===
==== Republicans ====
1. Monmouth County: J. Stanley Herbert lost renomination to Richard R. Stout.
2. Somerset County: Freas L. Hess lost renomination to Malcolm Forbes.

=== In general ===
==== Democrats ====
1. Burlington County: James M. Davis Jr. lost re-election to Albert McCay.
2. Warren County: Robert B. Meyner lost re-election to Wayne Dumont.

== Summary of results by county ==
County	Incumbent	Party	Elected Senator	Party
Atlantic	Frank S. Farley	Rep	No election	
Bergen	David Van Alstyne	Rep	No election	
Burlington	James M. Davis Jr.	Dem	Albert McCay	Rep
Camden	Bruce A. Wallace	Rep	Bruce A. Wallace	Rep
Cape May	Anthony Cafiero	Rep	Anthony Cafiero	Rep
Cumberland	W. Howard Sharp	Dem	No election	
Essex	Alfred C. Clapp	Rep	Alfred C. Clapp	Rep
Gloucester	Harold W. Hannold	Rep	Harold W. Hannold	Rep
Hudson	James F. Murray Jr.	Dem	No election	
Hunterdon	Wesley Lance	Rep	No election	
Mercer	Sido Ridolfi	Dem	No election	
Middlesex	Bernard W. Vogel	Dem	Bernard W. Vogel	Dem
Monmouth	J. Stanley Herbert	Rep	Richard R. Stout	Rep
Morris	Thomas J. Hillery	Rep	No election	
Ocean	W. Steelman Mathis	Rep	No election	
Passaic	Frank W. Shershin	Rep	No election	
Salem	John M. Summerill Jr.	Rep	John M. Summerill Jr.	Rep
Somerset	Freas Hess	Rep	Malcolm Forbes	Rep
Sussex	George B. Harper	Rep	No election	
Union	Kenneth Hand	Rep	Kenneth Hand	Rep
Warren	Robert B. Meyner	Dem	Wayne Dumont	Rep

=== Closest races ===
Seats where the margin of victory was under 10%:

1. Warren County, 0.20% (gain)
2. Camden County, 7.38%
3. Salem County, 7.70%

=== Other gains ===
Seats that flipped party control where the margin of victory was over 10%:

1. Burlington, 13.70% (gain)

== Burlington County ==
=== Democratic primary ===
==== Candidates ====
- James M. Davis Jr., incumbent state senator

=== Republican primary ===
==== Candidates ====
- Louis J. Kaser
- Albert McCay, former assemblyman (1944–48)
- William F. Parker
- Clifford Ross Powell, former state senator (1928–40) and acting governor (1935)

=== General election ===
==== Candidates ====
- James M. Davis Jr., incumbent state senator (Democratic)
- Albert McCay, former assemblyman (1944–48) (Republican)

==== Results ====
Burlington County election, 1951
Party	Candidate	Votes	%
Republican	Albert McCay	20,051	56.85%
Democratic	James M. Davis Jr. (incumbent)	15,222	43.15%
Total votes		35,273	100.0%
Republican gain from Democratic			

== Camden County ==
=== General election ===
==== Candidates ====
- George F. Neutze (Democratic)
- Bruce A. Wallace, incumbent senator (Republican)

==== Results ====
Camden County election, 1951
Party	Candidate	Votes	%
Republican	Bruce A. Wallace (incumbent)	47,420	53.69%
Democratic	George F. Neutze	40,903	46.31%
Total votes		88,323	100.0%
Republican hold			

== Cape May County ==
=== General election ===
==== Candidates ====
- Anthony Cafiero, incumbent senator (Republican)
- Joseph F. Hughes (Democratic)

==== Results ====
Cape May County election, 1951
Party	Candidate	Votes	%
Republican	Anthony Cafiero (incumbent)	12,279	79.86%
Democratic	Joseph F. Hughes	3,097	20.14%
Total votes		15,376	100.0%
Republican hold			

== Essex County ==
=== General election ===
==== Candidates ====
- Alfred C. Clapp, incumbent senator (Republican)
- Ruth Lerner (Progressive)
- John A. Pindar (Democratic)

==== Results ====
Essex County election, 1951
Party	Candidate	Votes	%
Republican	Alfred C. Clapp (incumbent)	114,435	61.60%
Democratic	John A. Pindar	67,678	36.44%
Progressive	Ruth Lerner	3,637	1.96%
Total votes		185,750	100.0%
Republican hold			

== Gloucester County ==
=== General election ===
==== Candidates ====
- Harold W. Hannold, incumbent senator (Republican)
- Joseph Mennite (Democratic)

==== Results ====
Gloucester County election, 1951
Party	Candidate	Votes	%
Republican	Harold W. Hannold (incumbent)	20,046	71.60%
Democratic	Joseph Mennite	7,950	28.40%
Total votes		27,996	100.0%
Republican hold			

== Middlesex County ==
=== Democratic primary ===
==== Candidates ====
- Joseph T. Karcher
- Bernard Vogel, incumbent senator

=== General election ===
==== Candidates ====
- Walter D. Fetterly (Republican)
- Bernard Vogel, incumbent senator (Democratic)

==== Results ====
Middlesex County election, 1951
Party	Candidate	Votes	%
Democratic	Bernard W. Vogel (incumbent)	49,287	60.03%
Republican	Walter D. Fetterly	32,815	39.97%
Total votes		82,102	100.0%
Democratic hold			

== Monmouth County ==
=== Republican primary ===
- J. Stanley Herbert, incumbent senator
- Richard R. Stout, attorney and veteran

=== General election ===
==== Candidates ====
- Solomon Lautman (Democratic)
- Richard R. Stout, attorney and veteran (Republican)

==== Results ====
Monmouth County election, 1951
Party	Candidate	Votes	%
Republican	Richard R. Stout	42,261	68.74%
Democratic	Solomon Lautman	19,214	31.26%
Total votes		61,475	100.0%
Republican hold			

== Salem County ==
=== General election ===
==== Candidates ====
- James S. Sparks (Democratic)
- John M. Summerill Jr. (Republican)

==== Results ====
Salem County election, 1951
Party	Candidate	Votes	%
Republican	John M. Summerill Jr. (incumbent)	8,941	53.85%
Democratic	James S. Sparks	7,663	46.15%
Total votes		16,604	100.0%
Republican hold			

== Somerset County ==
=== Republican primary ===
==== Candidates ====
- Malcolm Forbes, publishing magnate
- Freas L. Hess, incumbent senator

=== General election ===
==== Candidates ====
- Malcolm Forbes, publishing magnate (Republican)
- Anthony P. Kearns (Democratic)

==== Results ====
Somerset County election, 1951
Party	Candidate	Votes	%
Republican	Malcolm Forbes	20,474	71.59%
Democratic	Anthony P. Kearns	8,123	28.41%
Total votes		28,597	100.0%
Republican hold			

== Union County ==
=== General election ===
==== Candidates ====
- Kenneth Hand, incumbent senator (Republican)
- J. Jerome Kaplon (Democratic)

==== Results ====
Union County election, 1951
Party	Candidate	Votes	%
Republican	Kenneth Hand (incumbent)	60,249	63.43%
Democratic	J. Jerome Kaplon	34,728	36.57%
Total votes		94,977	100.0%
Republican hold			

== Warren County ==
=== General election ===
==== Candidates ====
- Wayne Dumont, Phillipsburg attorney (Republican)
- Robert B. Meyner, incumbent senator (Democratic)

==== Results ====
Warren County election, 1951
Party	Candidate	Votes	%
Republican	Wayne Dumont	10,929	50.10%
Democratic	Robert B. Meyner (incumbent)	10,883	49.90%
Total votes		21,812	100.0%
Republican gain from Democratic			

== See also ==
- List of New Jersey state legislatures
