= 1957 New Jersey Senate election =

1957 New Jersey Senate elections
- November 5, 1957

10 of the 21 seats in the New Jersey State Senate 11 seats needed for a majority
- Turnout: 74% (▲13pp)
	Majority party	Minority party
Party	Republican	Democratic
Seats before	14	7
Seats won	13	8
Seat change	▼1	▲1
Seats up	6	3
Races won	7	4
- Results by district Democratic hold Democratic gain Republican hold No election
Senate President before election
Republican
Elected Senate President
Republican

The 1957 New Jersey Senate elections were held on November 5.

The elections coincided with the re-election of Governor Robert Meyner. Ten of New Jersey's 21 counties elected Senators. Democrats gained one seat in Passaic County, where Anthony J. Grossi unseated incumbent Republican Frank W. Shershin.

== Incumbents not running for re-election ==
=== Democratic ===
- James F. Murray Jr. (Hudson)

== Summary of results by county ==
County	Incumbent	Party	Elected Senator	Party
Atlantic	Frank S. Farley	Rep	Frank S. Farley	Rep
Bergen	Walter H. Jones	Rep	Walter H. Jones	Rep
Burlington	Albert McCay	Rep	No election	
Camden	Joseph W. Cowgill	Dem	No election	
Cape May	Charles W. Sandman	Rep	No election	
Cumberland	W. Howard Sharp	Dem	W. Howard Sharp	Dem
Essex	Donal C. Fox	Dem	No election	
Gloucester	Harold W. Hannold	Rep	No election	
Hudson	James F. Murray Jr.	Dem	William F. Kelly Jr.	Dem
Hunterdon	Wesley Lance	Rep	Wesley Lance	Rep
Mercer	Sido Ridolfi	Dem	Sido Ridolfi	Dem
Middlesex	John A. Lynch	Dem	No election	
Monmouth	Richard R. Stout	Rep	No election	
Morris	Thomas J. Hillery	Rep	Thomas J. Hillery	Rep
Ocean	W. Steelman Mathis	Rep	W. Steelman Mathis	Rep
Passaic	Frank W. Shershin	Rep	Anthony J. Grossi	Dem
Salem	John A. Waddington	Dem	No election	
Somerset	Malcolm Forbes	Rep	No election	
Sussex	George B. Harper	Rep	George B. Harper	Rep
Union	Kenneth Hand	Rep	No election	
Warren	Wayne Dumont	Rep	No election	

=== Close races ===
Seats where the margin of victory was under 10%:

1. Sussex, 8.86%
2. Cumberland, 8.92%

=== Other gains ===
Seats that flipped party control where the margin of victory was over 10%:

1. Passaic, 11.45%

== Atlantic ==
1957 general election
Party	Candidate	Votes	%	±%
Republican	Frank S. Farley (incumbent)	33,225	62.03%	
Democratic	Ernest M. Curtis	20,341	37.97%	
Total votes		53,566	100.0%	

== Bergen ==
1957 general election
Party	Candidate	Votes	%	±%
Republican	Walter H. Jones (incumbent)	153,902	57.36%	
Democratic	Louis A. D'Agosto	114,407	42.64%	
Total votes		268,309	100.0%	

== Cumberland ==
1957 general election
Party	Candidate	Votes	%	±%
Democratic	W. Howard Sharp (incumbent)	16,270	50.55%	
Republican	Charles E. Gant	13,400	41.63%	
Independent	Thomas A. Dailey	2,517	7.82%	
Total votes		32,187	100.0%	

== Hudson ==
1957 general election
Party	Candidate	Votes	%	±%
Democratic	William F. Kelley Jr.	142,518	59.69%	
Republican	Louis J. Miller	92,803	38.87%	
Independent	Julius G. Tassano	1,458	0.61%	
Independent	Arthur V. Murphy Jr.	1,270	0.53%	
Independent	Vincent A. Riley	456	0.19%	
Total votes		238,778	100.0%	

== Hunterdon ==
1957 general election
Party	Candidate	Votes	%	±%
Republican	Wesley Lance (incumbent)	10,802	59.19%	
Democratic	Franklin W. Kielb	7,447	40.81%	
Total votes		18,249	100.0%	

== Mercer ==
1957 general election
Party	Candidate	Votes	%	±%
Democratic	Sido L. Ridolfi (incumbent)	57,895	66.99%	
Republican	Fred Van Deventer	28,531	33.01%	
Total votes		86,426	100.0%	

== Morris ==
1957 general election
Party	Candidate	Votes	%	±%
Republican	Thomas J. Hillery (incumbent)	48,414	65.27%	
Democratic	F. Milton Hoth	25,764	34.73%	
Total votes		74,178	100.0%	

== Ocean ==
1957 general election
Party	Candidate	Votes	%	±%
Republican	W. Steelman Mathis (incumbent)	18,152	58.02%	
Democratic	Nathaniel H. Roth	13,136	41.98%	
Total votes		31,288	100.0%	

== Passaic ==
1957 general election
Party	Candidate	Votes	%	±%
Democratic	Anthony J. Grossi	68,515	51.76%	
Republican	Frank W. Shershin (incumbent)	53,368	40.31%	
Independent	William R. Brogan	10,495	7.93%	
Total votes		132,378	100.0%	

== Sussex ==
1957 general election
Party	Candidate	Votes	%	±%
Republican	George B. Harper (incumbent)	9,426	54.43%	
Democratic	James Dobbins	7,893	45.57%	
Total votes		17,319	100.0%	

== See also ==
- List of New Jersey state legislatures
