= 1961 New Jersey Senate election =

1961 New Jersey Senate elections
- November 5, 1961

10 of the 21 seats in the New Jersey State Senate 11 seats needed for a majority
- Turnout: 73% ▲2pp)
	Majority party	Minority party
Party	Republican	Democratic
Seats before	11	10
Seats won	11	10
Seat change	Steady	Steady
Seats up	6	4
Races won	6	4
- Results by district Democratic hold Republican hold No election
Senate President before election
William E. Ozzard
Republican
Elected Senate President
William E. Ozzard
Republican

The 1961 New Jersey Senate elections were held on November 5.

The elections took place alongside the election of Governor Richard J. Hughes. Ten of New Jersey's 21 counties elected Senators; no seats changed hands.

== Incumbents not running for re-election ==
=== Democratic ===
All four Democratic Senators up for re-election ran for another term.

=== Republican ===
- Walter H. Jones (Bergen) (ran for Governor)
- Wesley Lance (Hunterdon)

== Summary of results by county ==
County	Incumbent	Party	Elected Senator	Party
Atlantic	Frank S. Farley	Rep	Frank S. Farley	Rep
Bergen	Walter H. Jones	Rep	Pierce Deamer	Rep
Burlington	Henry S. Haines	Dem	No election	
Camden	Joseph W. Cowgill	Dem	No election	
Cape May	Charles W. Sandman	Rep	No election	
Cumberland	Robert H. Weber	Dem	Robert H. Weber	Dem
Essex	Donal C. Fox	Dem	No election	
Gloucester	Thomas F. Connery Jr.	Dem	No election	
Hudson	William F. Kelley Jr.	Dem	William F. Kelly Jr.	Dem
Hunterdon	Wesley Lance	Rep	Raymond Bowkley	Rep
Mercer	Sido Ridolfi	Dem	Sido Ridolfi	Dem
Middlesex	John A. Lynch	Dem	No election	
Monmouth	Richard R. Stout	Rep	No election	
Morris	Thomas J. Hillery	Rep	Thomas J. Hillery	Rep
Ocean	W. Steelman Mathis	Rep	W. Steelman Mathis	Rep
Passaic	Anthony J. Grossi	Dem	Anthony J. Grossi	Dem
Salem	John A. Waddington	Dem	No election	
Somerset	William E. Ozzard	Rep	No election	
Sussex	George B. Harper	Rep	George B. Harper	Rep
Union	Robert C. Crane	Rep	No election	
Warren	Wayne Dumont	Rep	No election	

=== Close races ===
Seats where the margin of victory was under 10%:

1. Ocean, 5.74%
2. Hunterdon, 5.76%
3. Cumberland, 9.27%

== Atlantic ==
1961 general election
Party	Candidate	Votes	%	±%
Republican	Frank S. Farley (incumbent)	34,949	57.93%	
Democratic	John M. Keeley	25,381	42.07%	
Total votes		60,330	100.0%	

== Bergen ==
1961 general election
Party	Candidate	Votes	%	±%
Republican	Pierce H. Deamer Jr.	160,125	55.81%	
Democratic	Fred C. Galda	124,492	43.39%	
Conservative	Irving F. Kent	1,626	0.57%	
Socialist Labor	Nathan Karp	668	0.23%	
Total votes		286,911	100.0%	

== Cumberland ==
1961 general election
Party	Candidate	Votes	%	±%
Democratic	Robert H. Weber (incumbent)	19,123	54.61%	
Republican	Carlton E. Mason	15,875	45.34%	
Socialist Labor	Walter C. Wright	18	0.05%	
Total votes		35,016	100.0%	

== Hudson ==
1961 general election
Party	Candidate	Votes	%	±%
Democratic	William F. Kelley Jr. (incumbent)	136,987	60.71%	
Republican	Norman H. Roth	86,914	38.52%	
Conservative	Clifford R. Ensslin	1,731	0.77%	
Total votes		225,632	100.0%	

== Hunterdon ==
1961 general election
Party	Candidate	Votes	%	±%
Republican	Raymond E. Bowkley	10,629	52.33%	
Democratic	Frank W. Bohren	9,458	46.57%	
Conservative	Robert W. Harris	223	1.10%	
Total votes		20,310	100.0%	

== Mercer ==
1961 general election
Party	Candidate	Votes	%	±%
Democratic	Sido L. Ridolfi (incumbent)	57,895	64.45%	
Republican	Daniel A. O'Donnell	31,929	35.55%	
Total votes		89,824	100.0%	

Remarkably, Senator Ridolfi received the same number of votes he had received in 1957.

== Morris ==
1961 general election
Party	Candidate	Votes	%	±%
Republican	Thomas J. Hillery (incumbent)	57,917	68.00%	
Democratic	Edward A. Dunbar	27,259	32.00%	
Total votes		85,176	100.0%	

== Ocean ==
1961 general election
Party	Candidate	Votes	%	±%
Republican	W. Steelman Mathis (incumbent)	22,010	52.87%	
Democratic	Albert J. Cucci	19,624	47.13%	
Total votes		41,634	100.0%	

== Passaic ==
1961 general election
Party	Candidate	Votes	%	±%
Democratic	Anthony J. Grossi (incumbent)	72,676	55.13%	
Republican	Paul G. DeMuro	58,080	44.06%	
Conservative	Charles R. Checkley	804	0.61%	
Socialist	Harry Santhouse	255	0.19%	
Total votes		131,815	100.0%	

== Sussex ==
1961 general election
Party	Candidate	Votes	%	±%
Republican	George B. Harper (incumbent)	10,670	54.95%	
Democratic	Frank A. Dolan	8,749	45.05%	
Total votes		19,419	100.0%	
