= Stamler =

Stamler is a surname. Notable people with the surname include:

- Jeremiah Stamler (1919-2022), American cardiologist
- John H. Stamler (1938–1990), American prosecutor
- Jonathan Stamler (born 1959), American physician-scientist
- Joseph Stamler (1911–1998), American judge
- Lorne Stamler (born 1951), Canadian ice hockey player
- Nelson Stamler (1909–1972), American politician, prosecutor and judge
