= Pressler =

Pressler (or Preßler) (German pronunciation: ['pʁɛslɐ]) is a German surname. Notable people with the surname include:

- Johann Valentin Pressler (or Bressler) - Immigrant from the German Palatine during the Palatine Migration of 1709. Variants of the surname among his descendants include Preslar, Presler, Pressler, with the surname Presley beginning to appear especially around the time of the American Civil War. Elvis Presley is among his descendants.
- Kimberly Pressler (born 1977), American sports reporter and former Miss USA
- Larry Pressler (born 1942), American politician
- Menahem Pressler (1923–2023), German-born Israeli-American pianist
- Mike Pressler (born 1960), American lacrosse coach
- Mirjam Pressler (1940–2019), German novelist and translator
- Paul Pressler (businessman), American business executive
- Paul Pressler (politician) (born 1930), American politician and judge
- Sylvia Pressler (1934–2010), American judge
