= William G. Rohrer =

American businessman and politician

- Born: December 15, 1909; Williamsport, Pennsylvania, U.S.
- Died: September 23, 1989 (aged 79); New Jersey, U.S.
- Occupation(s): Businessman and politician
- Spouses: Floretta Tulk (m. 1942, divorced) Mimi (m. 1982)
- Children: 5

William G. Rohrer II (December 15, 1909 – September 23, 1989) was an American businessman and Republican Party politician. He was the founder and chairman of the First Peoples Bank of New Jersey, the first bank in South Jersey to attain $1 billion in deposits. He served as the first Mayor of Haddon Township, New Jersey, from 1951 to 1987, for 36 years.

== Early life and family ==
He was born on December 15, 1909, in Williamsport, Pennsylvania. He married Floretta Tulk in 1942; the couple had four daughters, Wilma Abrams, Linda Rohrer, Carol Moss and Eileen Rohrer. The marriage ended in divorce. Roher married Mimi in 1982, the couple had an adopted son, William G. Rohrer 3d.

In 1984 his wife went to trial on charges of murdering the couple's adopted 2-year-old son. The trial ended with a hung jury.

In the 1980s his businesses suffered financial losses and his political popularity waned.

== Business career ==
His first jobs were working in his father's grocery store and at the small car dealership his father started in Pottsville, Pennsylvania, in the late 1920s. In 1929 Roher's father moved the car dealership, the Rohrer Chevrolet Agency, to Camden, New Jersey, to take advantage of an economic boom in South Jersey. He became owner of the dealership after his father's death in 1935, making his fortune by growing it into one of the largest in the nation by 1947.

In 1955, Rohrer bought a small bank in South Jersey that held $2.9 million in deposits. He renamed it First Peoples Bank and under his ownership, it became one of the largest in the area. By 1970 it had more than $100 million in deposits; by the early 1980s, it had become the first billion-dollar bank in South Jersey.

== Political career ==
Rohrer served as a township committeeman from 1947 to 1951, and as Mayor of Haddon Township, New Jersey, from 1951 to 1987. He was a commissioner on the Delaware River Port Authority. He was also a member of the Camden County Ethics Committee.

In the 1950s, Rohrer ran two close races for the New Jersey State Senate, losing twice to Democrat Joseph W. Cowgill. In 1955, Rohrer ran for an open State Senate seat when Bruce A. Wallace retired. In a close race, Cowgill defeated Rohrer by 290 votes, 54,683 (50.02%) to 54,393 (49.76%). Rohrer again faced Cowgill when he sought re-election in 1959; this time, Cowgill won by 4,092 votes, 61,656 (51.72%) to 57,564 (48.28%).

Rohrer owned a Chevrolet dealership in Camden and several other businesses, and operated several banks. The Rohrer Charitable Foundation has contributed over $12 million to Rowan University, where the College of Business was named the William G. Rohrer College of Business.

== Death and legacy ==
In ill health, Rohrer was defeated as Mayor of Haddon Township, New Jersey, in 1987. He died on September 23, 1989.

In his will, Rohrer left millions of dollars to charity, including funds designated for donations to William G. Rohrer Memorial Library, the Little League, Bancroft School for the handicapped in Haddonfield, Camden County Leukemia Society, Camden County Planned Parenthood Association, American Diabetes Association, Arthritis Foundation, Masonic Charities of New Jersey, and also funds for a new wing at the Masonic Home in Burlington Township, to Camden's Cooper Hospital Foundation, the Bible Presbyterian Church of Collingswood, Grace Baptist Church of Westmont, the Calvary Baptist Church of West Collingswood, the Emmanuel United Methodist Church of Oaklyn, and Rhoades Temple United Methodist Church of Haddon Township. His papers are archived at the University of Michigan.
