= Hettich =

Hettich is a German surname. Notable people with the surname include:

- Ernest L. Hettich (1897–1973), American academic
- Georg Hettich (born 1978), German Nordic combined skier
- Urban Hettich (born 1953), West German Nordic combined skier

== Businesses ==
- Hettich (company)
