= Senator McCay =

Senator McCay may refer to:

- Albert McCay (1901–1969), New Jersey State Senate
- Daniel McCay (fl. 2010s–present), Utah State Senate
