= Thomas Mathis =

Thomas Mathis may refer to:

- Thomas Mathis (sport shooter), Austrian sports shooter
- Thomas A. Mathis, American politician and racketeer
