= Senator Hand =

Senator Hand may refer to:

- Augustus C. Hand (1803–1878), New York State Senate
- Kenneth Hand (1899–1988), New Jersey State Senate
