= Caucus system =

Rule utilized by Republicans

The caucus system was a practice by the Republican Party in the New Jersey State Senate between 1949 and 1974 which prevented floor votes on any bill which lacked the support of a majority of members of the majority caucus. The practice, used by the Republican majority, resulted in legislative decisions made in virtual secrecy in private party caucus meetings attended only by the Senators of the majority party.

== History ==
Following the 1961 elections, Republicans held a narrow 11–10 majority, meaning that the caucus system would permit six Republican senators to block any bill from a floor vote, even if the bill had the support of 15 senators. Governor Richard J. Hughes opposed the caucus system, which effectively prevented a small number of Republican senators from joining together with the Democratic minority to support any of the Governor's legislative initiatives.

In March 1962, Senator Robert C. Crane, resigned due to terminal cancer, leaving the Senate evenly divided for nine months. The special election to fill the seat (and thereby control the Senate) attracted considerable statewide attention, and the caucus system became an issue in the campaign. Democratic nominee H. Roy Wheeler campaigned on eliminating the rule. Wheeler lost the election to Republican assemblyman Nelson Stamler, and the practice of senatorial courtesy continued.

In 1965, Democrats won control of the Senate. Hughes ally John A. Lynch Sr. was elected Senate president, and the caucus system was abolished. However, Republicans won back control of the Senate in 1967 and reinstated the caucus system.

In 1973, Democrats won a 29–10 majority (with one independent), and Senate president Frank J. Dodd and majority leader Matthew Feldman eliminated the caucus system.

== See also ==
- Hastert rule, a similar rule in the United States House of Representatives
- Senatorial courtesy (New Jersey), for another unwritten rule of the New Jersey Senate
