= Bruce Wallace =

Bruce Wallace may refer to:

- Bruce A. Wallace (1905–1977), American politician in the New Jersey Senate
- B. Alan Wallace (born 1950), American author and expert on Tibetan Buddhism
- Bruce Wallace (geneticist) (1920–2015), American scientist
