= Senatorial courtesy (New Jersey) =

Unwritten rule in the New Jersey Senate

Senatorial courtesy is an unwritten rule practiced in New Jersey Senate, under which a senator can block consideration of a nomination by the Governor of New Jersey, where the nominee is from the Senator's home county or district. Where a nominee has not received "courtesy" from a relevant senator, their nomination will not be considered. Senators may withhold courtesy out of outright opposition to a nomination or to gain political leverage for other priorities. While the practice is infrequently invoked, it has brought criticism and calls for legislation that would forbid its use.

Prior to 1967, the New Jersey Senate had one member from each of the state's 21 counties, making determinations of jurisdiction for senatorial courtesy simple.

== History and criticism ==
=== Grover Richman case ===
In 1958, Albert McCay of Burlington County blocked the renomination of Grover C. Richman for a second term as New Jersey Attorney General by Governor Robert B. Meyner. Although Richman was already serving as Attorney General, McCay refused to explain why he was unwilling to allow the nomination to proceed, stating that he would only disclose his justifications if he was granted subpoena power to compel the testimony of uncooperative witnesses who would be able to confirm his claims. Despite sharp criticism from Meyner, McCay held firm, and the Republican Senate supported him. Richman withdrew his name from consideration.

=== 1973 reforms ===
Following the 1973 elections, which resulted in a Democratic majority of 29–10 (with one independent), Senate President Frank J. Dodd and majority leader Matthew Feldman moved to eliminate the caucus system and senatorial courtesy. The caucus system ended permanently, but a faction of the Democratic majority led by James P. Dugan, the incumbent Democratic state chair, teamed with Republican senators to continue the practice of senatorial courtesy.

=== Marianne Espinosa Murphy case and reform ===
In 1993, John Dorsey of Morris County blocked the renomination of Superior Court judge Marianne Espinosa Murphy, the wife of county prosecutor Michael Murphy, by Governor Jim Florio. Despite endorsements of Murphy by the New Jersey State Bar Association and custodian advocacy groups, Dorsey indicated he had received complaints that Murphy "giggles and throws pencils on the desk during testimony". Dorsey's invocation of senatorial courtesy against the wife of a political opponent was controversial, leading to six months of debate over the practice. He eventually relented and stated that he would approve Murphy's appointment to a new, untenured seven-year term, but Murphy declined on the grounds that Dorsey posed a threat to judicial independence. In the interim, Florio made appointed another judge to Murphy's seat. In a ruling issued on December 23, 1993, the New Jersey Supreme Court deadlocked on the constitutionality of senatorial courtesy. The vote was 3–3, with Chief Justice Robert Wilentz recusing himself, because he had made a statement that opposed its use in the case of judge Marianne Espinosa Murphy. Justice Stewart G. Pollock wrote, "As vital as judicial independence is to a democracy, non-tenured judges do not enjoy an unqualified right to reappointment. Distressing though it may be, senatorial courtesy remains a prerogative of the Senate."

As a result of the controversy, Mendham attorney Chris Christie launched an unsuccessful primary challenge against Dorsey; Christie was disqualified after his petition signatures were challenged. Despite securing the Republican nomination in the heavily Republican seat, Dorsey lost the general election in an upset to Gordon MacInnes. After Dorsey's defeat, Senate president Donald DiFrancesco amended the practice of senatorial courtesy so as not to apply to any sitting judge renominated by the Governor.

=== Criticisms and opposition ===
Opinion polls conducted by the Newark Star-Ledger and the Eagleton Institute of Politics in 1983 and 1986 found that a majority of New Jerseyans opposed the practice, with only 28 percent supporting it in either year.

In a 2014 opinion piece published in The Record, senator Kevin J. O'Toole wrote, "Over the span of six decades, [senatorial courtesy] has morphed into a tool sometimes used as a bargaining chip in bitter partisan battles." O'Toole called for reform of the practice, saying, "Ultimately, the political desires of 40 members of the Senate should not outweigh the needs of 8 million New Jerseyans."

== Other historical examples ==
- In 1959, Walter H. Jones of Bergen County blocked the nomination of Ned J. Parsekian as Director of Motor Vehicles by Meyner. Parsekian served as acting director for three years until Pierce H. Deamer Jr., Jones' successor and political rival, consented to the nomination. Governor Richard J. Hughes nominated Parsekian to the New Jersey Superior Court in 1964, but Deamer refused to sign off and the nomination was withdrawn.
- In 1981, James Wallwork of Essex County blocked the nomination of Joel Jacobson to the New Jersey Casino Control Commission by governor Brendan Byrne. Jacobson circumvented senatorial courtesy by moving to Ocean County, where Democratic senator John F. Russo signed off, allowing Jacobson to be confirmed by the Democratic-controlled Senate.
- In 1983, Gerald Cardinale of Bergen County blocked the renomination of Superior Court judge Sylvia Pressler by Governor Thomas Kean. Cardinale cited his disagreement with many of Pressler's judicial rulings during the previous seven years. However, Senate president Carmen A. Orechio revoked Cardinale's ability to block the nomination, citing the fact that Cardinale had previously appeared before Judge Pressler in a legal matter, and her nomination was approved.
- In 2004, Anthony Bucco of Morris County blocked four nominations to the New Jersey Highlands Commission until he was given a meeting with Bradley M. Campbell, commissioner of the New Jersey Department of Environmental Protection, to register his concern that the Highlands Water Protection and Planning Act would limit development in the Highlands. He dropped his opposition to the nominations after Campbell met with him, Senator Guy R. Gregg, and the mayors of several municipalities in Morris County. Bucco said, "All I wanted was my day in court".
- In 2006, Nia Gill of Essex County threatened to use senatorial courtesy to block a broad range of nominees from her home county to gain leverage for a needle exchange program aimed at controlling the spread of HIV. In June 2007, Gill invoked senatorial courtesy to block the nomination of Stuart Rabner as chief justice of the New Jersey Supreme Court by Governor Jon Corzine. Rabner's nomination had been considered likely, but hearings that had been scheduled by the Senate Judiciary Committee to consider Rabner were postponed until Gill signed off on the nomination.

== See also ==
- Senatorial courtesy, for the similar unwritten rule of the United States Senate
- Caucus system, for another unwritten rule of the New Jersey Senate abolished in 1974
