= Andrew Ruotolo =

American politician

Andrew Keogh Ruotolo II
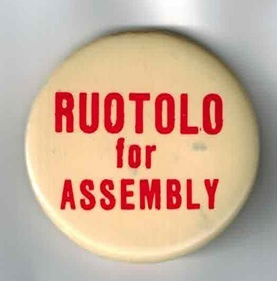
- Ruotolo Campaign Button from 1985

Union County, New Jersey Prosecutor
- In office 1992–1995
- Preceded by: John H. Stamler
- Succeeded by: Edward M. Neafsey (acting)

Personal details
- Born: November 5, 1952 Westfield, New Jersey
- Died: September 21, 1995 (aged 42) Westfield, New Jersey
- Spouse: Mary Picaro
- Relations: Dr. Joseph W. Vollmerhausen (step-father)
- Children: Lyndsay, Andrew and Jayne
- Parent(s): Claire E. Murphy; Dr. Andrew Keogh Ruotolo Sr.
- Education: Amherst College (1974); Fordham University Law School (1978)

Andrew Keogh Ruotolo II (November 5, 1952 – September 21, 1995) was an American politician who served as the Union County, New Jersey, prosecutor. He established the Union County Human Relations Commission that fought against hate crimes in the county. In 1992 he formed the Essex-Union County Auto Theft Task Force which led to a 20% reduction in motor vehicle thefts in the Newark, New Jersey, metropolitan area. He served as an Assistant United States Attorney for the District of New Jersey from 1981 to 1984.

== Biography ==
He was born in Westfield, New Jersey, on November 5, 1952, to Claire E. Murphy and Dr. Andrew Keogh Ruotolo Sr., a psychiatrist.

While at Westfield High School, he was named to the All-America swimming team. He was a 1974 graduate of Amherst College and a 1978 graduate of Fordham University Law School. He served as an Assistant United States Attorney for the District of New Jersey from 1981 to 1984, where he worked in the Criminal Division.

In 1985, he was the Democratic candidate for the New Jersey General Assembly in the Union County-based 21st Legislative District, losing to incumbent Republican Assemblymen Chuck Hardwick and Peter J. Genova by more than 14,000 votes.

Governor Jim Florio appointed him to serve as Prosecutor in 1991, following the death of John H. Stamler.

As the Union County, New Jersey, prosecutor he created the Union County Human Relations Commission to combat bias and hate crimes, and established his office's first full-time Domestic Violence Unit and the Union County Child Advocacy Center.

In 1992 he proposed the Essex-Union County Auto Theft Task Force with James F. Mulvihill, the Essex County, New Jersey, prosecutor. On the motor vehicle theft problem he said: "You have impoverished youth growing up in a society that measures your value by what kind of car you drive ... these youngsters have the ability to steal expensive cars that they feel gives them instant status in their community ... you give me 100 [new jail] beds and I'll cut the car theft problem in Newark in half".

The task force made hundreds of arrests for motor vehicle theft. This led to a 20 percent reduction in motor vehicle thefts in the Newark, New Jersey, metropolitan area.

In 1995 he founded the Union County Child Advocacy Center, in Elizabeth, as a shelter for victims of child abuse.

He was diagnosed with cancer in March 1995. On the subject he said: "Being with a child at a school concert becomes more important than sitting at a dinner table with the governor, especially for a public person." He died of esophageal cancer on September 21, 1995, in Westfield, New Jersey.

== Legacy ==
The New Jersey County Prosecutor's Association has created the Andrew K. Ruotolo, Jr. Memorial Scholarship, a need-based scholarship for students admitted to law school.

His widow, Mary P. Ruotolo, served as a Union County Freeholder from 1998 to 2004. He had three children with his wife Mary: Lyndsay, Andrew Keogh Ruotolo III, and Jayne.
