= Nelson Stamler =

American politician

Nelson F. Stamler
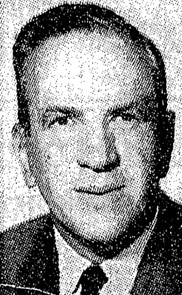

Member of the New Jersey State Senate
- In office November 19, 1962 – January 9, 1968
- Preceded by: Robert C. Crane
- Succeeded by: Multi-member district
- Constituency: Union County (1962–1966); District 9 (1966–1968)

Member of the New Jersey General Assembly from Union County
- In office January 12, 1960 – November 19, 1962
- Preceded by: George M. Miller
- Succeeded by: Multi-member district

Deputy Attorney General of New Jersey
- In office 1947–1963
- Succeeded by: Albert M. Ash, Edward Gaulkin

Personal details
- Born: May 4, 1909 Elizabeth, New Jersey
- Died: April 11, 1972 (aged 62) Montego Bay, Jamaica
- Spouse(s): Gertrude Aronowitz, Barbara Weinberg Cohen (1968-1972)
- Relations: Judge Joseph Stamler (Brother) Millicent Metzger (Sister)
- Children: John H. Stamler, Nancy Stamler, Judy Stamler
- Education: University of West Virginia (1932)

Nelson Frank Stamler (May 4, 1909 – April 11, 1972) was an American Republican Party politician, prosecutor and judge. He won considerable fame in the 1950s as a racket-busting Deputy state Attorney General who waged a war on illegal gambling operations. His work was also controversial, and eventually terminated by the state Attorney General. He later won elections to the State Assembly and State Senate and served as a Superior Court Judge.

== Early life, education and family ==
Stamler was born on May 4, 1909, in Elizabeth, the son of Samuel Stamler and Jeanette Frank Stamler, both Austrian immigrants. He had a sister, Millicent, and a brother, Joseph Stamler, who served as a New Jersey Superior Court Judge. He was a 1932 graduate of the University of West Virginia, where he was a member of a Jewish fraternity, Phi Sigma Delta. He received his law degree from Rutgers University Law School in 1933. He married Gertrude Aronwitz on June 3, 1933, in New York City; they remained married until her death in 1966. They had three children: John H. Stamler, who later served as the Union County Prosecutor; Jane and Nancy. His second wife, Barbara, survived him. From 1933 to 1947, and again from 1953 to 1967, Stamler practiced law in Elizabeth.

== Racket-busting prosecutor ==
In 1947, Governor Alfred E. Driscoll appointed him to serve as Deputy Attorney General of New Jersey, working under Attorney General Walter D. Van Riper. He became well known as a "racket buster" in the 1950s when he led a war on illegal gambling operations. He won over 40 convictions and led hundreds of raids throughout the state. He was a strong advocate of wiretapping by law enforcement, especially as a means to fight illegal gambling operations.

Harold John Adonis, a former aide to Governor Driscoll, was accused of taking a $228,000 bribe to provide "state protection" for several gamblers, including Willie Moretti, who was murdered in Cliffside Park. Driscoll fired him in 1949, and Adonis fled to The Netherlands forcing New Jersey law enforcement officials to initiate extradition proceedings. Stamler said that Adonis, in a letter to him, identified others connected to the alleged bribe. Stamler was fired the following day.

== Ouster as Deputy Attorney General ==
On January 27, 1953, Attorney General Theodore D. Parsons fired Stamler for "irresponsible and insubordinate actions."

In firing Stamler, Parsons said that he had made baseless statements to the press, including: claims that he had evidence of crime on the New Jersey waterfront but not actually turning any of the evidence over to prosecutor handling that matter; public statements that his claim of evidence in the Moretti murder was never turned over to the New Jersey State Police; false statements that he was removed from the Moretti case (Parsons said Stamler was never assigned the case); and his refusal to cooperate with another Deputy Attorney General despite a public statement that he would. Parsons also charged that Stamler provided information to a news broadcaster concerning matters pending before a Grand Jury in Bergen County, and that he was interfering with the extradition of Harold Adonis.

There were accusations that the brother of a defendant in one of Stamler's gambling cases approached New Jersey Republican State Chairman John J. Dickerson and asked him to get Trenton to back off. Stamler later testified that Dickerson had received gifts from Max Stark (identified as a check casher for a gambling syndicate), according to records he obtained from a liquor distributor. He alleged that Dickerson "abused and slandered him" in order to get Stamler out of the Bergen County investigations. He also charged that Parsons and Dickerson told conflicting stories to a Grand Jury, and said that Dickerson seemed too know more about Adonis than he did.

Following a public outcry, including criticism of Parsons by a Grand Jury in Bergen County, the State Senate and General Assembly voted to create a Joint Legislative Committee to investigate the Attorney General's firing of Stamler. After a seven-month investigation, the majority of the committee voted to uphold Parson's actions, while a minority report criticized Parsons.

Robert B. Meyner, the Democratic candidate for Governor, criticized the legislative action, saying that Stamler was "the victim of what might be called a drumhead court-martial, and questioned why the panel failed to disclose why they had not exposed links between underworld figures and New Jersey political leaders. A few days before the election, Stamler endorsed Meyner, saying the defeat of GOP candidate Paul Troast "and his circle of selfish bosses" was in the best interests of the state Republican Party. Stamler also said he would vote for all other Republican candidates in Union County.

== New Jersey Assemblyman ==
Stamler made his first bid for public office in 1957, seeking the Republican nomination for the New Jersey General Assembly. While considered the front runner for the nomination, he wound up losing the primary to Irene Griffin, a former Assemblywoman and a perennial candidate, by a margin of less than 100 votes.

He made a second bid for Assemblyman in 1959, the only Republican to win an Assembly seat in Union County that year. Stamler received the most votes, defeating incumbent Democrat George M. Miller by more than 4,000 votes. He was re-elected to a second term in 1961. He received the most votes again and was the only Republican to win; this time his margin was more than 5,000 votes.

== New Jersey State Senator ==
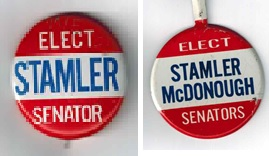
Pins from Stamler's campaigns for New Jersey State Senate in 1962 (left) and 1965.

In 1962, State Senator Robert C. Crane died of cancer at the age of 41, creating a special election to fill his vacant Senate seat. With the State Senate evenly divided at ten Republicans and ten Democrats, the Special Election would determine control of the upper house. Stamler became a candidate for State Senator. He easily won the Republican Primary, defeating his 1957 opponent, former Assemblywoman Irene Griffin, by a margin of nearly 3-1, 17,846 to 6,300. In the General Election, Stamler faced former Linden Mayor H. Roy Wheeler, who had come within 567 votes of beating Crane three years earlier.

Because control of the Senate was at stake, the race between Stamler and Wheeler attracted considerable attention from statewide officials. Richard J. Hughes, who was in his first year as Governor, became heavily invested in the campaign. With a Democratic-controlled State Assembly, Hughes needed control of the Senate to advance his legislative agenda. Senate Republicans had a rule, known as the Caucus System, that no bill could advance to the floor for a vote unless a majority of the majority caucus supported it. Democrats had advocated a rule change.

Both of New Jersey's United States Senators, Republican Clifford P. Case and Democrat Harrison A. Williams, campaigned actively for their party's Senate candidates. Case and Williams were both from Union County.

In October, Hughes accused Stamler of raising money from the New Jersey Homebuilders Association, which opposed the expansion of anti-discrimination housing laws. Stamler had attended a fundraiser at the Short Hills home of a prominent builder, Louis R. Barba. Stamler said that the New Jersey Democratic State Committee had also solicited funds from the Homebuilders Association. Wheeler sought to make Civil Rights an issue in his legislative race, saying that Stamler was an opponent of Civil Rights and that the Caucus System served to block Civil Rights legislation. Stamler said that he was the sponsor of a bill that advocated fair housing in the State Assembly.

The New York Times noted the highly negative tone of the Senate race: "The campaign has veered sharply in the last two weeks into a vitriolic struggle with attempts at character assassination overshadowing all other issues."

The race turned out to be not all that close, with Stamler winning by 7,230 votes, 96,171 to 88,941 (52%-48%).

Stamler was re-elected to a second term in the State Senate in 1963, defeating his Democratic opponent, three-term Assemblyman James M. McGowan, by 16,006 votes (55%-45%).

He had to run again in 1965 after the U.S. Supreme Court, in Reynolds v. Sims (more commonly known as One Man, One Vote), required redistricting by state legislatures for congressional districts to keep represented populations equal, as well as requiring both houses of state legislatures to have districts drawn that contained roughly equal populations, and to perform redistricting when needed. Because of its population, Union County gained a second Senate seat. Stamler ran with Assemblyman Peter J. McDonough (R-Plainfield); they were opposed by Assemblywoman Mildred Barry Hughes (D-Union Township) and William P. Hourihan of Elizabeth, a top executive of Standard Oil Company/Esso. Governor Hughes was re-elected in a landslide and brought with him majorities in both houses of the Legislature. Mildred Barry Hughes became the first woman to serve in the State Senate, edging out McDonough by a little more than 2,000 votes. But Stamler won decisively, out-polling Hourihan by more than 18,000 votes.

== Candidacy for Governor of New Jersey ==
In March 1965, Stamler announced that he was considering a bid for the Republican nomination for Governor of New Jersey. He said he would run if he would win the endorsements of some key Republican County Chairman and if he could raise the necessary campaign funds. He directly criticized the front runner, State Senator Wayne Dumont, Jr. (R-Warren), saying that the Republicans needed a candidate who opposed a state sales tax (which Dumont supported) and who opposed the court-mandated legislative redistricting. Stamler was unable to secure the endorsements, and instead backed another Senate colleague, Charles W. Sandman, Jr. Dumont served on the 1953 Joint Legislative Commission that investigated Stamler's termination as Deputy Attorney General and voted to uphold Stamler's firing. Dumont defeated Sandman 50%-47% in the GOP primary. Instead, he successfully campaigned for re-election to the State Senate.

== Rat Finks Investigation ==
The Rat Finks were an ultra-conservative faction within the New Jersey Young Republicans that were accused of being racist and anti-Semitic. During one of the group's national conventions in Wildwood, a delegate complained that the group had issued a songbook with lyrics to popular songs that were derogatory toward Black people and Jewish people. Stamler charged that the group had discouraged Black and Jewish people from joining, and asked New Jersey Attorney General Arthur J. Sills to launch an investigation. The Republican State Chairman, Webster Todd, also launched an investigation. The state Young Republican Chairman, Peter Butler (of Union County) accused Stamler of seeking to smear the right wing of the Republican Party. Richard Plechner, a New Jersey resident, was forced to resign his post as National Young Republican Vice Chairman as a result of the controversy.

== New Jersey Superior Court Judge ==
Stamler did not seek re-election to the State Senate in 1967. After the election, Hughes appointed Stamler to serve as a Union County Court Judge. The State Senate confirmed his nomination unanimously. He was reappointed to the bench by Governor William T. Cahill.

== Death ==
Stamler died on April 11, 1972, while vacationing with his wife at the Harmony House Hotel in Montego Bay, Jamaica. The cause of death was Uraemia due to liver failure and a perforated Dusdenal Ulcer. He is buried at B'nai Israel Cemetery in Newark, New Jersey.

== Electoral history ==
Office	Year	Republican	Votes	Democrat	Votes
State Assembly	1959	Nelson F. Stamler	82,465	George M. Miller	78,179
State Assembly	1961	Nelson F. Stamler	93,538	Jerome Krueger	88,467
State Senate	1962	Nelson F. Stamler	118,834	H. Roy Wheeler	85,131
State Senate	1963	Nelson F. Stamler	94,820	James M. McGowan	78,814
State Senate	1965	Nelson F. Stamler	99,327	William P. Hourihan	81,226
