= Hastert rule =

Informal governing principle used in the US Congress

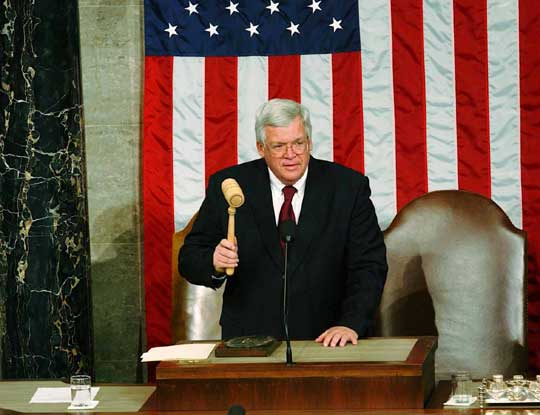
Dennis Hastert explicitly adopted the majority of the majority rule after becoming Speaker of the House.

The Hastert rule, also known as the "majority of the majority" rule, is an informal governing principle used in the United States by Republican Speakers of the House of Representatives since the mid-1990s to maintain their speakerships and limit the power of the minority party to bring bills up for a vote on the floor of the House. Under the doctrine, the speaker will not allow a floor vote on a bill unless a majority of the majority party supports the bill.

The Speaker usually has de facto control over floor votes on pending legislation (via the United States House Committee on Rules). The Hastert rule says that the speaker will not allow a floor vote on any bill that does not have majority support within their party—even if the majority of the members of the House would vote to pass it. The rule keeps the minority party from passing bills with the assistance of a minority of majority party members. In the House, 218 votes are needed to pass a bill; if 200 Democrats are the minority and 235 Republicans are the majority, the Hastert rule would not allow 200 Democrats and 100 Republicans together to pass a bill, because 100 Republican votes is short of a majority of the majority party, so the speaker would not allow a vote to take place.

The Hastert rule is an informal rule and the speaker is not bound by it; they may break it at their discretion. Speakers have at times broken the Hastert rule and allowed votes to be scheduled on legislation that lacked majority support within the Speaker's own party. Dennis Hastert alleged the rule was "kind of a misnomer" in that it "never really existed" as a rule.

== Origins ==
The Hastert rule's introduction is credited to former House speaker Dennis Hastert; however, Newt Gingrich, who directly preceded Hastert as speaker (1995–1999), followed the same rule. The notion of the rule arose out of a debate in 2006 over whether Hastert should bring an immigration reform bill to the House floor after it had been passed by the Senate. "It was pretty obvious at that point that it didn't have the votes to move it out, especially in the Judiciary Committee," he said later. "It was pretty well stacked with people who weren't willing to move."

== Speakers' views and uses of the policy ==
- Tip O'Neill (Speaker from 1977 to 1987): According to John Feehery, a Hastert aide and speechwriter who coined the term "majority of the majority", O'Neill let the Republicans "run the floor" because he did not have the votes and because he believed that if he gave President Ronald Reagan "enough rope, he would end up strangling himself".
- Tom Foley (1989–1995): In 2004, Foley said, "I think you don't want to bring bills to the floor that a majority of your party is opposed to routinely but sometimes when a great issue is at stake, I think you need to do that."
- Newt Gingrich (1995–1999): Although the majority-of-the-majority rule had not been articulated at the time, Gingrich followed it in practice.
- Dennis Hastert (1999–2007): In 2003 Hastert said, "On occasion, a particular issue might excite a majority made up mostly of the minority. Campaign finance is a particularly good example of this phenomenon. [But] the job of speaker is not to expedite legislation that runs counter to the wishes of the majority of his majority." During his speakership, he broke the Hastert Rule a dozen times. In mid-2013 he said, "If you start to rely on the minority to get the majority of your votes, then all of a sudden you're not running the shop anymore." Later that year, Hastert said, "The Hastert Rule never really existed. It's a non-entity as far as I'm concerned." Reflecting on his time as speaker, he said, "This wasn't a rule. I was speaking philosophically at the time.... The Hastert Rule is kind of a misnomer."
- Nancy Pelosi (2007–2011, 2019–2023): In 2003 Pelosi, then the House Minority leader under Speaker Hastert, decried the Hastert rule as a partisan attempt to marginalize elected members of the Democratic Party in Congress. In May 2007 Pelosi said, "I'm the Speaker of the House...I have to take into consideration something broader than the majority of the majority in the Democratic Caucus." She also said at that time, "I would encourage my colleagues not to be proposing resolutions that say 'the majority of the majority does this or that.' We have to talk it out, see what is possible to get a job done. And as I say, we do that together." Pelosi's former chief of staff, George Crawford, expanded upon this saying, "On the larger issue of the 'majority of the majority,' she has talked about that for quite a while. She does want the minority party to engage in the legislative process... That's the kind of Speakership she wants."
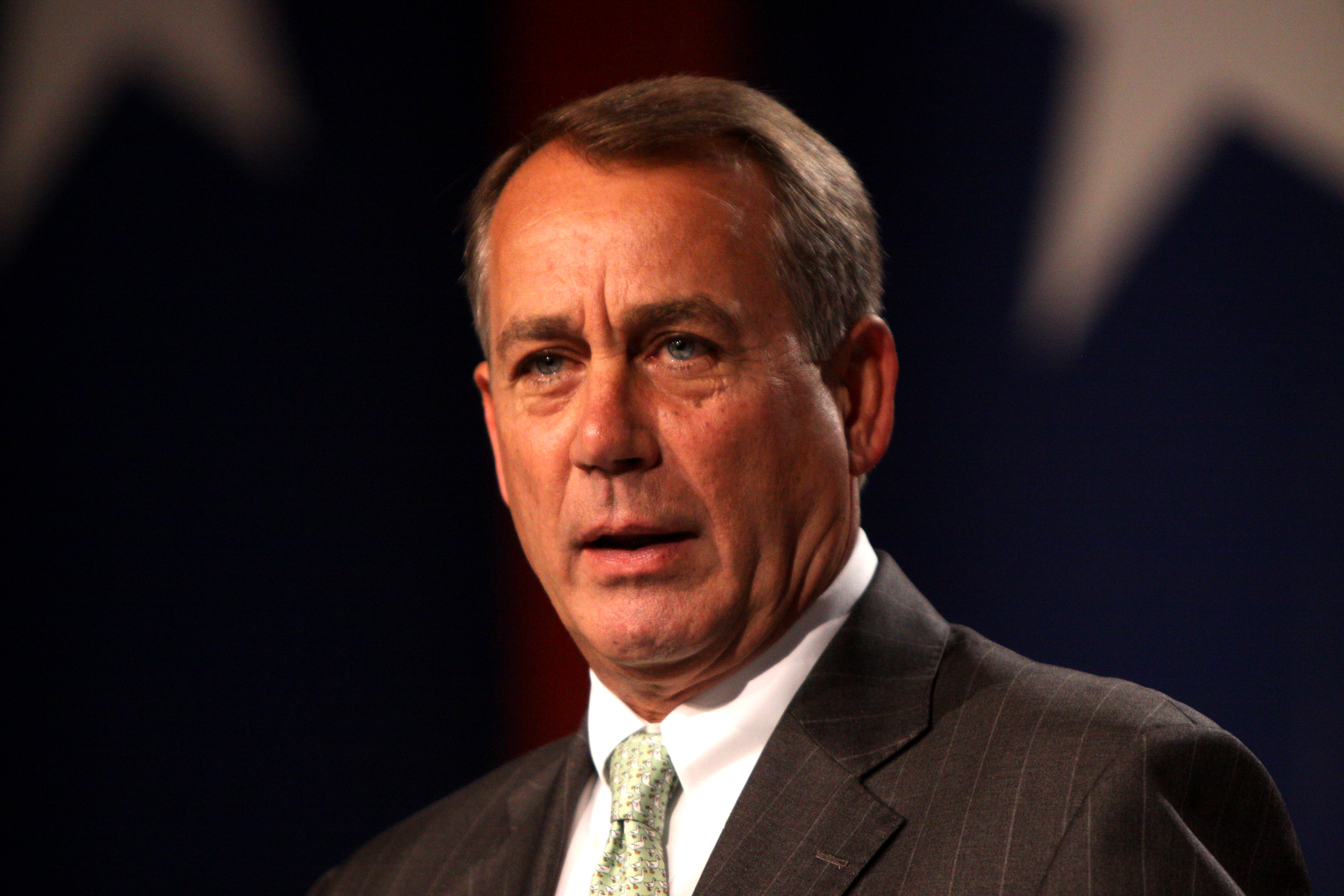
- Speaker John Boehner violated the Hastert rule at least six times.
  John Boehner (2011–2015):
  - In December 2012 Boehner told his caucus in a conference call, "I'm not interested in passing something with mostly Democrat votes" and that did not have the support of the majority of the Republican caucus. Nonetheless, Boehner allowed a vote on January 1, 2013, on the American Taxpayer Relief Act of 2012 (also known as the "fiscal cliff bill") with only 85 out of 241 Republicans in favor (a support level of only 35%) and the bill passed with the support of 90% of Democrats (172 out of 191). The bill's passage marked the first time in more than ten years that a measure passed a Republican-controlled House when opposed by a majority of House Republicans. In response, former House Speaker Hastert criticized Boehner for not adhering to the "majority of the majority" governing principle by saying, "Maybe you can do it once, maybe you can do it twice, but when you start making deals when you have to get Democrats to pass the legislation, you are not in power anymore."
  - Two weeks later, on January 15, 2013, Boehner allowed a vote on aid to victims of Hurricane Sandy to take place without the support of a majority of the Republican caucus. The vote passed with 241 votes, but only 49 of the votes were from Republicans or a mere 21% of the majority. Since then some notable Republicans have publicly questioned whether the "majority of the majority" rule is still viable or have proposed jettisoning it altogether.
  - In spite of all the criticism, on February 28, 2013, Boehner brought a third bill for a vote on the floor of the house which did not have support of majority of Republicans. The bill, an extension of the Violence Against Women Act, received the vote of only 38% of the Republicans in the House of Representatives.
  - On April 9, 2013, the "rule" was violated a fourth time, on a bill about federal acquisition of historic sites. The bill was passed with more than two thirds of the House vote but without a majority of the GOP caucus. Shortly thereafter, Boehner said, "Listen: It was never a rule to begin with. And certainly my prerogative – my intention is to always pass bills with strong Republican support."
  - On October 16, 2013, Boehner again violated the rule by allowing a floor vote to reopen the government and raise the debt ceiling. The House voted 285 to 144 less than three hours after the Senate overwhelmingly passed the Continuing Appropriations Act, 2014. The "yea" votes consisted of 198 Democrats and only 87 Republicans, less than 40% of the conference.
  - On February 11, 2014, Boehner broke the rule by allowing a floor vote on a "clean" debt ceiling bill. The bill passed the house 221–201, with only 28 Republicans voting "yea" along with 193 Democrats.
- Paul Ryan (2015–2019): Ryan promised his caucus that he would apply the Hastert rule to immigration bills proposed during his tenure as speaker, although conflicting reports have also interpreted his statements as a more blanket application of the rule. Throughout his speakership, Ryan did not violate the majority-of-the-majority rule.
- Mike Johnson (2023-present): Johnson was named speaker after Kevin McCarthy was vacated as Speaker by all Democrats and 8 Republicans who objected to him passing a spending bill that they viewed as insufficiently conservative, with 209 Democrats voting for it and only one against while only 126 Republicans voted for it and 90 voted against. However, Johnson then passed a spending bill that went further, violating the Hastert rule by passing a spending bill that only 101 Republicans voted in favor and 112 voted against. In April, another bill, this time for Ukraine aid, passed with 101 Republicans voting in favor and 112 against. In an interview with Politico, Johnson claimed that neither vote was knowingly brought up with the support below half, with the former having eight floor defects (whipping putting it at 109 in favor to 104 against) and the latter not being whipped.

== Commentary ==
Conservative groups within the Republican Party have supported the majority-of-the-majority rule. For example, in 2013 a group of conservative movement groups, including Heritage Action, Club for Growth, American Conservative Union, and the Family Research Council all called on Republican speaker Boehner to stick with the Hastert rule and to formally codify it as a House rule. After the 2022 elections, in which Republicans narrowly took control of the House of Representatives, formalization of the "majority of the majority" rule was one of the demands that the right-wing Freedom Caucus presented to Kevin McCarthy.

Commentators' views about the Hastert rule are generally negative, with observers considering it a "structural barrier to compromise". Norman Ornstein of the American Enterprise Institute, an expert on Congress, opposes the rule, arguing that it is a major reason why bills passed on a bipartisan basis in the Senate are often not later introduced in the House. Ornstein notes that the speaker is the leader of their party but is also "a constitutional officer" who is "ratified by the whole House" and as such has a duty to put the House ahead of their party at crucial times.

George Crawford, writing in The Hill, observed that by restricting legislative proposals to those approved by the majority of the speaker's caucus and marginalizing the influence of the minority power, the rule can lead to a breakdown of the legislative process, radicalization of the members of the minority party, and enactment of legislation that does not reflect the broad areas of agreement.

Ezra Klein, while at The Washington Post, wrote that the Hastert rule is "more of an aspiration" than a rule and that codifying it as a formal rule would be detrimental to House Republicans, as it would prevent them from voting against bills that the Republican caucus wanted passed but that a majority of Republicans wanted to oppose for ideological or political reasons.

Matthew Yglesias, writing in Slate, has contended that the rule, while flawed, is better than the alternatives and that the dynamic prior to its adoption was "a weird kind of super-empowerment of the Rules committee that allowed it to arbitrarily bottle up proposals."

Senator Angus King of Maine, an Independent, as well as commentators such as Rex Huppke of The Chicago Tribune and Eric Black of MinnPost have blamed the Hastert rule for the government shutdown of October 2013. Huppke added facetiously, "Here's the fun part: the Hastert Rule isn't an official rule, or an official anything. It's just a made-up concept, like bipartisanship or polite discourse."

CNBC's Ben White has called the Hastert rule "perhaps the most over-hyped phenomena in politics", since Republican speakers "have regularly violated the rule when it was in their interest to do so".

Senator Sheldon Whitehouse, Democrat of Rhode Island, pointed out in a 2013 speech that on the few occasions that the House approved key bipartisan legislation during the 113th Congress, it was because Speaker Boehner did not apply the Hastert rule. Whitehouse cited the farm bill, emergency Hurricane Sandy aid, and averting "fiscal cliff" tax rises as examples of what might be accomplished with House Democrats' and some Republicans' help. While acknowledging abuse of the Senate filibuster as a factor in gridlock, Whitehouse said the Hastert rule in the House was "probably the most significant contributor to dysfunction in Washington right now".

== Discharge petition ==
A discharge petition signed by at least 218 members from any party is the only way to force consideration of a bill that does not have the support of the speaker. However, discharge petitions are rarely successful, as a member of the majority party defying their party's leadership by signing a discharge petition can expect retribution from the leadership.

== See also ==
- Caucus System, New Jersey's similar system
- Condorcet paradox
