= John J. Wilson =

American politician (1926–2015)

John Joseph "Jack" Wilson (May 28, 1926 – May 4, 2015) was an American Democratic Party politician who served in the New Jersey General Assembly from 1958 to 1964.

He was a graduate of Saint Benedict's Preparatory School in Newark, Seton Hall University, and Seton Hall Law School. He served in the United States Navy during World War II, and as a military police lieutenant in the Army during the Korean War.

A resident of Westfield, New Jersey. he was elected to the New Jersey State Assembly in 1957, and was re-elected in 1959 and 1961. In 1963, he sought the Democratic nomination for the New Jersey State Senate, but lost the primary to his Assembly colleague, James M. McGowan.
