= James M. McGowan =

American politician

James M. McGowan (January 19, 1920 – November 28, 2004) was an American Democratic Party official who served three terms in the New Jersey General Assembly from 1957 to 1963.

McGowan was born in Elizabeth, New Jersey on January 19, 1920. He graduated from Thomas Jefferson High School in Elizabeth and attended Union Junior College in Cranford. He founded Colby and McGowan, Inc., an Elizabeth-based printing firm, in 1938.

He was elected to the New Jersey State Assembly in 1957, and was re-elected in 1959 and 1961. He ran for State Senator in 1963 and won the Democratic primary against Assemblyman John J. Wilson, but lost to incumbent Republican Nelson Stamler by a 55%-45% margin.
