= Marianne Espinosa =

American judge

Marianne Espinosa, formerly known as Marianne Espinosa Murphy, is a Judge of the Appellate Division of New Jersey Superior Court, and the subject of a political controversy in New Jersey in 1993. She is the ex-wife of Michael Murphy, a former county prosecutor and unsuccessful gubernatorial candidate in New Jersey.

Espinosa earned her undergraduate degree from New York University and received her law degree from Rutgers School of Law—Newark. She was a law clerk to the Hon. Richard J. Hughes, Chief Justice of the Supreme Court of New Jersey and former Governor. She served as a Deputy Attorney General and later as an Assistant U.S. Attorney for the District of New Jersey, where she successfully prosecuted United States v. Gambino.

Judge Espinosa has served two separate terms on the Superior Court. She was first appointed to the Court in 1986, serving a seven-year term on the bench in Morris County, New Jersey, while she was a resident of Chatham Township. Judge Murphy (as she was known at the time) served in the Civil, Criminal and Family Divisions. Her term was to end in September 1993, at which time Governor James Florio nominated her for a second term, which would mean tenure until the retirement age of 70. State Senator John H. Dorsey announced that he would invoke senatorial courtesy to block her reappointment. Despite endorsements from the New Jersey State Bar Association and advocacy groups for custodial parents, Dorsey indicated that he had received complaints that she "giggles and throws pencils on the desk during testimony". This created a controversy. Dorsey eventually relented to some degree and stated that he would agree to allow Judge Murphy to be appointed to a new, untenured seven-year term. Judge Murphy declined on the grounds that the process of refusing her an untenured term without a hearing in the Senate posed a threat to judicial independence. Senator Dorsey was defeated for re-election by a Democrat in a heavily Republican district in the same election in which Republican Christine Todd Whitman defeated incumbent Governor James Florio.

Judge Espinosa and Michael Murphy were divorced in 2005.

In 2005, Judge Espinosa was nominated by Governor Richard Codey to a seat on the Superior Court in Union County. She took her oath of office on July 22, 2005. She served several years in the Criminal and Civil Divisions in Union County. She was then assigned by Chief Justice Stuart Rabner to the Appellate Division, effective August 1, 2009, having previously served on the Appellate Division in a temporary capacity from March through May 2009.
