= New Jersey State Auditor =

The New Jersey State Auditor is a constitutional officer appointed by the New Jersey Legislature and administratively placed within the Office of Legislative Services. The Auditor conducts financial and performance audits of State agencies, certain school districts, and vicinages of the Judiciary. The State Auditor also conducts studies on the operation, economy and efficiency of State-run or State-supported programs.

== History ==
The Office of the State Auditor, which is in the legislative branch of government, was originally established in 1934 pursuant to P.L. 1933, c.295. A number of statutory amendments dealing with the powers and duties of the State Auditor have been enacted in the ensuing years. The Office of the State Auditor is within the Office of Legislative Services under the provisions of the Legislative Services Act.

The State Auditor is a constitutional officer appointed by the Legislature for a term of five years and until a successor shall be appointed and qualified. On February 23, 2021, Mr. David J. Kaschak, CPA, CGFM, was confirmed by a joint session of the Legislature as the State Auditor.

The organization of the office within the legislative branch permits the State Auditor to be independent of the executive and judicial branches of government. This independence is critical in terms of meeting professional standards and in providing fair and objective reviews and audits of governmental operations.

Under the provisions of Article VII, Section I, Paragraph 6 of the State Constitution and N.J.S.A 52:14-1 et seq., the Office of the State Auditor is required to conduct post-audits of all transactions and accounts kept by or for all departments, offices, and agencies of state government. Reports are submitted to the Legislature, the Governor, and the Executive Director of the Office of Legislative Services.

The Public Laws of 2006, Chapter 82 authorized the State Auditor to conduct a performance review of any program of any accounting agency, any independent authority, or any public entity or grantee that receives state funds. The law also requires the State Auditor to conduct a follow-up review to determine compliance with audit recommendations. In addition, at the request of the legislative leadership or the Legislative Services Commission, the State Auditor conducts studies on the operation of state and state-supported agencies with respect to their efficiency, internal management control, and compliance with applicable laws and regulations.

== Accomplishments ==
During calendar year 2022 the Office of the State Auditor identified $44.1 million in new cost savings and revenue enhancements. The schedule of cost savings and revenue enhancements is presented on page 2 of their 2022 Annual Report. Their compliance review on findings related to audit reports issued during the fiscal year ended June 30, 2022 disclosed that 82 percent of the recommendations have been complied with or management has taken steps to achieve compliance in the first year. For audits in their second year of follow-up review, compliance was at 87.8 percent. The State Auditor continued to share training opportunities with other state government accountants through audio conferences in various topics at no charge to the individual's employing agency.

The office performs the annual financial audit of the state's Annual Comprehensive Financial Report (ACFR). The ACFR engagement includes the audit of 207 funds and component units which had a full accrual accounting total asset value of $283.1 billion at June 30, 2022.

== Types of Audits Performed ==
Financial Audits

Financial audits are designed to provide reasonable assurance about whether the financial statements of an audited entity are fairly presented in conformity with generally accepted accounting principles. The primary annual financial audit conducted by the office is the opinion on the state's Comprehensive Annual Financial Report (CAFR) which is published by the Department of the Treasury. Two other financial audits were issued in calendar year 2014.

Performance Audits

The objectives of this type of audit are to determine whether financial transactions are related to an agency's programs, are reasonable, and are recorded properly in the accounting systems. This type of audit may also focus on specific performance issues. Where appropriate, these engagements may also provide economy and efficiency comments. Audits are selected using a risk-based approach. Larger departments are audited on a divisional, agency, or program basis rather than on a department-wide basis because of their size and complexity.

Information Technology Audits

The objectives of an information technology audit are to determine whether the data maintained by a particular computer system is reliable, valid, safeguarded, and recorded properly; whether agency networks are properly managed to provide for business continuity and the prevention of system abuse; and whether system development and maintenance is performed in accordance with guidelines and best practices.

The office has trained all audit staff on the basics of integrated auditing, where field auditors learn how to review IT controls applicable to the scope of their audit. If the system they are reviewing has more complex controls, an IT auditor can be consulted or the system itself can be assigned to the IT unit as a separate audit. This effort will allow for review of a greater number of IT controls.

School District Audits

N.J.S.A. 18A:7F-6d authorizes the Office of the State Auditor to audit the accounts and financial transactions of any school district in which the state aid equals 80 percent or more of its net budget for the year. In addition, in accordance with N.J.S.A. 18A:7A-57, the State Auditor is authorized to perform a forensic audit of school districts with a general fund deficit and meeting additional specific criteria as stated in the statute.

Legislative Requests

From time to time the Legislative Services Commission and Legislative Leadership requests the State Auditor to conduct special projects of the fiscal practices and procedures of the state and state-supported agencies, and to report findings to the Commission.

== Current State Auditor ==
David J. Kaschak (2021–present)

== Past State Auditors ==
- Stephen M. Eells (2010–2020)
- Richard L. Fair (1990–2008)
- James Dolan (1981–1989)
- George B. Harper (1964–1981)
- Frank Durand (1938–1964)
- Walter Darby (1934–1938)
