= Roy V. Wright =

American politician

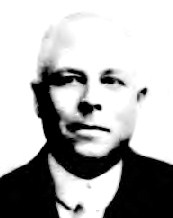

Member of the New Jersey Senate from Essex County
- In office January 1942 – January 1948
- Preceded by: Homer C. Zink
- Succeeded by: Alfred C. Clapp

Essex County Freeholder
- In office January 1935 – January 1938

Personal details
- Born: Royden Vincent Wright; October 8, 1876 Red Wing, Minnesota, U.S.
- Died: July 9, 1948 (aged 71) East Orange, New Jersey, U.S.
- Party: Republican
- Spouse: Eliza Grumman Bratton (1879-1962)
- Education: University of Minnesota
- Occupation: Engineer

Royden Vincent (Roy) Wright (October 8, 1876 – July 9, 1948) was an American Republican Party politician who served in the New Jersey State Senate.

== Early life ==
Wright was born October 8, 1876, in Red Wing, Minnesota, the son of Reuben Andrus Wright (1851–1927) and Louisa Anna Schaefer Wright (1855-1945). He attended public schools in Minneapolis, Minnesota, and was an 1898 graduate of the University of Minnesota with a degree in Mechanical Engineering. He moved to East Orange, New Jersey, in 1904.

Wright was a Director and Vice President of the Simmons-Boardman Publishing Corporation. He was the 50th President of the American Society of Mechanical Engineers. He also served as Managing Editor of Railway Age, an American trade journal for the rail transport industry, from 1911 until his death in 1948.

== Political career ==
Wright became active in politics in the 1920s and was a member of the national Engineers Committee for Herbert Hoover in the 1928 presidential campaign.

He was elected to the Essex County Board of Freeholders in 1934 and served one three-year term. He was elected Republican State Committeeman from Essex County in 1940 and served one three-year term.

In 1941, Homer C. Zink resigned from the State Senate following his appointment by the Legislature as the New Jersey State Controller. Wright became a candidate for State Senator. In November, 1941, he defeated Democrat J. Raymond Berry. He was re-elected in 1944 against Democrat Edward J. Gilhooly. He was not a candidate for re-election in 1947.

== Death ==
Wright died of a heart ailment on July 9, 1948, at age 72.
