= David Young III =

American politician (1905–1977)

Member of the New Jersey Senate from the Morris district
- In office 1947–1953
- Preceded by: Harold A. Pierson
- Succeeded by: Thomas J. Hillery

Member of the New Jersey General Assembly from the Morris district
- In office 1941–1946

Personal details
- Born: March 1, 1905 San Francisco, California, U.S.
- Died: December 17, 1977 (aged 72) Boca Raton, Florida, U.S.
- Party: Republican

David Young III (March 1, 1905 – December 17, 1977) was an American politician who served in the New Jersey General Assembly from 1941 to 1946 and in the New Jersey Senate from 1947 to 1953. Before his death, he resided in Boonton Township, New Jersey.
