= Wesley Stanger =

Wesley A. Stanger
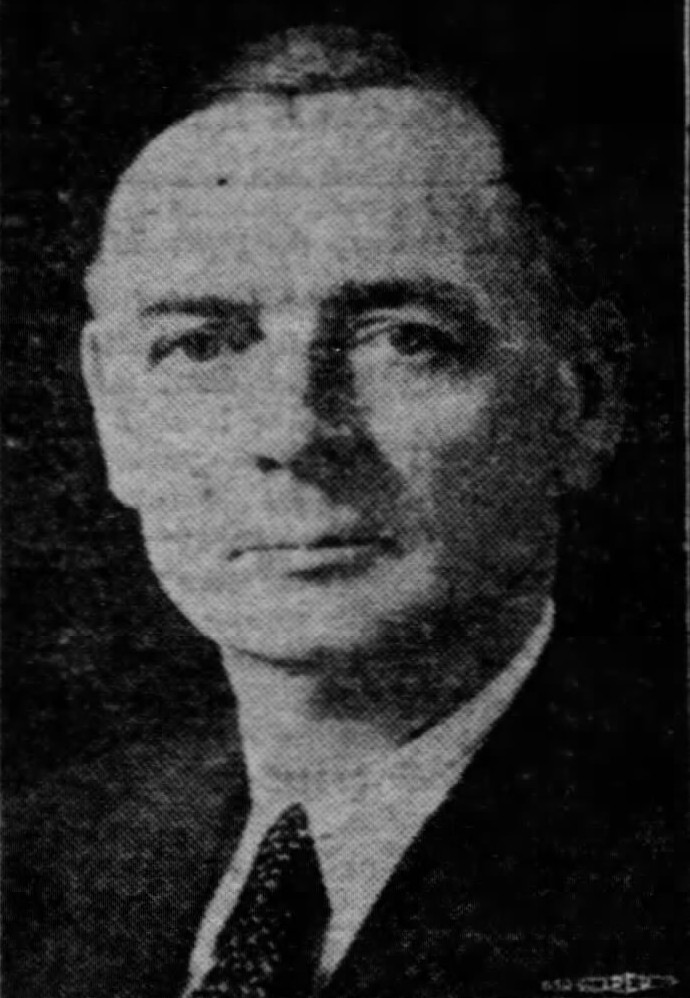
- Stanger in 1939
- Born: March 19, 1880
- Died: July 6, 1961 (aged 81); Cranford, New Jersey
- Occupations: editor, politician

Wesley A. Stanger (March 19, 1880 – July 6, 1961) was an American Republican Party politician and newspaper reporter and editor. Stanger was a teetotaler who ran for Congress twice in the 1930s as an opponent of Prohibition. Stanger was born in Chicago, where he worked as a reporter for Hearst Newspapers before becoming the editor of the Buffalo Morning Review. He later worked as the editor and publisher of several trade organizations, was the owner of the Motion Picture Review, and was the Secretary of the National Trade Press Association.

In 1930, Stanger challenged U.S. Rep. Ernest Robinson Ackerman in the Republican Primary. Ackerman was considered a "Dry" candidate who supported Prohibition; Stanger was the "Wet" candidate. Ackerman won by a wide margin, 43,724 to 17,826.

Ackerman died in 1931, and a Special Election was scheduled for December 4, preceded by a Special Primary on November 17. Stanger ran again, as did three other Republicans: Assistant Union County Prosecutor Donald H. McLean, a former Secretary to U.S. Senator John Kean, Assemblyman Kenneth Hand (R-Roselle), and John E. Nicol, who had been Ackerman's secretary for many years. McLean, a "Wet" candidate, won the primary with 8,811 votes, followed by Hand, a "Dry" candidate (6,707 votes), Nicol, a "Dry" candidate, (4,828 votes, and Stanger finishing last with 1,776 votes.

After the repeal of prohibition, Governor Harold Hoffman named Stanger as the first Chief Inspector of the New Jersey Department of Alcoholic Beverage Control. He also served as a Republican County Committeeman and as founder and president of the Cranford Historical Society. He died at his home in Cranford, New Jersey at the age of 81.
