= Sylvia Pressler =

American judge (1934–2010)

Sylvia Pressler (April 10, 1934 – February 15, 2010) was an American judge who served in a number of positions within the New Jersey judicial system. She is best known for deciding a landmark 1973 case which allowed girls to compete in Little League baseball in New Jersey, and which resulted in the organization changing its charter to allow girls to play in its league nationally. Pressler served as the Chief Judge of the Appellate Division of the New Jersey Superior Court for five years. Prior to this she was the Presiding Judge for 15 years. She officially retired from the bench in 2004. A graduate of Rutgers School of Law–Newark at a time when the legal profession was still dominated by men, Judge Pressler was the second woman to sit on the appellate division in New Jersey, and was one of the first women to clerk for an appellate division judge.

== Biography ==
Pressler was born as Sylvia Diane Brodsky in New York City, the daughter of Jewish immigrants from Belarus and Poland. Her father died when she was a young girl. Growing up in the Bronx, she attended Hunter College High School. She attended Queens College and later Boston University for her undergraduate studies, earning her degree in 1955, and earned her law degree from Rutgers School of Law–Newark. She met her husband, with whom she would later have two children, when they were both working in a restaurant in 1953. At the time that she earned her degree, the law profession in the United States was male-dominated. Pressler became one of the first women in the state to clerk for an appellate judge. For a time, she worked in private practice and as city attorney for Englewood, New Jersey. In 1973, she was appointed to the bench in Bergen County and four years later, in 1976 to the Superior Court. The following year, she was appointed to the appellate division of the Superior Court, one of the first women to serve in that role.

In 1973, when serving as a Hearing Examiner for the New Jersey Department of Civil Rights, Pressler ruled on the landmark case that opened Little League baseball to girls. The case had its origins in the previous year, when a twelve-year-old girl in Hoboken, New Jersey, was forced to quit a Little League baseball after only three games when national Little League authorities threatened to revoke the charter of the local league. A case was filed on behalf of the girl by the National Organization for Women. Pressler was assigned the case. She ruled in a strongly worded decision that the girl should have been allowed to play, writing:

The institution of Little League is as American as the hot dog and apple pie. There is no reason why that part of Americana should be withheld from girls.

Her decision forced Little League to allow girls to play everywhere in New Jersey, and was met with protests from the national Little League organization, which called the ruling vindictive and prejudicial. The following year, the organization changed its charter nationally to allow girls to play on its teams anywhere in the United States, and created a softball division as well. According to her husband, David Pressler, she did not think that the Little League case was a difficult one to decide.

In 1997, Pressler became the first woman to be appointed as Presiding Judge of the state's appellate division, and took on additional administrative responsibilities. Over the course of her career, she issued hundreds of decisions, though few as widely covered in the media as the Little League case. In 1993, she decided a second prominent case, In re. Adoption of Two Children by H.N.R. (666 A.2d 535, N.J. Super. Ct. App. Div. 1995), giving gay couples the right to adopt the children of their partners, writing that, "They function together as a family." In 2004, her decision imposing a moratorium on the death penalty in New Jersey until the state's procedures could guarantee the rights of the defendant was followed three years later by legislative action banning the death penalty entirely.

Her decisions were not without critics. In 1983, State Senator Gerald Cardinale attempted to block her reappointment to the Superior Court by invoking senatorial courtesy. Senate President Carmen A. Orechio removed Cardinale's ability to block her nomination, citing the fact that he had previously appeared before Judge Pressler in a legal matter, and her nomination was approved. She retired from the bench in 2004. Pressler was awarded the medal of honor of the New Jersey State Bar Foundation in recognition of her service to that state's justice system. Judge Pressler died on February 15, 2010, following a battle with lymphoma at her home in Sparta Township, New Jersey, at the age of 75. She was survived by her husband, David Pressler and their two children and three grandchildren.

Until her death, Pressler was the commentator and annotator of the Gann Law Books edition of the Rules Governing the Courts of the State of New Jersey, which are the most commonly used edition of the Court Rules in New Jersey; the duties have since been taken over by former Attorney General and Supreme Court Justice Peter Verniero, but Pressler is still credited on new editions.
