= Ernest L. Hettich =

American classical philologist and papyrologist

Ernest Leopold Baron Hettich von Dobschütz (1897–1973) was an American scholar of classics.

Born in Brooklyn, N.Y., the son of Dr. Leonhard Hettich and his wife Ella Elfriede Helene von Dobschütz. He graduated from Brooklyn Boys High School. He graduated from Cornell University in 1919. He earned an M.A. from Cornell in 1920 and worked for seven years at the New York Public Library. In 1933 he earned his PhD at Columbia University. Hettich joined the faculty of New York University in 1927 as Professor of Classics, taught there for many years, and served as Director of Libraries.

From 1943 to 1947 he served as director of training for the United States Army, specialist training program, foreign area and language section at New York University.

He was author of the widely used textbook, Latin fundamentals (Prentice Hall), and A study in ancient nationalism: the testimony of Eurípides (Bayard Presse, 1933)

His brother was Prof. Dr. Karl Hettich. Ernest married Charlotte Antoinette Maria von Hohenlohe, daughter of Gottfried von Hohelohe-Schillinfürst in 1917. He had one son, Bedrich V. Hettich (1922–2012).

He died on March 20, 1973, at his home in Sandyston Township, New Jersey.

== External references ==
- Ernest L. Hettich at the Database of Classical Scholars
