= H. Roy Wheeler =

American politician

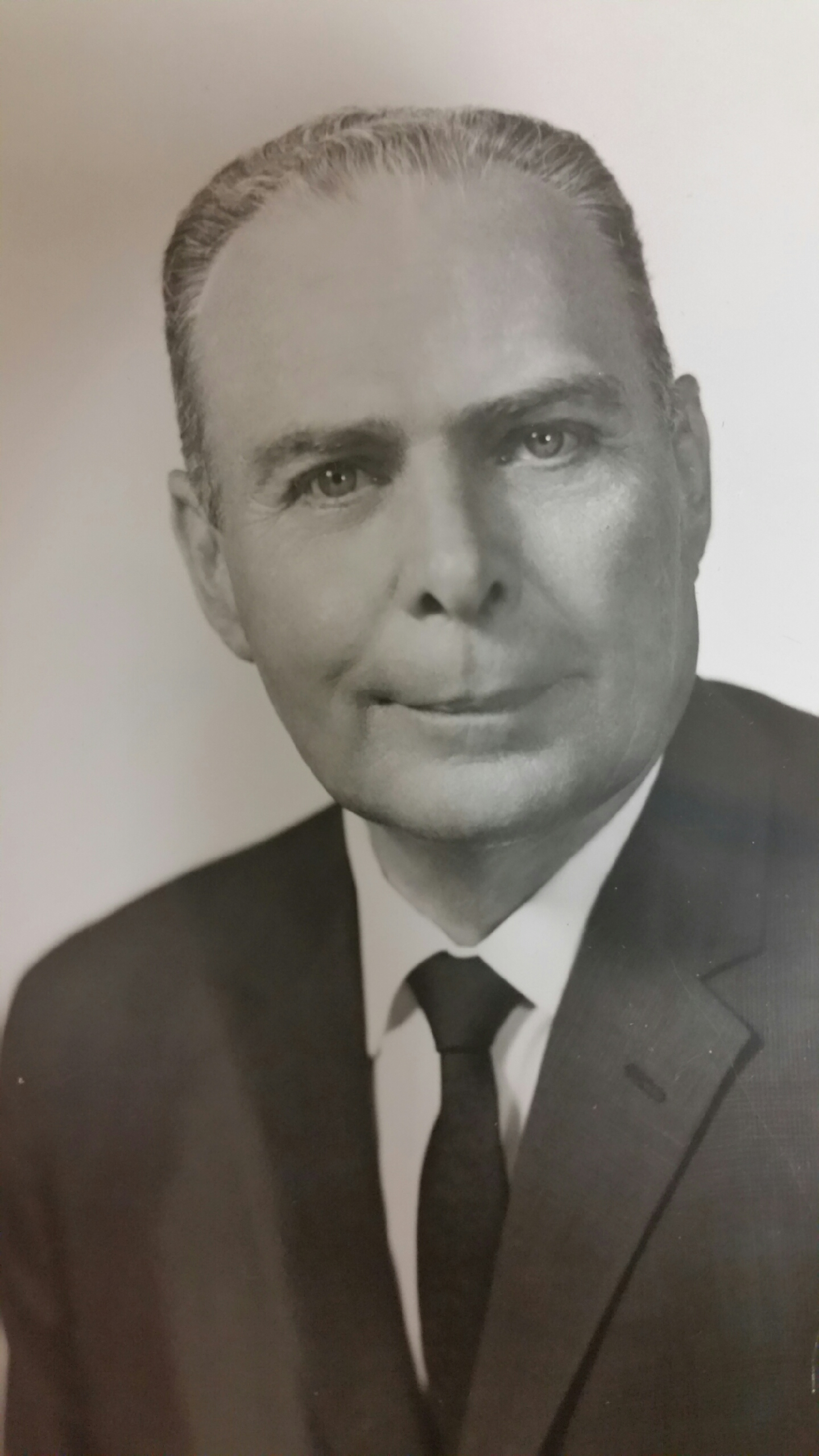
- Wheeler c. 1952

Mayor of Linden, New Jersey
- In office November, 1943 – January, 1953

Personal details
- Born: November 14, 1904
- Died: February 1978 (aged 73)
- Political party: Democratic

H. Roy Wheeler (November 14, 1904–February 1978) was an American Democratic Party politician who served as the Mayor of Linden, New Jersey.

== Biography ==
He served as Mayor of Linden from November, 1943 to January, 1953, and on the Union County Tax Board. He was the Democratic nominee for State Senator in 1959 and came within 557 votes of defeating the Republican incumbent, Robert C. Crane. Crane died in 1962, and with the State Senate evenly divided at ten Republicans and ten Democrats, a special election would determine control of the upper house. Wheeler again ran for the Senate, this time against Republican Assemblyman Nelson Stamler, who won statewide fame in the 1940s and 1950s as a racket-busting prosecutor who waged a war on illegal gambling.

Because control of the Senate was at stake, the race between Wheeler and Stamler attracted considerable attention from statewide officials. Richard J. Hughes, who was in his first year as governor, became heavily invested in the campaign. With a Democratic-controlled State Assembly, Hughes needed control of the Senate to advance his legislative agenda. Senate Republicans had a rule, known as the Caucus System, that no bill could advance to the floor for a vote unless a majority of the majority caucus supported it. Democrats had advocated a rule change.

Both of New Jersey's United States Senators, Republican Clifford P. Case and Democrat Harrison A. Williams, campaigned actively for their party's Senate candidates. Case and Williams were both from Union County.

In October, Hughes accused Stamler of raising money from the New Jersey Homebuilders Association, which opposed the expansion of anti-discrimination housing laws. Stamler had attended a fundraiser at the Short Hills home of a prominent builder, Louis R. Barba. Stamler said that the New Jersey Democratic State Committee had also solicited funds from the Homebuilders Association. Wheeler sought to make Civil Rights an issue in his legislative race, saying that Stamler was an opponent of Civil Rights and that the Caucus System served to block Civil Rights legislation. Stamler said that he was the sponsor of a bill that advocated fair housing in the State Assembly.

The New York Times noted the highly negative tone of the Senate race: "The campaign has veered sharply in the last two weeks into a vitriolic struggle with attempts at character assassination overshadowing all other issues."

The race turned out to be not all that close, with Stamler winning by 7,230 votes, 96,171 to 88,941 (52%-48%).
