= Thomas A. Mathis =

New Jersey State Senator and political boss

Member of the New Jersey Senate from Ocean County
- In office 1942–1946
- Preceded by: W. Steelman Mathis
- Succeeded by: W. Steelman Mathis
- In office 1923–1931
- Preceded by: Harry T. Hagaman
- Succeeded by: Wilfred H. Jayne Jr.
- In office 1914–1916
- Preceded by: George C. Low
- Succeeded by: David G. Conrad
- In office 1910–1910
- Preceded by: William J. Harrison
- Succeeded by: George C. Low

18th Secretary of State of New Jersey
- In office 1931–1941
- Governor: Morgan F. Larson; A. Harry Moore; Harold G. Hoffman
- Preceded by: Joseph F. S. Fitzpatrick
- Succeeded by: Joseph A. Brophy

Personal details
- Born: June 7, 1869 New Gretna, New Jersey, U.S.
- Died: May 18, 1958 (aged 88) Toms River, New Jersey, U.S.
- Party: Republican

Thomas A. "Captain Tom" Mathis (June 7, 1869 – May 18, 1958) was an American Republican Party boss who served in the New Jersey Senate and was the Secretary of State of New Jersey from 1931 to 1941. He was known as a racketeer and as the party boss of Ocean County, New Jersey during the early 20th century. His son was state senator W. Steelman Mathis.

== Biography ==
Raised in the New Gretna section of Bass River Township, New Jersey, Mathis started his career as a councilman in Tuckerton, New Jersey, before moving to Toms River in 1907, Mathis won a special election for an unexpired term in the State Senate in 1910. He lost re-election in the 1911 primary, won his seat back in 1913, and lost it again in the 1915 primary. Mathis returned to the Senate in 1923.

A very corrupt figure in New Jersey politics, Mathis reportedly received kickbacks on illegal gambling and prostitution operations. He was known as Captain Tom because he commanded J. P. Morgan's America's Cup yacht for eleven years.

He committed suicide on May 18, 1958, at his home in Toms River at age 88.

== Electoral history ==
Ocean County Senator Special Election, 1910
Party	Candidate	Votes	%
Republican	Thomas A. Mathis		
Total votes		{{{votes}}}	

Tuckerton Boro Council General Election
Party	Candidate	Votes	%
Republican	Thomas A. Mathis		
Republican hold			
