= Joseph Stamler =

American lawyer and judge (1911-1998)

Judge of the New Jersey Superior Court
- In office 1966 – April 1973
- Appointed by: Governor Richard J. Hughes

Personal details
- Born: Joseph Howard Stamler; November 19, 1911 Elizabeth, New Jersey
- Died: October 16, 1998 (aged 86) Stony Creek, Connecticut
- Education: Cornell University; Harvard Law School
- Occupation: Judge (1966–1973); Attorney; Professor of Law

Joseph Howard Stamler (November 19, 1911 – October 16, 1998) was an American lawyer and judge who served for seven years in New Jersey Superior Court, as well as a professor of law at Rutgers University. During his judicial career, Stamler was credited with having "handed down decisions of both statewide and national impact" on matters of significant public and social importance.

== Career before the bench ==
Born in Elizabeth, New Jersey on November 19, 1911, Stamler graduated from Cornell University in 1933 and earned his juris doctor degree from Harvard Law School in 1935. He entered private practice after being admitted to the bar, with a five-year break during World War II, when his activities included serving with the United States Navy as the captain of a ship that performed air-sea rescue duty in the North Atlantic. Resuming his practice after the war, Stamler focused on chancery and federal court cases, in addition to teaching law at Rutgers University.

In 1940, shortly after marrying the former Lillian Spitzer, Stamler moved to Summit, New Jersey, where he became a longtime resident. Active in his hometown, Stamler argued successfully before the New Jersey Supreme Court on behalf of the city in a 1958 case in which Summit was given approval to build low-income housing in the face of opposition from residents who were against the plan. Reflecting on his legal career after he had announced his retirement from judicial service, he cited the case as one that he was proudest of handling, saying that it was a matter in which the city had sought to provide affordable housing to residents "before it became the thing to do".

A registered Republican, Stamler was nominated as a Superior Court Judge by Governor of New Jersey Richard J. Hughes as part of package of 42 nominations issued in September 1966 that was the largest single group of nominations in state history to that time, including 20 Superior Court judges evenly distributed by party affiliation. In order to be able to accept the judgeship, Stamler had to give up his 30-year private practice of law, which had been based in Newark.

== Significant cases ==
Some of Stamler's best-known cases involved matters such as religion in the classroom, aircraft noise and environmental impact where there was little or no legal precedent to guide him.

Stamler issued a 1969 opinion in a case regarding noise from business jets operating at Morristown Municipal Airport, brought by residents and governments of surrounding municipalities, in which he set a curfew limiting takeoffs and landings during overnight hours. The judge refused to allow a group of airlines and airline industry organizations to register their objections in the case saying that he hoped that "the giants of industry will see the wisdom of slowing the cross-country speed of their important executives, and will take a close, concerned look at the little people of this country" who were the ones dealing with the impact of noise and ticket prices. Stamler's curfew, prohibiting takeoffs or landings by jets after 9:00 PM and before 7:00 AM most days and limiting flights by jets to a two-hour window on Sundays, was overturned by Superior Court Judge Gordon L. Brown who found Stamler's curfew to be in conflict with a decision made by the United States Supreme Court earlier that year in the case of City of Burbank v. Lockheed Air Terminal, Inc. in which the court rejected a similar curfew imposed by the city of Burbank, California on Hollywood Burbank Airport limiting overnight flights on the basis of the fact that airports were subject to federal oversight by the Federal Aviation Administration under the terms of the Noise Control Act of 1972.

He issued a decision in February 1970 in the case State Board of Education v. Board of Education of Netcong, New Jersey regarding a matter in which the school board of the Netcong School District in Netcong, New Jersey had a policy providing for voluntary readings at the start of the school day at Netcong High School of prayers that had been published in the Congressional Record, as they had been given at the start of daily sessions in Congress by the Chaplain of the United States House of Representatives. The board presented the program of voluntary readings as being intended to be inspirational remarks for the students, rather than as prayer in the schools. In his decision, Judge Stamler prohibited what he described as a "subterfuge [that] is degrading to all religions", arguing that by taking what were "beautiful prayers" and referring to them merely as "remarks", the school district was working to "peddle religion in a very cheap manner under an assumed name." The New Jersey Supreme Court unanimously affirmed Stamler's decision and an appeal filed by the district in the case was rejected by the United States Supreme Court.

In a case brought by the American Civil Liberties Union, Stamler issued an opinion in April 1970 in which he ruled that the provision of busing by the West Morris Regional High School District to private school students was improper based on the fact that the 14,000 private school students who lived in school districts (usually large cities) where busing was not provided were denied the protections of the Equal Protection Clause of the Fourteenth Amendment. In June 1971, the New Jersey Supreme Court unanimously overturned Stamler's decision and upheld the constitutionality of the program, allowing 106,000 students from private schools to receive busing through their local school district at the start of the 1970-71 school year in September. In his decision, Chief Justice Joseph Weintraub emphasized that the legislature had made busing for private school students subject to the same rules and regulations as for public school students residing in the same district.

Stamler rejected a proposal for a six-day rock festival to be held in the summer of 1970 on a 400-acre (160 ha) site in Walpack Township in Sussex County, leading to the passage of standards for similar events that requires planning for traffic and safety between the organizers and local authorities, and sets limits on duration. Stamler stated that any positive benefits from such an event must be weighed against the "health, safety and welfare of the young, and the potential harm to the public".

In March 1971, Stamler allowed a suit challenging a mandatory sex education curriculum at Parsippany-Troy Hills School District by Roman Catholic parents who argued that the program violated their First Amendment rights to free exercise of their religion. Stamler rejected the district's claim that a significant majority of parents had supported the program and allowed the suit filed by the parents to proceed, saying that the protections afforded under the First Amendment would be unnecessary if majority rule would prevail in such circumstances, noting that the protections were intended to protect the religious freedoms of "the one person who is sincere in a conscientious religious conviction".

A 1972 judgement against United States Mineral Company of Stanhope, New Jersey that assessed a fine of $250,000 for emitting excessive air pollution on 360 days in a single year was the largest such fine assessed against a polluter of this kind in the United States to that point.

Even after suffering two strokes and being advised by his doctors that he should leave the bench, he delayed his retirement by two years, saying that his judicial role was one that he "enjoyed more than anything else in the world." He left Superior Court in April 1973 and was regarded by The New York Times as having "handed down decisions of both statewide and national impact".

== Life after the bench ==
Judge Stamler developed a program in Connecticut for youthful first offenders that allowed them to learn about the law by participating in moot court cases and led a program that was intended to allow the public learn more about the judicial system by visiting courts.

== Personal life ==
A resident of the Stony Creek section of Branford, Connecticut, Stamler died at the age of 86 on October 16, 1998, after what was described in his obituary as a "long illness". He had maintained a second home there since his days as a judge and would write opinions there, in addition to relaxing by fishing and lobstering. He was married to Lillian Spitzer Stamler and had two sons, Joseph Jr. and Paul, in addition to three grandchildren, Abbi, Reed and Theodore. Stamler's brother Nelson was a Republican Assemblyman and State Senator, who also served in Superior Court. His nephew, John H. Stamler, served three terms as prosecutor in Union County. The John H. Stamler Police Academy in Union County is named in his memory, for which he fought.
