= Edward Gaulkin =

American judge

Edward Gaulkin (April 23, 1903 – June 12, 1993) was an American jurist and prosecutor from New Jersey. Gaulkin was born in the city of Minsk, then in the Russian Empire; his family emigrated to the United States in 1906.

Gaulkin attended Columbia University, the University of Denver's College of Law, and New York University School of Law. He was admitted to the bar in 1929. He was the Recorder and Township Attorney for Livingston, New Jersey in the 1930s and 1940s, was the Deputy Essex County Surrogate from 1947 to 1948, and the First Assistant Essex County Prosecutor from 1948 to 1949.

Governor Alfred Driscoll appointed him Essex County Prosecutor in 1952, and then as Deputy Attorney General of New Jersey. Driscoll named him to serve as a County Court Judge in 1953, and Governor Robert B. Meyner named him to the New Jersey Superior Court in 1958. From 1958 until his retirement in 1973, Gaulkin served as a New Jersey Appellate Court Judge.

His son, Geoffrey Gaulkin, later served as a Superior Court Judge.
