= John H. Stamler =

American prosecutor (1938-1990)

John Harry Stamler

Union County, New Jersey Prosecutor
- In office 1977–1990
- Preceded by: Michael Evans
- Succeeded by: Andrew K. Ruotolo

Personal details
- Born: December 3, 1938 Elizabeth, New Jersey
- Died: March 25, 1990 (aged 51) Scotch Plains, New Jersey
- Spouse(s): Linda Stamler; Jeanne Martin
- Children: Richard Stamler, Stephen Stamler, Gary Stamler, Elizabeth Stamler, Dennis Stamler
- Parent: Nelson Stamler
- Education: Lafayette College (1961); Vanderbilt University Law School (1964)

John Harry Stamler (December 3, 1938 – March 25, 1990) was the Union County, New Jersey, prosecutor from 1977 until his death. He was New Jersey's first three-term County Prosecutor, appointed by a Democratic Governor and reappointed twice by a Republican Governor. He was the director of the New Jersey Narcotics Strike Force from 1972 to 1975. He served as President of the New Jersey County Prosecutor's Association.

== Biography ==
Stamler was born in Elizabeth, New Jersey on December 3, 1938, the son of Nelson Stamler (1909–1972) and Gertrude Aronwitz (1909–1966), and attended Pingry School. His parents were first-generation Jewish Americans of Austrian descent. His father was prominent as a racket-busting prosecutor in the 1940s and 1950s, and later served in the New Jersey Senate and as a Union County Court Judge. His uncle, Joseph Stamler, was a New Jersey Superior Court Judge. Stamler was born Jewish. He was a graduate of Lafayette College and Vanderbilt University Law School. He was a Law Clerk to the Presiding Judge of the Appellate Division of the New Jersey Superior Court. His son Stephen Stamler was a police detective.

After serving as an associate with an Elizabeth law firm, Stamler became a partner in the Scotch Plains law firm of Stamler and Kaczorowksi. He also taught criminal justice at Union County College. Gov.Byrne appointed him to the New Jersey Drug Abuse Advisory Council in 1974. He also served as the Scotch Plains Municipal Prosecutor.

In 1967, Stamler was appointed Assistant Prosecutor in Union County, New Jersey. He was the Director of the Narcotics Strike Force from 1972 to 1975. Governor Brendan Byrne, a Democrat, appointed Stamler to serve as the Union County Prosecutor in 1977. He was reappointed by Governor Thomas Kean, a Republican, in 1982 and again in 1988. He was New Jersey's first three-term County Prosecutor.

Stamler had a viral infection which damaged his heart, leaving him with just 10% capacity. He had a heart transplant in 1988. He died of non-Hodgkin's lymphoma at his home in Scotch Plains, New Jersey on March 25, 1990, at the age of 51.

== Legacy ==
The John H. Stamler Police Academy in Union County is named in his memory, for which he fought. The New Jersey County Prosecutor's Association honors Stamler's memory with the John H. Stamler Scholarship, which provides assistance to sworn law enforcement officers "seeking educational advancement on a college or graduate level to improve his or her skills as a law enforcement officer." The New Jersey Narcotics Enforcement Officers Association awards the Prosecutor John Stamler Lifetime Achievement Award each year.

== Family ==
His first marriage to Linda Stamler ended in divorce; they had three children: Stephen, Richard, and Gary. He had two children with his second wife, Jeanne Martin: Elizabeth and Dennis. Stephen Stamler, a Detective Sergeant with the Berkeley Heights Police Department, died of a heart attack in 2009 at the age of 44. The same year, Sgt. Richard Stamler of the Union County Prosecutor's Office, received a heart transplant. Elizabeth Stamler is a volunteer for the New Jersey Sharing Network, which promotes organ donations.
