= John M. Summerill Jr. =

American politician (1898-1969)

John M. Summerill Jr. (August 3, 1898 – August 24, 1969) was an American Republican Party politician who served as President of the New Jersey State Senate and as Acting Governor of New Jersey.

== Early life ==
Summerill was born August 3, 1898, in Penns Grove, New Jersey, the son of John M. Summerill and Eleanor W. Jacoby Summerill. He attended Wenonah Academy and is a 1922 graduate of Rutgers University, where he was a four-letter man. He was an assistant coach of the Rutgers football team under coach George Sanford. He received his law degree from the New Jersey Law School (now Rutgers University Law School). He practiced law in Camden County before opening a law office in Salem County in 1935. He was elected Republican State Committeeman from Salem County in 1933 and held that post until 1943. During World War I, Summerill was a member of the Students Army Training Corps.

== New Jersey State Assemblyman ==
He was elected to the New Jersey General Assembly in 1928, at age 30, and was re-elected in 1929 and 1930.

== New Jersey State Senator ==
Summerill was elected to the New Jersey State Senate in 1938. He was the Senate President in 1948, and during the extended illness of Governor Alfred Driscoll, he served as the Acting Governor. Summerill was defeated in his 1955 bid for re-election by Democrat John A. Waddington, an Assemblyman.
