= Robert C. Crane =

American politician (1920–1962)

Member of the New Jersey State Senate from Union County
- In office November 1956 – March 1962
- Preceded by: Kenneth Hand
- Succeeded by: Nelson Stamler

Personal details
- Born: September 25, 1920 Elizabeth, New Jersey
- Died: April 24, 1962 (aged 41) Elizabeth, New Jersey
- Spouse: Frances Hyde Adams
- Education: Dartmouth College (1942)

Military service
- Allegiance: United States of America
- Branch/service: United States Army
- Rank: Captain
- Battles/wars: World War II

Robert Clark Crane (September 25, 1920 – April 24, 1962) was an American newspaper publisher and Republican Party politician from New Jersey. He served as a New Jersey State Senator from 1956 until his resignation in 1962 for health reasons. He died of cancer at the age of 41.

== Early years ==
Crane was born in Pittsburgh, Pennsylvania, the son of Frederick L. and Gwendolyn (Kershner) Crane. Both his father and his grandfather Augustus S. Crane were publishers of the Elizabeth Daily Journal in Elizabeth, New Jersey. After graduating from the Pingry School in Elizabeth, Crane attended Dartmouth College, graduating in 1942. After graduation he became a copy boy at the Journal.

Crane married Francis Hyde Adams on November 22, 1942. They had three children: Geoffrey, Jonathan, and Deborah.

== Military service ==
During World War II he served in the Quartermaster Corps of the United States Army in North Africa, Italy, and Germany, rising to the rank of captain and receiving the Bronze Star Medal.

== Newspaper career ==
He returned to the Journal after the war, working as a bookkeeper. He later served as an editorial writer, assistant general manager, assistant editor and general manager. After the death of his father on August 15, 1949, he became editor and publisher of the paper. In 1959 the Journal was sold to the Ralph Ingersoll chain and became part of Mid-Atlantic Newspapers, Inc. Crane remained as head of the paper until early 1960.

== Political career ==
In 1956, State Senator Kenneth Hand resigned to become a Superior Court Judge. Crane became a candidate to fill Hand's unexpired term. He won a hotly contested Republican Primary with 18,294 votes, defeating Assemblyman and former Plainfield Mayor Carlyle W. Crane (12,961) and Assemblyman G. Clifford Thomas (9,091). In the General Election, Crane defeated Democrat H. Douglas Stine, an attorney from Plainfield, by more than 36,000 votes, 59%-41%.

He was re-elected to a second term as State Senator in 1959, just narrowly defeating his Democratic opponent, former Linden Mayor H. Roy Wheeler. Crane won by just 567 votes, 49.6%-49.3%.

In 1961, Governor Robert B. Meyner planned to nominate Plainfield attorney William Phillmore Wood as the first Black to serve on the New Jersey Superior Court. Crane opposed the nomination, saying he did not view Wood as qualified. As the Senator from Wood's home county, Crane used Senatorial Courtesy to block the nomination from coming to a vote by the full Senate. As a compromise, Meyner nominated Wood to the County Court, a lower judicial post. The Superior Court judgeship went to Crane's choice, Milton Feller, a County Court Judge and a former Republican Assemblyman and Elizabeth City Councilman. Wood was then nominated to Feller's seat.

== Potential candidate for Governor of New Jersey ==
Before being diagnosed with cancer, Crane was considered a likely candidate for the 1961 Republican nomination for Governor of New Jersey.

== Health issues and death ==
In November 1961, Crane announced that he would resign his Senate seat early in 1962 after spending a year battling cancer. As a special honor, he was made Senate President for a day. Governor Meyner drove across the Delaware River into Pennsylvania so that Crane could take the oath of office as the Acting Governor of New Jersey, completing the honor. He resigned from the Senate in March 1962. His resignation left the Senate evenly divided between 10 Republicans and 10 Democrats.

Crane died at Elizabeth General Hospital on April 24, 1962, at the age of 41.

After Crane's Senate seat remained vacant for nine months, creating an upper house evenly divided between Democrats and Republicans, a new law was eventually passed that allowed State Senate and Assembly seats to be filled in a Special Election that was not necessarily held at the same time as a regularly scheduled General Election. That remained in effect until the late 1980s, when a new law allowed the party organization to fill the seat until the next General Election.

In 2006, New Jersey Attorney General Zulima Farber issued an opinion stating that the gubernatorial line of succession did not become effective just because the Governor touched the soil of another state. This was done to benefit Governor Jon Corzine, who occasionally stayed overnight at the Manhattan apartment of his girlfriend.

Political offices
Preceded by Thomas J. Hillery	President of the New Jersey Senate; 1962	Succeeded by Frank S. Farley
