= John A. Waddington =

American politician

Member of the New Jersey Senate
- In office January 10, 1956 – January 9, 1968
- Preceded by: John M. Summerill, Jr.
- Succeeded by: Frank S. Farley (redistricting)
- Constituency: Salem County (1956–66); 2nd district (1966–68)

New Jersey State Senate Minority Leader
- In office January 1958 – January 1959
- Succeeded by: Joseph W. Cowgill
- In office January 1965 – January 1966

New Jersey Senate Majority Leader
- In office January 1967 – January 1968
- Preceded by: Sido L. Ridolfi
- Succeeded by: Frank X. McDermott

Member of the New Jersey General Assembly from Salem County
- In office January 12, 1954 – January 10, 1956
- Preceded by: Peter B. Hoff
- Succeeded by: John W. Davis

Personal details
- Born: John A. Waddington; May 10, 1911 Salem, New Jersey, U.S.
- Died: June 4, 1981 (aged 70) Salem, New Jersey, U.S.
- Party: Democratic
- Spouse: Kathryn Mulhern Waddington
- Education: University of Delaware

John A. Waddington (May 10, 1911 – June 4, 1981) was an American Democratic Party politician who served as Majority Leader of the New Jersey State Senate.

== Early life ==
He was a graduate of the University of Delaware. He was a teacher at Salem High School, and later worked as a personnel director for the du Pont Corporation of Delaware As a Quaker, Waddington claimed a religious exemption during World War II. After the war, he did relief and rehabilitation work in Italy with the American Friends Service Committee (Quakers).

== New Jersey State Assemblyman ==
He was elected to the New Jersey General Assembly from the district encompassing Salem County in 1953. He defeated Republican Peter B. Hoff, who had served as an Assemblyman since 1944.

== New Jersey State Senator ==
Waddington was elected to the New Jersey State Senate in 1955, representing Salem County. He defeated incumbent Republican Senator John M. Summerill by 1,138 votes, 9,836 (53.05%) to 8,698 (46.92%). He was re-elected in 1959, defeating former Assemblyman Hoff (whom Waddington unseated in the 1953 Assembly race) by 4,043 votes, 12,215 (59.92%) to 8,172 (40.08%). He won a third term in 1963, defeating Republican Joseph Narrow by 5,253 votes, 13,665 (61.86%) to 8,412 (38.08%).

He had to run again in 1965 after the U.S. Supreme Court, in Reynolds v. Sims (more commonly known as One Man, One Vote), required redistricting by state legislatures for congressional districts to keep represented populations equal, as well as requiring both houses of state legislatures to have districts drawn that contained roughly equal populations, and to perform redistricting when needed. Because of its population, Salem and Cumberland counties were merged into one district (district 2) with one Senator. Cumberland County was represented by Senator Robert H. Weber, a Democrat from Greenwich Township. Since both Salem and Cumberland Counties were being merged, only one Democratic Senator could represent the party. In order to avoid a primary election fight between Waddington and Weber, the Democratic party bosses got together in a meeting and decided that Waddington would be the candidate. Weber was made Waddington's campaign manager. The Democrats, thinking that they had avoided a primary fight, were met with yet another surprise. Another Quaker who attended the Salem Friends Meeting with John Waddington, threw his hat in the ring in the Democratic Primary. He was Kenneth R. Jones of Greenwich. He was a school teacher from Bridgeton and had previously taught in Salem. He declared himself as an "Independent Democrat." Mr. Jones carried a lot of support amongst the school teachers in both counties. However, Waddington beat Jones soundly in the June primary with Jones getting just under 1000 votes as compared to Waddington getting over 3000 votes. In the general election, John A. Waddington defeated Cumberland County Republican Chairman John J. Spoltore, a former Mayor of Bridgeton, by 7,902 votes, 32,292 (56.92%) to 24,390 (42.99%). He won Salem County by a 2-1 margin, and carried Cumberland by a narrow 577 vote margin. Waddington served as Senate Minority Leader in 1958 and 1966, and as the Senate Majority Leader in 1967.

New rounds of court battles and redistricting forced Waddington to run again in 1967, in an election cycle that was less favorable toward Democrats (it was the mid-term election of the second term of Democratic Governor Richard J. Hughes). This time Waddington ran in the 3rd district, specifically Assembly district 3A, which included all of Salem County and part of Gloucester County. He was defeated by two-term Republican Assemblyman John L. White (R-Gloucester) by 4,830 votes, 28,456 (54.6%) to 23,635 (45.4%). Waddington won Salem County by 3,328 votes, but White's margin in the Gloucester County part of the district was 8,149.

== Salem County Freeholder ==
After losing his Senate seat, Waddington was elected to the Salem County Board of Freeholders and served as Freeholder Director.

== Candidate for Governor of New Jersey ==
In 1973, Waddington explored a bid for the Democratic nomination for Governor of New Jersey. He was one of five candidates to be interviewed by a special committee of ten Democratic County Chairmen formed by Democratic State Chairman Salvatore Bontempo in an effort to unite the party establishment behind a single challenger to Republican Governor William T. Cahill. Waddington decided against entering the race, which was ultimately won by Brendan Byrne.

== New Jersey Director of Motor Vehicles ==
Governor Byrne appointed him to serve as the Director of the New Jersey Division of Motor Vehicles in 1974. His nomination was confirmed by the State Senate 39-0.

== Death ==
Waddington died in 1981, at age 70.
