= Alfred C. Clapp =

American politician

Member of the New Jersey Senate from Essex County
- In office January 1948 – May 1953
- Preceded by: Roy V. Wright
- Succeeded by: Mark Anton

Judge of the New Jersey Superior Court
- In office May 1953 – December 1957

Personal details
- Born: Alfred Chapin Clapp; June 8, 1903 East Orange, New Jersey, U.S.
- Died: May 23, 1988 (aged 84) East Orange, New Jersey, U.S.
- Party: Republican
- Education: University of Vermont (BA); Harvard University (LLB)

Alfred Chapin Clapp (June 8, 1903 – May 23, 1988) was an American attorney, politician, and jurist who served as a member of the New Jersey Senate and as presiding judge of the Appellate Division of the New Jersey Superior Court.

== Early life and education ==
Clapp was born on June 8, 1903, in East Orange, New Jersey. His parents were Alfred Chapin Clapp and Anna Roth Clapp. His siblings included Margaret Clapp. He graduated from the University of Vermont in 1923 and from Harvard Law School in 1927.

== Career ==
He served as counsel to the New Jersey Legislature during the drafting of the 1944 State Constitution, and was a delegate to the New Jersey Constitutional Conventions in 1947 and 1966. From 1944 to 1953, he was an editor of the New Jersey Law Journal.

=== New Jersey Senate ===
Following the retirement of two-term State Senator Roy V. Wright in 1947, Clapp became a candidate for the State Senate. He was re-elected to a second term in 1951.

=== 1953 gubernatorial election ===
In 1953, with Governor Alfred Driscoll term-limited, Clapp sought the Republican nomination for governor of New Jersey. He secured the organization lines in Essex and Bergen counties, but dropped out of the race on February 28, 1953.

=== New Jersey Superior Court ===
Clapp resigned from the Senate in 1953 after Governor Driscoll nominated him to serve as a Superior Court Judge. He was the Presiding Judge of the Appellate Division. He resigned from the bench in 1957.

=== 1959 New Jersey Senate election ===
In 1959, Clapp again sought election to the New Jersey Senate. Essex County Republicans were divided into two factions; Clapp led a slate of reform candidates opposed to the Essex County Republican Chairman, William Yeomans. Clapp defeated Essex County Prosecutor Charles V. Webb, Jr. in the Republican primary, 31,551 (72%) to 12,177 (28%). Clapp's "Clean Government" slate of 12 Assembly candidates all won the primary against the organization ticket. His landslide victory in the 1959 primary paved the way for former Congressman Robert W. Kean to oust Yeomans in a race for Essex County Republican Chairman one week later. Among the political newcomers who ran on the Clapp ticket was C. Robert Sarcone.

Unable to unify the Republican Party after the primary, Clapp was defeated by Democratic incumbent Donal C. Fox. He lost by 14,582 votes, 126,800 (51.11%) to 112,218 (45.23%).

=== Academics ===
Clapp was the dean of the Rutgers University School of Law from 1951 to 1953, and also served as Essex County Bar Association president. He was the author of a seven-volume work, Wills and Administration in New Jersey, and the chairman of the New Jersey Supreme Court Civil Practice Committee from 1947 to 1987. On and off between 1929 and 1971, Clapp was a law professor at the Mercer Beasley School of Law and the Rutgers Law School. He was chairman of the New Jersey Institute for Continuing Legal Education from 1962 to 1986.

=== Later work ===
Clapp founded a law firm, Clapp & Eisenberg, in Newark, New Jersey. In 1977, he served as chairman of Thomas Kean's campaign for the Republican gubernatorial nomination.

== Personal life ==
He was married to Catharine Shotwell Clapp. They had four sons and seven grandchildren. Clapp died in 1988 at age 84.
