= Bruce A. Wallace =

American politician (1905–1977)

Member of the New Jersey Senate from Camden County
- In office 1942–1944
- Preceded by: Alfred E. Driscoll
- Succeeded by: John L. Morrissey
- In office 1948–1955
- Preceded by: John L. Morrissey
- Succeeded by: Joseph W. Cowgill

Personal details
- Born: April 20, 1905 Merchantville, New Jersey, U.S.
- Died: March 4, 1977 (aged 71) Woodbury, New Jersey, U.S.
- Party: Republican

Bruce A. Wallace (April 20, 1905 – March 4, 1977) was an American politician who served in the New Jersey Senate from 1942 to 1944 and from 1948 to 1955.

A resident of Cherry Hill, New Jersey, Wallace was raised in Merchantville, New Jersey, attended Camden High School and earned his degree in law from the South Jersey Law School (now part of Rutgers Law School).
