= Harold W. Hannold =

American politician (1911-1995)

Member of the New Jersey Senate from Gloucester County
- In office 1945–1959
- Preceded by: John G. Sholl
- Succeeded by: Thomas F. Connery

Personal details
- Born: December 20, 1911 Westville, New Jersey
- Died: March 7, 1995 (aged 83)
- Party: Republican

Harold W. Hannold (December 20, 1911 – March 7, 1995) was an American Republican Party politician who served in the New Jersey Senate from 1945 to 1959. He served as Senate President in 1952.

Hannold's first elected office above the municipal level was on the Gloucester County Board of Chosen Freeholders. After serving three terms in the New Jersey General Assembly and 14 years in the Senate, Hannold resigned from office in May 1959, after being appointed by Governor of New Jersey Robert B. Meyner to serve on the New Jersey State Parole Board.

Born in Westville, New Jersey, Hannold attended Woodbury Junior-Senior High School and the College of South Jersey (now Rutgers University–Camden), before receiving his law degree in 1934 at the South Jersey Law School (since renamed as Rutgers School of Law–Camden).

Hannold in the South Jersey Law School Yearbook "The Archive," 1934 (Rutgers University Libraries, Camden Special Collections)
