= Richard R. Stout =

Politician from New Jersey, United States (1912-1986)

President of the New Jersey Senate
- In office 1958
- Preceded by: Albert McCay
- Succeeded by: Wesley Lance

Member of the New Jersey Senate
- In office January 8, 1952 – January 8, 1974
- Preceded by: J. Stanley Herbert
- Succeeded by: Herbert J. Buehler
- Constituency: Monmouth County (1952–66); 5th district (1966–74)

Personal details
- Born: September 21, 1912 Ocean Grove, New Jersey, U.S.
- Died: October 16, 1986 (aged 74) Newark, New Jersey, U.S.
- Party: Republican

Richard R. Stout (September 21, 1912 – October 16, 1986) was an American politician who served in the New Jersey Senate from 1952 to 1974.

Born in the Ocean Grove section of Neptune Township, New Jersey, Stout attended Neptune High School, Lawrenceville School, Princeton University, and Newark Law School before becoming an attorney. His father, Richard W. Stout, was active in Republican Party politics and was elected as an alternate delegate to the 1936 Republican National Convention. He had also served in the U.S. Army during World War II from 1940 to 1946.

Stout first ran for the Senate in 1951 against incumbent Republican Senator J. Stanley Herbert with the support of the Monmouth County Republican Organization. He won the primary and subsequently the general election and represented the entire county from 1952 to 1966. During the 1958 session, he served as Senate President. After the 1965 elections which reorganized the Senate districts, he was elected at-large to the 5th district encompassing all of Monmouth and Ocean counties. In the 1967 and 1971 elections, he was elected at-large to the 5th district, only encompassing Monmouth County.

In the 1973 elections, Stout ran for reelection from the new 10th district comprising the southern shore communities of Monmouth County. He lost to Herbert J. Buehler by 10 points. He died of cardiac arrest on October 16, 1986, in Newark, New Jersey at age 74.
