= Thomas J. Hillery =

American politician

Member of the New Jersey Senate
- In office January 12, 1954 – January 9, 1968
- Preceded by: David Young III
- Succeeded by: Harry L. Sears; Joseph J. Maraziti
- Constituency: Morris County (1954–1966); District 10 (at-large) (1966–1968)

Member of the New Jersey General Assembly from the Morris district
- In office January 14, 1947 – January 12, 1954

Personal details
- Born: June 16, 1904 Boonton, New Jersey
- Died: December 1, 1991 (aged 87) Denville Township, New Jersey
- Party: Republican

Thomas J. Hillery Jr. (June 16, 1904 – December 1, 1991) was an American politician who served in the New Jersey General Assembly from 1947 to 1954 and in the New Jersey Senate from 1954 to 1968.

== Early life and education ==
Thomas J. Hillery Jr. was born on June 16, 1904, in Boonton, New Jersey to Thomas J. Hillery Sr. and Rose Hillery (née Mahoney), an artist. At the time, his father was a member of the New Jersey General Assembly, serving as one of two representatives from Morris County, and he was elected to represent the county in the New Jersey Senate that year. Thomas Sr. served in the Senate from 1905 until 1909 and served as Senate president in 1908 and served briefly as acting governor. Thomas Sr. was killed in an automobile accident in 1920.

His brother, Eugene, later became a county judge.

In 1961, he received an honorary Doctor of Laws degree from Seton Hall University alongside Sargent Shriver.

== Business career ==
In 1959, Hillery was the president of the George Bender Corporation, a manufacturer of metallic powders for decorative purposes, in Boonton.

== Political career ==
Prior to his election to the legislature, Hillery served as mayor of Boonton.

=== New Jersey General Assembly ===
Hillery was elected to the New Jersey General Assembly in 1946 and re-elected in 1947, 1949, and 1951.

In 1952, Hillery introduced an unsuccessful bill to require compulsory local referendums on slum clearance, urban development, and public housing projects. The bill was opposed by Newark mayor Ralph Villani, who called it a threat to urban renewal programs under the landmark federal Housing Act of 1949 and "a device that would pave the way for the real estate lobby to defeat any attempt by our cities to ride themselves of blighted and slum areas and to provide housing within the means of those who are not wealthy." The bill was also opposed by most of the state labor movement, who saw it as a threat to public contracts. The opposition was led by the state Building and Construction Trades Council, whose president Sal Maso tied it to a national movement by the "real estate lobby" to eliminate public housing. It was supported by the New Jersey Lumbermen's Association, an organization of lumber dealers, who called for similar legislation at the national level.

=== New Jersey Senate ===
In February 1953, Hillery announced his candidacy for New Jersey Senate. The incumbent Republican, David Young III of Towaco, announced two weeks later that he would not run for re-election. Hillery won the seat in the 1953 elections and was re-elected in 1957, 1961, and 1965. He was majority leader of the Senate in 1960 and president in 1967, during which time he also served as acting governor.

As senator, Hillery sponsored the New Jersey College Scholarship Act, expanding access to higher education for thousands of New Jersey students.

In 1961, while serving as acting governor with Robert B. Meyner out of the state, Hillery drew criticism from local residents for his failure to sign a bill which he had authored in the Senate barring the construction of a jetport in Morris County. A group of Morris County residents led by board of freeholders director Norman J. Griffiths traveled to Trenton to demonstrate in support of the bill.

During his final two years in office from 1966 to 1968, he also represented Sussex County alongside Milton Woolfenden, following the reapportionment of the Senate under a new mixed, multi-member district system. In 1967, the district was redrawn to exclude Sussex and two assemblymen, Harry L. Sears and Joseph J. Maraziti, and LeRoy Arlington Waite, a physician, ran in the primary to succeed Woolfenden. Hillery ultimately finished third in the primary behind Sears and Maraziti, losing his seat.

== Personal life and death ==
Hillery was a lifelong bachelor. He enjoyed painting landscapes with oils and watercolors from a very young age. In 1959, thirty-eight of his paintings, including depictions of the Place Vendôme and the Giralda from his travels to Europe, were exhibited at the New Jersey State Museum.

Hillery died of cardiac arrest on December 1, 1991, in Denville Township, New Jersey at age 87.
