= W. Steelman Mathis =

American politician (1898–1981)

Member of the New Jersey Senate from Ocean County
- In office 1941–1942
- Succeeded by: Thomas A. Mathis
- In office 1947–1966
- Preceded by: Thomas A. Mathis
- Succeeded by: William T. Hiering (redistricting)

Personal details
- Born: December 1, 1898 Tuckerton, New Jersey
- Died: September 19, 1981 (aged 82) Toms River, New Jersey
- Party: Republican

William Steelman Mathis (December 1, 1898 – September 19, 1981) was an American politician who served in the New Jersey Senate from 1941 to 1942 and 1947 to 1966.

A resident of Toms River, New Jersey, Mathis was born in Tuckerton and was a graduate of Toms River High School (since renamed as Toms River High School South) and Peddie School.
