= George B. Harper =

American politician (1918–1988)

New Jersey State Auditor
- In office 1964–1981

Member of the New Jersey Senate from Sussex County
- In office January 1954 – 1964
- Preceded by: Alfred B. Littell
- Succeeded by: Milton Woolfenden Jr.

Personal details
- Born: December 5, 1918 Hackensack, New Jersey, U.S.
- Died: March 1, 1988 (aged 69) Layton, New Jersey, U.S.
- Party: Republican
- Education: Princeton University

George B. Harper Sr. (December 5, 1918 – March 1, 1988) was an American Republican Party politician who served in the New Jersey Senate from 1954 to 1964. He was the son of baseball pitcher Harry Harper.

A 1941 graduate of Princeton University, Harper served in the New Jersey Senate from 1954 to 1964, representing Sussex County. He resigned from office to become the New Jersey State Auditor, serving in that role until 1981. Harper died on March 1, 1988, at his home in the Layton section of Sandyston Township.
