= Joseph W. Cowgill =

American politician (1908–1986)

Member of the New Jersey Senate from Camden County
- In office 1956–1964
- Preceded by: Bruce A. Wallace
- Succeeded by: Frederick J. Scholz

Camden County Freeholder
- In office 1953–1956

Personal details
- Born: April 24, 1908
- Died: November 19, 1986 (aged 78)
- Party: Democratic

Joseph William Cowgill (April 24, 1908 – November 19, 1986) was an American Democratic Party politician who served as the Minority Leader of the New Jersey Senate.

Born in Camden, New Jersey on April 24, 1908, he graduated in 1925 from Camden High School, was a 1929 graduate of the University of Pennsylvania and a 1933 graduate of the University of Pennsylvania Law School.

He was elected to the New Jersey General Assembly representing Camden County in 1940. He did not seek re-election to a second term in 1941, but instead ran for Camden County Surrogate (Probate Court Judge). He resigned as Surrogate in 1943 to join the U.S. Navy during World War II. Cowgill was an Assistant Camden County Prosecutor in 1945, and served as the Camden County Counsel from 1947 to 1953, and again from 1957 to 1960.

He was a Delegate to the 1947 New Jersey Constitutional Convention, and an Alternate Delegate to the 1956 Democratic National Convention. He was elected to the Camden County Board of Chosen Freeholders in 1952; he did not seek re-election in 1955, but instead ran for an open State Senate seat when Bruce A. Wallace retired. In a close race, Cowgill defeated Republican Haddon Township Mayor William G. Rohrer by 290 votes, 54,683 (50.02%) to 54,393 (49.76%). Cowgill again faced Rohrer when he sought re-election in 1959; this time, Cowgill won by 4,092 votes, 61,656 (51.72%) to 57,564 (48.28%). He served as the Senate Minority Leader from 1959 to 1964. In 1963, Cowgill was defeated for re-election to a third term as State Senator, losing to Republican Frederick Scholz by 13,627 votes, 72,873 (54.94%) to 59,246 (44.66%).
