= Kenneth Hand =

American judge

Member of the New Jersey Senate from Union County
- In office 1948–1956
- Preceded by: Herbert Pascoe
- Succeeded by: Robert C. Crane

Member of the New Jersey General Assembly
- In office 1929–1933
- In office 1943–1948

Personal details
- Born: May 6, 1899 Putnam, Connecticut, US
- Died: April 9, 1988 (aged 88) Wildwood, New Jersey, US
- Party: Republican

Kenneth Cromwell Hand (May 6, 1899 – April 9, 1988) was an American Republican Party politician and judge who served in the New Jersey State Senate. He was a candidate for the 1953 Republican nomination for Governor of New Jersey.

== Early life ==
Hand was born on May 6, 1899, in Putnam, Connecticut, the son of Rev. Aaron W. Hand (1855–1926) and Matilda Hand (1864–1938). Hand grew up in Keyport, New Jersey, where his father relocated to take a position as a Minister, and graduated from Keyport High School. He served in the U.S. Army during World War I, and graduated from Rutgers University in 1920. He received his law degree from Columbia University in 1923.

From 1925 to 1956, Hand practiced law in Elizabeth and Newark. He resided in Roselle, New Jersey before moving to Westfield, New Jersey.

== New Jersey Assemblyman ==
Hand was elected to the New Jersey General Assembly representing Union County in 1928, and was re-elected in 1929, 1930 and 1931.

In 1930, Hand led a revolt among legislators frustrated that party leadership were not advancing their bills for votes on the floor.

He ran again for Assemblyman in 1942, and was re-elected in 1943.

== Prosecutor ==
Hand served as an Assistant Union County Prosecutor, a part-time post, in 1944 and 1945.

== Candidate for Congress ==
Following the death of U.S. Rep. Ernest Robinson Ackerman in 1931, Hand became a candidate for the Republican nomination for the U.S. House of Representatives. He was defeated in a Special Primary Election by Donald H. McLean, a former Secretary to U.S. Senator John Kean. McLean, running as a supporter of Prohibition, or as a "Dry" candidate, received 8,811 votes; Hand, running as a "Wet" candidate supporting the repeal of Prohibition, received 6,707 votes. Hand beat McLean in the Union County portion of the district, but lost to him in Morris County. John E. Nicol received 4,828 votes, Wesley Stanger, a "Dry" Republican who had lost to Ackerman in 1930, finished last with 1,776 votes. The Special Primary was held on November 17, 1931, allowing Hand to successfully seek a fourth term as Assemblyman a few weeks earlier.

In 1932, U.S. Rep. Percy Hamilton Stewart (D-Plainfield), a "Dripping Wet" candidate, gave up his seat one year after narrowly defeating McLean in the December Special Election, to run for the United States Senate. Hand and McLean again faced off in a Republican Primary, with McLean winning by slightly more than 10,000 votes—22,784 to 12,756. Hand gave up his Assembly seat to run for Congress.

== New Jersey State Senator ==
When State Senator Herbert Pascoe retired in 1947, Hand became a candidate for the Senate. He defeated former Assemblywoman Irene Griffin in the Republican primary and easily won the General Election. He was re-elected in 1951 and 1955. His re-election in 1955 was by a 54%-46% margin against Democrat Robert Sheldon.

He was the Chairman of the Joint Appropriations Committee of the New Jersey Legislature in 1954.

== Candidate for Governor ==
In 1953, Hand sought the Republican nomination for Governor of New Jersey. He finished third in a field of seven candidates, with 4% of the vote. In that primary, former New Jersey Turnpike Authority Chairman Paul L. Troast defeated State Senator Malcolm Forbes by a 52%-39% margin.

== Judge ==
Hand resigned from the Senate in 1956 when Governor Robert B. Meyner appointed him to serve as a New Jersey Superior Court Judge. He remained on the bench until his retirement in 1969.

== Family and death ==
His first wife, Ruth Gremmels Hand, died in 1950 at age 43. He later married Louise Dunden Dealaan, who died in 1964. He adopted her daughter, Louise Teel Dealaman Hand, known as Teel (1945–1980).

Hand spent his retirement years living in Wildwood, New Jersey. He died on April 9, 1988, at age 88. He is buried at the Evergreen Cemetery in Hillside, New Jersey.
