= Sido L. Ridolfi =

American politician (1913–2004)

Member of the New Jersey Senate
- In office January 12, 1954 – January 11, 1972
- Preceded by: J. Richard Kafes
- Succeeded by: At-large seats eliminated
- Constituency: Mercer County (1954-1966); 6th district (1966-1968); 6th district (at-large) (1968-1972)

Personal details
- Born: September 28, 1913 Trenton, New Jersey, U.S.
- Died: May 9, 2004 (aged 90) Robbinsville Township, New Jersey, U.S.
- Party: Democratic
- Spouse: Beatrice Ridolfi
- Education: Princeton University (1936); Harvard Law School (1939)

Military service
- Allegiance: United States of America
- Branch/service: United States Coast Guard
- Years of service: 1942 – 1945
- Battles/wars: World War II

Sido Louis Ridolfi (September 28, 1913 – May 9, 2004) was an American Democratic Party politician who served in the New Jersey Senate from 1954 to 1972, serving as Senate President in 1967.

== Early life ==
Ridolfi was born in 1913 in Trenton, New Jersey. He attended Trenton Central High School and graduated from Princeton University in 1936, where he majored in politics. He graduated from Harvard Law School in 1939.

== Senate and gubernatorial staff ==
In 1941 Ridolfi was appointed Secretary to the New Jersey Senate Minority Leader. He served as a legislative advisor to Governor Charles Edison from 1941 to 1942. He left his post to join the United States Coast Guard in World War II.

== Local and county elected offices ==
In 1947 he was elected Sheriff of Mercer County, New Jersey. He was elected City Commissioner of Trenton in 1951, reelected in 1955.

He was first elected to the State Senate in 1953, defeating Assistant Mercer County Prosecutor Arthur Stephen Lane. Ridolfi and Lane had attended Princeton and Harvard Law at the same time. He was re-elected in 1957, 1961, 1965 and 1967. In 1967 he served as Senate President and Acting Governor. Prior to 1966, he represented Mercer County in the Senate; in 1965 he was elected to the new 6th Legislative District which coincidentally encompassed all of Mercer County. In the 1967 election, Ridolfi was elected to one of two at-large Senate seats in the 6th district, also elected was Democrat Richard J. Coffee.

== Alleged ties to organized crime ==
In December 1968, Assistant New Jersey Attorney General William Brennan III (son of Supreme Court Associate Justice William J. Brennan, Jr.) gave a speech alleging that three incumbent state legislators were "entirely too comfortable with organized crime." The legislators were later revealed to be Ridolfi and Assemblymen David Friedland and John A. Selecky. Ridolfi was accused of assisting in the purchase of a house for John Simone (aka "Johnny Keys"), a Philadelphia capo and cousin of mob boss Angelo Bruno. He was also accused of land dealings with Edmund Bralynski (aka "Big Brownie"), identified by state law enforcement officials as "a top rackets figure in Trenton."

On January 14, 1969, a special legislative investigating committee expressed "disapproval" of Ridolfi and Selecky. The committee reported, "While Senator Ridolfi has done nothing illegal, his actions have reflected adversely on the Legislature."

== Later life ==
Ridolfi retired from the Senate to continue his private legal practice, and after redistricting the 6th district was split into two separate seats.

He died on May 9, 2004, at the age of 90 at Rosehill Assisted Living in Robbinsville Township, New Jersey.

Political offices
Preceded by John A. Lynch, Sr.	President of the New Jersey Senate; 1967	Succeeded by Edwin B. Forsythe
