= Albert McCay =

American politician (1901-1969)

Member of the New Jersey State Senate from Burlington County
- In office 1952–1960
- Preceded by: James M. Davis Jr.
- Succeeded by: Henry S. Haines

Member of the New Jersey State Assembly
- In office 1944–1948

Personal details
- Born: 1901 Philadelphia, Pennsylvania, U.S.
- Died: 1969 (aged 67–68)
- Party: Republican

Albert McCay (1901–1969) was a Republican Party politician who served in the New Jersey General Assembly from 1944 to 1948 and in the New Jersey Senate from 1952 to 1960.

Born in Philadelphia, McCay was raised in Mansfield Township, Burlington County, New Jersey and Burlington, New Jersey. McCay graduated from the Temple University Beasley School of Law in 1929. He lived with his wife and children in Palmyra, New Jersey and then Delanco Township, New Jersey.

== Elected office ==
He served in the New Jersey General Assembly from 1944 to 1948 and was chosen as speaker. He was elected to the New Jersey Senate, serving from 1952 to 1960. In the Senate, McCay was chosen as Senate President for the 1957 session.

In 1958, McCay used Senatorial courtesy to block the renomination of New Jersey Attorney General Grover C. Richman Jr., refusing to explain why he was unwilling to allow Richman to be renominated to a second four-year term as Attorney General and stating that he would only disclose his justifications if he was granted subpoena power to compel the testimony of uncooperative witnesses who would be able to confirm his claims. Despite sharp criticism from Governor Robert B. Meyner, McCay held firm and the Senate backed him up, leading Richman to withdraw his name from consideration.
