= 1958 United States Senate election in New Jersey =

- November 4, 1958
- Turnout: 72% (▼17pp)
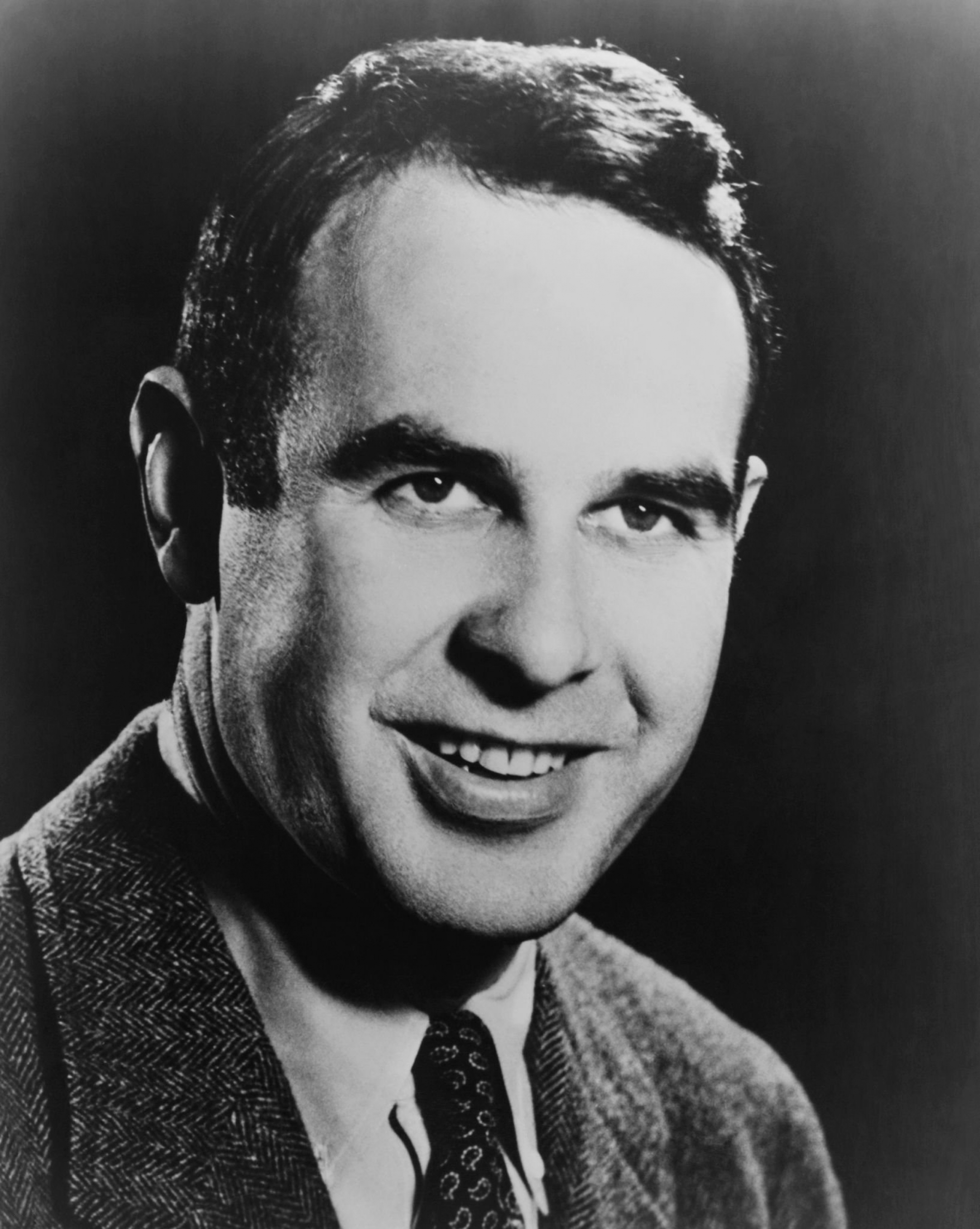

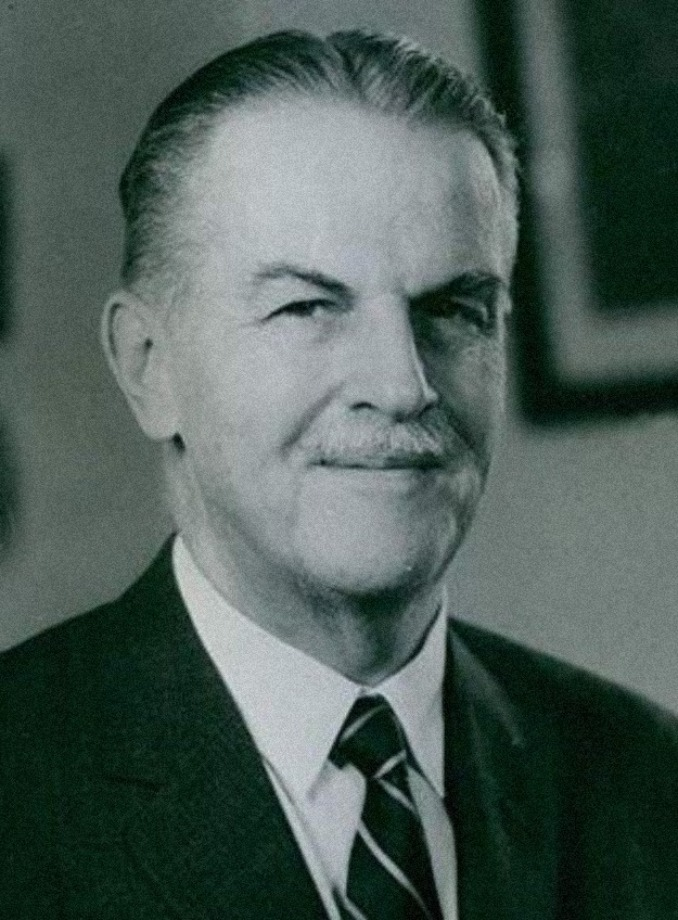
Nominee	Harrison Williams	Robert Kean
Party	Democratic	Republican
Popular vote	966,832	882,287
Percentage	51.39%	46.90%
- County results Williams: 40–50% 50–60% 60–70% Kean: 40–50% 50–60% 60–70%
U.S. senator before election
H. Alexander Smith
Republican
Elected U.S. Senator
Harrison Williams
Democratic

The 1958 United States Senate election in New Jersey was held on November 4, 1958. Republican incumbent H. Alexander Smith retired. Democratic former U.S. representative Harrison Williams won the open seat over U.S. representative Robert Kean.

Primary elections were held on April 15. Kean defeated Eisenhower aide Bernard M. Shanley and Robert J. Morris, while Williams narrowly defeated Hoboken mayor John Grogan. The six total candidates running in the two primaries was the most since open primaries were established in 1913.

Williams was the first Democrat elected to the U.S. Senate from New Jersey since 1936; as of 2026, Democrats have won every subsequent election to this seat.

== Background ==
Republican incumbent H. Alexander Smith had first been elected to the United States Senate in 1944. Entering 1957, he was 77 years old and

== Republican primary ==
=== Candidates ===
- Robert Kean, U.S. representative from Livingston and son of former U.S. senator Hamilton F. Kean
- Robert J. Morris, chief counsel to the United States Senate Subcommittee on Internal Security
- Bernard M. Shanley, White House aide to Dwight D. Eisenhower

==== Withdrew ====
- H. Alexander Smith, incumbent U.S. senator since 1944 (withdrew November 26, 1957; endorsed Kean)

==== Declined ====
- C. Douglas Dillon, U.S. Undersecretary of State for Economic Affairs
- Wayne Dumont, state senator from Warren County
- Peter Frelinghuysen Jr., U.S. representative from Morristown
- Walter H. Jones, state senator from Bergen County (declined February 28, 1958)
- James P. Mitchell, U.S. secretary of labor

=== Campaign ===
In June 1957, Robert Kean announced that he was likely to challenge incumbent H. Alexander Smith. Kean, who was 65 years old, viewed 1958 as his last opportunity to run for an office once held by his father and uncle, given that New Jersey's junior senator, Clifford Case, was eleven years younger than Kean. His announcement took Smith by surprise, and Smith announced that he would stand for re-election. On November 7, immediately after Democratic governor Robert Meyner won re-election in a surprising landslide, Eisenhower aide Bernard M. Shanley joined the race, resigning as White House appointments secretary to run. Smith announced that he would meet with party leaders to stave off a divisive primary contest, but following the conference, Smith announced that he would not seek re-election.

Robert Morris entered the race on January 11, announcing a campaign focused on anti-communism and resistance to Soviet influence, arguing, "The primary issue today is our survival as a free nation." Morris presented himself as the only conservative in the race and attributed the ongoing economic recession and inflation to foreign aid and defense spending, which he argued was necessary because of bipartisan vacillation in the face of Russian imperialism. To combat the recession, he proposed an immediate cut in income and excise taxes. He also argued for a "big tent" approach to politics and posited that Republicans' defeat in the 1957 elections was the result of feuds between Eisenhower and conservative senators Joseph McCarthy and Robert A. Taft.

Kean formally announced his campaign on January 30, 1958, emphasizing international peace built on a military "strong enough to deter any possible aggressor" and "a healthy, expanding national economy with a stable dollar." On domestic issues, Kean campaigned on a liberal platform. He ran on his record of tax reduction, Social Security liberalization, and reductions in trade barriers, and called for further spending on public works and military aid to counter Soviet expansion but warned against "pump-priming" New Deal-era measures. Because of his busy schedule, which included a tour of all twenty-one counties, his sons, Robert Jr., Hamilton, and future governor Thomas Kean, campaigned on his behalf.

In an appeal to the state's large commuter population, Shanley proposed a constitutional amendment barring any state from taxing residents of another state.

Entering election day, George Cable of The New York Times reported Shanley had a "definite edge," with Kean running a close second, and Morris expected to pull more votes from Shanley than Kean.

=== Endorsements ===
Robert Kean

Elected officials

- H. Alexander Smith, incumbent Senator

Newspapers

- The New York Times
Bernard Shanley

County party organizations

- Bergen County Republican Organization

=== Results ===
1958 Republican U.S. Senate primary
Party	Candidate	Votes	%
Republican	Robert Kean	152,884	43.00%
Republican	Bernard M. Shanley	128,990	36.28%
Republican	Robert J. Morris	73,658	20.72%
Total votes		355,532	100.00%

Kean won the primary over Shanley by a margin under 24,000 votes, owing to a margin of nearly 33,000 votes from his native Essex County alone. Both Shanley and Morris conceded the primary race on election night and endorsed Kean.

== Democratic primary ==
=== Candidates ===
- John J. Grogan, mayor of Hoboken and president of the Shipyard Workers Union
- Joseph E. McLean, New Jersey commissioner of conservation and economic development and former Princeton University professor
- Harrison A. Williams, former U.S. representative from Plainfield

==== Withdrew ====
- Thorn Lord, chair of the Mercer County Democratic Organization, member of the Port of New York Authority, and former U.S. attorney for the district of New Jersey (withdrew March 4)
- James F. Murray Jr., Jersey City commissioner and former state senator (withdrew March 4 to run for U.S. House; endorsed McLean)
- John J. Winberry, former New Jersey deputy attorney general and nominee for U.S. House in 1952 (ran as independent)

==== Declined ====
- Archibald S. Alexander, former New Jersey treasurer, U.S. Army undersecretary, and nominee for U.S. Senate in 1948 and 1952 (endorsed Williams)

The first Democratic candidate to announce was Hoboken mayor John Grogan, who announced his campaign the race on January 22, 1958, with the support of the powerful but fading Hudson County political machine. Hudson County typically accounted for 40 percent of the Democratic primary vote and had decided the Democratic nominee in every race for the past sixty years, but the machine was fading after boss Frank Hague failed to deliver the 1949 gubernatorial election for his preferred candidate.

Another eight candidates, led by Harrison Williams and Thorn Lord, vied for the support of the state party establishment and vowed to drop out in favor of the party's choice. Meyner aide Joseph McLean also entered the race as an outsider candidate.

=== Campaign ===
In late February, Democratic leadership culled the field to select an establishment choice, with Harrison Williams and Thorn Lord leading a field of ten candidates. Grogan, who staked his chances on the support of the Hudson County machine, and McLean, who expected to run an independent campaign without any organization support, both promised to force a primary regardless of the establishment choice. With Lord having a slight majority of support from party leadership, the party empowered Governor Robert B. Meyner to choose a candidate. On March 4, Meyner endorsed Williams, who consequently received the support of all county party organizations except Hudson County, which maintained support for Grogan. Efforts to persuade Grogan to withdraw by offering him a seat in the U.S. House failed after negotiations broke down between Meyner, Grogan, and Hudson County boss William F. Kelly.

Ultimately, the campaign was a contest between the state party organization and the Hudson County machine. Meyner campaigned for Williams in Edison, Livingston, Nutley, and Caldwell. Williams proposed expanded federal transportation programs and increases in federal unemployment benefits to combat the recession.

Grogan campaigned in every county, presenting himself as the most liberal and most anti-communist candidate. He proposed a tax cut and increased spending on unemployment benefits, public works, and pensions. Grogan had the full support of organized labor and coaxed the endorsement of the Camden party organization away from Williams, against the wishes of Camden mayor George E. Brunner.

McLean emphasized his independence by resisting pleas to abandon his campaign and arguing that the race was actually between himself and Grogan. He proposed a tax cut and robust national defense spending for the nuclear age. Within Hudson County, he had the support of machine opponents and reformers, including Jersey City mayor Charles S. Witkowski and former state senator James F. Murray Jr.

In the final week of the campaign, Williams made a pair of campaign stops in Hudson County. Grogan won a late victory by flipping the Atlantic County party organization in the final week. As the campaign closed, it was regarded as a close contest and a test of the prestige of both Meyner and the Hudson County machine. Meyner declined to predict the result on election day and disclaimed the election as any test of his political strength. George Cable of The New York Times considered Grogan a slight favorite but said, "a victory by Mr. Williams would surprise no observers."

=== Endorsements ===
John Grogan

Individuals

- Louis P. Marciante, president of the New Jersey Federation of Labor

Labor unions

- New Jersey Congress of Industrial Organizations (NJCIO)

County party organizations

- Atlantic County Democratic Organization
- Hudson County Democratic Organization

Local party organizations

- Camden City Democratic Organization
Joseph McLean

Public officials

- Charles S. Witkowski, mayor of Jersey City
- James F. Murray Jr., Jersey City commissioner and former state senator

Organizations

- Victory, an anti-Hudson County machine activist group
Harrison Williams

Elected officials

- Robert Meyner, incumbent governor of New Jersey
- George E. Brunner, mayor of Camden

Newspapers

- The New York Times

County party organizations

- Bergen County Democratic Organization
- Burlington County Democratic Organization
- Cape May County Democratic Organization
- Cumberland County Democratic Organization
- Essex County Democratic Organization
- Gloucester County Democratic Organization
- Hunterdon County Democratic Organization
- Mercer County Democratic Organization
- Middlesex County Democratic Organization
- Monmouth County Democratic Organization
- Morris County Democratic Organization
- Ocean County Democratic Organization
- Passaic County Democratic Organization
- Salem County Democratic Organization
- Somerset County Democratic Organization
- Sussex County Democratic Organization
- Union County Democratic Organization
- Warren County Democratic Organization

=== Results ===
1958 Democratic U.S. Senate primary
Party	Candidate	Votes	%
Democratic	Harrison A. Williams	152,413	43.12%
Democratic	John Grogan	139,605	39.49%
Democratic	Joseph E. McLean	61,478	17.39%
Total votes		353,496	100.00%

Williams was the first candidate to win a Democratic nomination in New Jersey without the support of the Hudson County machine since the 1898 gubernatorial election. He attributed his victory directly to Meyner's support. Grogan carried Hudson County over McLean by a wide margin and pulled out narrow victories in Atlantic and Camden, where he had been endorsed late in the race.

== General election ==
=== Candidates ===
- John M. D'Addetta, resident of Hoboken (People's Choice)
- Robert Kean, U.S. representative from Livingston (Republican)
- Henry Krajewski, Secaucus resident and perennial candidate (Politicians are Jokers)
- Winifred O. Perry, Montclair resident and perennial candidate (Conservative)
- Albert Ronis, Bridgeton resident and perennial candidate (Socialist Labor)
- Daniel Roberts, resident of Newark (Socialist Workers)
- Harrison A. Williams, former U.S. representative from Plainfield (Democratic)
- John J. Winberry, former New Jersey deputy attorney general and Democratic nominee for U.S. House in 1952 (Independent)

=== Campaign ===
Kean began the race as the favorite but faced immediate political headwinds, as well as an energetic campaign from Williams and Governor Meyner. Kean also struggled with divisions in his own party after party chairman Samuel L. Bodine died unexpectedly of a heart problem, leaving a vacancy with no clear successor. Bodine's death led to an intraparty struggle between regional and ideological factions led by Clifford Case, Richard Stout, Walter H. Jones, Frank S. Farley, and Malcolm Forbes. At Kean's request, Smith, the incumbent senator, was named a temporary placeholder.

=== Results ===
General election results
Party	Candidate	Votes	%	±%
Democratic	Harrison A. Williams	966,832	51.39%	▲7.77
Republican	Robert Kean	882,287	46.90%	▼8.61
Socialist Workers	Daniel Roberts	11,669	0.62%	▲0.40
Independent	Henry Krajewski	6,013	0.32%	N/A
Independent	John J. Winberry	5,481	0.29%	N/A
Conservative	Winifred O. Perry	3,062	0.16%	N/A
Independent	John M. D'Addetta	3,024	0.16%	N/A
Socialist Labor	Albert Ronis	2,935	0.16%	▲0.09
Total votes		1,881,303	100.00%	
Democratic gain from Republican				

== See also ==
- 1958 United States Senate elections
