= 1961 United States gubernatorial elections =

| ← 1960 | November 7, 1961 | 1962 → |

2 governorships
| | Majority party | Minority party |
|---|---|---|
| Party | Democratic | Republican |
| Seats before | 34 | 16 |
| Seats after | 34 | 16 |
| Seat change | Steady | Steady |
| Seats up | 2 | 0 |
| Seats won | 2 | 0 |
- Democratic holds

United States gubernatorial elections were held on 7 November 1961, in two states, New Jersey and Virginia. The elections did not result in any change of balance between Republican and Democratic seats.

== Results ==
| State | Incumbent | Party | Status | Opposing candidates |
|---|---|---|---|---|
| New Jersey | Robert B. Meyner | Democratic | Term-limited, Democratic victory | Richard J. Hughes (Democratic) 50.37% James P. Mitchell (Republican) 48.74% Reinhardt V. Metzger (Conservative) 0.27% Henry B. Krajewski (Veterans Bonus Now) 0.18% Edward J. Lueddeke (Prosperity with Liberty) 0.12% G. George Addonizio (Independent) 0.11% Albert Ronis (Socialist Labor) 0.10% Daniel Petrino (State Soldiers Bonus) 0.07% Ruth F. Shiminsky (Socialist Workers) 0.05% |
| Virginia | J. Lindsay Almond | Democratic | Term-limited, Democratic victory | Albertis Harrison (Democratic) 63.85% H. Clyde Pearson (Republican) 36.14% Write-ins 0.02% |
