= 1969 New Jersey gubernatorial election =

- November 4, 1969
- Turnout: 74.2% of eligible voters (▲1.5 pp)
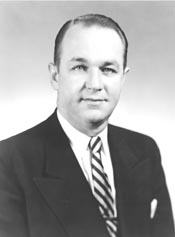

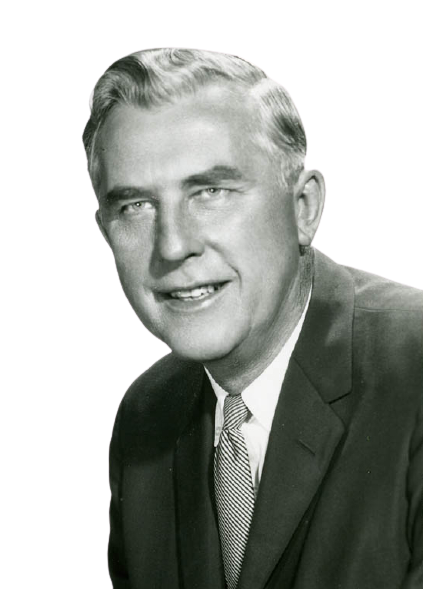
| Nominee | William T. Cahill | Robert B. Meyner |
| Party | Republican | Democratic |
| Popular vote | 1,411,905 | 911,003 |
| Percentage | 59.66% | 38.49% |
- County results Cahill: 50–60% 60–70% Meyner: 50–60%
Governor before election
Richard J. Hughes
Democratic
Elected Governor
William T. Cahill
Republican

The 1969 New Jersey gubernatorial election was held on November 4, 1969. Republican nominee William T. Cahill defeated Democratic nominee Robert B. Meyner with 59.66% of the vote. This was the only gubernatorial election that Republicans won between 1949 and 1981.

Primary elections were held on June 3. Turnout in the primary was approximately 24 percent of the registered voter population. Cahill won the Republican nomination narrowly over fellow South Jersey Congressman Charles W. Sandman Jr., while Meyner finished with nearly twice the vote of his closest competitor, state senator William F. Kelly of Hudson County.

This is the first gubernatorial election in which a Republican won Hudson County.

== Background ==
Entering the 1969 campaign, New Jersey was seen as a swing state with a moderate Republican lean. President Richard Nixon had narrowly carried the state over Hubert H. Humphrey in the presidential election the prior year. However, the state had not elected a Republican governor since 1949. Robert B. Meyner (1954–62) and Richard J. Hughes (1962–70) had each been elected to the maximum of two consecutive terms; Hughes was constitutionally prohibited from running for a third term in office in 1969.

In 1967, Republicans made major gains in the legislative midterm, winning veto-proof majorities in the New Jersey Senate and General Assembly.

== Democratic primary ==
=== Candidates ===
- Henry Helstoski, U.S. representative from East Rutherford
- John L. Hennessey, Sea Bright tavern owner
- William F. Kelly, state senator from Hudson County
- Robert B. Meyner, former Governor of New Jersey
- Ned J. Parsekian, former state senator from Bergen County
- D. Louis Tonti, director of the New Jersey Highway Authority

=== Campaign ===
The Democratic primary was a battleground for multiple political forces within the party. Meyner ran as an opponent of the Hudson County machine with the backing of most of the party establishment and critics of the Hudson machine, as he had in 1953. Hudson, led by John V. Kenny as the successor to Frank Hague, supported their native son, state senator William F. Kelly. In addition to the geographic dynamic, congressman Henry Helstoski joined the campaign at the eleventh hour, filing just thirty minutes before the deadline as the candidate of the New Democratic Coalition, a liberal reformist organization opposed to American involvement in the Vietnam War and founded by supporters of Eugene McCarthy and Robert F. Kennedy. Helstoski offered another alternative to the Hudson County machine for liberals dissatisfied with Meyner's relatively conservative record as governor. Ned Parsekian also ran as a liberal without party support, focusing on his opposition to organized crime and corruption by government officials. Finally, D. Louis Tonti ran with the support of the state's large ethnic Italian community, the biggest ethnic voting bloc in the state at the time and whose backing was generally regarded as vital for primary and general elections.

Kelly spent significant sums on television commercials and newspaper advertisements, leading establishment politicians in the legislature to take him seriously as the chief opponent to Meyner. Each of the challengers charged that Meyner was a "political retread" and had a number of conflicts of interest that would prevent him from serving as governor.

=== Results ===
Meyner ultimately won an easy victory over his opposition, which was taken as a victory for the party establishment over the Hudson County machine and liberal wing of the party. At his campaign headquarters, Meyner questioned a remark that his nomination represented a political "comeback".

Primary results by county Meyner: 30–40% 40–50% 50–60% 60–70% 70–80% 80–90% Kelly: 60–70% Helstoski: 40–50%

Democratic Party primary results
| Party | Candidate | Votes | % |
|---|---|---|---|
| Democratic | Robert B. Meyner | 173,801 | 44.77 |
| Democratic | William F. Kelly | 87,888 | 22.64 |
| Democratic | Henry Helstoski | 60,483 | 15.58 |
| Democratic | D. Louis Tonti | 34,810 | 8.97 |
| Democratic | Ned J. Parsekian | 24,908 | 6.42 |
| Democratic | John L. Hennessey | 6,302 | 1.62 |
| Total votes | | 388,192 | 100.00 |

== Republican primary ==
=== Candidates ===
- William T. Cahill, U.S. representative from Collingswood
- Frank X. McDermott, state senator from Union County and President of the New Jersey Senate
- William E. Ozzard, Public Utilities Commissioner and former state senator from Somerset County
- Charles W. Sandman Jr., U.S. representative from Cape May
- Harry L. Sears, state senator from Morris County

=== Campaign ===
Charles Sandman, who had narrowly lost the 1965 Republican primary to Wayne Dumont Jr., was initially considered the prohibitive favorite for the nomination as the lone conservative in a field with four moderate or liberal candidates who had never run for statewide office. His policy proposals dominated the debate, including a pledge not to initiate a state income tax and promises to crack down on street crime and campus protests.

Late in the campaign, however, Cahill consolidated support from the moderate wing of the party led by U.S. Senator Clifford P. Case. Both Sandman and Cahill were accused of owning property encumbered by racially restrictive covenants, generating commotion among moderates.

=== Results ===
Primary results by county Cahill: 40–50% 50–60% 60–70% 70–80% 80–90% Sandman: 30–40% 40–50% 50–60% 60–70% 70–80% 80–90% Sears: 40–50% 60–70% McDermott: 40–50% Ozzard: 40–50%

Republican primary results
| Party | Candidate | Votes | % |
|---|---|---|---|
| Republican | William T. Cahill | 158,980 | 39.31 |
| Republican | Charles W. Sandman Jr. | 144,877 | 35.83 |
| Republican | Harry L. Sears | 46,778 | 11.57 |
| Republican | Frank X. McDermott | 35,503 | 8.78 |
| Republican | William E. Ozzard | 18,262 | 4.52 |
| Total votes | | 404,400 | 100.00 |

== General election ==
=== Candidates ===
- William T. Cahill, U.S. Representative from Collingswood (Republican)
- Robert B. Meyner, former Governor of New Jersey (Democratic)
- James E. Johnson (Independent)
- Jack D. Alvino (Independent)
- Winifred O. Perry (Conservative)
- Louis Vanderplate (Independent)
- Jules Levin, perennial candidate (Socialist Labor)

=== Results ===
New Jersey gubernatorial election, 1969
| Party | Candidate | Votes | % | ±% |
|---|---|---|---|---|
| Republican | William T. Cahill | 1,411,905 | 59.66% | ▲18.58 |
| Democratic | Robert B. Meyner | 911,003 | 38.49% | ▼18.90 |
| Independent | James E. Johnson | 10,725 | 0.45% | N/A |
| Independent | Jack D. Alvino | 10,149 | 0.43% | N/A |
| Conservative | Winifred O. Perry | 10,128 | 0.43% | ▼0.47 |
| Independent | Louis Vanderplate | 6,611 | 0.28% | N/A |
| Socialist Labor | Julius Levin | 6,085 | 0.26% | ▲0.05 |
| Total votes | | 2,366,606 | 100.00% | |
| Republican gain from Democratic | | Swing | | |

==== By county ====
| County | Cahill % | Cahill votes | Meyner % | Meyner votes | Other % | Other votes |
|---|---|---|---|---|---|---|
| Atlantic | 60.1% | 37,662 | 36.7% | 23,004 | 3.2% | 2,030 |
| Bergen | 62.8% | 218,908 | 35.7% | 124,304 | 1.6% | 5,458 |
| Burlington | 60.9% | 48,240 | 37.9% | 30,005 | 1.2% | 933 |
| Camden | 65.9% | 95,170 | 33.0% | 47,667 | 1.1% | 1,477 |
| Cape May | 63.6% | 14,532 | 35.2% | 8,050 | 1.3% | 274 |
| Cumberland | 59.6% | 21,348 | 40.0% | 14,340 | 0.4% | 143 |
| Essex | 51.8% | 147,188 | 46.2% | 131,479 | 2.1% | 5,681 |
| Gloucester | 62.7% | 35,255 | 36.4% | 20,446 | 0.9% | 511 |
| Hudson | 56.8% | 116,066 | 41.8% | 85,379 | 1.5% | 3,018 |
| Hunterdon | 68.6% | 15,830 | 30.5% | 7,047 | 0.9% | 209 |
| Mercer | 51.3% | 52,041 | 46.7% | 47,421 | 1.9% | 1,995 |
| Middlesex | 59.7% | 114,446 | 38.2% | 73,171 | 2.1% | 4,011 |
| Monmouth | 64.5% | 89,957 | 34.0% | 47,407 | 1.4% | 2,003 |
| Morris | 67.0% | 84,144 | 31.5% | 38,613 | 1.6% | 1,843 |
| Ocean | 69.1% | 48,076 | 28.9% | 20,085 | 2.1% | 1,415 |
| Passaic | 55.1% | 81,079 | 42.0% | 61,816 | 2.9% | 4,320 |
| Salem | 60.9% | 13,182 | 38.8% | 8,389 | 0.4% | 72 |
| Somerset | 68.8% | 45,348 | 28.7% | 18,905 | 2.4% | 1,653 |
| Sussex | 65.7% | 16,275 | 31.5% | 7,800 | 2.8% | 704 |
| Union | 55.0% | 107,997 | 42.1% | 82,618 | 2.9% | 5,785 |
| Warren | 45.8% | 11,161 | 53.6% | 13,057 | 0.6% | 163 |

Counties that flipped from Democratic to Republican

- Atlantic
- Bergen
- Burlington
- Camden
- Cape May
- Cumberland
- Essex
- Gloucester
- Hudson
- Mercer
- Middlesex
- Monmouth
- Passaic
- Salem
- Somerset
- Union

Counties that flipped from Republican to Democratic

- Warren
