= 1953 United States gubernatorial elections =

- November 5, 1953

2 governorships
	Majority party	Minority party
Party	Republican	Democratic
Seats before	30	18
Seats after	29	19
Seat change	▼1	▲1
Seats up	1	1
Seats won	0	2
- Democratic hold Democratic gain

United States gubernatorial elections were held on November 3, 1953, in two states, New Jersey and Virginia.

== Race summary ==
=== Results ===
State	Incumbent	Party	First elected	Result	Candidates
New Jersey	Alfred E. Driscoll	Republican	1946	Incumbent term-limited. New governor elected. Democratic gain.	✓ Robert B. Meyner (Democratic) 53.17%; Paul L. Troast (Republican) 44.68%; Clendenin Ryan (Independent Voters) 1.29%; Henry B. Krajewski (Veterans Bonus Now) 0.71%; Albert Ronis (Socialist Labor) 0.16%
Virginia	John S. Battle	Democratic	1949	Incumbent term-limited. New governor elected. Democratic hold.	✓ Thomas B. Stanley (Democratic) 54.83%; Theodore Roosevelt Dalton (Republican) 44.28%; Howard Carwile (Independent) 0.89%
