= 1957 United States gubernatorial elections =

- November 5, 1957

2 governorships
	Majority party	Minority party
Party	Democratic	Republican
Seats before	29	19
Seats after	29	19
Seat change	Steady	Steady
Seats up	2	0
Seats won	2	0
- Democratic hold

United States gubernatorial elections were held on November 5, 1957, in two states, New Jersey and Virginia. The elections did not result in a change of balance between Democratic and Republican seats

== Results ==
State	Incumbent	Party	Status	Opposing candidates
New Jersey	Robert B. Meyner	Democratic	Re-elected, 54.55%	Malcolm Forbes (Republican) 44.46% Albert Ronis (Socialist Labor) 0.31% Henry B. Krajewski (American Third) 0.31% Winifred O. Perry (Conservative) 0.30% Anthony D. Scipio (American) 0.08%
Virginia	Thomas B. Stanley	Democratic	Term-limited, Democratic victory	J. Lindsay Almond (Democratic) 63.16% Theodore Roosevelt Dalton (Republican) 36.44% C. Gilmer Brooks (Independent) 0.40%
