= 1961 New Jersey gubernatorial election =

- November 7, 1961
- Turnout: 73.3% of eligible voters (▼0.7 pp)
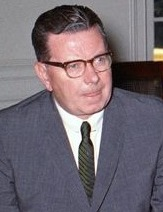

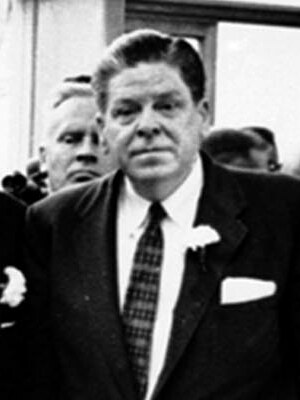
| Nominee | Richard J. Hughes | James P. Mitchell |
| Party | Democratic | Republican |
| Popular vote | 1,084,194 | 1,049,274 |
| Percentage | 50.37% | 48.74% |
- County results Hughes: 50–60% 60–70% Mitchell: 50–60% 60–70%
Governor before election
Robert B. Meyner
Democratic
Elected Governor
Richard J. Hughes
Democratic

The 1961 New Jersey gubernatorial election was held on November 7, 1961. Democratic incumbent Robert B. Meyner was term-limited and in-eligible to run for re-election. Democratic nominee Richard J. Hughes defeated Republican nominee James P. Mitchell with 50 percent of the vote. This was the last election until 2025 where the term-limited governor was succeeded by a member of their own party via election.

Primary elections were held on April 18, 1961. Richard J. Hughes won the Democratic nomination with nominal opposition after consolidating party organization support in February. In the Republican primary, U.S. labor secretary James P. Mitchell won the nomination over state senators Walter H. Jones and Wayne Dumont in a demonstration of the strength of U.S. senator Clifford P. Case over the party.

== Democratic primary ==
=== Candidates ===
- Eugene E. Demarest, former mayor of Hackensack (1960–61)
- Richard J. Hughes, attorney and former Mercer County Superior Court judge (1952–57)
- Weldon R. Sheets, Essex County Supervisor

==== Withdrew ====
- John J. Grogan, mayor of Hoboken and candidate for U.S. Senate in 1958 (withdrew February 13, 1961)
- Michael Kearney, Fort Lee tax attorney

==== Declined ====
- Donal C. Fox, state senator for Essex County
- William F. Hyland, Public Utilities Commissioner and former assemblyman from Camden
- Grover C. Richman Jr., former New Jersey attorney general and U.S. Attorney for the District of New Jersey
- Frank Thompson, U.S. representative from Trenton
- Harrison A. Williams, U.S. senator since 1959

=== Campaign ===
Beginning in December 1960, outgoing governor Robert B. Meyner struggled to settle on a consensus candidate with local and county party leaders for the nomination. Meyner favored U.S. senator Harrison A. Williams or William F. Hyland as his successor. Williams declined, and party leaders failed to reach an agreement for over two months.

In February, former Superior Court judge Richard J. Hughes emerged as a dark horse candidate for the nomination. Hughes, a self-avowed liberal and supporter of President John F. Kennedy, had been elected to the Democratic state committee in 1937 and ran a failed campaign for the U.S. House of Representatives in 1938. His campaign was led by Mercer County chair Thorn Lord, who was also Hughes's law partner, along with national committeeman David T. Wilentz and Hudson County party chair John V. Kenny. After Frank Thompson declined for a second time, party leaders quickly consolidated around Hughes. He received the backing of leadership in Burlington, Essex, Hudson, Middlesex, Mercer, Passaic and Union counties, making him the front-runner for organization support in the primary. George Cable of The New York Times remarked that Hughes's ascent was "a clear victory for other top party leaders" over Meyner and was expected to lead John J. Grogan to withdraw and the Essex County party to withdraw its endorsement of Donal C. Fox.

On February 13, Hughes was officially designated as the party organization's candidate for governor with the support of 20 out of 21 county chairs. Grogan withdrew the same day. The designation was considered tantamount to nomination, as it ensured Hughes would have no serious opposition for the nomination at the April 18 primary election.

=== Results ===
Democratic primary results
| Party | Candidate | Votes | % |
|---|---|---|---|
| Democratic | Richard J. Hughes | 222,789 | 84.21 |
| Democratic | Weldon R. Sheets | 21,285 | 8.05 |
| Democratic | Eugene E. Demarest | 20,487 | 7.74 |
| Total votes | | 264,561 | 100.00 |

== Republican primary ==
=== Candidates ===
- Louis Berns, Oradell resident
- Wayne Dumont, state senator for Warren County
- Walter H. Jones, state senator for Bergen County
- James P. Mitchell, former United States Secretary of Labor

==== Withdrew ====
- Charles W. Sandman Jr., state senator for Cape May County (withdrew February 8, 1961; endorsed Jones)

==== Declined ====
- William T. Cahill, U.S. representative from Collingswood (endorsed Mitchell)
- Robert C. Crane, state senator for Union County
- Florence Dwyer, U.S. representative from Elizabeth (endorsed Mitchell)
- Peter Frelinghuysen, U.S. representative from Morristown (endorsed Mitchell)
- Richard R. Stout, state senator for Monmouth County

Senator Wayne Dumont was the first candidate to announce his campaign in late November 1960, following the presidential election. Walter H. Jones and Charles W. Sandman soon announced their campaigns.

=== Campaign ===
In late 1960, Bergen County state senator Walter H. Jones was the early favorite for the nomination over senators Wayne Dumont and Charles W. Sandman, having secured the endorsements of the party organization in Bergen, Hudson, Middlesex, Passaic, and Somerset counties, which combined for almost half of the vote in typical Republican primaries. Essex County, which was reportedly leaning strongly toward Jones, accounted for another 20 to 30 percent. However, in a January 6, 1961 speech at Princeton, U.S. senator Clifford Case declared his intent to take leadership of the party, setting off a power struggle between Republican members of Congress, led by Case, and state politicians.

Despite Jones's early lead, Secretary of Labor James P. Mitchell joined the race on January 14 with support and urging from Case, President Dwight D. Eisenhower, and the Republican members of the New Jersey delegation to the United States House of Representatives. At his final cabinet meeting as president, Eisenhower produced a $100 bill and handed it to Mitchell as a symbolic campaign contribution. Mitchell's entry reshaped the race as a contest between Republican leaders in state and local government and those in Washington.

On January 16, Republican state senators met in Trenton to rebuke Mitchell's candidacy; eight of the eleven Republican senators, led by Richard R. Stout, signed a statement arguing that Mitchell "has not been active and is not familiar in the affairs of the state and has not had experience in state government and the problems facing the state." Only Thomas J. Hillery and Wesley Lance refused to sign the statement; Robert C. Crane, who was undergoing treatment for fatal cancer, was absent.

On February 8, Sandman withdrew from the race and endorsed Jones. All eight South Jersey county chairs switched their endorsement from Sandman to Jones, giving Jones organization support throughout the state. Dumont, however, said that he would "not withdraw under any circumstances."

=== Endorsements ===
Wayne Dumont

Local officials

- F. Edward Biertuempfel, mayor of Union Township
Walter H. Jones

State legislators

- Robert C. Crane, state senator for Union County
- Charles W. Sandman, state senator for Cape May

Political parties

- Atlantic County Republican Committee
- Bergen County Republican Committee
- Burlington County Republican Committee
- Camden County Republican Committee
- Cape May County Republican Committee
- Cumberland County Republican Committee
- Hudson County Republican Committee
- Gloucester County Republican Committee
- Middlesex County Republican Committee
- Ocean County Republican Committee
- Passaic County Republican Committee
- Salem County Republican Committee
- Somerset County Republican Committee
James P. Mitchell

Federal executive branch officials

- Dwight D. Eisenhower, 34th president of the United States

U.S. senators

- Clifford P. Case, U.S. senator from New Jersey since 1955

U.S. representatives

- James C. Auchincloss, U.S. representative from Rumson
- William T. Cahill, U.S. representative from Collingswood
- Florence Dwyer, U.S. representative from Elizabeth
- Peter Frelinghuysen, U.S. representative from Morristown

Political parties

- Union County Republican Committee
Charles W. Sandman (withdrew)

Political parties

- ~~Atlantic County Republican Committee~~ (switched endorsement to Jones)
- ~~Burlington County Republican Committee~~ (switched endorsement to Jones)
- ~~Camden County Republican Committee~~ (switched endorsement to Jones)
- ~~Cape May County Republican Committee~~ (switched endorsement to Jones)
- ~~Cumberland County Republican Committee~~ (switched endorsement to Jones)
- ~~Gloucester County Republican Committee~~ (switched endorsement to Jones)
- ~~Ocean County Republican Committee~~ (switched endorsement to Jones)
- ~~Salem County Republican Committee~~ (switched endorsement to Jones)
Richard R. Stout (declined)

Political parties

- Monmouth County Republican Committee

=== Results ===
Republican Party primary results
| Party | Candidate | Votes | % |
|---|---|---|---|
| Republican | James P. Mitchell | 202,188 | 43.68 |
| Republican | Walter H. Jones | 160,553 | 34.69 |
| Republican | Wayne Dumont | 95,761 | 20.69 |
| Republican | Louis Berns | 4,376 | 0.95 |
| Total votes | | 462,878 | 100.00 |

== General election ==
=== Candidates ===
- G. George Addonizio, member of the Belleville Township Council (Independent)
- Richard J. Hughes, former Mercer County Superior Court judge (Democratic)
- Henry B. Krajewski, perennial candidate (Veterans Bonus Now)
- Edward J. Lueddeke (Prosperity with Liberty)
- Reinhardt V. Metzger, former Assemblyman from Essex County (Conservative)
- James P. Mitchell, former United States Secretary of Labor (Republican)
- Daniel Petrino (State Soldiers Bonus)
- Albert Ronis (Socialist Labor)
- Ruth F. Shiminsky (Socialist Workers)

==== Withdrew ====
- John J. Witzkowski, counsel to the Jersey City Board of Education and brother of Jersey City mayor Charles S. Witkowski (Independent)

=== Results ===
New Jersey gubernatorial election, 1961
| Party | Candidate | Votes | % | ±% |
|---|---|---|---|---|
| Democratic | Richard J. Hughes | 1,084,194 | 50.37% | ▼4.18 |
| Republican | James P. Mitchell | 1,049,274 | 48.74% | ▲4.28 |
| Conservative | Reinhardt V. Metzger | 5,820 | 0.27% | ▼0.03 |
| Independent | Henry B. Krajewski | 3,904 | 0.18% | ▼0.13 |
| Independent | Edward J. Lueddeke | 2,541 | 0.12% | N/A |
| Independent | G. George Addonizio | 2,462 | 0.11% | N/A |
| Socialist Labor | Albert Ronis | 2,103 | 0.10% | ▼0.21 |
| Independent | Daniel Petrino | 1,393 | 0.07% | N/A |
| Socialist Workers | Ruth F. Shiminsky | 971 | 0.05% | N/A |
| Majority | | | | |
| Turnout | | | | |
| Democratic hold | | Swing | | |

==== By county ====
| County | Richard J. Hughes Democratic | | James P. Mitchell Republican | | Various candidates Other parties | | Margin | | Total votes cast |
| County | # | % | # | % | # | % | # | % | Total votes cast |
|---|---|---|---|---|---|---|---|---|---|
| Atlantic | 27,254 | 42.9% | 34,766 | 54.7% | 1,510 | 2.4% | -7,512 | -11.8% | 63,530 |
| Bergen | 123,421 | 41.4% | 171,180 | 57.5% | 3,236 | 1.4% | -47,759 | -16.1% | 297,837 |
| Burlington | 30,756 | 52.6% | 27,331 | 46.8% | 359 | 0.6% | 3,425 | 5.8% | 58,446 |
| Camden | 74,030 | 54.9% | 59,984 | 44.5% | 768 | 0.6% | 14,046 | 10.4% | 134,782 |
| Cape May | 8,725 | 43.9% | 11,008 | 55.4% | 133 | 0.6% | -2,283 | -11.5% | 19,866 |
| Cumberland | 19,266 | 54.7% | 15,769 | 44.8% | 169 | 0.5% | 3,497 | 9.9% | 35,204 |
| Essex | 156,033 | 53.1% | 135,342 | 46.1% | 2,418 | 0.8% | 20,691 | 7.0% | 293,793 |
| Gloucester | 25,289 | 51.0% | 24,183 | 48.8% | 109 | 0.2% | 1,106 | 1.2% | 49,581 |
| Hudson | 136,145 | 57.9% | 95,886 | 40.8% | 2,937 | 1.2% | 40,259 | 17.1% | 234,968 |
| Hunterdon | 8,725 | 42.7% | 11,555 | 56.5% | 168 | 0.8% | -2,830 | -13.8% | 20,448 |
| Mercer | 61,550 | 61.9% | 37,444 | 37.6% | 473 | 0.5% | 24,106 | 24.3% | 99,467 |
| Middlesex | 98,359 | 59.5% | 65,577 | 39.7% | 1,262 | 0.7% | 32,782 | 19.8% | 165,198 |
| Monmouth | 49,227 | 43.8% | 61,513 | 54.8% | 1,584 | 1.5% | -12,286 | -11.0% | 112,324 |
| Morris | 29,216 | 34.7% | 54,564 | 64.7% | 531 | 0.6% | -25,348 | -30.0% | 84,311 |
| Ocean | 18,154 | 41.9% | 24,753 | 57.1% | 416 | 1.0% | -6,599 | -15.2% | 43,323 |
| Passaic | 72,175 | 53.6% | 61,176 | 45.5% | 1,221 | 0.9% | 10,999 | 8.1% | 134,572 |
| Salem | 12,237 | 56.2% | 9,532 | 43.8% | 11 | 0.01% | 2,705 | 12.4% | 21,780 |
| Somerset | 22,784 | 43.9% | 28,596 | 55.1% | 477 | 0.9% | -5,812 | -11.2% | 51,857 |
| Sussex | 7,674 | 39.7% | 11,611 | 60.1% | 44 | 0.3% | -3,937 | -20.4% | 19,329 |
| Union | 90,912 | 48.0% | 97,205 | 51.3% | 1,313 | 0.7% | -6,293 | -3.3% | 189,430 |
| Warren | 12,262 | 54.2% | 10,299 | 45.5% | 55 | 0.2% | 1,963 | 8.7% | 22,616 |
| Totals | 1,084,194 | 50.37% | 1,049,274 | 48.74% | 19,194 | 0.91% | 34,920 | 1.63% | 2,207,931 |

Counties that flipped from Democratic to Republican

- Monmouth
- Somerset
- Union
