= William E. Ozzard =

American politician (1915-2002)

William Ozzard

95th President of the New Jersey Senate
- In office 1963–1963
- Preceded by: Frank Farley
- Succeeded by: Charles W. Sandman

Member of the New Jersey Senate from the 8th district
- In office 1957–1973
- Preceded by: district created
- Succeeded by: Raymond Bateman

Member of the New Jersey General Assembly from the Somerset County district
- In office 1953–1957
- Succeeded by: Raymond Bateman

Personal details
- Born: William Edward Ozzard; June 15, 1915 Weehawken, New Jersey, U.S.
- Died: June 22, 2002 (aged 87)
- Political party: Republican

William E. Ozzard (June 15, 1915 — June 29, 2002) was an American Republican Party politician who served for 13 years in the New Jersey Legislature, serving as New Jersey Senate President in 1963. He was President of the New Jersey Board of Public Utilities from 1970 to 1973.

== Biography ==
Ozzard was born in 1915 in Weehawken, New Jersey. He grew up in Bound Brook, New Jersey, and attended Bound Brook High School, graduating in 1931. He graduated from Rutgers University and New York University Law School. He was admitted to the New Jersey bar and joined the Somerville law firm of Beekman & Beekman, where he later became a partner.

In World War II, Ozzard served as a first lieutenant in the United States Army. He received the Army Commendation Ribbon, the European Campaign Medal, the World War II Victory Medal, the Army of Occupation Medal and two battle stars.

Ozzard was elected to the New Jersey General Assembly from Somerset County in 1953. In 1957, he succeeded Malcolm Forbes in the New Jersey Senate when Forbes ran for Governor of New Jersey. He served as Senate President in 1963 and was Acting Governor in the absence of Governor Richard J. Hughes. He left the Senate in 1967 and was appointed by Governor Hughes as a Commissioner of the New Jersey Board of Public Utilities.

In 1969, Ozzard unsuccessfully sought the Republican nomination for Governor of New Jersey. He lost the Republican primary to William T. Cahill, also finishing behind U.S. Rep. Charles W. Sandman, Jr., State Sen. Harry L. Sears, and State Sen. Frank X. McDermott. Cahill went on to win the general election and in 1970 appointed Ozzard to be president of the Board of Public Utility Commissioners. He served until 1973.

Ozzard was admitted to the Florida bar in 1975. He died on June 29, 2002, at the age of 87. He was buried in Somerset Hills Memorial Park.

He was included in the first nominating class of the Bound Brook High School Alumni Hall of Fame upon its creation in 2003.

Political offices
Preceded by Frank S. Farley	President of the New Jersey Senate; 1963	Succeeded by Charles W. Sandman
