= B. C. Forbes =

Scottish-American financial journalist (1880–1954)

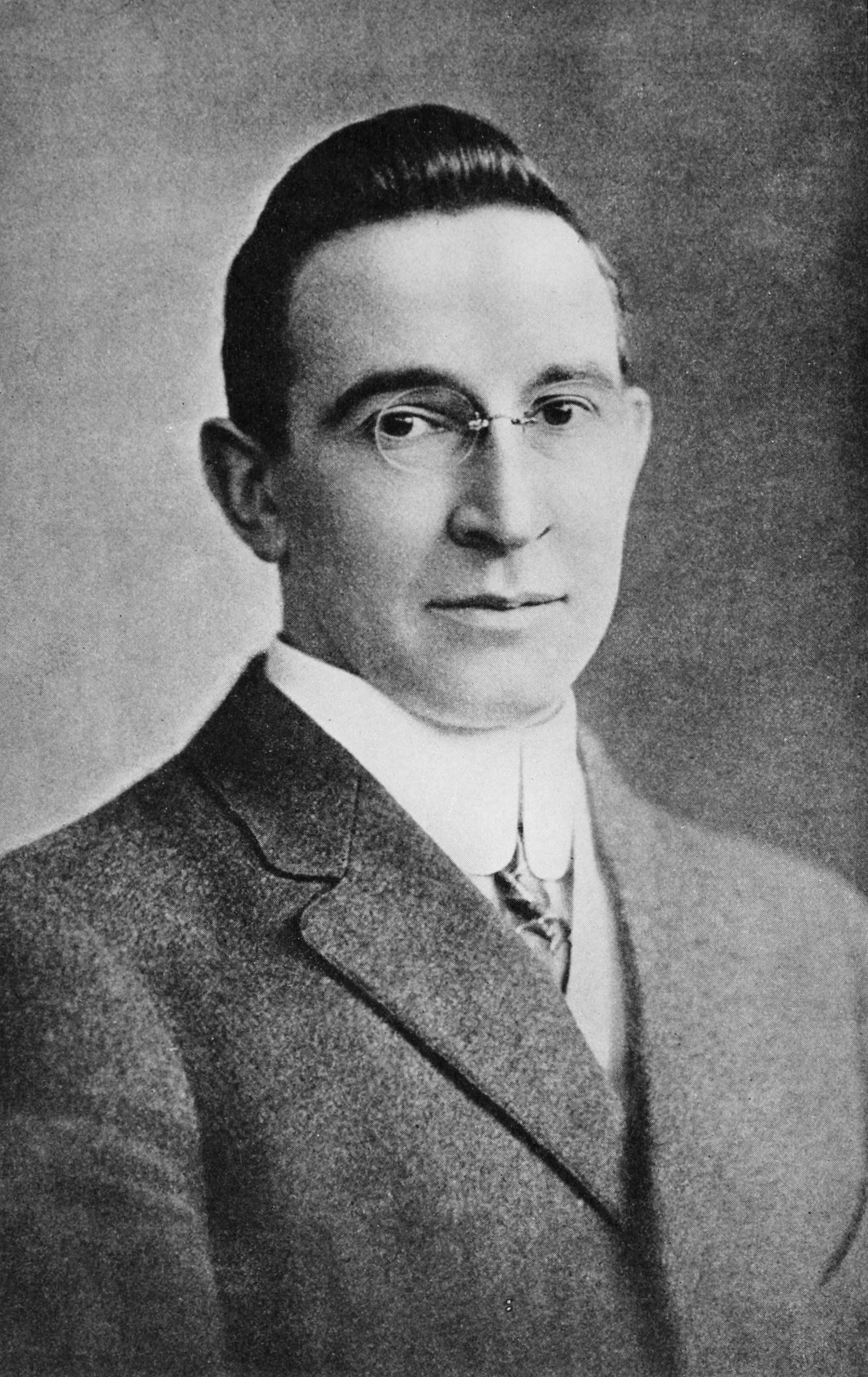
- Forbes c. 1917
- Born: Bertie Charles Forbes; May 14, 1880; New Deer, Aberdeenshire, Scotland
- Died: May 6, 1954 (aged 73); New York City, U.S.
- Education: University of St Andrews
- Occupations: Journalist; author; publisher
- Spouse: Adelaide Mary Stevenson
- Children: Malcolm Forbes
- Family: Forbes family

Signature
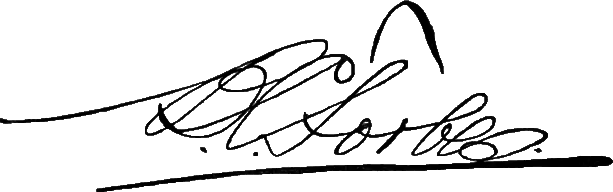

Bertie Charles Forbes (/fɔːrbz/; May 14, 1880 – May 6, 1954) was a Scottish-American financial journalist and author who founded Forbes magazine.

== Early life and education ==
Forbes was born in New Deer, Aberdeenshire, Scotland, the son of Agnes (Moir) and Robert Forbes, a storekeeper and tailor at Whitehill, one of their ten children. Forbes attended University College, Dundee, which was then part of the University of St Andrews.

== Career ==
In 1897, Forbes worked as a reporter and editorial writer with a local newspaper. In 1901, he moved to Johannesburg, South Africa, where he worked on the Rand Daily Mail under its first editor, Edgar Wallace.

In 1904, he immigrated to New York City where he was employed as a writer and financial editor at the Journal of Commerce before joining the Hearst chain of newspapers as a syndicated columnist in 1911. After two years, he became the business and financial editor at Hearst's New York American, where he remained until 1916.

He founded Forbes magazine in 1917 and remained the magazine's editor-in-chief until his death in New York City in 1954, though he was assisted in his later years by his two eldest sons, Bruce Charles Forbes and Malcolm Stevenson Forbes.

Forbes was the founder of the Investors League in 1942.

== Family ==
The Forbes family includes a number of related people that founded, and have worked for, Forbes magazine. The family has close ties to Princeton University, with their namesake Forbes College as one of Princeton's residential colleges. Noted members include:

- Bertie Charles Forbes, a.k.a. B.C. Forbes (1880–1954), the founder of the magazine
  - Bruce Charles Forbes (1916–1964), eldest son of B.C. Forbes
  - Malcolm Stevenson Forbes (1919–1990), son and successor of B.C. Forbes
    - Steve Forbes a.k.a. Malcolm Forbes Jr. (b. 1947), son of Malcolm Forbes, current editor-in-chief and former chairman, president, and CEO of the company
      - Moira Forbes (b. 1979), daughter of Steve Forbes
    - Christopher Forbes (b. 1950), son of Malcolm Forbes, former Vice Chairman and a Vice Chancellor of the American Association of the Sovereign Military Order of Malta
    - Robert Laidlaw Forbes, son of Malcolm Forbes
    - Tim Forbes, son of Malcolm Forbes and former president and chief operating officer
    - Moira Hamilton, daughter of Malcolm Forbes

== Death ==
He died on May 6, 1954. In 1988, his body was returned to his native Scotland, and lies buried in the New Deer Churchyard at Hill of Culsh in New Deer, Aberdeenshire. While living abroad, he returned to Buchan every two years, staying in the Cruden Bay Hotel, "to entertain people of Whitehill to a picnic". It was a tradition revived by his son, Malcolm, in 1987.

== Published works ==
Forbes authored nine books:

- Finance, Business and the Business of Life (1915)
- Men Who Are Making America (1917)
- Keys to Success or Personal Efficiency (1918)
- Forbes Epigrams (1922)
- Men Who are Making the West (1923)
- Automotive Giants of America (1925)
- How to Get the Most Out of Business (1927)
- 101 Unusual Experiences (1952)
- America's Twelve Master Salesmen (1952)

== Bibliography ==
- McKean, Charles (1990), Banff & Buchan, Royal Incorporation of Architects in Scotland, ISBN 978-1-85158-231-0
