= Paul L. Troast =

American politician

Paul Troast
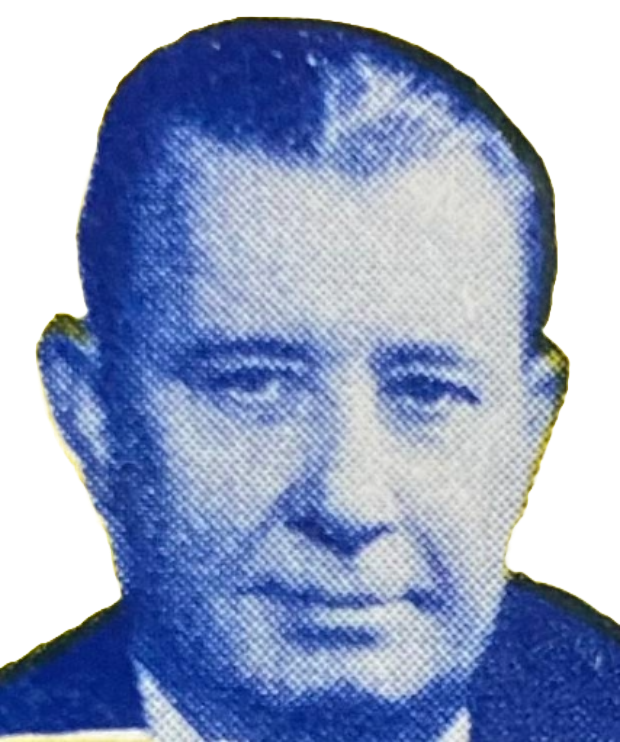
- Born: Paul Lyman Troast; November 19, 1894; Garfield, New Jersey, U.S.
- Died: July 21, 1972 (aged 77); Clifton, New Jersey, U.S.
- Occupation: Businessman
- Political party: Republican
- Spouse: Eleanor Mahony
- Children: 4

Paul Lyman Troast (November 19, 1894 – July 21, 1972) was an American building contractor from Passaic, New Jersey, and chairman of the New Jersey Turnpike Authority during its construction. He was the unsuccessful Republican candidate for Governor of New Jersey in 1953.

== Background ==
Born on November 19, 1894, in Garfield, New Jersey, Troast grew up in Passaic, New Jersey, and graduated from Passaic High School in 1908, where he met his future wife, the former Eleanor Mahony; he had been president of his senior class and she had been vice president.

== Career ==
=== New Jersey Turnpike ===
In January 1949, Governor of New Jersey Alfred E. Driscoll nominated Troast as the first of the three commissioners for the newly formed Turnpike Authority.

In an August 1949 press release as chairman of the Turnpike Authority, Troast emphasized that the construction of the turnpike within two years would provide a superhighway that would alleviate congestion on existing roadways in the heavily industrialized northeastern portion of the state. Emphasizing the need for speed in completing the project within his self-imposed two-year deadline, Troast posted a sign on his office door that read "The Turnpike Must Be Done By Nov. '51".

According to a letter to the editor written by his daughter, Kathleen Troast Pitney: "Governor Driscoll appointed three men to the Turnpike Authority in the late 1940s -- Maxwell Lester, George Smith and Paul Troast, my father, as chairman. They had no enabling legislation and no funding. They were able to open more than two-thirds of the road in 11 months, completing the whole (project) in less than two years. . . . When the commissioners broached the subject of landscaping the road. . . . the governor told them he wanted a road to take the interstate traffic . . . off New Jersey's existing roads. Since 85 percent of the traffic at that time was estimated to be from out of state, why spend additional funds on landscaping?"

=== Run for New Jersey Governor ===
In 1953, Troast won the Republican nomination for Governor of New Jersey and faced Robert B. Meyner, a little-known one-term former member of the New Jersey Senate who had been chosen by a Democratic Party that was largely dysfunctional and hadn't been successful in getting a candidate elected to statewide office since 1940. Time wrote "county bosses ... pushed him through a bitter, party-splitting primary last April. Troast, with no political experience, was known principally for his chairmanship of the commission that built the $220 million New Jersey Turnpike. But his campaigning has been as flat as his turnpike. He was overconfident, started too late, and let the Democrats gobble up most of the best radio and television time.... Troast suffered his roundest wallop early in October, when newspapers broke the story that Troast had asked New York's Tom Dewey to commute the sentence of Labor Extortionist Joey Fay." Seven major candidates had run in the primary, with Troast beating second place candidate Malcolm Forbes by 47,000 votes.

Initially favored, he lost to Meyner by 154,000 votes in the November 1953 gubernatorial election, with Meyner winning what The New York Times described as a "surprising landslide plurality" in what had been expected as a tight race that Meyner was expected to win by a far narrower margin. Meyner received 962,710 votes (53.2%), ahead of Troast with 809,068 (44.7%) and 39,034 ballots cast for third-party candidates.

=== Later career ===
Troast made news again five years later, when, as Time reported: "Rush H. Kress, 81, ailing brother of the late founder of the 261-store S. H. Kress & Co. five-and-ten chain, was replaced as chairman by New Jersey Construction Executive Paul L. Troast, a leader in the revolt of Kress Foundation directors that stripped Rush Kress of power. Command of the slipping company (sales slid from $176 million in 1952 to $159 million last year) will be shared by Troast, recently named President George L. Cobb and Executive Committee Chairman Frank M. Folsom" Troast was a trustee of Kress from 1951 to 1972.

Troast served as chairman of the board of the New Jersey Business and Industry Association (NJBIA) and its affiliate, the New Jersey Manufacturers Insurance Co., from 1963 until his death in 1972. According to the NJBIA, "he made so many contributions to New Jersey and its business community that Governor Richard J. Hughes called him 'Mr. New Jersey'." The NJBIA presents the Troast Award annually "to a public servant who has made an outstanding contribution to the State of New Jersey and its business community."

== Death ==
In 1972, Troast died at his home in Clifton, New Jersey, at the age of 77. He was survived by his children Paul Troast Jr., Kathleen Troast Pitney, Arthur Troast, John Troast and 19 grandchildren.

Party political offices
Preceded by Alfred E. Driscoll	Republican Nominee for Governor of New Jersey; 1953	Succeeded by Malcolm Forbes
