= 1965 New Jersey gubernatorial election =

- November 2, 1965
- Turnout: 72.7% of eligible voters (▼0.6 pp)
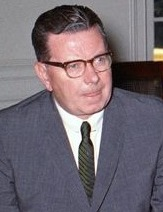

Nominee	Richard J. Hughes	Wayne Dumont
Party	Democratic	Republican
Popular vote	1,279,568	915,996
Percentage	57.39%	41.08%
- County results Hughes: 50–60% 60–70% 70–80% Dumont: 50–60%
Governor before election
Richard J. Hughes
Democratic
Elected Governor
Richard J. Hughes
Democratic

The 1965 New Jersey gubernatorial election was held on November 2, 1965. Democratic incumbent Richard J. Hughes defeated Republican nominee Wayne Dumont with 57 percent of the vote. Until 2025, the gubernatorial elections from 1953 to 1965 were the last in New Jersey in which any party won more than two consecutive elections. This is the most recent time a Democrat was reelected Governor with a higher share of the vote than the previous election.

Primary elections were held on June 1, 1965. Hughes was easily re-nominated over token opposition from William H. Clark, while Dumont won a narrow primary over fellow state senator Charles W. Sandman Jr. of Cape May County.

Bergen County voted Democratic for the first time since 1931, and since this election, the county has become a bellwether having voted for the winning candidate all but once since. Democrats simultaneously flipped both houses of the New Jersey legislature, a first since 1915.

== Democratic primary ==
=== Candidates ===
- William H. Clark, Newark Marxist activist and member of the Negro-Labor Vanguard
- Richard J. Hughes, incumbent governor since 1962

=== Results ===
Democratic primary results
Party	Candidate	Votes	%
Democratic	Richard J. Hughes (incumbent)	236,518	90.89%
Democratic	William J. Clark	23,722	9.12%
Total votes		260,240	100.00%

== Republican primary ==
=== Candidates ===
- Wayne Dumont, state senator from Warren County
- Charles W. Sandman, Jr., state senator from Cape May County
- Harold P. Poeschel, Short Hills life insurance agent and perennial Conservative Party candidate

==== Declined ====
- Nelson Stamler, state senator from Union County (endorsed Sandman)

=== Campaign ===
Senator Nelson Stamler informally sought party support for a potential campaign, citing his opposition to court-mandated legislative redistricting and Dumont's proposal for a sales tax. After failing to gain sufficient endorsements, Stamler declined to run and instead endorsed Sandman.

=== Results ===
Republican Party primary results
Party	Candidate	Votes	%
Republican	Wayne Dumont	167,402	50.35%
Republican	Charles W. Sandman Jr.	154,491	46.47%
Republican	Harold P. Poeschel	10,576	3.18%
Total votes		332,469	100.00%

== General election ==
=== Candidates ===
- Wayne Dumont, state senator from Warren County (Republican)
- Richard J. Hughes, incumbent governor since 1962 (Democratic)
- Julius Levin, apartment manager (Socialist Labor)
- Robert Lee Schlachter (Conservative)
- Ruth F. Shiminsky (Socialist Workers)
- Christopher C. Vespucci (Veterans Choice)

=== Results ===
New Jersey gubernatorial election, 1965
Party	Candidate	Votes	%	±%
Democratic	Richard J. Hughes (incumbent)	1,279,568	57.39%	▲7.02
Republican	Wayne Dumont	915,996	41.08%	▼7.66
Conservative	Robert Lee Schlachter	20,753	0.93%	▲0.73
Independent	Christopher C. Vespucci	5,378	0.24%	N/A
Socialist Labor	Julius Levin	4,669	0.21%	▲0.11
Socialist Workers	Ruth F. Shiminsky	3,219	0.14%	▲0.09
Majority				
Turnout				
Democratic hold		Swing		

==== Results by county ====
County	Hughes votes	Hughes %	Dumont votes	Dumont %	Other votes	Other %
Atlantic	35,245	52.1%	30,455	45.0%	1,999	3.0%
Bergen	179,197	55.9%	138,097	43.1%	2,997	0.9%
Burlington	35,468	53.0%	30,666	45.8%	843	1.3%
Camden	73,926	56.5%	53,241	40.7%	3,728	2.9%
Cape May	11,127	50.8%	10,449	47.7%	335	1.6%
Cumberland	19,501	55.0%	15,800	44.6%	159	0.4%
Essex	178,830	60.9%	109,081	37.1%	5,830	2.0%
Gloucester	26,411	51.6%	24,487	47.8%	328	0.7%
Hudson	156,671	72.3%	55,632	25.7%	4,513	2.1%
Hunterdon	8,996	43.0%	11,726	56.1%	189	0.9%
Mercer	62,835	65.0%	33,206	34.3%	634	0.7%
Middlesex	114,548	64.7%	61,063	34.5%	1,479	0.8%
Monmouth	64,525	51.7%	58,959	47.2%	1,365	1.1%
Morris	46,174	45.2%	54,306	53.1%	1,709	1.7%
Ocean	23,982	44.5%	28,879	53.6%	1,041	1.9%
Passaic	78,193	57.2%	55,998	40.9%	2,581	1.9%
Salem	11,629	53.5%	10,054	46.2%	62	0.3%
Somerset	29,659	50.7%	27,207	46.5%	1,588	2.8%
Sussex	9,162	41.1%	13,002	58.3%	135	0.5%
Union	103,067	56.0%	78,820	42.8%	2,277	1.3%
Warren	10,422	40.8%	14,868	58.3%	227	0.8%

==== Counties that flipped from Republican to Democratic ====
- Atlantic
- Bergen
- Cape May
- Monmouth
- Union
- Somerset

==== Counties that flipped from Democratic to Republican ====
- Warren
