= 1953 New Jersey gubernatorial election =

- November 3, 1953
- Turnout: 70% of eligible voters (▼6%)
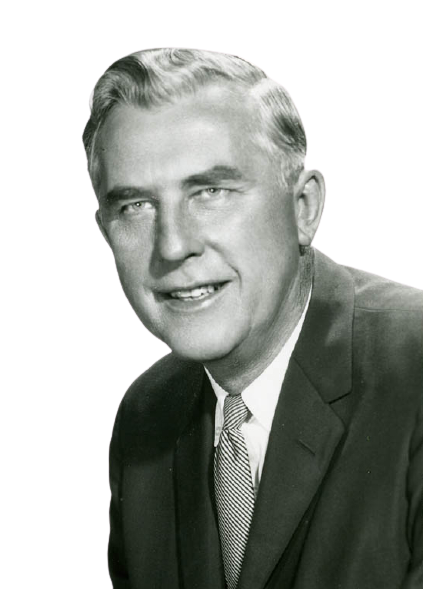

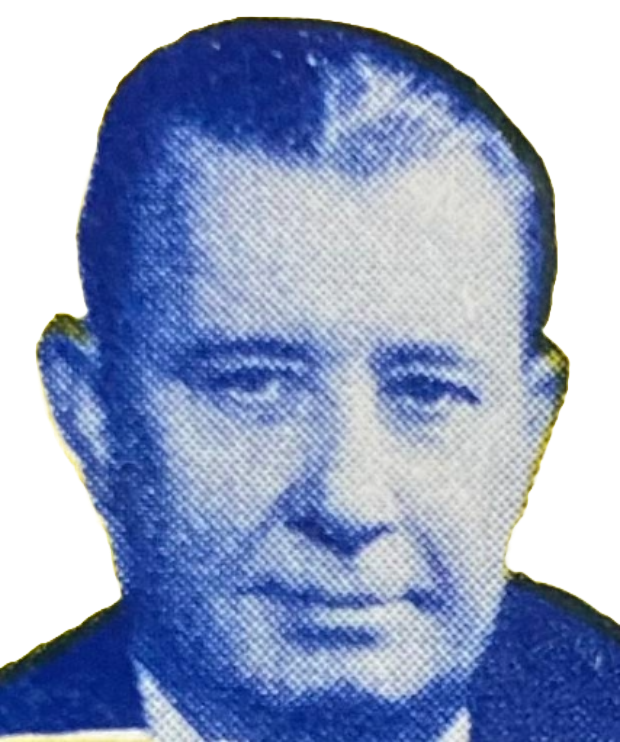
| Nominee | Robert B. Meyner | Paul L. Troast |
| Party | Democratic | Republican |
| Popular vote | 962,710 | 809,068 |
| Percentage | 53.17% | 44.68% |
- County results Meyner: 50–60% 60–70% Troast: 50–60% 60–70%
Governor before election
Alfred E. Driscoll
Republican
Elected Governor
Robert B. Meyner
Democratic

The 1953 New Jersey gubernatorial election was held on November 3, 1953. Incumbent governor Alfred E. Driscoll was constitutionally prohibited from seeking a third term in office. Democratic former State Senator Robert B. Meyner defeated Republican businessman Paul L. Troast winning 53.17% of the vote.

Primary elections were held on April 21, 1953.

== Republican primary ==
=== Candidates ===
- Malcolm Forbes, state senator from Somerset County
- Kenneth Hand, state senator from Union County
- Charles Richard Klein, senior guard at Rahway State Prison
- Frederick F. Richardson, former mayor of New Brunswick
- Fred E. Shepard, state assemblyman from Elizabeth
- Paul L. Troast, businessman and chairman of the New Jersey Turnpike Authority
- Alvin W. Van Schoick, Long Branch golf caddy

==== Withdrew ====
- Clifford Case, U.S. representative from Rahway

=== Campaign ===
The campaign was primarily a contest between businessman Paul Troast and state senator and billionaire magazine publisher Malcolm Forbes. Troast campaigned on a platform of spending cuts and was considered the favorite by the final weeks of the campaign. He had the support of the Driscoll administration and virtually every major Republican leader, including 18 out of 21 county organizations, while Forbes ran as an outsider anti-administration candidate.

=== Results ===
Troast won handily. Forbes carried his home county of Somerset and native Passaic by large margins, but trailed nearly everywhere else.

Republican Party primary results
| Party | Candidate | Votes | % |
|---|---|---|---|
| Republican | Paul L. Troast | 218,826 | 51.59% |
| Republican | Malcolm Forbes | 166,364 | 39.22% |
| Republican | Kenneth C. Hand | 15,373 | 3.62% |
| Republican | Alvin W. Van Schoick | 7,504 | 1.77% |
| Republican | Frederick F. Richardson | 6,255 | 1.48% |
| Republican | Fred E. Shepard | 6,229 | 1.47% |
| Republican | Charles Richard Klein | 3,627 | 0.86% |
| Total votes | | 424,178 | 100.0% |

== Democratic primary ==
=== Candidates ===
- Robert B. Meyner, attorney and former state senator from Warren County
- Alexander F. Ormsby, Jersey City attorney and former judge of the Court of Common Pleas
- Elmer H. Wene, chicken breeder, former U.S. Representative from Cumberland County, and nominee for Governor in 1949
- John J. Winberry, Passaic attorney and former special assistant New Jersey Attorney General

=== Campaign ===
The primary campaign was a tight contest between the previous nominee, former Congressman Elmer H. Wene and former State Senator Robert B. Meyner. It was the first competitive Democratic primary for governor in at least 25 years. Meyner had the support of the state party establishment and a base in North Jersey, while Wene enjoyed an edge among rank-and-file voters and higher name recognition owing to his 1949 campaign.

The Democratic campaign was insurgent, with both front-runners focusing on gambling and criminal enforcement scandals in the incumbent Republican Driscoll administration.

=== Results ===
On election night, the results were inconclusive and neither candidate claimed clear victory; Meyner led by about 6,000, owing to a large margin in Hudson County, but most of the outstanding vote was from Wene's base in rural South Jersey. After Meyner was declared the victor following a recount, Wene refused to support him, calling the Jersey City results "questionable."

Democratic primary results
| Party | Candidate | Votes | % |
|---|---|---|---|
| Democratic | Robert B. Meyner | 107,801 | 45.68% |
| Democratic | Elmer H. Wene | 106,216 | 45.01% |
| Democratic | Alexander F. Ormsby | 17,161 | 7.27% |
| Democratic | John J. Winberry | 4,828 | 2.05% |
| Total votes | | 236,006 | 100.00% |

== General election ==
=== Candidates ===
- Henry B. Krajewski, pig farmer and candidate for president in 1952 (Veterans Bonus Now)
- Robert B. Meyner, State Senator for Warren County (Democratic)
- Albert Ronis (Socialist Labor)
- Clendenin Ryan, publisher of the New American Mercury (Independent Voters)
- Paul L. Troast, businessman and chair of the New Jersey Turnpike Authority (Republican)

=== Campaign ===
The race received national attention as a test of the popularity of the new Dwight Eisenhower presidency, as the only other state election holding elections, Virginia, was safely Democratic.

Late in the campaign, Meyner suffered a setback when Democratic former mayor of Jersey Frank Hague Eggers endorsed Troast over his opposition to current mayor John V. Kenny, Meyner's chief backer. A week after that, Democratic runner-up and prior nominee Elmer H. Wene refused to support Meyner's candidacy, referring to the result in Jersey City, and therefore the primary overall, as "questionable." Though he did not endorse Troast, Wene said that "the election of a Democratic candidate would in truth be the election of Mayor Kenny and would destroy the integrity of our state government." State party chairman Charles R. Howell referred to Wene's statement as "pathetic" and accused Republicans of an alliance with former Democratic boss Frank Hague.

=== Results ===
New Jersey gubernatorial election, 1953
| Party | Candidate | Votes | % | ±% |
|---|---|---|---|---|
| Democratic | Robert B. Meyner | 962,710 | 53.17% | ▲6.04 |
| Republican | Paul L. Troast | 809,068 | 44.68% | ▼6.86 |
| Independent | Clendenin Ryan | 23,271 | 1.29% | N/A |
| Independent | Henry B. Krajewski | 12,881 | 0.71% | N/A |
| Socialist Labor | Albert Ronis | 2,882 | 0.16% | ▼0.22 |
| Majority | | | | |
| Turnout | | | | |
| Democratic hold | | Swing | | |

==== By county ====
| County | Robert B. Meyner Democratic | | Paul L. Troast Republican | | Various candidates Other parties | | Margin | | Total votes cast |
| County | # | % | # | % | # | % | # | % | Total votes cast |
|---|---|---|---|---|---|---|---|---|---|
| Atlantic | 19,481 | 35.42% | 35,452 | 64.46% | 69 | 1.12% | −15,971 | −29.04% | 55,002 |
| Bergen | 110,530 | 47.95% | 115,605 | 50.15% | 4,365 | 1.90% | −5,075 | −2.20% | 230,500 |
| Burlington | 23,236 | 53.11% | 20,403 | 46.63% | 114 | 0.26% | 2,833 | 6.48% | 43,753 |
| Camden | 68,183 | 61.52% | 41,687 | 37.62% | 952 | 0.86% | 26,496 | 23.90% | 110,822 |
| Cape May | 6,531 | 35.26% | 11,957 | 64.56% | 34 | 0.18% | -5,426 | −29.30% | 18,522 |
| Cumberland | 14,420 | 47.64% | 15,716 | 51.92% | 134 | 0.44% | −1,296 | −4.28% | 30,270 |
| Essex | 141,996 | 50.99% | 127,782 | 45.89% | 8,692 | 3.12% | 14,214 | 5.10% | 278,470 |
| Gloucester | 18,012 | 49.51% | 18,216 | 50.07% | 152 | 0.42% | −204 | −0.56% | 36,380 |
| Hudson | 160,425 | 61.48% | 89,501 | 34.30% | 11,014 | 4.22% | 70,924 | 27.18% | 260,940 |
| Hunterdon | 8,513 | 52.26% | 7,628 | 46.82% | 150 | 0.92% | 885 | 5.44% | 16,291 |
| Mercer | 50,624 | 63.41% | 28,351 | 35.51% | 856 | 1.07% | 22,273 | 27.90% | 79,831 |
| Middlesex | 72,592 | 62.33% | 40,685 | 34.93% | 3,189 | 2.74% | 31,907 | 27.40% | 116,466 |
| Monmouth | 38,615 | 47.01% | 43,046 | 52.41% | 474 | 0.58% | -4,431 | -5.40% | 82,135 |
| Morris | 26,899 | 42.11% | 36,100 | 56.51% | 884 | 1.38% | −9,201 | −14.40% | 63,883 |
| Ocean | 9,302 | 36.03% | 16,326 | 63.24% | 187 | 0.42% | -7,024 | -27.21% | 25,815 |
| Passaic | 65,852 | 50.89% | 60,599 | 46.83% | 2,945 | 2.28% | 5,253 | 4.06% | 129,396 |
| Salem | 9,919 | 56.18% | 7,694 | 43.58% | 43 | 0.24% | 2,225 | 12.60% | 17,656 |
| Somerset | 17,921 | 52.29% | 15,737 | 45.91% | 617 | 1.80% | 2,184 | 6.38% | 34,275 |
| Sussex | 6,727 | 46.53% | 7,566 | 52.33% | 165 | 1.14% | -839 | -5.80% | 14,458 |
| Union | 76,144 | 53.63% | 61,973 | 43.65% | 3,865 | 2.72% | 14,171 | 9.98% | 141,982 |
| Warren | 16,788 | 69.53% | 7,224 | 29.92% | 133 | 0.55% | 9,564 | 39.61% | 24,145 |
| Totals | 962,710 | 53.16% | 809,068 | 44.68% | 39,034 | 2.16% | 153,642 | 8.48% | 1,810,812 |

Counties that flipped from Democratic to Republican

- Atlantic
- Cumberland
- Gloucester

Counties that flipped from Republican to Democratic

- Essex
- Somerset
- Union
