= Frank X. McDermott =

American politician (1924–2011)

Francis X. McDermott (October 15, 1924 – December 15, 2011) was an American Republican Party politician who served in both houses of the New Jersey Legislature.

== Biography ==
McDermott was born in New York City in 1924. He received a Bachelor of Arts from Columbia College, a Juris Doctor from Columbia Law School, and a Master of Public Administration and Master of Laws from New York University. He was admitted to practice as an attorney in New York and New Jersey. He settled in Westfield, New Jersey, with his wife, the former Patricia Keogh.

In 1955, he served as a New Jersey delegate to the White House Conference on Education. In 1963 he was elected to the New Jersey General Assembly from Union County for the first time. He served as assistant majority leader in 1965 and minority leader in 1966.

In 1967, McDermott was elected to the New Jersey Senate. The following year he served as majority leader. In 1969 he was selected as Senate President, serving as acting governor in the absence of Governor Richard J. Hughes. Also in 1969, he was an unsuccessful candidate for the Republican nomination for Governor of New Jersey. He lost the Republican primary to William T. Cahill, also finishing behind U.S. Rep. Charles W. Sandman Jr. and State Sen. Harry L. Sears. He was Senate President pro tempore from 1970 to 1973.

In 1973, when Democrats made great gains in the Legislature with the landslide election of Brendan Byrne, McDermott was defeated in the general election for State Senate by Assemblymember Alexander J. Menza as the Democrats gained control of the state legislature for only the third time in the 20th century. In 1975 he was again elected to the General Assembly, serving one term. In 1977, he considered running in the Republican primary for governor but dropped out to become the campaign chairman for Thomas Kean. Instead of running for the Assembly, McDermott sought a return to the State Senate after Menza decided not to run for re-election so that he could seek the Democratic nomination for U.S. Senate in 1978. He lost to Anthony E. Russo, the Mayor of Union Township.

McDermott was co-founder of the law firm Apruzzese, McDermott, Mastro & Murphy of Liberty Corner, and he continued to serve as a senior partner there until he died in 2011. He had also served as Chairman of the New Jersey Turnpike and Highway Authority and as Trustee for Kean University.

Frank McDermott died on December 15, 2011, surrounded by his family.

Political offices
Preceded by Edwin B. Forsythe	President of the New Jersey Senate; 1969	Succeeded by Raymond Bateman
