= Walter H. Jones (New Jersey politician) =

American politician (1912–1982)

Member of the New Jersey Senate from Bergen County
- In office 1954–1962
- Preceded by: David Van Alstyne Jr.
- Succeeded by: Pierce H. Deamer Jr.

Member of the New Jersey General Assembly from Bergen County
- In office 1943–1954

Speaker of the New Jersey General Assembly
- In office 1946–1947
- Preceded by: Freas L. Hess
- Succeeded by: Leon Leonard

Chairman of the Bergen County Republican Party
- In office 1963–1966
- Preceded by: Frank V. Jerlinski
- Succeeded by: Nelson G. Gross

Personal details
- Born: Walter Henry Jones; August 18, 1912 New York City
- Died: July 19, 1982 (aged 69)
- Party: Republican
- Education: B.A. Rutgers University Rutgers University Law School

Walter Henry Jones (August 18, 1912 – July 19, 1982) was a 20th-century American lawyer and Republican Party politician who served as a New Jersey State Senator and was a candidate for Governor of New Jersey.

== Early life and career ==
Jones was born August 18, 1912, in New York City, the son of Oscar and Josephine Jones. He is a 1934 graduate of Rutgers University and received his law degree from Rutgers Law School in 1937. He received a Master of Law degree from New York University in 1942.

He maintained his own law practice with offices in Hackensack and Newark, and was an assistant professor of law at Rutgers Law School.

== Assemblyman ==
Jones was elected to the New Jersey General Assembly in 1942, and served consecutive terms in through 1953. He served as the Assembly Majority Leader in 1945 and as Assembly Speaker in 1946. Governor Walter Edge appointed him to serve as on the State Administrative Reorganization Commission in 1945.

== State senator ==
Jones was elected to the New Jersey State Senate in 1953 and was re-elected in 1957. Jones led a Senate investigation into garbage collection rackets and battled with New York politicians on their requirement that New Jerseyans who commute to work in New York pay a New York state income tax. Jones also focused on issues related to commuter transit, an issue that affected many of his New York constituents.

== Diplomatic Assignment ==
In 1954, U.S. Secretary of State John Foster Dulles appointed him to serve as a member of the Inter-Governmental Committee on European Migration. He held that post through 1955. In 1955, Jones surveyed European casualties in connection with he Refugee Relief Program.

== Campaign for Governor ==
Jones sought the Republican nomination for Governor of New Jersey in 1961, and at the start of the campaign he was considered the front-runner. He lost a particularly bitter primary contest with former U.S. Secretary of Labor James P. Mitchell. Mitchell beat Jones by 41,635 votes, 44%–35%. Jones gave up his Senate seat to run for governor.

== Republican Party chairman ==
From 1963 to 1966, Jones served as chairman of the Bergen County Republican Organization.

== Indictment ==
A federal grand jury indicted Jones in 1971 on charges that he covered up a $2.4 million bank fraud. He was acquitted of all charges in 1974.

== Family ==
Jones married Alice Ferris Henshaw (1916–2012) on May 5, 1939. He had four children: Walter H. Jones, 3d (Born 1942); Graham Oscar Jones (Born 1944); Susan Henshaw Jones (Born 1947); and Deborah Jones (Born 1952). He lived in Norwood, New Jersey.

== 1961 Republican Primary for Governor ==
Candidate	Office	Votes	%
James P. Mitchell	Former U.S. Secretary of Labor	202,188	44%
Walter H. Jones	State Senator from Bergen County	160,553	35%
Wayne Dumont, Jr.	State Senator from Warren County	95,761	21%
Louis Berns		4,376	1%
