= Malcolm Forbes =

American publisher (1919–1990)

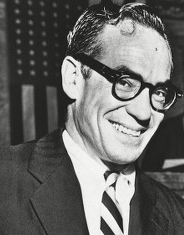
- Forbes in 1957

Member of the New Jersey Senate from Somerset County
- In office January 1952 – September 8, 1958
- Preceded by: Freas Hess
- Succeeded by: William E. Ozzard

Personal details
- Born: Malcolm Stevenson Forbes; August 19, 1919 Englewood, New Jersey, U.S.
- Died: February 24, 1990 (aged 70) Far Hills, New Jersey, U.S.
- Party: Republican
- Spouse: Roberta Remsen Laidlaw (m. 1946; div. 1985)
- Children: 5, including Steve and Christopher
- Relatives: B. C. Forbes (father); Forbes family
- Education: Princeton University (AB)
- Civilian awards: Pride of Performance (1983); Motorcycle Hall of Fame (1999); New Jersey Hall of Fame (2008)

Military service
- Allegiance: United States
- Branch/service: United States Army
- Years of service: 1941–1946
- Rank: Staff Sergeant
- Unit: 84th Infantry Division, 334th Infantry Regiment
- Battles/wars: World War II
- Military awards: Bronze Star; Purple Heart

Malcolm Stevenson Forbes (August 19, 1919 – February 24, 1990) was an American businessman and politician most prominently known as the publisher of Forbes magazine, which was founded by his father B. C. Forbes. He represented Somerset County in the New Jersey Senate from 1952 to 1958 and ran two campaigns for Governor of New Jersey. In 1953, he lost the Republican nomination to Paul L. Troast, who had the support of most of the party establishment. In 1957, he won the Republican nomination but lost the general election to incumbent Governor Robert Meyner. He was known as an avid promoter of capitalism and free market economics and for an extravagant lifestyle, spending on parties, travel, and his collection of homes, yachts, aircraft, art, motorcycles, and Fabergé eggs.

== Early life ==
Malcolm Stevenson Forbes was born on August 19, 1919, in Englewood, New Jersey, the son of Adelaide Mary (Stevenson) and Scottish-born financial journalist and author B. C. Forbes. He graduated from The Lawrenceville School in 1937. In 1941 he received an A.B. from the School of Public and International Affairs, now Princeton School of Public and International Affairs, at Princeton University, with a 176-page senior thesis, "Weekly Newspapers - An Evaluation." Forbes enlisted in the Army in 1942 and served as a machine gunner in the 84th Infantry Division in Europe, rising to the rank of staff sergeant. Forbes received a thigh wound in combat and received a Bronze Star and a Purple Heart.

== Business career ==
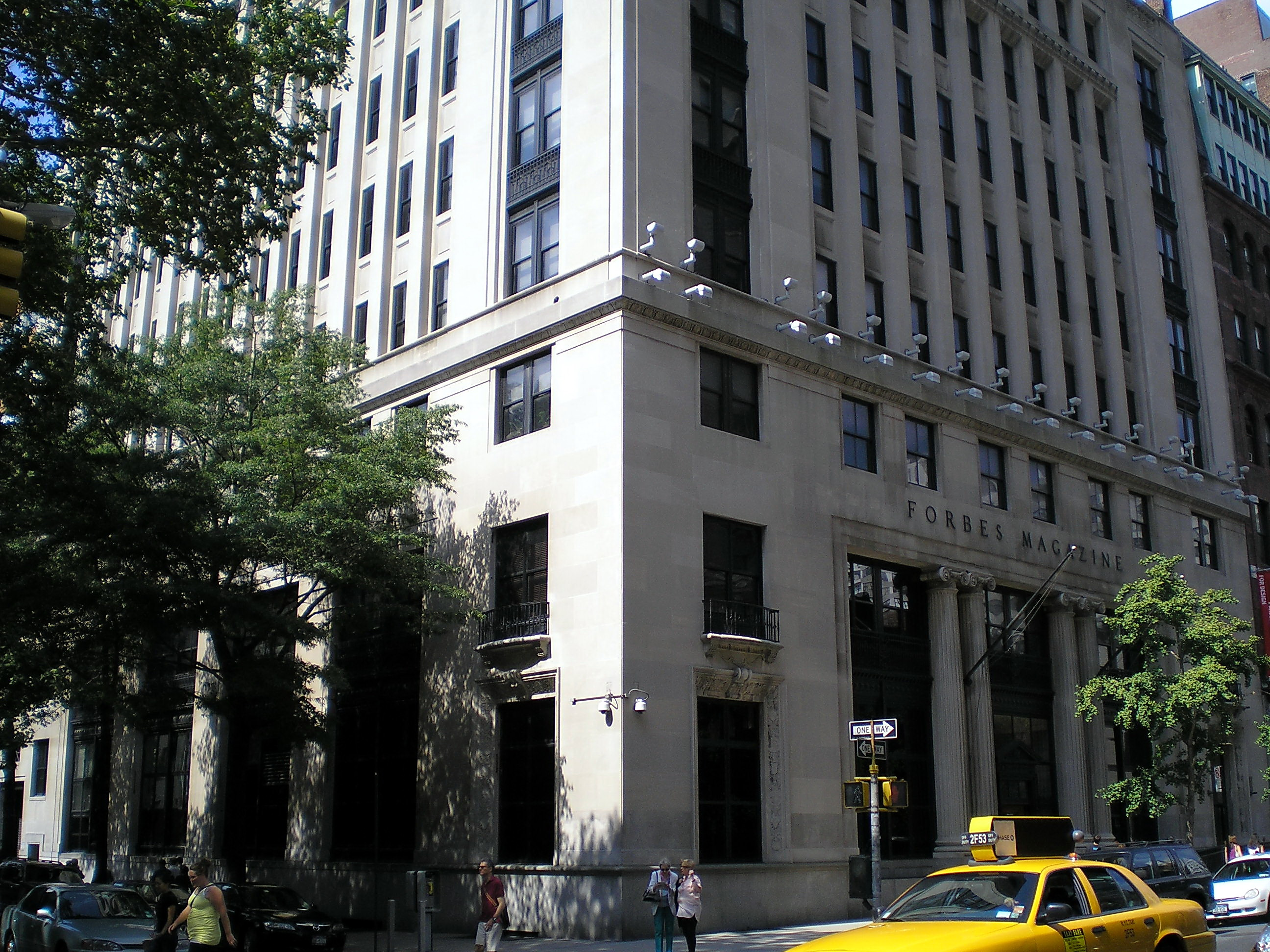
Forbes headquarters, New York City

After dabbling in politics, including service in the New Jersey Senate from 1951 to 1957 and two unsuccessful campaigns for Governor of New Jersey, he had committed himself full time to the magazine by 1957, three years after his father's death. After the death of his brother Bruce Charles Forbes in 1964, he acquired sole control of the company.

The magazine grew steadily, and Forbes diversified his investments into real estate sales and other ventures. One of his last projects was the magazine Egg, which chronicled New York's nightlife. (The title had nothing to do with Forbes's famous Fabergé egg collection.) To honor his contribution to the magazine, Forbes won the Walter Cronkite Award for Excellence in Journalism in 1989.

== Political career ==
Forbes was elected to the New Jersey Senate in 1951, representing Somerset County. He was re-elected to a second term in 1955 but resigned from office on September 8, 1958. While in the Senate, he unsuccessfully ran for Governor of New Jersey twice, in 1953 and 1957. In 1953, he lost the Republican primary to establishment favorite Paul L. Troast. In 1957, he won the Republican nomination but lost by a wide margin to popular incumbent Robert B. Meyner.

=== 1953 gubernatorial campaign ===
In 1953, he ran for Governor of New Jersey. He was defeated in the Republican primary by businessman Paul L. Troast, who had the support of incumbent Alfred E. Driscoll and 18 out of 21 county Republican organizations. Forbes ran as an outsider and conservative critic of the Driscoll administration. In a surprising upset, Troast lost the general election to Warren County state senator Robert B. Meyner after Troast's campaign was undermined by a series of Republican scandals.

=== 1955 re-election campaign ===
In 1955, Forbes narrowly won re-election to his seat. In a race later dubbed the "Battle of the Billionaires," he was challenged by Charles W. Engelhard Jr., who controlled his family's large international mining conglomerate Engelhard and later inspired the Bond villain Auric Goldfinger. Forbes had been heavily targeted by the state Democratic Party in order to preempt a challenge to Meyner in 1957, and the extremely wealthy Engelhard was their top recruit. As of 2013, observers believed this to be the most expensive state legislative contest in history. Engelhard spent freely to match Forbes's self-funded political machine. For example, he bought the Somerville Star to compete with Forbes's own local newspaper, the Messenger Gazette. At one point during the campaign, Engelhard reportedly sailed his yacht down the Raritan River wearing a white naval uniform to attract publicity.

Ultimately, Forbes survived by under 400 votes following a legal challenge and recount. Elsewhere, Republicans lost Senate seats in Burlington, Essex, and Salem counties, reducing their majority and raising Forbes's profile as a leading opponent of the Meyner administration.

=== 1957 gubernatorial campaign ===
Despite Dwight D. Eisenhower's 1956 landslide in New Jersey, Governor Meyner continued to grow in popularity. Although Forbes easily won the 1957 Republican nomination over Wayne Dumont, he lost to Meyner by over 200,000 votes, and Republicans lost control of the General Assembly. After his defeat, Forbes resigned from office on September 8, 1958, before the end of his second term, and retired from electoral politics.

== Personal life ==
Forbes was married for thirty-nine years to Roberta Remsen Laidlaw before their divorce in 1985. The couple had five children: Malcolm S. Jr. (Steve), Robert Laidlaw, Christopher Charles, Timothy Carter, and Moira Hamilton. Steve Forbes ran unsuccessfully for president in 1996 and 2000.

While living abroad, his father returned to Buchan, Aberdeenshire, every two years, staying in the Cruden Bay Hotel, "to entertain people of Whitehill to a picnic". It was a tradition revived by Malcolm in 1987.

=== Lifestyle ===
Forbes was an avid but idiosyncratic collector. Once quoted as saying 'he who dies with the most toys wins,' he accumulated a huge art collection and a collection of historical documents, as well as Harley-Davidson motorbikes and specially shaped hot air balloons. He owned more than 365 works by Peter Carl Fabergé, including a dozen Imperial eggs.

Malcolm Forbes' lavish lifestyle was exemplified by his private Capitalist Tool Boeing 727 trijet, ever-larger Highlander yachts, and his French Chateau (Château de Balleroy in Normandy) as well as his opulent birthday parties. In the mid-1960s he was a fixture at NYC's famous Cat Club on Wednesday nights, supporting local musical talent.

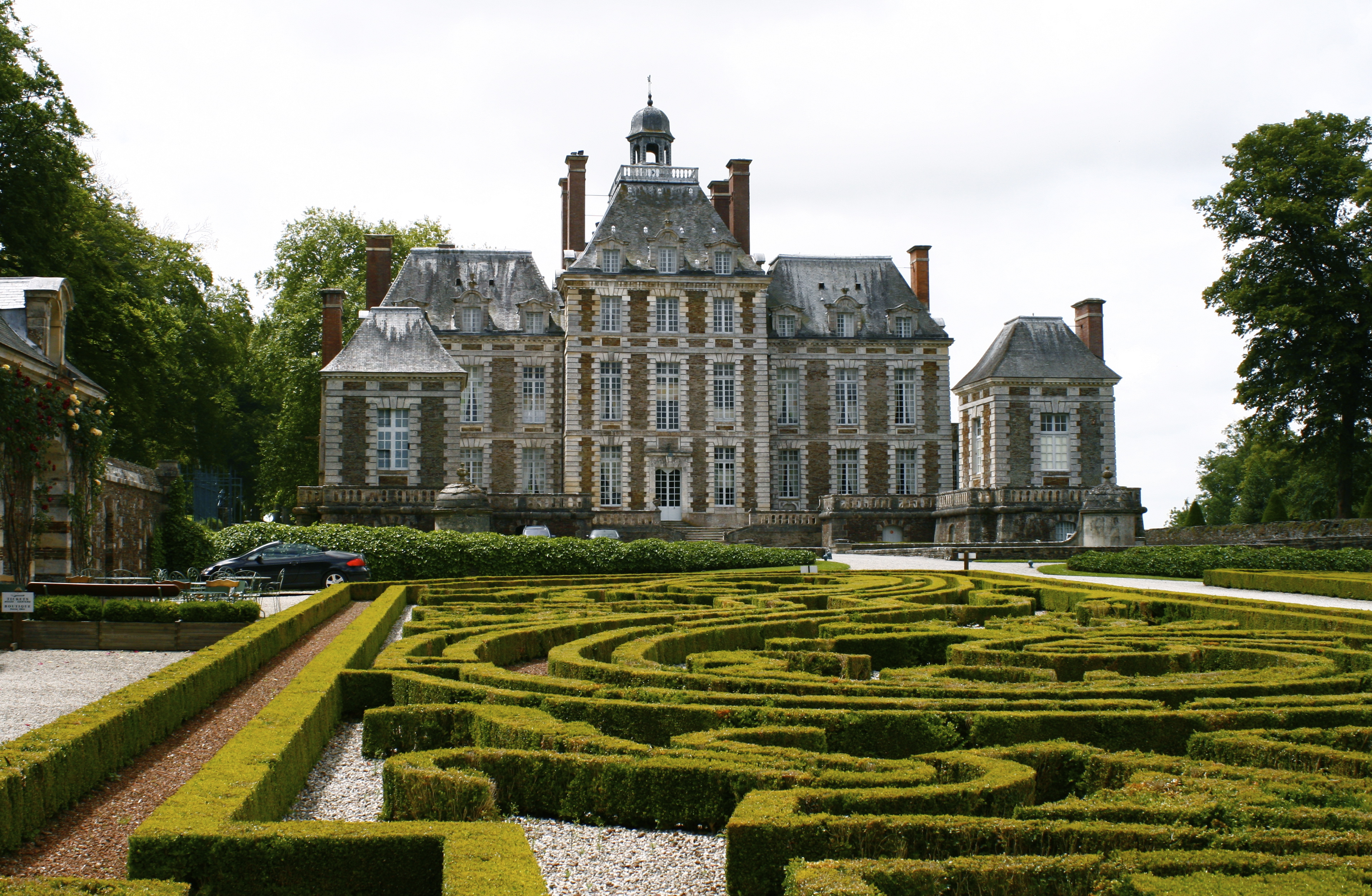
Forbes' Château de Balleroy in Normandy

He chose the Mendoub Palace (which he had acquired from the Moroccan government in 1970) in the northwestern city of Tangier, Morocco, to host his 70th birthday party. Spending an estimated $2.5 million, he chartered a Boeing 747, a Douglas DC-8 and a Concorde to fly in eight hundred of the world's rich and famous from New York and London. The guests included his friend Elizabeth Taylor (who acted as a co-host), Gianni Agnelli, Robert Maxwell, Barbara Walters, Henry Kissinger, six U.S. state governors, and the CEOs of scores of multinational corporations likely to advertise in his magazine. The party entertainment was on a grand scale, including 600 drummers, acrobats and dancers and a fantasia—a cavalry charge ending with the firing of muskets into the air—by 300 Berber horsemen. Party favors included a custom-engraved Rolex watch for each guest.

Forbes became a motorcyclist late in life. He founded and rode with a motorcycle club called the Capitalist Tools. His estate in New Jersey was a regular meeting place for tours that he organized for fellow New Jersey and New York motorcyclists. He had a stable of motorcycles but was partial to Harley-Davidson machines. He was known for his gift of Purple Passion, a Harley-Davidson, to actress Elizabeth Taylor. He was also instrumental in getting legislation passed to allow motorcycles on the Garden State Parkway in New Jersey.

=== Sexuality ===
In March 1990, soon after his death, OutWeek magazine published a story with the cover headline "The Secret Gay Life of Malcolm Forbes", by Michelangelo Signorile, which alleged Forbes was a gay man. Signorile was critical of the media for helping Forbes publicize many aspects of his life while keeping his homosexuality a secret. The writer asked, "Is our society so overwhelmingly repressive that even individuals as all-powerful as the late Malcolm Forbes feel they absolutely cannot come out of the closet?" Even in death, the media was reluctant to disclose his sexuality; when The New York Times reported on the controversy, they did not name Forbes in their coverage, referring only to news about a "famous, deceased millionaire".

== Death and legacy ==
Forbes died in 1990 of a heart attack at age 70 at his home, Timberfield, in Far Hills, New Jersey.

Since Malcolm Forbes's death, the magazine business has been run by his son Steve Forbes and granddaughter Moira Forbes.

== Awards and honors ==
- 1942 - Bronze Star
- 1942 - Purple Heart
- 1949 - Freedoms Foundation Medal
- 1974 - Golden Plate Award of the American Academy of Achievement
- 1983 - Pride of Performance award given by the then President of Pakistan

=== Posthumous honors ===
- 1999 - inducted into the Motorcycle Hall of Fame in 1999
- 2008 - inducted into the New Jersey Hall of Fame

== See also ==
- Forbes Galleries
- Forbes Museum of Tangier

Party political offices
Preceded by Paul L. Troast	Republican nominee for Governor of New Jersey; 1957	Succeeded by James P. Mitchell
