= 1957 New Jersey gubernatorial election =

- November 5, 1957
- Turnout: 74% of eligible voters (▲4 pp)
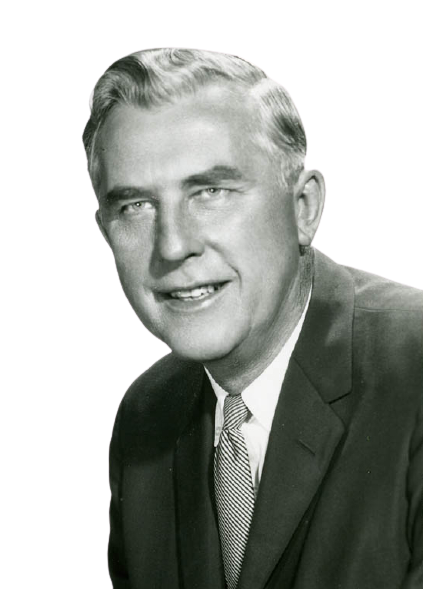

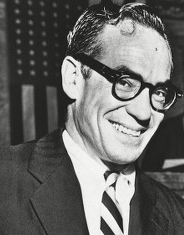
Nominee	Robert B. Meyner	Malcolm Forbes
Party	Democratic	Republican
Popular vote	1,101,130	897,321
Percentage	54.55%	44.46%
- County results Meyner: 40–50% 50–60% 60–70% Forbes: 50–60%
Governor before election
Robert B. Meyner
Democratic
Elected Governor
Robert B. Meyner
Democratic

The 1957 New Jersey gubernatorial election was held on November 5, 1957. Incumbent Democrat Robert B. Meyner defeated Republican nominee Malcolm Forbes with 54.55% of the vote. This was the first time in the state's history that a governor was elected to two four-year terms.

== Primary elections ==
Primary elections were held on April 16, 1957.

=== Democratic primary ===
==== Candidates ====
- Robert B. Meyner, incumbent Governor

==== Results ====
Democratic primary results
Party	Candidate	Votes	%
Democratic	Robert B. Meyner (incumbent)	192,657	100.00
Total votes		192,657	100.00

=== Republican primary ===
==== Candidates ====
- Malcolm Forbes, State Senator from Somerset County
- Wayne Dumont, State Senator from Warren County

==== Results ====
Republican Party primary results
Party	Candidate	Votes	%
Republican	Malcolm Forbes	216,677	63.72
Republican	Wayne Dumont	123,350	36.28
Total votes		340,027	100.00

== General election ==
=== Candidates ===
- Malcolm Forbes, State Senator from Somerset County and billionaire publisher (Republican)
- Henry B. Krajewski, Secaucus tavernier and perennial candidate (American Third)
- Robert B. Meyner, incumbent Governor (Democratic)
- Winifred O. Perry, insurance broker and former Verona councilman (Conservative)
- Albert Ronis, chicken veterinarian and perennial candidate (Socialist Labor)
- Anthony D. Scipio, Newark real estate broker (American)

=== Results ===
New Jersey gubernatorial election, 1957
Party	Candidate	Votes	%	±%
Democratic	Robert B. Meyner (incumbent)	1,101,130	54.55%	▲1.38
Republican	Malcolm Forbes	897,321	44.46%	▼0.22
Socialist Labor	Albert Ronis	6,306	0.31%	▲0.15
Independent	Henry B. Krajewski	6,256	0.31%	▼0.40
Conservative	Winifred O. Perry	5,949	0.30%	N/A
Independent	Anthony D. Scipio	1,526	0.08%	N/A
Majority				
Turnout				
Democratic hold		Swing		

==== Results by county ====
County	Meyner votes	Meyner %	Forbes votes	Forbes %	Other votes	Other %
Atlantic	26,223	45.62%	30,841	53.65%	421	0.73%
Bergen	132,805	47.32%	146,305	52.13%	1,529	0.54%
Burlington	30,175	56.28%	23,397	43.64%	41	0.08%
Camden	74,576	60.68%	47,884	38.96%	446	0.36%
Cape May	8,349	41.13%	11,127	58.77%	20	0.1%
Cumberland	19,520	58.76%	13,663	41.13%	37	0.11%
Essex	160,887	54.68%	127,436	43.31%	5,934	2.02%
Gloucester	23,297	55.02%	19,012	44.9%	30	0.07%
Hudson	144,388	58.05%	101,489	40.81%	2,835	1.14%
Hunterdon	9,208	49.58%	9,310	50.13%	54	0.29%
Mercer	56,881	66.16%	26,682	33.36%	413	0.48%
Middlesex	50,243	62.83%	28,682	35.87%	1,045	1.31%
Monmouth	47,664	49.81%	47,520	49.66%	499	0.52%
Morris	34,040	43.95%	43,110	55.65%	310	0.4%
Ocean	14,257	43.87%	18,185	56.0%	44	0.14%
Passaic	75,643	55.19%	57,217	41.75%	4,192	3.06%
Salem	11,968	61.24%	7,552	38.64%	23	0.12%
Somerset	24,802	54.1%	20,844	45.47%	200	0.44%
Sussex	8,057	46.03%	9,440	53.93%	8	0.05%
Union	94,430	55.16%	74,851	43.72%	1,911	1.12%
Warren	15,716	64.31%	8,411	35.64%	10	0.04%

==== Counties that flipped from Republican to Democratic ====
- Monmouth
- Cumberland
- Gloucester

==== Counties that flipped from Democratic to Republican ====
- Hunterdon
