= Reinhardt V. Metzger =

American politician

Member of the New Jersey General Assembly
- In office 1953–1956
- Preceded by: William F. Tompkins

Personal details
- Born: April 12, 1898 Philadelphia, Pennsylvania
- Died: 1975 (aged 76 or 77)
- Party: Republican (before 1961); Conservative (after 1961)
- Spouse: Agnes Kearny Lake (m. 1933, d. 1960)

Reinhardt Voorhees Metzger (April 12, 1898- 1975) was an American Republican Party politician who served in the New Jersey General Assembly and an Independent candidate for Governor of New Jersey in 1961. He won a Special Election for the New Jersey General Assembly in 1953 to replace William F. Tompkins, who had resigned to become U.S. Attorney for New Jersey. He was elected to a full term in 1953 representing Essex County, but was not a candidate for re-election in 1955. He left the Republican Party in 1961 to run as a Conservative candidate for Governor. He received 5,820 votes (0.27%) of the vote. He later served as President of the New Jersey Conservative Club. In a speech to the Central New Jersey Conference of Conservatives in 1962, Metzger said: "You will have to decide which is more important, your party tag or your principles -- your party label or your freedom and principles of life and government." Metzger urged conservatives not to vote for Republican candidates that failed to adhere to conservative principles, but instead write in the names of a better candidate. Metzger was born in Philadelphia. He was married to Agnes Kearney Lake (1907-1960) from 1933 until her death in 1960.
