= James P. Mitchell =

American politician (1900–1964)

James Mitchell
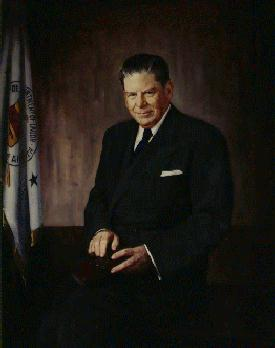

8th United States Secretary of Labor
- In office October 9, 1953 – January 20, 1961
- President: Dwight D. Eisenhower
- Preceded by: Martin Durkin
- Succeeded by: Arthur Goldberg

Personal details
- Born: James Paul Mitchell; November 12, 1900 Elizabeth, New Jersey, U.S.
- Died: October 19, 1964 (aged 63) New York City, New York, U.S.
- Resting place: Colonia, New Jersey, U.S.
- Party: Republican
- Spouse: Isabelle Nulton (m. 1923)
- Children: 1

James Paul Mitchell (November 12, 1900 – October 19, 1964) was an American politician and businessman from New Jersey. Nicknamed "the social conscience of the Republican Party," he served as United States Secretary of Labor from 1953 to 1961 during the Eisenhower Administration. Mitchell was a potential running mate for the 1960 Republican presidential candidate, Vice President Richard M. Nixon. However, Nixon chose Henry Cabot Lodge Jr. After an unsuccessful run for Governor of New Jersey in 1961, he retired from politics.

== Early life and education ==
Mitchell was born on November 12, 1900, and was raised in Elizabeth, New Jersey. His father, Peter John, died in 1912. His mother was Anna C. Driscoll. Mitchell attended Battin High School and graduated from St. Patrick High School in 1917.

== Career ==
He began his political career in 1932 as the Union County supervisor for the New Jersey Relief Administration. Six years later, he was appointed to the New York City division of the Works Progress Administration.

When Brehon B. Somerwell went to Washington, D.C. to lead the Army Construction Program, he made Mitchell head of the labor relations division. In 1942, Mitchell became director of industrial personnel for the War Department, in charge of one million men. After World War II he returned to the private sector; in 1947 he was director for labor relations and operations at Bloomingdale Brothers. In 1948 he was hired by the Army for personnel work in Germany, and was later responsible for a similar task in Korea. He also sat on the personnel advisory board of the first Hoover Commission.

=== Eisenhower administration ===
In 1953 Mitchell was appointed Assistant Secretary of the Army in charge of manpower and reserve forces affairs. Several months later, he was nominated by President Eisenhower to replace Secretary Martin P. Durkin, who had resigned in protest in September 1953.

On October 9, 1953, Mitchell became the eighth Secretary of Labor and served in that capacity for the remainder of the Eisenhower Administration. He fought against employment discrimination, and was concerned about the plight of migrant workers. He opposed right-to-work laws, believing they did more harm than good. During a top secret selection process in March 1958, President Eisenhower appointed Secretary Mitchell administrator-designate of the "Emergency Manpower Agency," making him one of the Eisenhower Ten.

==== Secretary of Labor ====
Mitchell encouraged management cooperation, supported labor's right to organize, and sought to improve conditions for marginal workers. He established the administrative machinery of the Landrum-Griffin Act, which weakened the ability of unions to conduct secondary strikes or picket to unionize a workplace. J. Ernest Wilkins Sr. was appointed Assistant Secretary of Labor for International Affairs in 1954, the first African-American to be appointed to the level of Assistant Secretary in American government. Representing Mitchell and the DOL, Wilkins attended Cabinet meetings—also a first for an African-American. In 1957, however, Mitchell determined to oust Wilkins. When in 1958 Wilkins resigned under pressure, Mitchell replaced him with George C. Lodge.

The Welfare and Pensions Plans Disclosures Act was established on August 28, 1958, followed by the Labor-Management Reporting and Disclosure Act on September 14, 1959. Mitchell opposed raising the national minimum wage to $1.25. Yet, he supported establishing minimum wages for the soft-coal industry and other industries according to the Walsh-Healy Act.

One of Mitchell's aides described his statements against state and national right-to-work laws in 1958 as causing "hell to break loose" in the right wing of the Republican Party.

In April 1959, at a labor rally, Mitchell said that if, by that October, unemployment was not below 3 million, he would "Eat the hat you said I was talking through". On November 11, it was revealed unemployment in October was 3,272,000. In a ceremony, he ate a hat shaped cake. He blamed his error on a steel strike. He is a member of the Labor Hall of Fame.

=== 1961 New Jersey gubernatorial election ===
After a bitter primary, Mitchell was elected Republican candidate for Governor of New Jersey with 43.7% of the vote, defeating State Senators Walter H. Jones and Wayne Dumont, Jr. He lost the general election to Democratic candidate Richard J. Hughes, receiving 1,049,274 votes versus 1,084,194 votes for Hughes.

=== Later career ===
Mitchell retired from politics and turned to the private sector. In 1961, he joined the Crown Zellerbach Corporation (at that time an American pulp and paper conglomerate based in San Francisco) as a director and adviser. A year later, he also briefly served as vice president for industrial and public relations, then as senior vice president for corporate relations until his death in 1964.

Unlike many of his fellow Republicans, Mitchell refused to support Barry Goldwater's presidential campaign in 1964.

== Personal life ==
His uncle was the character actor Thomas Mitchell. Mitchell married Isabelle Nulton on January 22, 1923. On October 19, 1964, Mitchell died of a heart attack in his suite at the Hotel Astor in Manhattan, New York. He is interred in St. Gertrude's Cemetery in Colonia, New Jersey. Mitchell was Roman Catholic.

Political offices
Preceded by Martin Durkin	United States Secretary of Labor; 1953–1961	Succeeded by Arthur Goldberg
Party political offices
Preceded by Malcolm Forbes	Republican nominee for Governor of New Jersey; 1961	Succeeded by Wayne Dumont
