= Charles W. Sandman Jr. =

American politician (1921–1985)

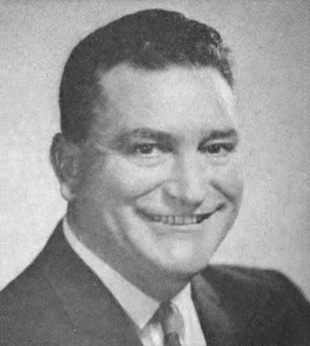

Judge of the New Jersey Superior Court
- In office 1984 – August 26, 1985
- Appointed by: Thomas Kean

Member of the U.S. House of Representatives from New Jersey's 2nd district
- In office January 3, 1967 – January 3, 1975
- Preceded by: Thomas C. McGrath Jr.
- Succeeded by: William J. Hughes
House positions
Member of the House Judiciary Committee

96th President of the New Jersey Senate
- In office 1964–1965
- Preceded by: William E. Ozzard
- Succeeded by: John A. Lynch Sr.

Member of the New Jersey Senate from Cape May County
- In office 1956–1966
- Preceded by: Anthony J. Cafiero
- Succeeded by: Seat eliminated

Solicitor of Lower Township
- In office 1951–1962
- Preceded by: T. Millet Hand
- Succeeded by: George James

Personal details
- Born: Charles William Sandman Jr. October 23, 1921 Philadelphia, Pennsylvania, U.S.
- Died: August 26, 1985 (aged 63) Cape May Court House, New Jersey, U.S.
- Resting place: Cold Spring Presbyterian Church
- Party: Republican
- Spouse: Marion L. Cooney
- Children: 6
- Education: Cape May High School
- Alma mater: Temple University (B.A.); Rutgers School of Law–Newark

Military service
- Branch/service: United States Army Air Corps
- Battles/wars: World War Two (POW)

Charles William Sandman Jr. (October 23, 1921 – August 26, 1985) was an American politician who represented Cape May County in the New Jersey Senate from 1954 to 1966 and represented southern New Jersey in the United States House of Representatives from 1967 to 1975. A member of the Republican Party, Sandman ran for the Republican nomination for Governor of New Jersey thrice, losing to Wayne Dumont in 1965 and William T. Cahill in 1969. He finally received the nomination by defeating Cahill in 1973, but lost the election to Brendan Byrne in a historic landslide.

== Biography ==
=== Personal ===
Sandman was born in Philadelphia, Pennsylvania. He graduated from Cape May High School, attained a bachelor's degree from Temple University in Philadelphia, and a law degree from Rutgers School of Law–Newark.

Sandman married Marion L. Cooney of Philadelphia and they had six children. Their sons, Robert S. Sandman, Charles W. Sandman III and Richard E. Sandman, followed their father's legal footsteps, establishing a law practice in Cape May Court House, New Jersey.

Sandman had a stroke on August 18, 1985, and died at a hospital in Cape May Court House on August 26, aged 63. At the time of his death, he was a resident of the Erma section of Lower Township, New Jersey, and was interred in Cold Spring Presbyterian Cemetery in Cold Spring, New Jersey.

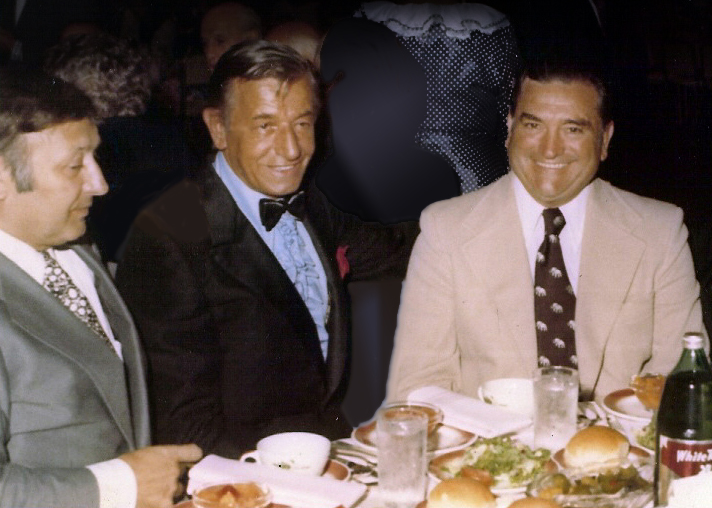
1973 – Charles W. Sandman (R), dining with "Mr. Atlantic City" Skinny D'Amato (C), and Chairman of the Committee to Legalize Gaming, Meyer I. (Mike) Segal (L).

Plaque at Cape May ferry terminal

=== Career ===
Sandman served in the United States Army Air Corps as a navigator during World War II, and spent seven months as a prisoner of war in Germany after being shot down.

Before serving in Congress, Sandman was elected to three 4-year terms in the New Jersey Senate, in 1955, 1959, and 1963. He held the post of Majority Leader of that body in 1964 and 1965. In 1966, he ran for Congress while still holding his State Senate seat, which he resigned upon winning the federal office. He was a delegate to the Republican National Conventions in 1956, 1960, 1964 and 1968.

In 1973, Sandman ran for governor as a conservative, defeating moderate incumbent Republican William T. Cahill in the Republican primary election in a victory that "shocked party leaders", according to The New York Times. In the general election, Sandman lost to Democrat Brendan Byrne in a landslide, following the pattern where New Jersey would often elect moderate Republicans to statewide office but consistently reject more conservative Republicans. As a result, Sandman's yawning margin of defeat caused a major drubbing for Republicans in the state legislative elections where they ceded control of both chambers to the Democrats with supermajorities.

Sandman was on the House Judiciary Committee when it considered articles of impeachment against President Richard Nixon. He was the most vitriolic defender of Nixon in the hearings. Notably, he insisted on hearing the specifics of each alleged impeachable offense. After the release of the "smoking gun" transcript, however, Sandman announced he would vote to impeach Nixon when the articles came up before the full House (as did every Republican who opposed impeachment in committee), calling their contents "devastating–impeachable."

In the 1974 Congressional elections, Republicans suffered generally because of the Watergate scandal that had by the time of the election forced Nixon to resign. Despite Sandman's change of heart on impeachment, his reputation was severely tarnished by his performance in the televised hearings. He was soundly defeated by Democrat William J. Hughes, his opponent in 1974, in an election that Sandman described as "not a Republican year" Following his defeat in his reelection bid for Congress, Sandman was approached by Vice President Nelson Rockefeller to join the Gerald Ford administration in various capacities including an ambassadorship of his choosing, Sandman declined and instead opted to accept Governor Thomas Kean's invitation to be appointed to the bench of the Superior Court of New Jersey.

== Legacy ==
In 1986 all members of the Lower Township School District school board agreed to rename Lower Township Consolidated School to Charles W. Sandman Consolidated School.

In the 2019 Apple TV+ series For All Mankind, actor Saul Rubinek played Sandman in a fictional storyline about NASA, Wernher von Braun and other space issues.

== Electoral history ==
=== New Jersey Governorship ===
New Jersey gubernatorial election, 1973
Party	Candidate	Votes	%	±%
Democratic	Brendan Byrne	1,414,613	66.67%	▲28.18
Republican	Charles W. Sandman Jr.	676,235	31.87%	▼27.79
American Independent	A. Howard Freund	6,412	0.31%	N/A
Independent	Alfred V. Colabella	5,088	0.24%	N/A
Socialist Labor	Robert Clement	4,249	0.20%	▼0.06
Libertarian	John A. Goodson	3,071	0.15%	N/A
Independent	James J. Terlizzi Sr.	2,670	0.13%	N/A
Independent	Stanley R. Knis	2,108	0.10%	N/A
Communist	Kenneth F. Newcombe	2,008	0.10%	N/A
Independent	Angelo S. Massaro	1,898	0.09%	N/A
Independent	Jack D. Alvino	1,843	0.09%	▼0.35
Independent	George Gilk	1,814	0.09%	N/A
Majority		738,378	34.80	
Turnout		2,122,009		
Democratic gain from Republican		Swing		

New Jersey gubernatorial Republican Party primary results
Party	Candidate	Votes	%
Republican	Charles W. Sandman Jr.	209,657	57.51
Republican	William T. Cahill (incumbent)	148,034	40.61
Republican	Michael A. Maglio	6,881	1.89
Total votes		364,572	100.00

=== United States House of Representatives ===
United States House of Representatives elections, 1974
Party	Candidate	Votes	%
Democratic	William J. Hughes	109,763	57.31
Republican	Charles W. Sandman Jr. (incumbent)	79,064	41.28
Independent	Andrew Wenger	2,693	1.41
Total votes		191,520	100.0
Democratic gain from Republican			

United States House of Representatives elections, 1966
Party	Candidate	Votes	%	±%
Republican	Charles W. Sandman Jr.	72,014	51.53	
Democratic	Thomas C. McGrath Jr. (incumbent)	65494	46.86	▼2.35
Socialist Labor	Albert Ronis	1,259	0.9	
Conservative	Linwood W. Erickson, Jr.	991	0.71	
Total votes		139,758	100.0	
Republican gain from Democratic				

U.S. House of Representatives
Preceded by Thomas C. McGrath Jr.	Member of the U.S. House of Representatives from New Jersey's 2nd congressional district January 3, 1967 – January 3, 1975	Succeeded by William J. Hughes
Political offices
Preceded by William E. Ozzard	President of the New Jersey Senate; 1964-1965	Succeeded by John A. Lynch Sr.
Party political offices
Preceded by William T. Cahill	Republican Nominee for Governor of New Jersey; 1973	Succeeded by Raymond Bateman
