= Henry B. Krajewski =

American politician

Henry B. Krajewski (July 15, 1912 – November 8, 1966) was an American pig farmer, and perennial candidate who ran for president of the United States in 1952 (for the Poor Man's Party) and in 1956 (for the American Third Party). He was also an American Third Party candidate for United States Senate from New Jersey in 1954. He also ran for governor of New Jersey three times, in 1953 (Jersey Veterans Bonus), 1957 (American Third Party), and 1961 (Veterans Bonus Now).

== Biography ==
Born in Jersey City, New Jersey, Krajewski had an imposing stature; he stood six feet tall (1.83 m) and weighed 240 pounds (109 kg). In 1952, he owned and ran a 4,000-pig farm in Secaucus, New Jersey. With printing-press operator Frank Jenkins as his running mate, his platform included a one-year tax moratorium for every taxpayer with an annual income below $6,000, and one free pint of milk a day in school for every child. He won 4,203 votes. In 1956, Krajewski's running mate was Anna Yezo, he got 1,829 votes.

== See also ==
- Jeff Boss
- Ed Forchion
