= Richard J. Hughes =

American politician and judge (1909–1992)

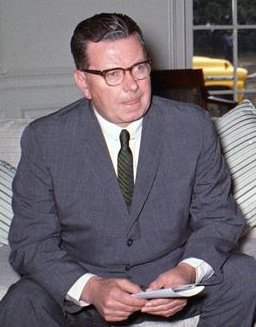
- Hughes in 1962

Chief Justice of the New Jersey Supreme Court
- In office December 18, 1973 – August 10, 1979
- Appointed by: William T. Cahill
- Preceded by: Pierre P. Garven
- Succeeded by: Robert N. Wilentz

45th Governor of New Jersey
- In office January 16, 1962 – January 20, 1970
- Preceded by: Robert B. Meyner
- Succeeded by: William T. Cahill

Personal details
- Born: Richard Joseph Hughes; August 10, 1909 Florence Township, New Jersey, U.S.
- Died: December 7, 1992 (aged 83) Boca Raton, Florida, U.S.
- Party: Democratic
- Spouses: Miriam McGrory (m. 1935; died 1950) Elizabeth Sullivan Murphy (m. 1954; died 1983)
- Children: 10
- Education: Saint Joseph's University (BA); Rutgers University, Newark (LLB)

Richard Joseph Hughes (August 10, 1909 – December 7, 1992) was an American lawyer, politician, and judge. A Democrat, he served as the 45th governor of New Jersey from 1962 to 1970, and as Chief Justice of the New Jersey Supreme Court from 1973 to 1979. Hughes is the only person to have served New Jersey as both governor and chief justice. Hughes was also the first Roman Catholic governor in New Jersey's history.

== Early life and education ==
Hughes was born into an Irish-American family on August 10, 1909, in Florence Township, New Jersey. He was the son of Richard Paul and Veronica Hughes (née Gallagher). His father was active in Democratic politics, serving as a state civil service commissioner, warden (then known as "principal keeper") of Trenton State Prison, now called New Jersey State Prison, and chair of the Burlington County Democratic Party. Hughes graduated from Cathedral High School in Trenton, Saint Joseph's University in Philadelphia and the New Jersey Law School, now Rutgers Law School.

== Lawyer and state judge ==
Hughes was admitted to the bar in 1932 and entered private practice in Trenton. He became active in Mercer County Democratic politics in 1937 and later became a Democratic state committeeman from the county, as well as president of the New Jersey Young Democrats. Hughes sought election to the U.S. House of Representatives in 1938 from New Jersey's 4th congressional district, running as a strong supporter of Franklin D. Roosevelt; he was defeated by Republican D. Lane Powers by a broad margin but established a reputation as a robust campaigner.

In December 1939, Hughes became a federal prosecutor at the U.S. Attorney's Office for the District of New Jersey. In that role, he prosecuted federal crimes, including against members of the pro-Nazi German-American Vocational League. Hughes secured numerous convictions, which bolstered his standing. Hughes stepped down as Assistant U.S. Attorney in June 1945, after being elected chairman of the Mercer County Democratic Party, and resumed private practice in partnership with Thorn Lord, who had been U.S. Attorney.

In 1948, Hughes was appointed by acting Governor John M. Summerill, Jr. as a judge of the Court of Common Pleas (which, after the state court system was reorganized, became Mercer County Court). After Superior Court judge William J. Brennan, Jr. was appointed as a justice of the state supreme court in February 1952, Governor Alfred E. Driscoll appointed Hughes to fill the vacancy on the Superior Court bench. Hughes was later appointed to be assignment judge for Union County and was thereafter elevated to the Superior Court, Appellate Division. As a Superior Court judge, Chief Justice Arthur T. Vanderbilt appointed Hughes as chair of a committee tasked with studying the state's handling of juvenile offenders and making recommendations for changes; the state supreme court accepted the committee's recommendations, leading to a reform of the New Jersey juvenile and domestic-relations courts.

Hughes was considered by Governor Robert B. Meyner as a possible nominee to the state supreme court bench. Seeking to support his large family, however, Hughes resigned from the bench in November 1957 in resume the practice of law. In his successful practice, Hughes' clients included the Association of New Jersey Railroads, Public Service Electric & Gas Company, and manufacturers of polio vaccines, whom Hughes defended in antitrust matters.

== Governor, 1962–1970 ==
Hughes was little known at the time he ran for governor of New Jersey in 1961, and was selected as the Democratic nominee only after the first choice of powerful party leaders, Attorney General Grover C. Richman, had a heart attack. Hughes proved to be a strong campaigner, however, and achieved an upset victory over Republican nominee James P. Mitchell, who had been U.S. Secretary of Labor during the Eisenhower administration, by slightly under 35,000 votes.

One of the important issues of Hughes' term as governor was state taxation; at the time Hughes took office in 1962, "New Jersey was one of only a handful of states that had neither an income tax nor a sales tax." Hughes suffered a political defeat when a bond question, which would have issued $750 million in bonds for capital construction, was voted down in the November 1962 elections. Hughes announced his support for enactment of a state personal income tax; consideration of the proposal was delayed by leaders in the state legislature. During Hughes' campaign for re-election, the tax issue was overshadowed by a political controversy arose when Eugene Genovese, an instructor at Rutgers University, publicly stated that he would "welcome a North Vietnamese victory" in Vietnam. Hughes' Republican challenger, State Senator Wayne Dumont, called for Genovese to be fired; Hughes criticized Genovese's views as "outrageously wrong" but robustly supported academic freedom.

With the backing of organized labor, Hughes was re-elected with 1,279,589 votes, with Dumont taking 915,996. In his second term, he pushed for passage of a state income tax. Although both chambers of the legislature had Democratic majorities, the bill failed, having passed the state House but being defeated by a single vote in the state Senate. In a compromise, the Legislature passed, and Hughes signed, the Sales and Use Tax Act, which established a 3% state sales tax effective in July 1966. Hughes said "that to turn down any broad-based tax would relegate the state to second-class status."

Hughes was a delegate to three Democratic National Conventions representing New Jersey. He attended Harry S. Truman's nomination for a full term as president in Philadelphia in 1948 (as an alternate), Vice President Hubert H. Humphrey's selection as standard bearer in Chicago in 1968 and Senator George S. McGovern's 1972 convention in Miami Beach.

Many credit then-President Lyndon B. Johnson's close friendship with Hughes as one reason that Atlantic City hosted the 1964 Democratic National Convention.

Hughes was one of three final candidates considered by vice president and presidential nominee Hubert Humphrey to be the Democratic Party's nominee for Vice President of the United States in 1968.

== Chief justice, 1973–1979 ==
After serving as governor from 1962 to 1970, he served as the chief justice of the New Jersey Supreme Court from 1973 to 1979, having been nominated for the post by his successor, William T. Cahill. When Hughes was chief justice, the court issued a unanimous ruling in the Karen Ann Quinlan case, allowing an individual the right to refuse medical treatment and the right of a guardian to exercise that right if the patient cannot.

== Later life ==
Hughes left the Supreme Court in 1979 after reaching the mandatory retirement age of 70, and returned to the private practice of law. In retirement, Hughes was of counsel at Hannoch Weisman, a New Jersey law firm, and split his time between Lawrenceville, New Jersey and Boca Raton, Florida. He served on a number of committees and boards: a committee for implementing Martin Luther King Jr. Day in New Jersey after it was made a federal holiday; a member of the Board of Directors of a bank, the Carteret Savings and Loan Association; and a board member of Robert E. Brennan's First Jersey Securities firm. He suffered a stroke in 1991, and died the following year of congestive heart failure in Boca Raton. He was interred at St. Mary's Cemetery in Trenton, New Jersey.

== Legacy ==
After Hughes' retirement, the New Jersey Legislature created a named chair in his honor at Seton Hall University School of Law. The building in Trenton, New Jersey which bears his name that houses the New Jersey Department of Law and Public Safety (headed by the Attorney General), the courtroom, chambers and offices of the State Supreme Court, the courtroom and several chambers and offices of the New Jersey Superior Court, Appellate Division, and the administrative headquarters of the statewide court system, was dedicated as the Richard J. Hughes Justice Complex, in 1982 in his honor.

== Personal life ==
Hughes had five sons, two daughters, and three stepsons. He married Miriam McGrory in 1935; they had four children. His first wife died in 1950; in 1955, he married Elizabeth Sullivan Murphy (died 1983), and they had three children. In 1972, Hughes would contact then-senator-elect Joe Biden, who he had previously never met, to provide support and advise on how to cope with the unexpected and sudden death of his wife Neilia Hunter Biden.

Several of his children have become prominent in New Jersey law and politics. Hughes' stepson W. Michael Murphy Jr., a former Morris County prosecutor, placed third in the 1997 Democratic primary for governor of New Jersey. Hughes' son Brian M. Hughes served as a Mercer County freeholder from 1998-2003, and as the Mercer County Executive for five terms, from 2004-2024. Brian Hughes died in 2025.

== Bibliography ==
- Wefing, John B. (2009). The Life and Times of Richard J. Hughes: The Politics of Civility. New Brunswick, N.J.: Rivergate Books/Rutgers University Press. ISBN 0813546419.

== Archival collections ==
- Richard J. Hughes papers (The Monsignor Field Archives & Special Collection Center at Seton Hall University) - Contains the professional and personal papers of Richard J. Hughes covering his time as Governor of New Jersey to his tenure as Chief Justice of the New Jersey Supreme Court, primarily from the 1960s-1970s

Party political offices
Preceded by Robert B. Meyner	Democratic nominee for Governor of New Jersey; 1961, 1965	Succeeded by Robert B. Meyner
Political offices
Preceded by Robert B. Meyner	Governor of New Jersey; 1962–1970	Succeeded by William T. Cahill
Legal offices
Preceded by Pierre P. Garven	Chief Justice of the New Jersey Supreme Court; 1973–1979	Succeeded by Robert Wilentz
