= Wayne Dumont =

American politician (1914–1992)

Wayne Dumont Jr.

Member of the New Jersey Senate
- In office 1952–1966
- Preceded by: Robert Meyner
- Succeeded by: Seat eliminated (Note: After the Supreme Court decision Reynolds v. Sims, the New Jersey Senate was redistricted. Rather than one Senator per county, Warren was combined with Sussex and Morris counties into a two-member district.)
- Constituency: Warren County
- In office 1968 – July 1990
- Preceded by: Milton Woolfenden Jr.
- Succeeded by: Robert E. Littell
- Constituency: 15th district (1967–82); 24th district (1982–90)

Personal details
- Born: June 25, 1914 Paterson, New Jersey, U.S.
- Died: March 19, 1992 (aged 77) Phillipsburg, New Jersey, U.S.
- Party: Republican
- Education: Montclair Academy
- Alma mater: Lafayette College; University of Pennsylvania Law School

Wayne Dumont, Jr. (June 25, 1914 – March 19, 1992) was an American Republican Party politician from New Jersey. He represented Warren County in the New Jersey Senate from 1952 to 1966 and northwestern New Jersey more broadly from 1968 until his retirement in 1990. He was the Republican nominee for Governor of New Jersey in 1965, losing to Richard J. Hughes.

== Early life and education ==
Wayne Dumont Jr. was born on June 25, 1914, in Paterson, New Jersey. His father, Wayne Dumont Sr., was a native of Phillipsburg, New Jersey, and prominent attorney and bank director in Paterson.

Wayne Jr. graduated from Montclair Academy. While he was attending Montclair, his father died of heart disease. Wayne Jr. then attended Lafayette College, his father's alma mater, in Easton, Pennsylvania. After graduating, he became a minor league pitcher for the former St. Louis Browns but decided to study law at the University of Pennsylvania Law School. After receiving his law degree, he moved to Phillipsburg in 1940, where he began practicing law.

Dumont served in World War II and assisted in the prosecution of Japanese war criminals.

== New Jersey Senate ==
Dumont was elected in 1951 as a Republican to represent Warren County in the New Jersey Senate; he was the first Republican to represent the county in nearly 75 years.

He was re-elected in 1955, 1959 and 1963, during which time he served as Senate Majority Leader, Senate President and Acting Governor of New Jersey. He was responsible for sponsoring well over 500 bills during his legislative career including the state's first school aid bill and farmland preservation law.

=== Gubernatorial campaigns ===
Dumont ran for Governor of New Jersey three times in 1957, 1961, and 1965.

He narrowly won the Republican nomination in 1965 against fellow State Senator Charles W. Sandman. Dumont's support of a state sales tax was an issue in the primary campaign, possibly attributing to the narrow margin. In the general election against incumbent Governor Richard J. Hughes, Dumont lost in a landslide. He made a campaign issue out of the pro-Marxist speeches of Rutgers University professor Eugene D. Genovese.

Dumont returned to the State Senate in 1967. In 1976, he was the only Republican to support Governor Brendan Byrne's call for a state income tax. Despite his opponents focus on the income tax, he was re-elected in 1977.

In 1988, he suffered a stroke, leading him to retire in 1990, before the end of his term.

== Personal life ==
Dumont married Helen S. Williamson on September 19, 1938. Their son W. Hunt Dumont served as United States Attorney for the District of New Jersey from 1981 to 1985.

From 1954 to 1960 he served as a member of the board of trustees to his alma mater, Lafayette College.

== Death and legacy ==
Dumont died at the age of 77 on March 19, 1992, due to congestive heart failure suffered at Warren Hospital in Phillipsburg, New Jersey. Governor James Florio ordered all flags in the state flown at half mast.

The Warren County Administration Building in Belvidere, New Jersey, is named after Dumont.

Political offices
Preceded by Bruce A. Wallace	President of the New Jersey Senate; 1956	Succeeded by Albert McCay
Party political offices
Preceded by James P. Mitchell	Republican Nominee for Governor of New Jersey; 1965	Succeeded by William T. Cahill
