= Robert B. Meyner =

American politician (1908–1990)

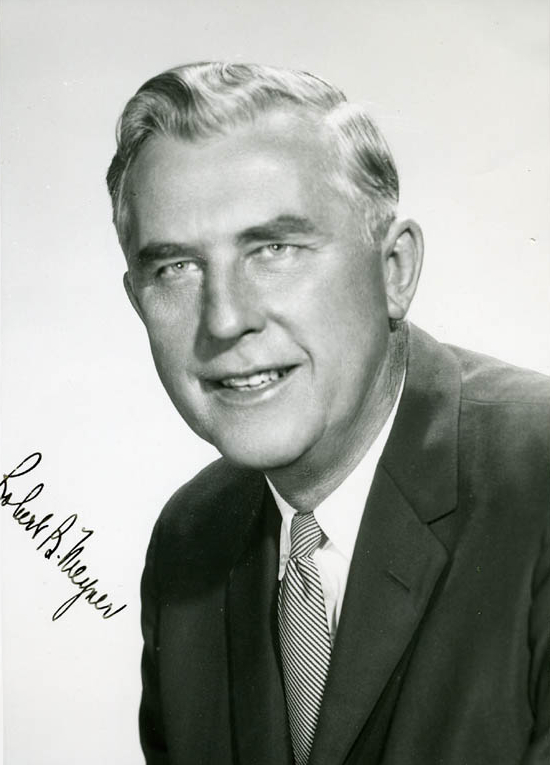

44th Governor of New Jersey
- In office January 19, 1954 – January 16, 1962
- Preceded by: Alfred E. Driscoll
- Succeeded by: Richard J. Hughes

Member of the New Jersey Senate from Warren County
- In office 1948–1952
- Preceded by: Harry Runyon
- Succeeded by: Wayne Dumont

Personal details
- Born: Robert Baumle Meyner; July 3, 1908 Easton, Pennsylvania, U.S.
- Died: May 27, 1990 (aged 81) Captiva, Florida, U.S.
- Party: Democratic
- Spouse: Helen Stevenson (m. 1957)
- Education: Lafayette College; Columbia Law School

Military service
- Allegiance: United States
- Branch/service: United States Navy
- Unit: United States Naval Reserve; United States Navy Judge Advocate General's Corps
- Battles/wars: World War II

Robert Baumle Meyner (/ˈmaɪnər/ MY-nur; July 3, 1908 – May 27, 1990) was an American Democratic Party politician and attorney who served as the 44th governor of New Jersey from 1954 to 1962. Before being elected governor, Meyner represented Warren County in the New Jersey Senate from 1948 to 1951.

As governor, Meyner reformed the New Jersey Democratic Party to move away from the domination of the Frank Hague political machine and political corruption scandals of the 1940s and 1950s and restructured state government to centralize and economize its administration. He was broadly popular as governor and is remembered for having increased the efficiency state government without instituting a sales or income tax through increased revenues from existing taxes. Politically liberal, Meyner opposed McCarthyism and criticized President Dwight D. Eisenhower while defending civil liberties and civil rights. In 1960, he unsuccessfully ran for the Democratic nomination for president as a favorite son candidate but finished fifth behind John F. Kennedy.

== Early life and education ==
Robert Baumle Meyner was born on July 3, 1908, in Easton, Pennsylvania, to Gustave Herman Meyner Sr. (1878–1950) and Maria Sophia Bäumle (1881–1968). His father was a German American loom fixer and silk worker from Manchester, New Hampshire. His mother was German, but born in Birsfelden near Basel, Switzerland, to Robert Bäumle from Harpolingen, Baden and to Franziska Oliva Thüring from Istein, Baden. Robert had an older brother, Gustave Herman Meyner Jr. (1907–1996), and a younger sister, Olive F. Meyner Wagner (1913–1982).

In 1916, the Meyner family moved across the state border to Phillipsburg, New Jersey. They briefly moved to Paterson, New Jersey but returned to Phillipsburg by 1922, living on Lincoln Street in a house built by his grandfather. As a young man, Meyner worked various jobs as a newspaper boy, grocery clerk, garage mechanic, and foundry handyman. He was employed as an apprentice coremaker by the Warren Foundry and Pipe Corporation and Ingersoll Rand.

In 1926, Meyner graduated from Phillipsburg High School and entered Lafayette College in Easton, Pennsylvania, where he majored in government and law. He financed his education by working in the silk mills near Easton and Phillipsburg, including as a weaver at the Gunning Silk Company. He was a brother of the Alpha Chi Rho fraternity and in 1928, Meyner formed the Young People's Al Smith for President Club at Lafayette, supporting the unsuccessful Democratic presidential candidate in the 1928 United States presidential election. In his senior year, Meyner was editor in chief of "The Lafayette", a student newspaper.

After graduating from Lafeyette in 1930, Menyer attended Columbia Law School, where he was awarded an LL.B. degree in 1933.

== Legal career and early political involvement ==
Following his graduation from Columbia, Meyner was employed as a law clerk in Union City and later Jersey City by J. Emil Walscheid and Milton Rosenkranz from February 1933 to April 1936. He was admitted to the New Jersey bar in 1934.

Meyner returned to Phillipsburg in 1936 to take over the practice of a deceased lawyer. He quickly became well-known as a trial lawyer and was admitted to practice before the United States Supreme Court in 1940 and developed a position in favor of judicial reform after "several early traumatic experiences with judges".

Through his active role in bar associations and local civic and social organizations, Meyner began to build a base of political support in Phillipsburg and Warren County. He made his first run for political office in 1941, when he lost the primary for Warren County's seat in the New Jersey Senate to Harry Runyon of Belvidere.

After the start of World War II, Meyner enlisted in the United States Navy Judge Advocate General's Corps, where he used his legal training to defend sailors in courts-martial and became commander of a gun crew on a merchant vessel. He was discharged with the rank of lieutenant commander, which he kept in the United States Navy Reserve.

In 1946, Meyner made another run for office, challenging Republican U.S. Representative J. Parnell Thomas. Thomas easily defeated him.

=== New Jersey Senate ===
In 1947, Meyner made another run for New Jersey Senate, defeating Wayne Dumont to represent Warren County. In the Senate, Meyner gained political experience and a reputation as a critic of the Republican administration of Governor Alfred E. Driscoll for failing to clean up corruption in Bergen County. Meyner cast the sole vote against the creation of the New Jersey Turnpike Authority, arguing that any such body would "become grossly irresponsible to the will of the people."

In 1950, Meyner became minority leader of the Senate and served as permanent chairman of the Democratic Party state convention. Despite his growing influence within the Democratic Party, he was defeated for re-election in 1951 by Dumont.

== Governor of New Jersey ==
=== 1953 election ===
After leaving office in 1952, Meyner's political career appeared to be at a dead end. Failing to carry his own home county, which was largely rural, and being an apostate from the Catholic Church were serious political liabilities in a party which relied on votes from urban Catholic communities. New Jersey was also increasingly Republican, having given a landslide victory to Dwight Eisenhower in the prior year's presidential election; the state had also not elected a Democratic governor since 1940 or United States Senator since 1936. However, Meyner exploited a rift in the party between former Jersey City boss Frank Hague and his successor, John V. Kenny, to win a surprising victory. When Hague and his faction attempted to regain power for the fourth time by backing Elmer H. Wene, a flamboyant chicken farmer from Cumberland County, for the 1953 nomination, Kenny turned to Meyner in desperation. Meyner accepted Kenny's support, later commenting, "I realized I had very little chance to win, but I knew it was the only chance I'd ever have. I jumped at it." Though Meyner won only three counties in the Democratic primary, he defeated Wene by 1,683 votes due to a 30,000 vote majority from Hudson County.

In the general election, Meyner faced Paul L. Troast, a respected contractor and chair of the New Jersey Turnpike Authority. Meyner campaigned for strict law enforcement and accused Republicans of making New Jersey "a mecca for syndicated gambling and a haven for the underworld." When newspapers revealed that Troast had asked New York governor Thomas Dewey in 1951 to commute the prison sentence of a convicted labor racketeer and extortionist, the ensuing scandal lifted Meyner to victory by 153,653 votes.

Gubernatorial portrait of Meyner.

=== First term (1954–58) ===
Meyner took a cautious but energetic approach as governor. In his first inaugural address, Meyner said, "I am a strong advocate of submitting important questions to the people on the ground that it makes for livelier, more responsive, more responsible democracy." He delivered a series of television and radio reports on the activities of his administration beginning in March 1954 and held two news conferences per week, with a separate conference for editors of weekly publications.

As governor, Meyner pursued a bipartisan approach, holding conferences with both party leaders ahead of legislative proposals and staffing his cabinet with Republicans and advisors from business and labor interests.

In his first year in office, Meyner concentrated on exposing corruption in the state Division of Employment Security, which was headed by former Republican governor Harold G. Hoffman. After discovering inefficiencies, Meyner hired officials from Prudential Insurance to accelerate payments and suspended Hoffman during the investigation. Hoffman died during his suspension; Meyner was initially accused of inducing his death, but a letter from Hoffman to his daughter shortly before his death revealed that he had embezzled $300,000 in state funds to cover a further embezzlement from the South Amboy Trust Company, of which he was president.

In addition to his efforts on corruption, Meyner's first term saw major reforms to the structure of the executive branch, reorganizing all fourteen state departments to provide more efficient and closer communication with the public. The state motor vehicle registration and budget bureau were centralized and streamlined. Substantial increases and reforms were made in state education, including increases in teachers' salaries, increased aid to handicapped children, and the restructuring of Rutgers University. However, faced with a Republican legislature, Meyner refused to restructure the state's tax system by introducing an income or sales tax, instead relying on increases in excise taxes to finance the rising budget.

Politically, Meyner rebuilt the Democratic Party of New Jersey, transforming it from a Hudson County-dominated machine to a true twenty-one county organization. He was a supporter of civil liberties and civil rights and a public critic of McCarthyism as a "perversion of basic American principles."

=== 1957 election ===
In 1957, Meyner faced state senator Malcolm S. Forbes. Despite Eisenhower's second landslide victory the prior year, Meyner had grown in popularity throughout his first term and easily became the first governor to win two four-year terms under the 1947 constitution. He defeated Forbes by over 200,000 votes, and the Democratic Party won control of the General Assembly. This marked the pinnacle of his political career.

=== Second term (1958–62) and 1960 presidential campaign ===
In his second term, Meyner raised his national political profile significantly. Shortly after his inauguration, he married Helen Stevenson, a distant cousin of 1956 presidential nominee Adlai Stevenson II and daughter of Oberlin College president William E. Stevenson. He embarked on national political tours, commenting on foreign policy and criticizing President Eisenhower. In November 1958, Time magazine featured Meyner on its cover as a potential candidate for the 1960 Democratic presidential nomination (along with five other noteworthy Democrats, including John F. Kennedy and Lyndon B. Johnson). At the 1960 Democratic National Convention, however, Meyner received 43 votes for president, finishing fifth behind Kennedy, Johnson, Stuart Symington and Stevenson. His decision to oppose Kennedy on the first ballot and withhold New Jersey's votes led to the decline of his political career.

Within New Jersey, Meyner focused his second term on transportation improvements and conservation. His administration spent $93 million per year on the construction of roads and establishing the Rail Transportation Division for rail improvements and consolidations. He initiated plans for the Port Authority of New York to assume leadership of the bankrupt Hudson and Manhattan Tubes. In 1959, his proposal for a statewide mass transit program was defeated by opposition from Hudson County and rural areas. He began reclamation of the Meadowlands region through the creation of the Meadlowlands Regional Development Agency and established a "Green Acres" program designed to regain land for recreational uses. He continued to increase funding for higher education, mental health treatment, juvenile delinquent rehabilitation, elderly care, and consumer protections. Amid a period of economic prosperity in the state owed to extensive investments in industrial plants and research, he continued to avoid broad tax increases by relying on the state's corporate income tax.

In 1959, Meyner appointed Thelma Parkinson as president of the New Jersey Civil Service Commission, making her the first woman to serve in the governor's cabinet.

Meyner left office in January 1962, prohibited from serving more than two consecutive terms.

== Later career ==
In 1962, Meyner and Stephen B. Wiley formed the law firm of Meyner and Wiley in Newark, New Jersey. (Wiley was later elected to the New Jersey Senate in 1973.) Meyner accepted lucrative positions with banks and insurance companies and became administrator of the cigarette industry's code on fair advertising.

After his Democratic successor, Richard J. Hughes served two terms, the Democratic Party turned back to Meyner as their gubernatorial candidate in 1969, but he was defeated in a landslide by U.S. Representative William T. Cahill.

== Personal life ==
Meyner married Helen Stevenson on January 19, 1957, in her hometown of Oberlin, Ohio. She was elected to the U.S. House of Representatives in 1974 and served two terms from 1975 until 1979.

== Death ==
Meyner had a stroke in 1986 and died on May 27, 1990, in Captiva, Florida.

Political offices
Preceded by Alfred E. Driscoll	Governor of New Jersey; January 19, 1954 – January 16, 1962	Succeeded by Richard J. Hughes
Party political offices
Preceded by Elmer H. Wene	Democratic nominee for Governor of New Jersey; 1953, 1957	Succeeded by Richard J. Hughes
Preceded by Richard J. Hughes	Democratic nominee for Governor of New Jersey; 1969	Succeeded by Brendan Byrne
