= Senator Sears =

Senator Sears may refer to:

- Dick Sears (politician) (1943–2024), Vermont State Senate
- Harry L. Sears (1920–2002), New Jersey State Senate
- Mason Sears (1899–1973), Massachusetts State Senate
- William R. Sears (New York politician) (1928–1998), New York State Senate
