= USS Nevada (BB-36) =

Dreadnought battleship of the United States Navy

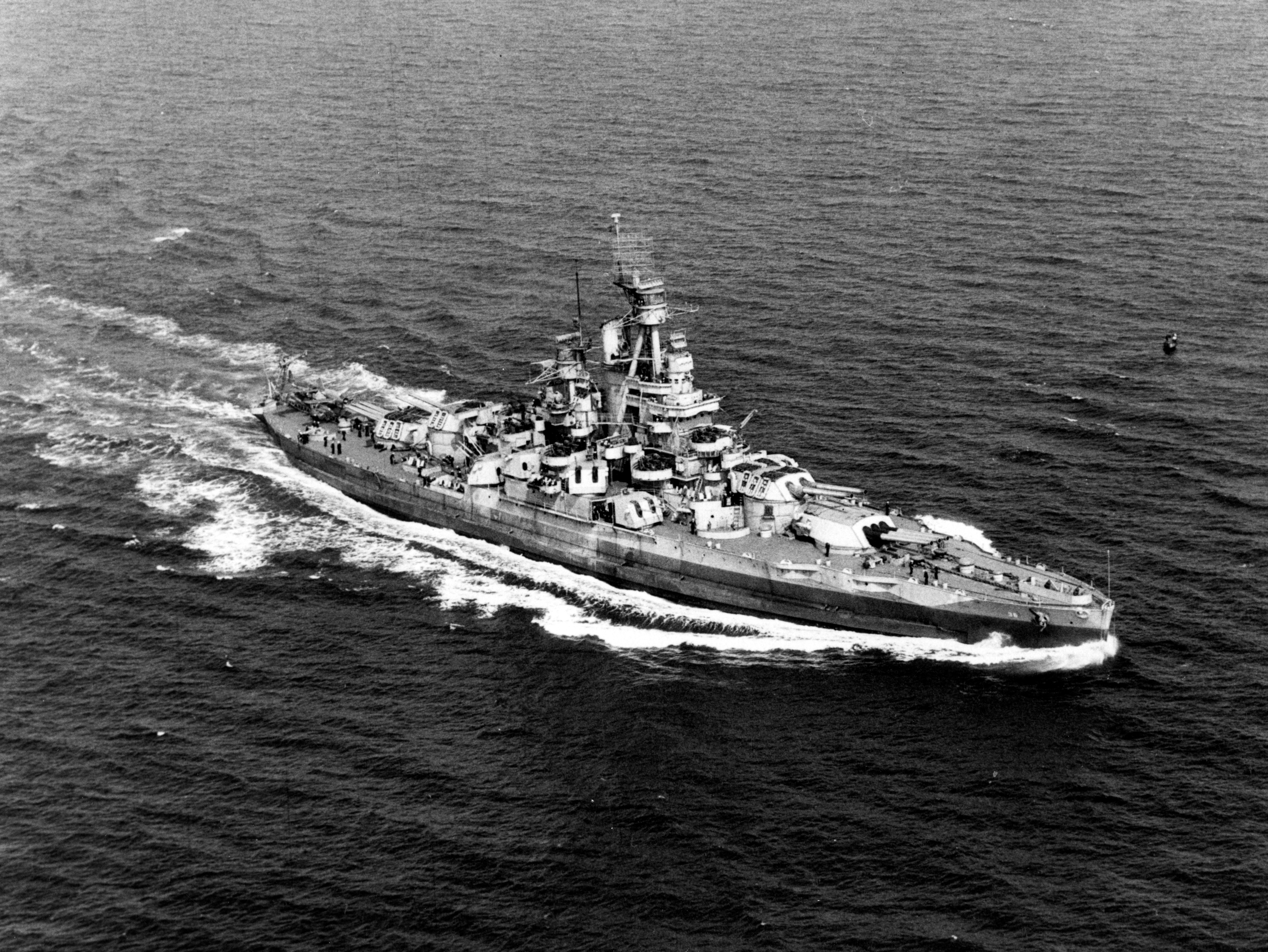
- Nevada underway off the Atlantic coast of the United States on 17 September 1944

History

United States
- Name: USS Nevada
- Namesake: Nevada
- Ordered: 4 March 1911
- Awarded: 22 January 1912
- Builder: Fore River Shipbuilding Company
- Laid down: 4 November 1912
- Launched: 11 July 1914
- Commissioned: 11 March 1916
- Decommissioned: 29 August 1946
- Stricken: 12 August 1948
- Nickname(s): "The Cheer Up Ship"
- Fate: Sunk as a gunnery target 31 July 1948, after Operation Crossroads

General characteristics
- Class & type: Nevada-class battleship
- Displacement: 27,500 t
- Length: 583 ft (178 m)
- Beam: 95 ft 3 in (29 m)
- Draft: 28 ft 6 in (8.7 m)
- Installed power: 12 Yarrow oil-fired boilers; 24,800 shp (18,500 kW)
- Propulsion: Geared Curtis turbines; 2 × shafts
- Speed: 20.5 kn (24 mph; 38 km/h)
- Endurance: 8,000 nmi (9,206 mi; 14,816 km) at 10 kn (12 mph; 19 km/h)
- Complement: 864 officers and men
- Armament: 10 × 14 in (356 mm)/45 cal guns; 21 × 5 in (127 mm)/51 cal guns (Note: The 5-inch (127 mm)/51 cal guns were soon reduced to only 12 because of their overly wet positions. In the late 1920s, 8 × 5 in (127 mm)/25 cal anti-aircraft guns (8 × 1) were added. In 1942, all were removed and replaced by 16 × 5 in (127 mm)/38 cal DP mounts (8×2), and 32 × 40 mm AA (8×4) and 40 × 20 mm AA (40×1) were added. See Fitzsimons 1978, p. 1982.); 2 × 3-inch/50 caliber AA guns (76 mm); 2 or 4 × 21-inch (533 mm) torpedo tubes (beam, submerged) (Note: All of the sources agree that the torpedo tubes were 21 in. tubes, but they conflict as to whether Nevada had 2 or 4 torpedo tubes. For more information, see a list of the conflicting sources.)
- Armor: Belt: 13.5-to-8 in (343-to-203 mm); Bulkheads: 13-to-8 in (330-to-203 mm); Barbettes: 13 in (330 mm); Turrets: 18 in (457 mm); Decks: 5 in (127 mm)
- Aircraft carried: 3 × floatplanes; 2 × catapults

General characteristics 1942 configuration
- Displacement: 30,500 t
- Installed power: 6 Bureau Express oil-fired boilers
- Complement: 2,220
- Armament: 16 × 5-inch/38 caliber guns (127 mm); 32 × 40 mm Bofors AA gun; 40 × 20 mm Oerlikon cannon
- Aircraft carried: 2 × floatplanes; 1 × catapult

USS Nevada (BB-36), the third United States Navy ship to be named after the 36th state, was the lead ship of the two Nevada-class battleships. Launched in 1914, Nevada was a leap forward in dreadnought technology; four of her new features would be included on almost every subsequent US battleship: triple gun turrets, (Note: The only US battleship class after Nevada that did not feature these "triple turrets" was the Colorado class, which carried eight 16 in (410 mm) guns in dual turrets to combat the new Japanese Nagato class.) oil in place of coal for fuel, geared steam turbines for greater range, and the "all or nothing" armor principle. These features made Nevada, alongside her sister ship Oklahoma, the first US Navy "standard-type" battleships.

Nevada served in both World Wars. During the last few months of World War I, Nevada was based in Bantry Bay, Ireland, to protect supply convoys that were sailing to and from Great Britain. In World War II, she was one of the battleships trapped when the Japanese attacked Pearl Harbor. Nevada was the only battleship to get underway during the attack, making the ship "the only bright spot in an otherwise dismal and depressing morning" for the United States. Still, the ship was hit by one torpedo and at least six bombs while steaming away from Battleship Row, forcing the crew to beach the stricken ship on a coral ledge. The ship continued to flood and eventually slid off the ledge and sank to the harbor floor. Nevada was subsequently salvaged and modernized at Puget Sound Navy Yard, allowing her to serve as a convoy escort in the Atlantic and as a fire-support ship in five amphibious assaults (the invasions of Attu, Normandy, Southern France, Iwo Jima, and Okinawa).

At the end of World War II, the Navy decided that, due to age, Nevada would not be retained as part of the active fleet and she was instead assigned as a target ship for the atomic experiments at Bikini Atoll in July 1946 (Operation Crossroads). The ship was hit by the blast from atomic bomb Able, and was left heavily damaged and radioactive. Unfit for further service, Nevada was decommissioned on 29 August 1946, and sunk for naval gunfire practice on 31 July 1948.

== Design ==
Profile of Nevada before her 1927 refit

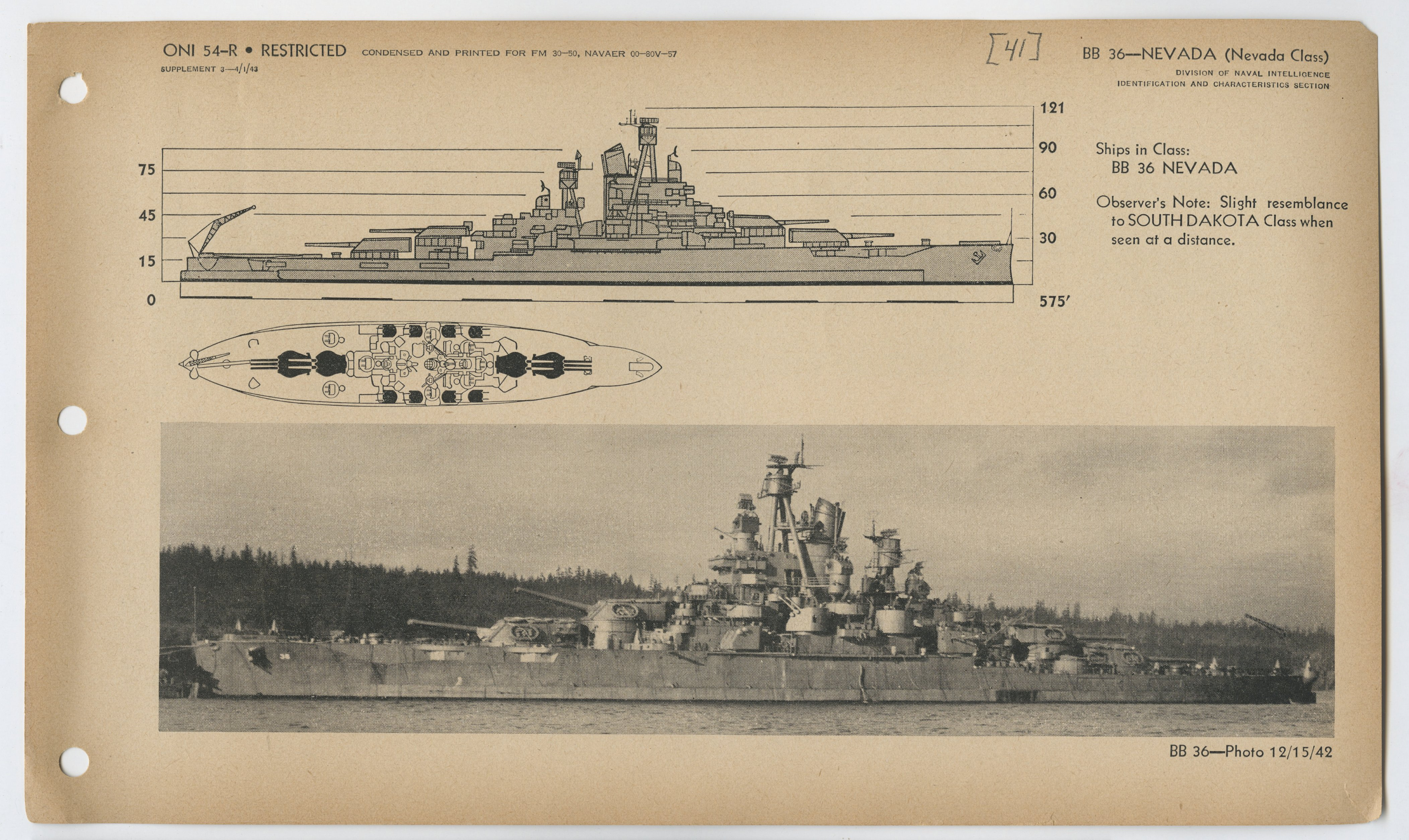
Division of Naval Intelligence identification sheet depicting Nevada after her 1942 repair and modernization

As the first second-generation battleship in the US Navy, Nevada has been described as "revolutionary" and "as radical as Dreadnought was in her day" by present-day historians. At the time of the ship's completion in 1916, (Note: Although Nevada was launched in 1914, construction was not completed until 1916. For larger ships, drydocks are typically only used for work that must be done in the drydock; once the hull is complete, the ship is normally launched into the water, where the rest of the work is completed. This is normally done to free up the drydock for other work.) The New York Times remarked that the new warship was "the greatest [battleship] afloat" because she was so much larger than other contemporary American battleships: her displacement was nearly three times that of the obsolete 1890 pre-dreadnought Oregon, almost twice that of the 1904 battleship Connecticut, and almost 8,000 long tons (8,128 t) greater than that of one of the first American dreadnoughts, Delaware—built just seven years prior to Nevada.

Nevada was the first battleship in the US Navy to have triple gun turrets, a single funnel, and an oil-fired steam power plant. In particular, the use of the more-efficient oil gave the ship an advantage over earlier coal-fired plants. Nevada was also the first US battleship with geared turbines, which also helped increase fuel economy and thus range compared to earlier direct drive turbines. The ability to steam great distances without refueling was a major concern of the General Board at that time. In 1903, the Board felt all American battleships should have a minimum steaming radius of 6,000 nmi (11,000 km) so that the US could enforce the Monroe Doctrine. One of the main purposes of the Great White Fleet, which sailed around the world in 1907–1908, was to prove to Japan that the US Navy could "carry any naval conflict into Japanese home waters". Possibly as a result of this, battleships after 1908 were mainly designed to "steam 8,000 miles at cruising speeds"; given the distance between San Pedro, where the fleet would be based, and Manila, where the Fleet was expected to have to fight under War Plan Orange, was 6,550 nmi (7,540 mi; 12,130 km), endurance was obviously a major concern for the U.S. Navy. Also, oil allowed for the boiler-room crew to be reduced—the engineer on Delaware estimated that 100 firemen (stokers) and 112 coal passers could be adequately replaced by just 24 men, which would allow some crew's quarters to be eliminated; this would save weight and also reduce the amount of fresh water and provisions that the ship would have to carry.

In addition to all of this, Nevada had maximum armor over critical areas, such as the magazines and engines, and none over less important places, even though previous battleships had armor of varying thickness depending on the importance of the area it was protecting. This radical change became known as the "all or nothing" principle, which most major navies later adopted for their own battleships. With this new armor scheme, the armor on the battleship was increased to 41.1% of the displacement.

As a result of all of these design modifications from previous battleships, Nevada was the first of the US Navy's "Standard" type battleships. "Standards" were characterized by the use of oil fuel, the "all or nothing" armor scheme, and the arrangement of the main armament in four triple or twin turrets without any turrets located in the middle of the ship. The Navy was to create a fleet of modern battleships similar in long-range gunnery, speed, turning radius, and protection. Nevada was followed by 11 other battleships of this type, although significant improvements were made in subsequent designs as naval technology rapidly progressed. An additional seven standard type battleships (USS Washington (BB-47) and the six of the South Dakota class) were never completed due to the Washington Naval Treaty.

The two battleships of the Nevada class were virtually identical except in their propulsion. Nevada and her sister were fitted with different engines to compare the two, putting them 'head-to-head': Oklahoma received older vertical triple expansion engines, which had proven more fuel-efficient and reliable than the direct drive turbines of some earlier battleships, while Nevada received geared Curtis steam turbines. (Note: See this book for more information on Curtis turbines (Scroll down to the bottom of the page): Ewing, James Alfred (1910). The Steam-engine and Other Heat-engines. University Press (University of California). p. 232.)

== Construction and trials ==
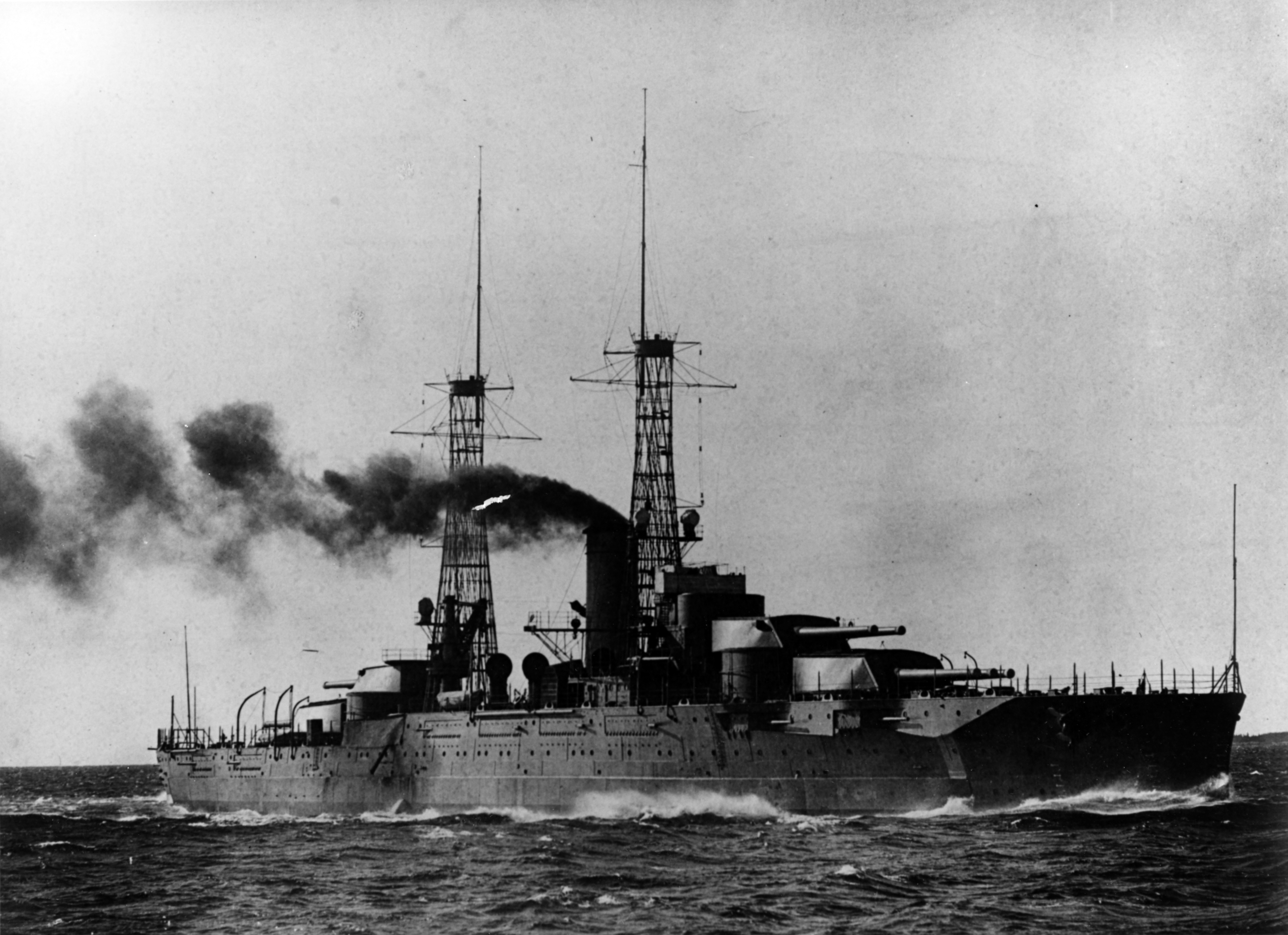
Nevada during her running trials in early 1916

Nevada's construction was authorized by an Act of Congress on 4 March 1911. The contract went to Fore River Shipbuilding Company on 22 January 1912, for a total of $5,895,000 (not including the armor and armament), and the time of construction was originally to be 36 months. A secondary contract was signed on 31 July 1912, for $50,000 to cover the additional cost of a geared cruising unit on each propeller shaft; this also extended the planned construction time by five months. Her keel was laid down on 4 November 1912, and by 12 August 1914, the ship was 72.4% complete. Nevada was launched on 11 July 1914; she was sponsored by Miss Eleanor Anne Seibert, niece of Governor Tasker Oddie of Nevada and a descendant of the first Secretary of the Navy, Benjamin Stoddert. The launch was attended by several prominent members of the government, including Governor Oddie, Governor David I. Walsh of Massachusetts, Senator Key Pittman of Nevada, Secretary of the Navy Josephus Daniels and Assistant Secretary of the Navy Franklin D. Roosevelt, who would later become the 32nd President of the United States.

Nevada then had to undergo many different tests and trials prior to her commissioning to ensure that she met the terms of the original contract. These began on 4 November 1915, when the ship conducted a twelve-hour endurance run "up and down the New England coast", reaching a top speed of 21.4 kn (24.6 mph; 39.6 km/h). Though her "acceptance trials" were interrupted on 5 November, because of a gale and rough seas, they were continued on the 6th with a test of her fuel economy; this consisted of a 24-hour run where Nevada steamed at 10 kn (12 mph; 19 km/h). The test results were positive: the oil consumption of the battlewagon was 6 lb per knot lower than the contract had demanded. Another test was conducted for 12 hours at 15 kn (17 mph; 28 km/h), with an even better result of 10 lb per knot lower than the contract specifications. After completing all of these tests and running trials off Rockland, Maine, Nevada sailed to the Boston and New York Navy Yards for equipment, torpedo tubes, and ammunition hoists. When all of the preliminaries were completed, Nevada was commissioned on 11 March 1916, at the Charlestown Navy Yard, and William S. Sims was the first captain of the new ship, followed by Joseph Strauss on 30 December 1916.

== World War I ==
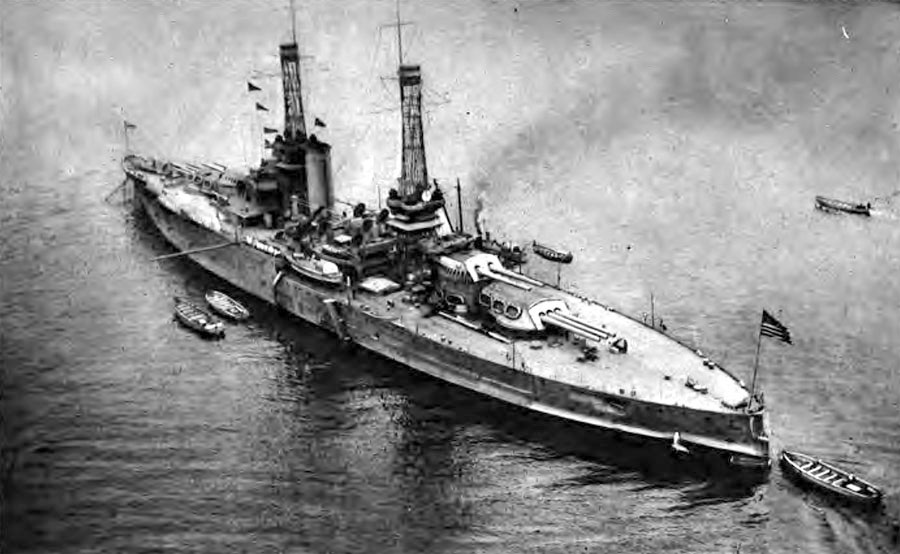
The stern of Nevada during WWI

After fitting out in the Boston and New York Navy Yards, Nevada joined the Atlantic Fleet in Newport, Rhode Island on 26 May 1916. Prior to the United States' entry into World War I, she conducted many training cruises and underwent many exercises out of her base in Norfolk, Virginia, sailing as far south as the Caribbean on these cruises. The US entered the war in April 1917, but Nevada was not sent to the other side of the Atlantic because of a shortage of fuel oil in Britain. Instead, four coal-fired battleships of Battleship Division 9 (BatDiv 9) (Delaware, Florida, Wyoming, and New York) departed the US to join the British Grand Fleet on 25 November 1917. They arrived on 7 December and were designated as the 6th Battle Squadron of the Grand Fleet. Texas joined them after damage from a grounding on Block Island was repaired; she departed on 30 January, and arrived in Scotland on 11 February. It was not until 13 August 1918, that Nevada, then under command of Andrew T. Long (14 February 1918 – 14 October 1918), left the US for Britain, becoming the last American ship to join the Fleet overseas.

After a 10-day voyage, she arrived in Berehaven, Ireland, on 23 August. Along with Utah and her sister Oklahoma, the three were nicknamed the "Bantry Bay Squadron"; officially, they were Battleship Division Six (BatDiv 6) under the command of Rear Admiral Thomas S. Rodgers, who chose Utah as his flagship. For the rest of the war, the three ships operated from the bay, escorting the large and valuable convoys bound for the British Isles to ensure no German heavy surface ships could slip past the British Grand Fleet and annihilate the merchant ships and their weak escorts of older cruisers. This never came to pass, and the war ended on 11 November, with Nevada, then under command of William Carey Cole (14 October 1918 – 7 May 1919), not getting a chance to engage an enemy during the war. (Note: Also, at some point during her time on the eastern side of the Atlantic, Nevada apparently made a patrol through the North Sea, but sources do not give any date. See DANFS Nevada (BB-36) and Bonner 1996, p. 102.)

On 13 December 10 battleships, including Nevada, (Note: The other nine battleships were Florida, Utah, Wyoming, Arkansas, New York, Texas, Oklahoma, Pennsylvania and Arizona.) and 28 destroyers escorted the ocean liner George Washington, with president Woodrow Wilson embarked, into Brest, France, during the last day of Wilson's journey to the country so he could attend the Paris Peace Conference. The flotilla met George Washington and her escorts (Pennsylvania and four destroyers) just off Brest and escorted them into the port. The 10 battleships sailed for home at 14:00 on the next day, 14 December. They took less than two weeks to cross the Atlantic, and arrived in New York on 26 December to parades and celebrations.

== Interwar period ==
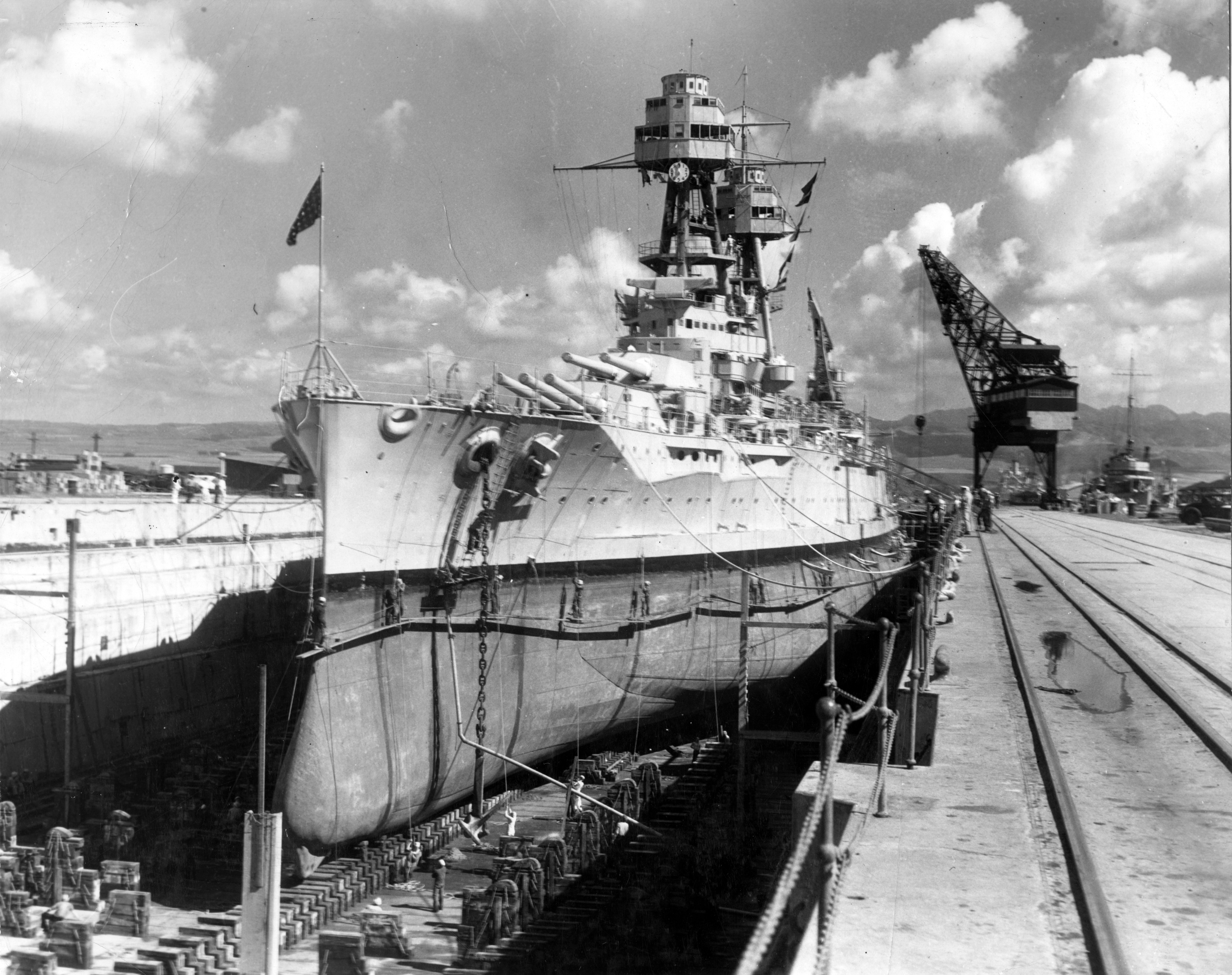
Nevada in drydock at Pearl Harbor Navy Yard, c. 1935

Between the two World Wars, Nevada, under the successive commands of Thomas P. Magruder (8 May 1919 – 23 October 1919), followed by William Dugald MacDougall (23 October 1919 – 4 May 1920), served in both the Atlantic and Pacific Fleets. Though she had originally been equipped with 21 five-inch (127 mm)/51 cal guns to defend against enemy destroyers, this number was reduced to 12 in 1918, due to the overly wet bow and stern positions of the other nine.

Nevada, then under command of Luke McNamee (4 May 1920 – 19 September 1921), and with the battleship Arizona, represented the United States at the Peruvian Centennial Exposition in July 1921. A year later, with Douglas E. Dismukes (11 October 1921 – 30 December 1922) in command, and in company with Maryland this time, Nevada returned to South America as an escort to the steamer Pan America with Secretary of State Charles Evans Hughes embarked; they all attended the Centennial of Brazilian Independence in Rio de Janeiro, celebrated from 5 to 11 September 1922. The New York Times later credited the crew of Nevada for bringing baseball and that sport's unique terminology to Brazil, allowing the country to "make the Yankee game an institution of their own". At the end of 1922, John M. Luby (30 December 1922 – 7 September 1924) assumed command. Three years later, then under command of David W. Todd (7 September 1924 – 11 June 1926), Nevada took part in the US Fleet's "goodwill cruise" to Australia and New Zealand, from July–September 1925. During this cruise, the ships had only limited replenishment opportunities, but they still made it to Australia and back without undue difficulty. This demonstrated to those allies and Japan that the US Navy had the ability to conduct transpacific operations and meet the Imperial Japanese Navy in their home waters, where both Japanese and American war plans expected the "decisive battle" to be fought, if it should come.

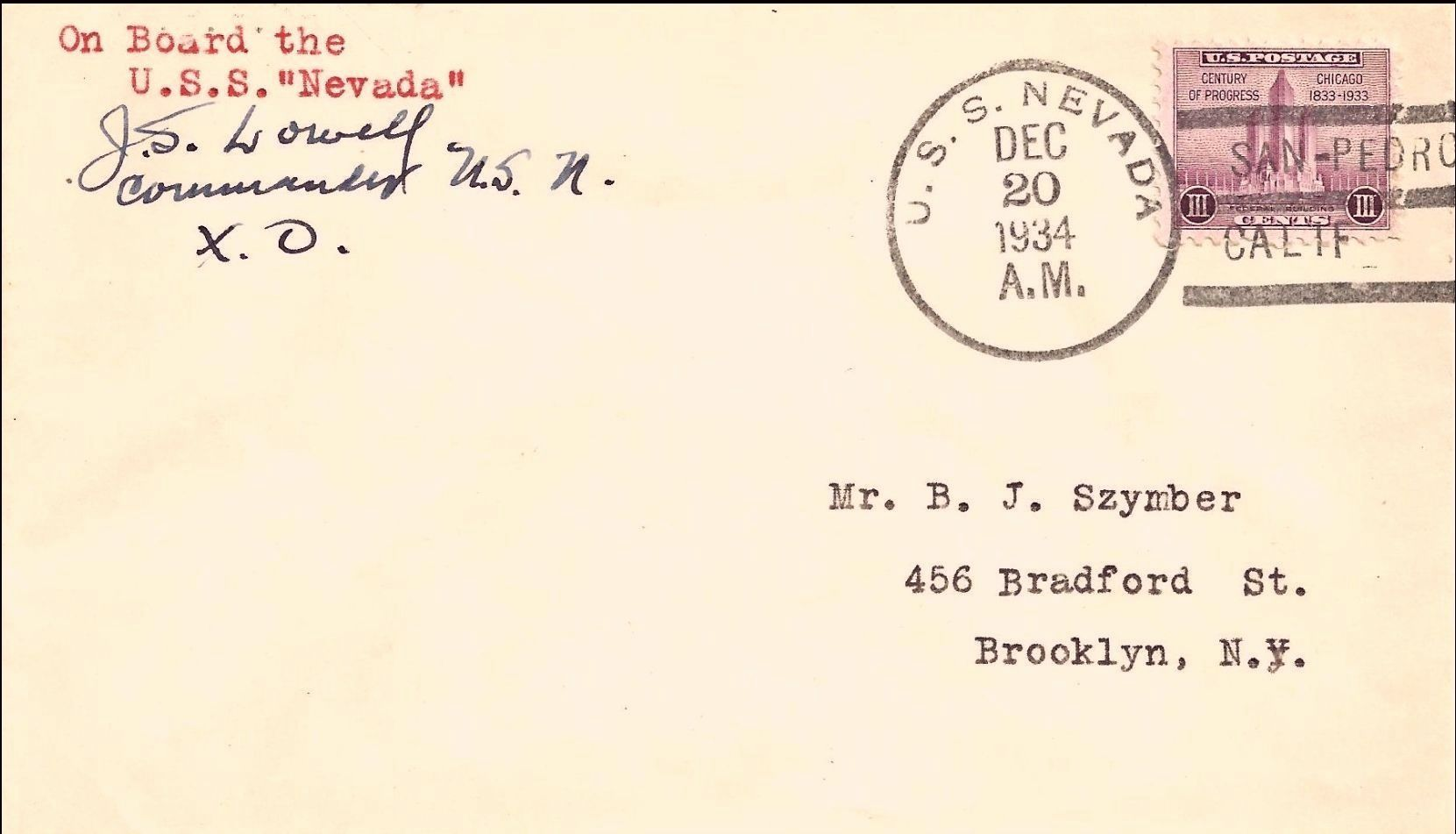
USS Nevada, naval cover signed by J.S. Lowell, X.O., postmarked 20 December 1934, in Naval Post Office, aboard Nevada

After the cruise, Nevada, with Clarence S. Kempff (11 June 1926 – 20 September 1927) commanding, put into Norfolk Navy Yard to be modernized between August 1927 and January 1930. Hilary H. Royall (14 January 1928 – 12 July 1930) took over command during this period. Work on the ship included exchange of her "basket" masts for tripod masts and her steam turbines for those from the recently stricken battleship North Dakota. These were geared turbines that had been retrofitted to North Dakota in 1917, replacing her original direct drive turbines to increase her range. Additionally, many different adaptations and additions were made: her main guns' elevation was increased to 30° (which upped the range of the guns from 23,000 yd (21,000 m) to 34,000 yd (31,100 m)), anti-torpedo bulges were added, her 12 original Yarrow boilers were replaced with 6 more efficient Bureau Express boilers in a new arrangement to accommodate those bulges, two catapults were added for three Vought O2U-3 Corsair biplane spotter aircraft, eight 5 in (127 mm)/25 cal AA guns were added, a new superstructure was installed, and her 5-inch (127 mm) 51 cal secondary battery was relocated above the hull in an arrangement similar to that of the New Mexico class. Nevada then served in the Pacific Fleet for the next eleven years. During this time, she was commanded by John J. Hyland (12 July 1930 – 30 April 1932), William S. Pye (30 April 1932 – 4 December 1933), Adolphus Staton (4 December 1933 – 25 June 1935), Robert L. Ghormley (25 June 1935 – 23 June 1936), Claude B. Mayo (23 June 1936 – 2 October 1937), Robert Alfred Theobald (2 October 1937 – 10 May 1939) and Francis W. Rockwell.(10 May 1939 – 4 June 1941)

== World War II ==
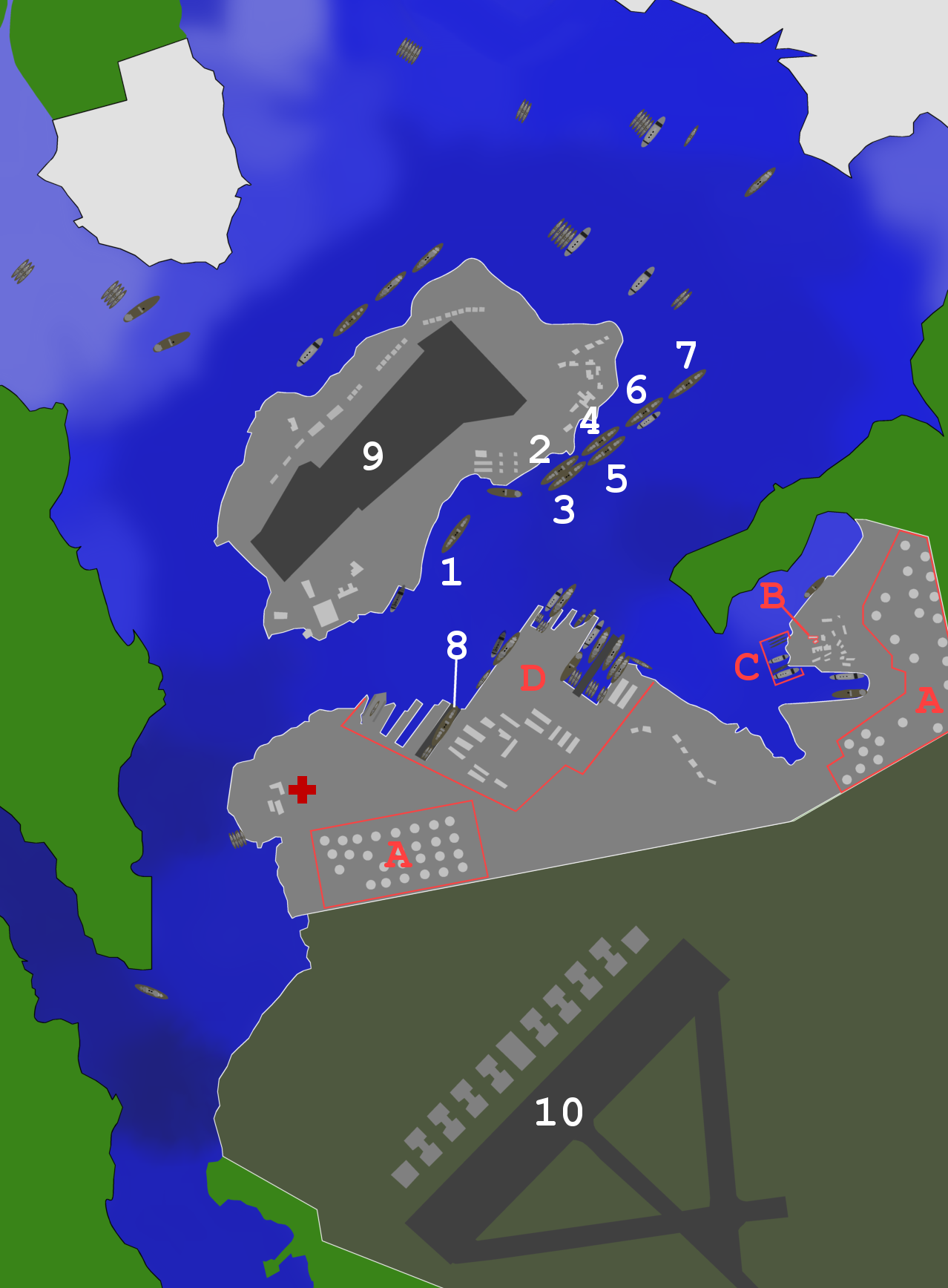
Map of ships and port facilities in Pearl Harbor during the attack; Nevada is #7. Click on the image for a key.

=== Attack on Pearl Harbor ===
On 6 December 1941, a Saturday, all of the Pacific Fleet's battleships were in port for the weekend for the first time since 4 July. Normally, they took turns spending time in port: six would be out with Vice Admiral William S. Pye's battleship Task Force One one weekend, while the next weekend would find three ranging with Vice Admiral William Halsey, Jr.'s aircraft carrier task force. However, because Halsey could not afford to take the slow battleships with his fast carriers on his dash to reinforce Wake Island's Marine detachment with fighters and because it was Pye's turn to rest in port and the harbor was where it was considered safe, none of the battleships were sailing on that morning. When the sun rose over Nevada on the 7th, the ship's band was playing "Morning Colors"; but planes then appeared on the horizon and the attack on Pearl Harbor began.

Aft of Arizona during the attack, Nevada was not moored alongside another battleship off Ford Island, and therefore was able to maneuver, unlike the other seven battleships present. (Note: Pennsylvania was in drydock at the time of the attack. Of the anchored ships on Battleship Row (in order, north to south), Nevada was moored singly; Arizona had Vestal moored outboard of her; Tennessee and West Virginia were moored together; and Maryland and Oklahoma were moored together. California was moored singly at the bottom of the "row", similar to Nevada, and should have had the ability to maneuver like Nevada did. However, California, as "she was about to undergo a material inspection [and] watertight integrity was not at its maximum" (see DANFS California (BB-44)), started settling as soon as she was hit by Japanese bombs and torpedoes. As a result, she sank soon after the attack began after being hit with just two bombs and two torpedoes. By comparison, Nevada took at least six bombs and one torpedo, and was still afloat when she was ordered to be beached by Hospital Point.) Commanding officer Francis W. Scanland (4 June 1941 – 15 December 1941), was ashore when the attack began. The Officer of the Deck, Ensign Joe Taussig (son of the admiral of the same name), had earlier that morning ordered a second boiler lit off, planning to switch the power load from one boiler to the other around 0800. As Nevada's gunners opened fire and her engineers started to raise steam, a single 18 in (460 mm) Type 91 Mod 2 torpedo exploded against Frame 41 about 14 ft (4.3 m) above the keel at 0810. Seconds later, the same Kate torpedo bomber that dropped the torpedo was shot down by Nevada's gunners. The torpedo bulkhead held, but leaking through joints caused flooding of port side compartments below the first platform deck between frames 30 and 43 and a list of 4–5°. Her damage control crew corrected the list by counter-flooding and Nevada got underway at 0840, her gunners already having shot down four planes. Ensign Taussig's efficiency paid off, likely saving his ship, but he lost a leg in the attack.

Nevada became a prime target for Japanese Val dive bombers during the second wave. Japanese pilots intended to sink her in the channel, ostensibly to block the harbor. This was poor target selection on the part of the pilots; she could not be sunk by 14–18 dive bombers attacking with 250 kg bombs and the channel's width of 1200 feet made bottling up the harbor impossible. As she steamed past Ten-Ten Dock (Note: Named for its length, 1010 feet.) at about 09:50, Nevada was struck by five bombs. One exploded over the crew's galley at Frame 80. Another struck the port director platform and exploded at the base of the stack on the upper deck. Yet another hit near No. 1 turret inboard from the port waterway and blew large holes in the upper and main decks. Two struck the forecastle near Frame 15; one passed out through the side of the second deck before exploding, but the other exploded within the ship near the gasoline tank; leakage and vapors from this tank caused intense fires around the ship.

The gasoline fires that flared up around Turret 1 might have caused more critical damage if the main magazines had not been empty. For several days prior to the attack, all of the 14-inch-gun (356 mm) battleships had been replacing their standard-weight main battery projectiles with a new heavier projectile that offered greater penetration and a larger explosive charge in exchange for a slight decrease in range. All of the older projectiles and powder charges had been removed from the magazines of Nevada, and the crew had taken a break after loading the new projectiles in anticipation of loading the new powder charges on Sunday.

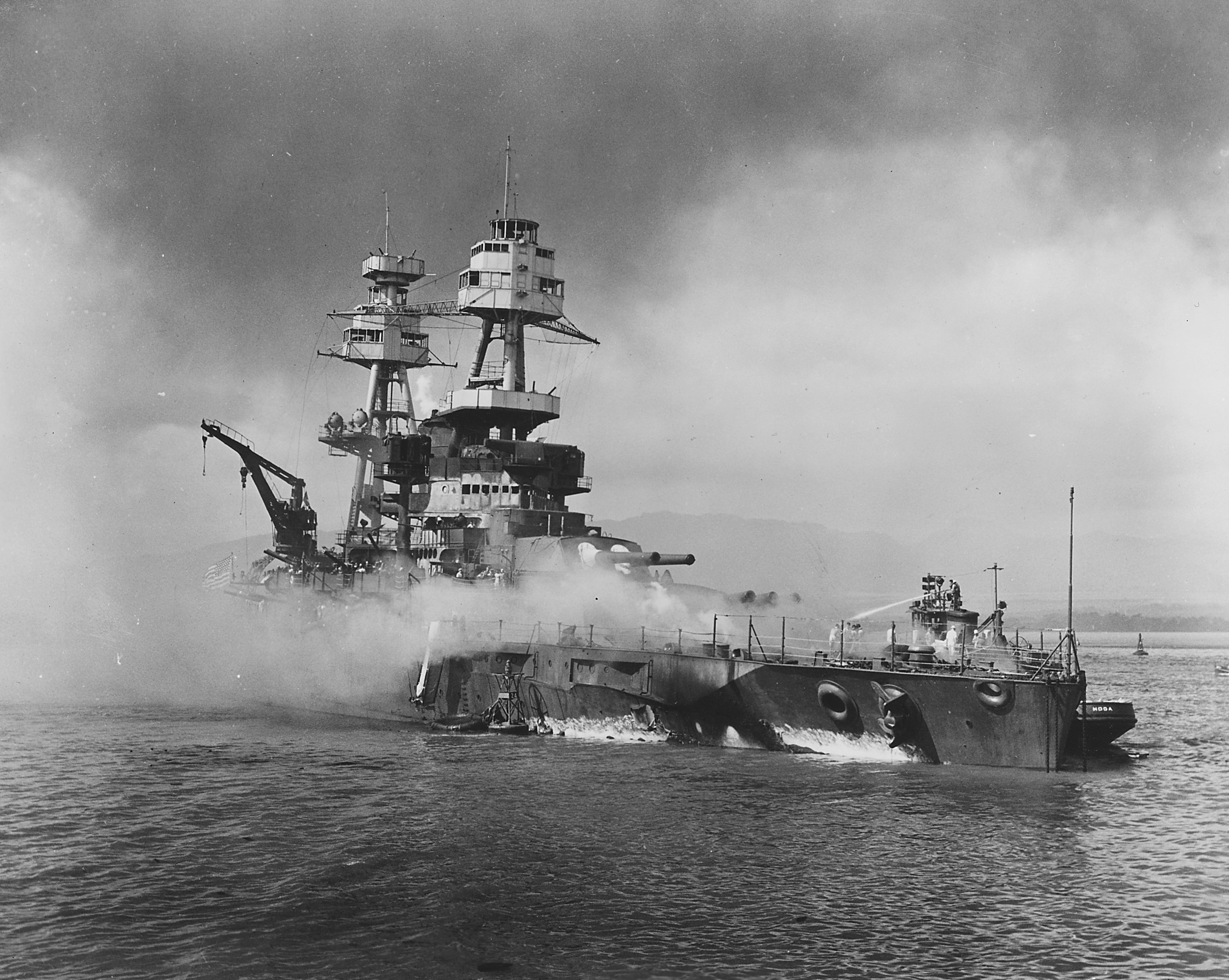
Nevada beached

As bomb damage became evident, Nevada was ordered to proceed to the west side of Ford Island to prevent her from sinking in deeper water. Instead, she was grounded off Waipio Point, with the help of Hoga and Avocet, though she managed to force down three more planes before she struck the shore. Gasoline fires prevented damage control parties from containing flooding forward of the main torpedo defense system. Flooding the main magazine and counterflooding to keep the ship stable lowered the bow allowing water to enter the ship at the second deck level. Lack of watertight subdivision between the second and main decks from frame 30 to frame 115 allowed water entering through bomb holes in the forecastle to flow aft through the ship's ventilation system to flood the dynamo and boiler rooms.

Over the course of the morning, Nevada suffered a total of 60 killed and 109 wounded. Two more men died aboard during salvage operations on 7 February 1942, when they were overcome by hydrogen sulfide gas from decomposing paper and meat. The ship suffered a minimum of six bomb hits and one torpedo hit, but "it is possible that as many as ten bomb hits may have been received, [...] as certain damaged areas [were] of sufficient size to indicate that they were struck by more than one bomb."

=== Attu ===
On 12 February 1942, now with Captain Harry L. Thompson (15 December 1941 – 25 August 1942) commanding, Nevada was refloated and underwent temporary repairs at Pearl Harbor so she could get to Puget Sound Navy Yard for major repairs and modernization. Then under command of Captain Howard F. Kingman (25 August 1942 – 25 January 1943), the overhaul was completed in October 1942, and it changed the old battleship's appearance so she slightly resembled a South Dakota from a distance.

Her 5"/51s and 5"/25s were replaced with sixteen 5"/38 caliber guns in new twin mounts. Nevada, with Captain Willard A. Kitts (25 January 1943 – 21 July 1943) commanding, then sailed for Alaska, where she provided fire support from 11 to 18 May 1943 for the capture of Attu. Nevada then departed for Norfolk Navy Yard in June for further modernization.

=== D-Day ===
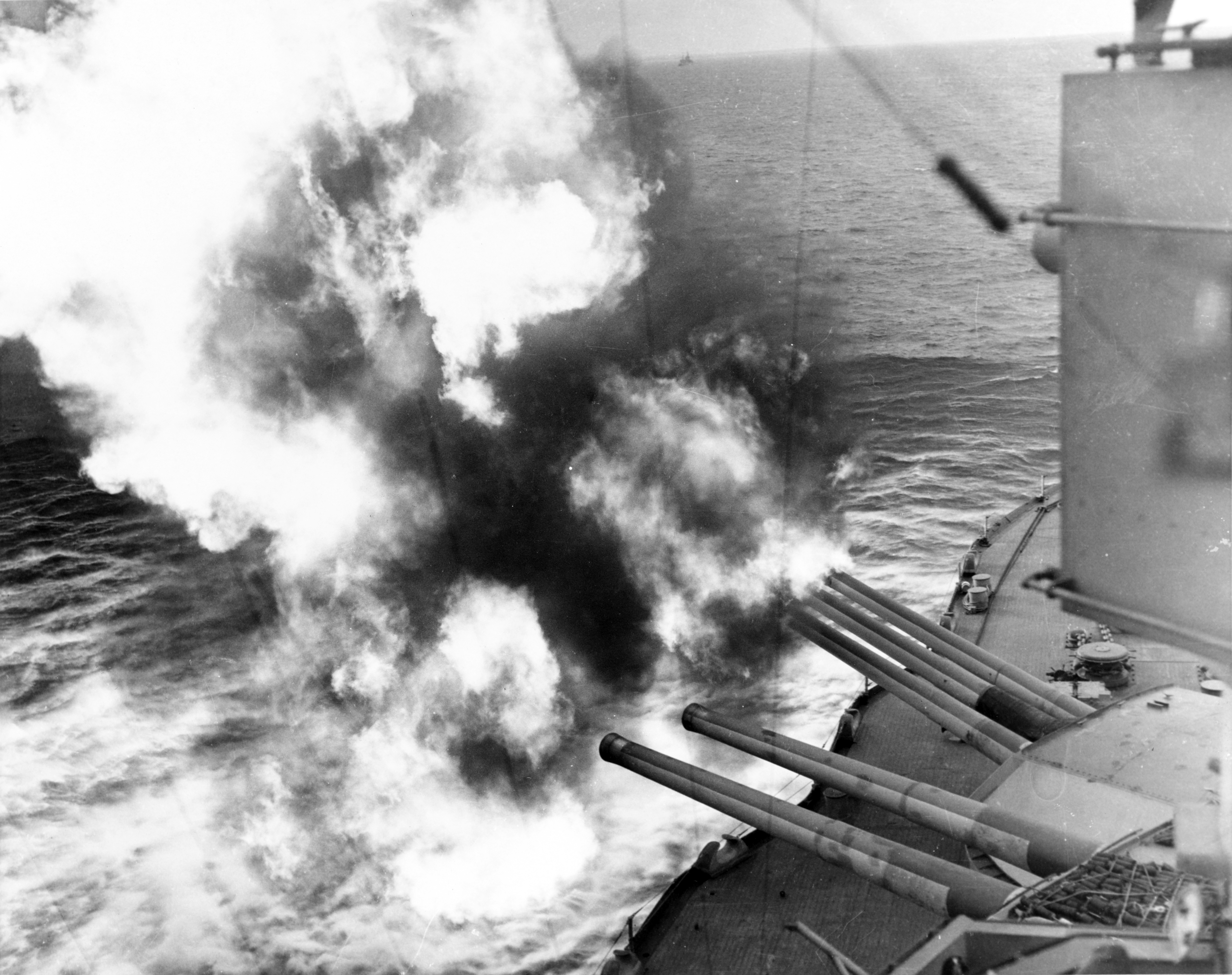
Forward 14/45 guns of Nevada fire on positions ashore, during the landings on "Utah" Beach, 6 June 1944

After completion, in mid-1943 Nevada went on Atlantic convoy duty. Old battleships such as Nevada were attached to many convoys across the Atlantic to guard against the chance that a German capital ship might head out to sea on a raiding mission.

After completing more convoy runs, Nevada set sail for the United Kingdom to prepare for the Normandy Invasion, arriving in April 1944, with Captain Powell M. Rhea (21 July 1943 – 4 October 1944) in command. Her float plane artillery observer pilots were temporarily assigned to VOS-7 flying Spitfires from RNAS Lee-on-Solent (HMS Daedalus).

She was chosen as Rear Admiral Morton Deyo's flagship for the operation. During the invasion, Nevada supported forces ashore from 6–17 June, and again on 25 June; during this time, she employed her guns against shore defenses on the Cherbourg Peninsula, "[seeming] to lean back as [she] hurled salvo after salvo at the shore batteries." Shells from her guns ranged as far as 17 nmi (20 mi; 31 km) inland in attempts to break up German concentrations and counterattacks, even though she was straddled by counterbattery fire 27 times (though never hit).

Nevada was later praised for her "incredibly accurate" fire in support of beleaguered troops, as some of the targets she hit were just 600 yd (550 m) from the front line. Nevada was the only battleship present at both Pearl Harbor and the Normandy landings.

=== Southern France ===
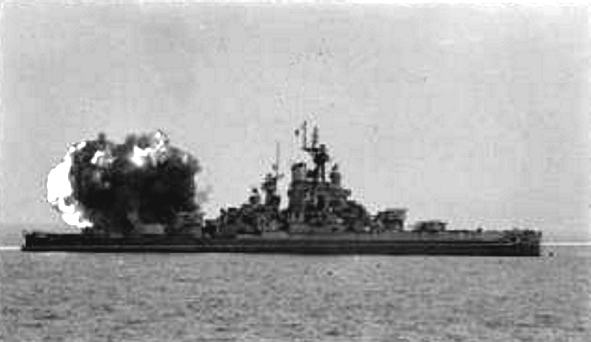
Nevada bombarding shore targets in Southern France during Operation Dragoon

After D-Day, the Allies headed to Toulon for another amphibious assault, codenamed Operation Dragoon. To support this, many ships were sent from the beaches of Normandy to the Mediterranean, including five battleships (the United States' Nevada, Texas, Arkansas, the British Ramillies, and the Free French Lorraine), three US heavy cruisers (Augusta, Tuscaloosa and Quincy), and many destroyers and landing craft were transferred south.

Nevada supported this operation from 15 August – 25 September 1944, "dueling" with "Big Willie": a heavily reinforced fortress with four 340 mm (13.4 in) guns in two twin turrets. These guns had been salvaged from the French battleship Provence after the scuttling of the French fleet in Toulon; the guns had a range of nearly 19 nautical miles (35 km) and they commanded every approach to the port of Toulon. In addition, they were fortified with heavy armor plate embedded into the rocky sides of the island of Saint Mandrier. Due to these dangers, the fire-support ships assigned to the operation were ordered to level the fortress. Beginning on 19 August, and continuing on subsequent days, one or more heavy warships bombarded it in conjunction with low-level bomber strikes. On the 23rd, a bombardment force headed by Nevada struck the "most damaging" blow to the fort during a 6½ hour battle, which saw 354 salvos fired by Nevada. Toulon fell on the 25th, but the fort, though it was "coming apart at the seams", held out for three more days.

Nevada then headed to New York to have her gun barrels relined. In addition, the three 14"/45 caliber guns (356 mm) of Turret 1 were replaced with Mark 8 guns formerly on Arizona and in the relining process at the time of Pearl Harbor; these new guns were relined to Mark 12 specifications.

=== Iwo Jima, Okinawa and Japan ===
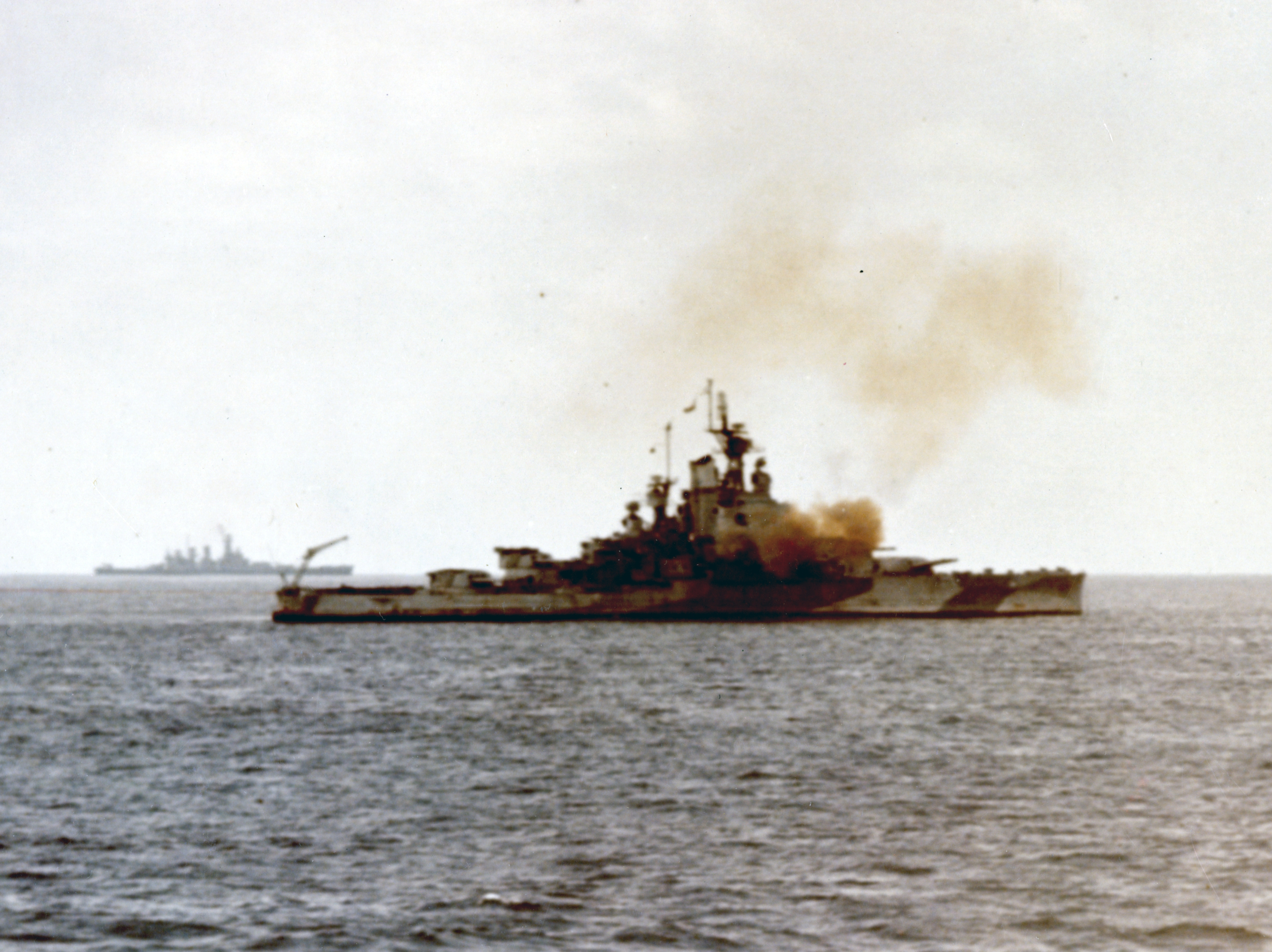
Nevada bombarding Iwo Jima, 19 February 1945

After re-fitting, and with Captain Homer L. Grosskopf (4 October 1944 – 28 October 1945) commanding, she sailed for the Pacific, arriving off Iwo Jima on 16 February 1945 to "[prepare] the island for invasion with heavy bombardment"; which she did through 7 March. During the invasion, she moved to be within 600 yd (550 m) from shore to provide maximum firepower for the troops that were advancing.

On 24 March 1945, Nevada joined Task Force 54 (TF 54), the "Fire Support Force", off Okinawa as bombardment began prior to the invasion of Okinawa. The ships of TF 54 then moved into position on the night of the 23rd, beginning their bombardment missions at dawn on the 24th. Along with the rest of the force, Nevada shelled Japanese airfields, shore defenses, supply dumps, and troop concentrations. However, after the fire support ships retired for the night, dawn "came up like thunder" when seven kamikazes attacked the force while it was without air cover. One plane, though hit repeatedly by antiaircraft fire from the force, crashed onto the main deck of Nevada, next to turret No. 3. It killed 11 and wounded 49; it also knocked out both 14 in (360 mm) guns in that turret and three 20 mm anti-aircraft weapons. Another two men were lost to fire from a shore battery on 5 April. Until 30 June, she was stationed off Okinawa; she then departed to join the 3rd Fleet from 10 July to 7 August, which allowed Nevada to come within range of the Japanese home islands during the closing days of the war, though she did not bombard them. (Note: Samuel Eliot Morison's Victory in the Pacific describes the three following battleship bombardments of Japan: South Dakota, Indiana, Massachusetts, two heavy cruisers and nine destroyers bombarded Kamaishi on 15 July 1945 (pp. 312–313), Iowa, Missouri, Wisconsin, two CLs and eight DDs bombarded Muroran on 16 July, (pp. 313–314) and on the night of 18 July, Iowa, Missouri, Wisconsin, North Carolina and Alabama and HMS King George V bombarded Hitachi (pp. 315–316). Richard B. Frank in Downfall. The End of the Imperial Japanese Empire lists all these bombardments on p. 157 and adds a bombardment of Hamamatsu on the night of 29–30 July, by South Dakota, Indiana and Massachusetts. Nevada is not mentioned anywhere as having bombarded any of the Home Islands. Citations: Morison 2002 and Frank 1999)

== Post-war ==
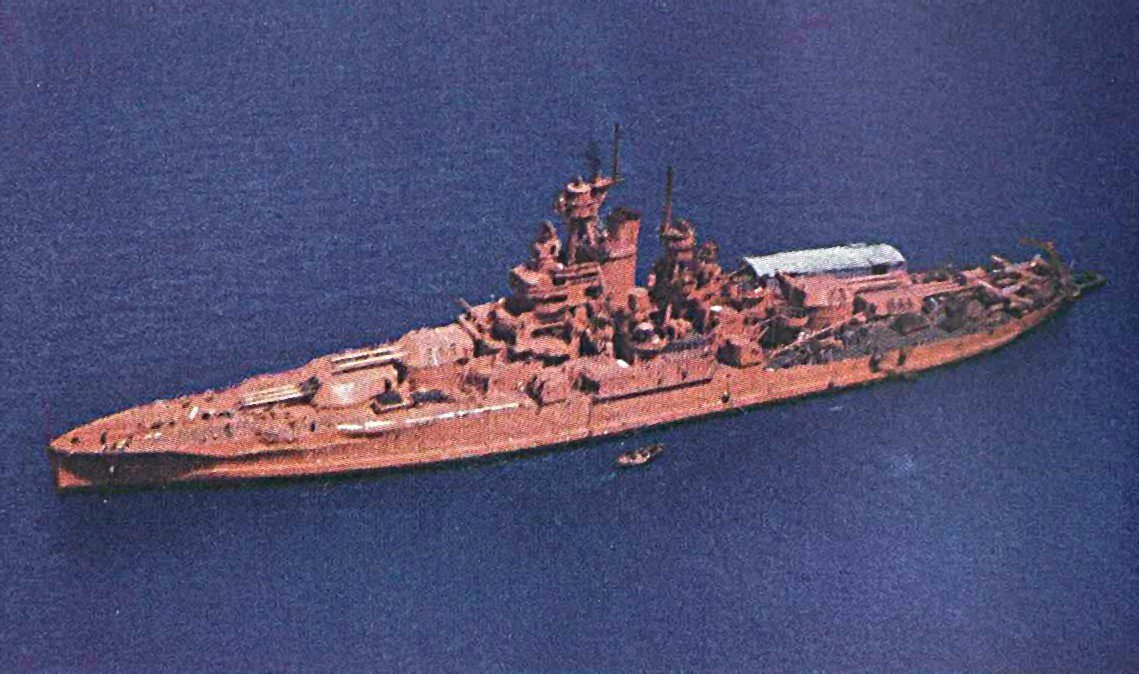
Battleship USS Nevada (BB-36) painted in orange as target ship for the Operation Crossroads Able Nuclear weapons test.

Nevada, then with her final commanding officer, Captain Cecil C. Adell (28 October 1945 – 1 July 1946), returned to Pearl Harbor after a brief stint of occupation duty in Tokyo Bay. Nevada was surveyed and, at 32 years old, was deemed too old to be kept in the post-war fleet. As a result, she was assigned to be a target ship in the first Bikini atomic experiments (Operation Crossroads) of July 1946. The experiment consisted of detonating two atomic bombs to test their effectiveness against ships. Nevada was the bombardier's target for the first test, codenamed 'Able', which used an air-dropped weapon. To help distinguish the target from surrounding vessels, Nevada was painted a reddish-orange. However, even with the high-visibility color scheme, the bomb fell about 710 yd (650 m) off-target, exploding above the attack transport Gilliam instead. Due in part to the miss, Nevada survived. The ship also remained afloat after the second test—'Baker', a detonation some 90 ft (27 m) below the surface of the water—but was damaged and extremely radioactive from the spray. Nevada was later towed to Pearl Harbor and decommissioned on 29 August 1946.

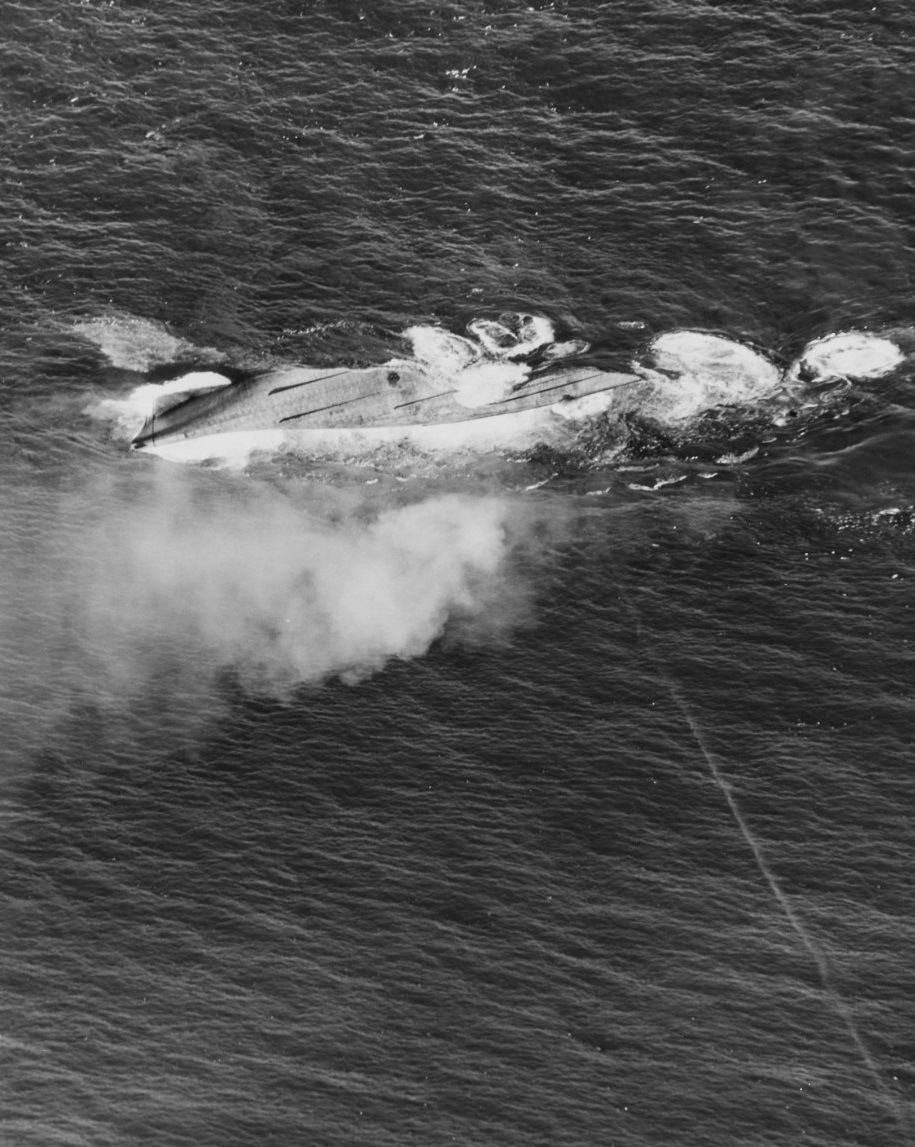
Nevada sinking as a target ship, 31 July 1948.

After she was thoroughly examined, Iowa and two other vessels used Nevada as a practice gunnery target 65 miles southwest of Pearl Harbor on 31 July 1948. (Note: The Naval Vessel Register entry for Nevada, only states that Iowa, a heavy cruiser and a destroyer used her as a gunnery target. No further details are known.) The ships did not sink Nevada, so she was given a coup de grâce with an aerial torpedo hit amidships.

=== Wreck ===
On 11 May 2020, it was announced that a joint expedition by Ocean Infinity, with its ship the Pacific Constructor, and the operations center of SEARCH Inc., headed by Dr. James Delgado had discovered Nevada's wreck. Nevada is located at a depth of 15,400 feet (4,700 m) off the coast of Hawaii and about 65 nautical miles southwest of Pearl Harbor. The wreck lies upside down, with the main hull carrying the scars of shell fire and torpedo hits. Nearby is a large debris field with the turrets, which fell off the ship as she capsized, and the bow and stern, both of which were torn free. Archaeologists also documented the two tripod masts, portions of the bridge, sections of deck and superstructure, and one of four tanks, an M26 Pershing, placed on the deck for the atomic bomb tests. The hull was still painted and the number "36" was visible on the stern.

One of the former Arizona guns mounted on Nevada is paired with a gun formerly on Missouri at the Wesley Bolin Memorial Plaza just east of the Arizona State Capitol complex in downtown Phoenix, Arizona. It is part of a memorial representing the start and end of the Pacific War for the United States.

A large model of the ship built for the 1970 film Tora! Tora! Tora! survives today in Los Angeles and often appears at local parades.

== Bibliography ==
=== Print sources ===
- Burton, Earl; Pincus, JH (September 2004). "The Other D-Day: The Invasion of Southern France". Sea Classics. 37 (9): 60–70. Archived from the original on 2 April 2015.
- Bonner, Kermit (1996). Final Voyages. Paducah, KY: Turner Publishing Company. ISBN 978-1-56311-289-8.
- Breyer, Siegfried (1973). Battleships and Battle Cruisers 1905–1970. Doubleday and Company. ISBN 978-0-385-07247-2.
- Campbell, John (1985). Naval Weapons of World War Two. Annapolis: Naval Institute Press. ISBN 978-0-87021-459-2.
- Chisholm, Hugh, ed. (1922). "Battleships". Encyclopædia Britannica. Vol. 32. London and New York: The Encyclopædia Britannica, Company Ltd.
- Cox, Ormund L. (1916). "U.S.S. Nevada; Description and Trials". Journal of the American Society of Naval Engineers. 28: 20–54. doi:10.1111/j.1559-3584.1916.tb00598.x.
- Fitzsimons, Bernard, ed. (1978). "Nevada". Illustrated Encyclopedia of 20th Century Weapons and Warfare. Vol. 18. London: Phoebus. p. 1982.
- Frank, Richard B. (1999). Downfall; The End of the Imperial Japanese Empire. New York: Penguin Books. ISBN 978-0-14-100146-3.
- Friedman, Norman (1978). Battleship Design and Development 1905–1945. Conway Maritime Press. ISBN 978-0-85177-135-9.
- Friedman, Norman (1985). U.S. Battleships: An Illustrated Design History. Annapolis: Naval Institute Press. ISBN 978-0-87021-715-9. OCLC 12214729.
- Gardiner, Robert; Gray, Randal, eds. (1985). Conway's All the World's Fighting Ships 1906–1921. Annapolis: Naval Institute Press. ISBN 978-0-87021-907-8. OCLC 12119866.
- Gardiner, Robert; Chesneau, Roger, eds. (1980). Conway's All the World's Fighting Ships 1922–1946. New York: Mayflower Books. ISBN 978-0-8317-0303-5.
- Halpern, Paul G. (1995). A Naval History of World War I. Annapolis: Naval Institute Press. ISBN 978-1-55750-352-7.
- Hone, T.; Friedman, N. (April 1981). "Innovation and Administration in the Navy Department: The Case of the Nevada Design". Military Affairs. 45 (2): 57–62. doi:10.2307/1986962. JSTOR 1986962.
- Karig, Walter; Burton, Earl; Freeland, Stephen L. (1946). Battle Report (Volume 2); The Atlantic War. New York/Toronto: Farrar and Rinehart, Inc.
- Lord, Walter (2001). Day of Infamy. Macmillan. ISBN 978-0-8050-6803-0.
- Russell, James Clayton; Moore, William Emmet (1921). The United States Navy in the World War. Pictorial Bureau.
- Miller, Edward S. (1991). War Plan Orange: The U.S. Strategy to Defeat Japan, 1897–1945. Annapolis, MD: United States Naval Institute Press. ISBN 978-0-87021-759-3.
- Miller, Nathan (1997). U.S. Navy: A History. Annapolis, MD: United States Naval Institute Press. ISBN 978-1-55750-595-8.
- Morison, Samuel Eliot (2001). "Nevada". History of United States Naval Operations in World War II. History of United States Naval Operations in World War II (series). Champaign: University of Illinois Press. ISBN 978-0-252-07065-5.
- Morison, Samuel Eliot (1963). The Two-Ocean War; A Short History of the United States Navy in the Second World War. Boston: Little, Brown and Company.
- Morison, Samuel Eliot (1948). The Rising Sun in the Pacific; 1931 – April 1942. History of United States Naval Operations in World War II (series). Boston: Little, Brown and Company. OCLC 7361008.
- Morison, Samuel Eliot (1956). Volume X, The Atlantic Battle Won. Boston: Little, Brown and Company.
- Morison, Samuel Eliot (2002). Victory in the Pacific (reprint ed.). Urbana: University of Illinois Press. History of United States Naval Operations in World War II. ISBN 978-0-252-07065-5.
- Morison, Samuel Loring; Polmar, Norman (2003). The American Battleship. Zenith Imprint. ISBN 978-0-7603-0989-6.
- Prange, Gordon W.; Goldstein, Donald M.; Dillon, Katherine V. (1988). December 7, 1941: The Day the Japanese Attacked Pearl Harbor. New York: McGraw-Hill Book Company. ISBN 978-0-07-050682-4.
- Prange, Gordon W.; Goldstein, Donald M.; Dillon, Katherine V. (1991). At Dawn We Slept. New York: Penguin Books. ISBN 978-0-14-015734-5.
- Ryan, Cornelius (1959). The Longest Day; June 6, 1944. New York: Simon and Schuster. 671-20814-1.
- US Naval History Division (1970). The Battleship in the United States Navy. Washington D.C.: Naval History Division. OCLC 298306. 72-604171.
- Venzon, Anne Cipriano; Miles, Paul L. (1999). The United States in the First World War: An Encyclopedia. Taylor & Francis. ISBN 978-0-8153-3353-1.
- Wallin, Homer N. (1968). Pearl Harbor: Why, How, Fleet Salvage and Final Appraisal. Washington, D.C.: Department of the Navy. ISBN 978-0-89875-565-7. OCLC 51673398.
- Worth, Richard (2002). Fleets of World War II. Da Capo Press. ISBN 978-0-306-81116-6.
- Zimm, Alan D. (2011), Attack on Pearl Harbor: Strategy, Combat, Myths, Deceptions, Havertown, Pennsylvania: Casemate Publishers, ISBN 978-1-61200-010-7

=== Online sources ===
- "Nevada". Dictionary of American Naval Fighting Ships. Navy Department, Naval History and Heritage Command.
- "Delaware". Dictionary of American Naval Fighting Ships. Navy Department, Naval History & Heritage Command.
- "Florida". Dictionary of American Naval Fighting Ships. Navy Department, Naval History & Heritage Command.
- "Wyoming". Dictionary of American Naval Fighting Ships. Navy Department, Naval History & Heritage Command.
- "New York". Dictionary of American Naval Fighting Ships. Navy Department, Naval History & Heritage Command.
- "Texas". Dictionary of American Naval Fighting Ships. Navy Department, Naval History & Heritage Command.
- "Utah". Dictionary of American Naval Fighting Ships. Navy Department, Naval History & Heritage Command.
- "California". Dictionary of American Naval Fighting Ships. Navy Department, Naval History & Heritage Command.
- "USS Nevada (BB 36)". Naval Vessel Register.
- "Nevada Class (BB-36 and BB-37), 1912 Building Program". Naval Historical Center. US Navy Department. Archived from the original on 5 August 2011.
- "USS Nevada (Battleship # 36, later BB-36), 1916–1948". Naval Historical Center. US Navy Department. 2007. Archived from the original on 16 April 2003.
- Scanland, F.W. (1941). "USS Nevada, Report of Pearl Harbor Attack". Naval Historical Center. US Navy Department. Archived from the original on 8 June 2015.
- "USS Nevada during the Pearl Harbor Attack (Part II)". Naval History & Heritage Command. US Navy Department. 20 December 2000. Archived from the original on 8 January 2012.
- "Operation Crossroads: Bikini Atoll". Naval Historical Center. US Navy Department. 2001. Archived from the original on 21 May 2000.
- "CINCPOA Communique No. 264, 19 February 1945". HyperWar. 1945.
- DiGiulian, Tony (27 March 2008). "United States of America 14"/45 (35.6 cm) Marks 8, 9, 10 and 12". NavWeaps.com.
- Pike, John. "BB-36 Nevada Class". GlobalSecurity.org.
- Pike, John. "SSBN 733 Nevada". GlobalSecurity.org.

=== The New York Times ===
- "Launch New Dreadnought; Named the Nevada – Plans announced for Two Still Greater Ships" (PDF). The New York Times. 12 July 1914. p. C5.
- "The Nevada Leaves Quincy" (PDF). The New York Times. 23 October 1915. p. 5.
- "Sea Fighter Nevada Ready For Her Test" (PDF). The New York Times. 16 October 1915. p. 12.
- "Mightiest U.S. Ship Coming" (PDF). The New York Times. 19 September 1915. p. 9.
- "Warships Near Completion; The Nevada and the Oklahoma almost Three-fourths built" (PDF). The New York Times. 5 November 1915. p. 8.
- "Nevada Test a Success" (PDF). The New York Times. 5 November 1915. p. 14.
- "The Nevada Out Again" (PDF). The New York Times. 7 November 1915. p. 6.
- "Nevada saves fuel" (PDF). The New York Times. 10 November 1915. p. 8.
- "Nevada Meets Tests; New Superdreadnought easily fills contract requirements" (PDF). The New York Times. 8 November 1915. p. 6.
- "The Nevada in Commission" (PDF). The New York Times. 19 September 1915. p. 12.
- "Ovation to Sea Fighters; Harbor Echoes With Greetings as Our Ships Steam In" (PDF). The New York Times. 27 December 1918. p. 1 and 4.
- "Pichon to Welcome Wilson; Will Head Delegation Aboard Warships to Meet Him Off Brest" (PDF). The New York Times. 11 December 1918. p. 1.
- "Battleship Fleet sails for New York; Ten Dreadnoughts Homebound from Brest to Join in Christmas Celebration" (PDF). The New York Times. 15 December 1918. p. 15.
- "War Radio Service For Hughes on Trip" (PDF). The New York Times. 23 August 1922. p. 30.
- "Hughes Arrives at Rio" (PDF). The New York Times. 6 September 1922. p. 14.
- "Baseball in Rio a Regular Sport" (PDF). The New York Times. 31 December 1922. p. 83.
