= Robert Vesco =

American fraudster

Robert L. Vesco
- Born: December 4, 1935; Detroit, Michigan, U.S.
- Died: November 23, 2007 (aged 71); Havana, Cuba
- Occupation: Financier
- Spouse: Lidia Alfonso Llauger
- Status: Deceased
- Criminal charges: Fraud, conspiracy, drug smuggling
- Penalty: 13 years

Robert Lee Vesco (December 4, 1935 – November 23, 2007) was an American criminal financier. After several years of risky investments and dubious credit dealings, Vesco was alleged to have committed securities fraud. He immediately fled the ensuing U.S. Securities and Exchange Commission investigation by living in a number of Central American and Caribbean countries.

Vesco was notorious throughout his life, attempting to buy a Caribbean island from Antigua to create an autonomous country and having a national law in Costa Rica made to protect him from extradition.

Although, during the time Vesco was residing in Costa Rica, Time Magazine published an article about how the Costa Rican government refused to extradite Robert Vesco to the United States to face securities fraud charges. In 2025, the Costa Rican press published their government’s view that, despite Time Magazine’s reporting, it was clear the U.S. didn’t want to extradite Robert Vesco.

A 2001 Slate.com article termed Vesco "the undisputed king of the fugitive financiers." After settling in Cuba during 1982, Vesco was charged with drug smuggling in 1989. During the 1990s he was indicted by the Cuban government for "fraud and illicit economic activity" and "acts prejudicial to the economic plans and contracts of the state" in 1996.

Vesco was sentenced to 13 years in jail by Cuba. In November 2007 The New York Times reported that he had died of lung cancer at a hospital in Havana, Cuba, five months before, although it has been suggested that he faked his death.

== Biography ==
Vesco was the son of a Detroit autoworker. He was born in Detroit, Michigan, where he grew up and attended, and then quit, Cass Technical High School. He quit engineering school during his early twenties to work for an investment company. With an $800 stake, Vesco began matching buyers and sellers in the aluminum market until he eventually acquired a portion of the profits of a floundering aluminum plant. By 1965, he could borrow enough money to acquire International Controls Corporation (ICC). Through aggressively hostile expansions and debt-financed takeovers of other businesses he increased ICC quickly. By 1968 the company owned an airline and several manufacturing plants, and Vesco had shares totaling US$50 million.

=== IOS scandal ===
In 1970, Vesco began a successful takeover bid for Investors Overseas Service, Ltd., a mutual fund investment company with holdings of $1.5 billion managed by financier Bernard Cornfeld, who were in trouble with the SEC. When his company began to experience financial difficulty, no "white knight" was willing to get involved. Vesco saw his chance and began a protracted battle to assume control of the company, opposed by Cornfeld and others. Cornfeld was jailed in Switzerland and Vesco was accused of looting the company of hundreds of millions of dollars. Many prominent figures in global business, finance, and royalty were associated with the mess, receiving money from one party or the other for their endorsement. Among the accusations against Vesco were that he parked funds belonging to IOS investors in a series of dummy corporations, one of which had an Amsterdam address that was later associated with Prince Bernhard of the Netherlands, and that he broke into a Swiss bank vault to obtain shares. These allegations are unproven, as Vesco fled the country and spent the next fifteen years relocating between countries that lacked extradition treaties with the United States.

During February 1973, with criminal charges against him imminent, Vesco used the corporate jet to flee to Costa Rica along with about $200 million worth of IOS's investments, according to SEC allegations. Vesco would continue to wage a legal battle from Costa Rica and the Bahamas to try to maintain control of his 26 percent of ICC stock, but, with five outstanding indictments for securities fraud against him, he could not return to the United States. It was not until 1981 that ICC had become completely free of Vesco's control, after paying almost $12 million to him and his family.

=== Nixon scandal ===
Among the charges that emerged during the 1970s, the SEC accused Vesco of embezzling $220 million from four different IOS funds. During 1973, Vesco fled to Costa Rica. Shortly before his departure, hoping to end the SEC investigation into his activities, Vesco routed substantial contributions to Richard Nixon through Nixon's nephew Donald A. Nixon.

Vesco was also investigated for a secret $200,000 contribution made to the 1972 campaign to re-elect Nixon. As counsel to International Controls Corporation, New Jersey lawyer Harry L. Sears delivered the contribution to Maurice Stans, finance chairman for the Committee to Re-elect the President. Vesco had wanted Attorney General John N. Mitchell to intercede on his behalf with SEC chairman William J. Casey. While Vesco fled the country, Stans, Mitchell, and Sears were indicted for obstruction of justice, though charges against all three were dismissed.

=== "Vesco law" ===
In Costa Rica, Vesco donated $2.1 million to Sociedad Agricola Industrial San Cristobal, S.A., a company initiated by President José Figueres. Figueres passed a law to guarantee that Vesco would not be extradited. Figueres' constitutional term ended during 1974. Vesco remained in Costa Rica until 1978, when President Rodrigo Carazo (1978–1982) repealed what was popularly referred to as the "Vesco Law."

During 1978 Vesco relocated first to Nassau and then to Antigua. While in Antigua Vesco tried unsuccessfully to buy the sister island Barbuda and establish it as a sovereign state. The Costa Rican government refused his attempt to return during 1978, while Rodrigo Carazo was President. During 1982 Vesco tried again to return to Costa Rica, but President Luis A. Monge denied his entry.

He lived in Nicaragua for a while, while the Sandinista government was in power. Each of these countries accepted him, hoping that his great wealth would finance local development projects. However, this worked badly for everybody involved, although Vesco was reputed to have stolen more than $200 million, and appeared several times on the Forbes list of the wealthiest people in the world.

=== Nixon scandal, Pt. II ===
During 1982 he relocated to Cuba, a country that could provide him with treatment for his painful urinary tract infections and would not extradite him to the U.S. Cuban authorities accepted him on the condition that he not become involved in any financial deals. He married Lidia Alfonso Llauger.

Vesco was indicted during 1989 on drug smuggling charges.

During the 1990s, Vesco became involved once again with Donald Nixon after Nixon went to Cuba seeking to partner with the government in conducting clinical trials on a substance called trixolan or TX, which he claimed boosted the immune system. Vesco introduced Nixon to Fidel Castro and his brother, Raúl Castro, and the Cuban government agreed to provide laboratory facilities and doctors to conduct the trials. Results from the studies were claimed to be positive. In Cuba, Vesco joined forces with rogue former CIA operative Frank Terpil, and they offered their network of contacts to the Cuban government.

On or about May 31, 1995, Vesco attempted to defraud Nixon and Raúl Castro, and Cuban authorities seized control of the project and arrested Vesco, his wife, and Terpil.

At the time of Vesco's arrest the Cuban Foreign Ministry said he had been taken into custody "under suspicion of being a provocateur and an agent of foreign special services," or intelligence agencies. However, he was formally charged with "fraud and illicit economic activity" and "acts prejudicial to the economic plans and contracts of the state." During 1996 the Cuban government sentenced Vesco to 13 years in prison on charges resulting from the scandal. He was scheduled for release during 2009, when he would have been 74 years old. Vesco's wife Lidia was convicted on lesser charges and was released during 2005.

== Reported death ==
Vesco reportedly died of lung cancer in November 2007 and was buried at Colon Cemetery in Havana. However, reports of his death have been disputed as his associate Frank Terpil said that he had fled to Sierra Leone.

== In popular culture ==
In the penultimate episode of the sitcom Barney Miller, a “professor” is brought in for questioning related to his classes, which include “Robert Vesco: Man or Myth.” “It’s an elective,” he said.

A fictionalized version of Vesco is featured prominently in a sixth season episode of The Blacklist, titled "Robert Vesco (No. 9)", in which he is portrayed by actor Stacy Keach. The fictionalized Vesco is shown to have faked his own death in Cuba in 2007 and to be in pursuit of a legendary shipwreck from the Spanish treasure fleet.

Another fictionalized version of Vesco was featured in the 1980 movie The Return of Frank Cannon. Intended as a possible reboot pilot for the canceled detective series Cannon, the TV film featured the ex private eye enjoying sedate retirement as a gourmet restaurateur and fishing charter boat captain until he is lured by a still fetching old flame back into hefty gumshoe action to solve the murder of her husband, a retired CIA agent turned country horse breeder. Cannon winds up chasing down an expat financier similar to Vesco (played by Arthur Hill) along a still warm trail from Costa Rica back to the US after he finds out the murder victim had stumbled on a plot among other retired CIA agents to smuggle the fugitive back into the US following plastic surgery, where he had assumed a new identity as the dead man's inconspicuous neighborly horse vet.
