= Silsby Spalding =

American politician

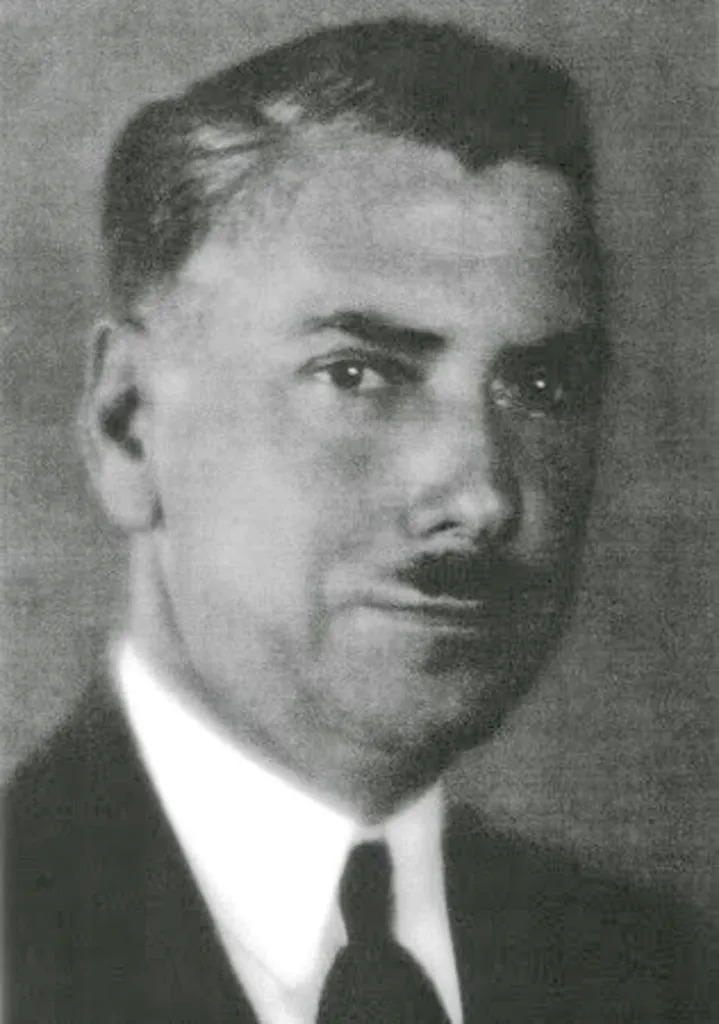
- Spalding in the 1920s
- Born: May 29, 1886; Minneapolis, Minnesota, USA
- Died: May 5, 1949 (aged 62); Beverly Hills, California
- Education: Pomona College Preparatory School; Stanford University
- Occupations: Businessman, politician
- Spouse: Caroline Canfield
- Children: Deborah C. Spalding
- Parent(s): Salathiel Martin Spalding; Sarah Eglantine Camp
- Relatives: Charles A. Canfield (father-in-law)

Silsby Spalding (May 29, 1886 – May 5, 1949) was an American businessman and politician. He served as the first mayor of Beverly Hills, California, from 1926 to 1928.

== Early life ==
Silsby Morse Spalding was born on May 29, 1886, in Minneapolis, Minnesota. His father was Salathiel Martin Spalding and his mother, Sarah Eglantine Camp. He studied at the Pomona College Preparatory School in Claremont, California, and later at Stanford University.

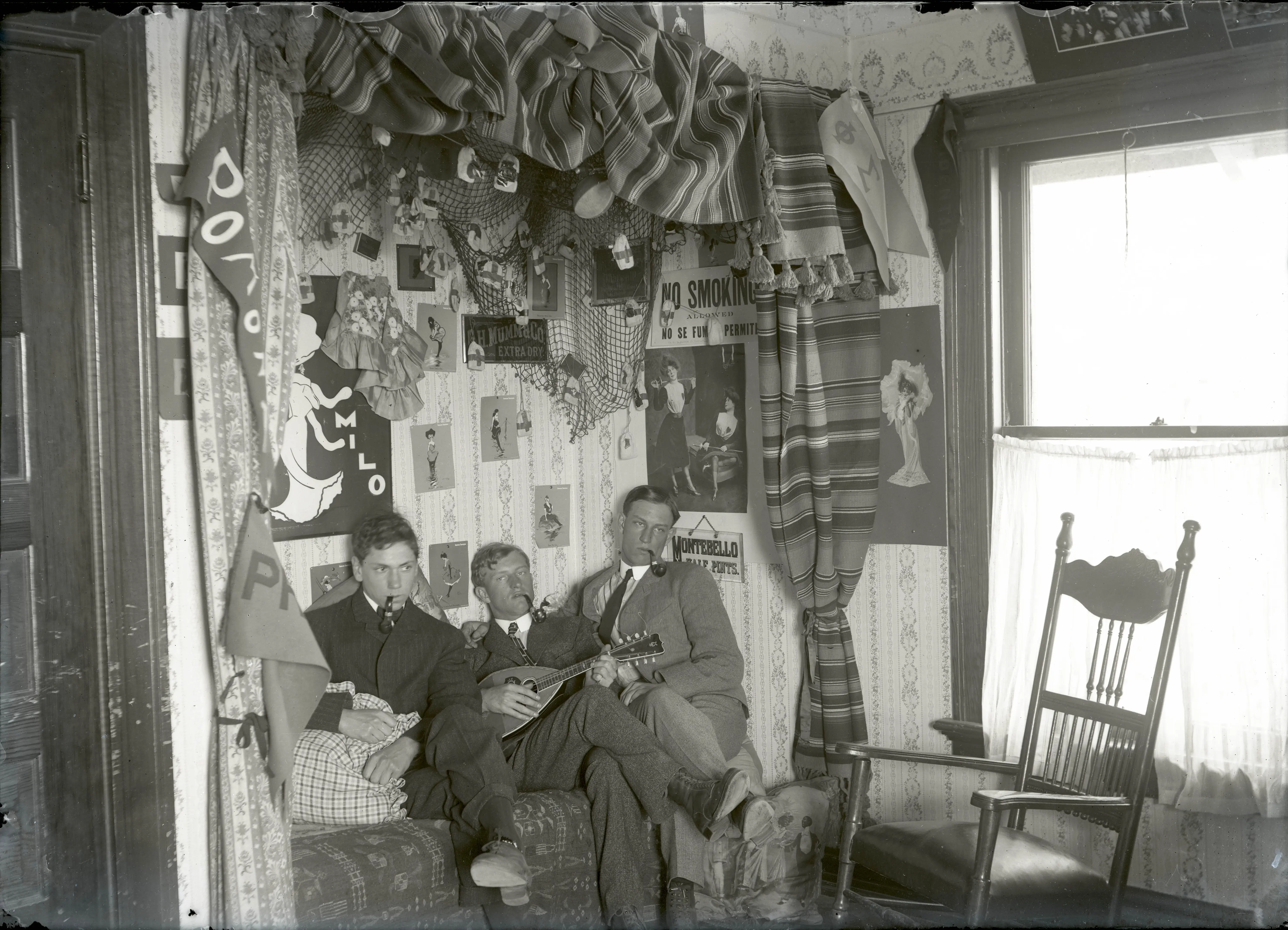
Silsby Spalding (right). The interior of Morris Cadwalder's room with three students smoking pipes.

== Career ==
Spalding was a sporting goods magnate. He also served as one of the earliest Presidents of the Aero Club of Southern California, and was an executive at the Mexican Eagle Petroleum Company and the Pan-American Petroleum and Transport Co.

Spalding served as the first Mayor of Beverly Hills, California from 1926 to 1928. During his tenure, he appointed Will Rogers as honorary mayor, garnering worldwide publicity for Beverly Hills.

== Personal life ==
Spalding married Caroline Canfield (1890-1970), daughter of oilman Charles A. Canfield (1848-1913) in 1911. They had a daughter, Deborah C. Spalding (1921-2011).

In 1912, after Canfield's death, they moved into Grayhall, an estate located at 1100 Carolyn Way, formerly built by Carole Lombard's father as a hunting lodge and later owned by George Hamilton and Bernard Cornfeld. From 1918 to 1921, they lived in the Frank Flint Estate, a Colonial Revival-style mansion resembling a Southern plantation located at 1006 North Crescent Drive. He later purchased the Tecolote Ranch in Goleta, California, where he raised purebred cattle and horses, and grew walnut and citrus trees.

== Death and legacy ==
Spalding died on May 5, 1949, at his main residence at 1019 Laurel Way in Beverly Hills, California.

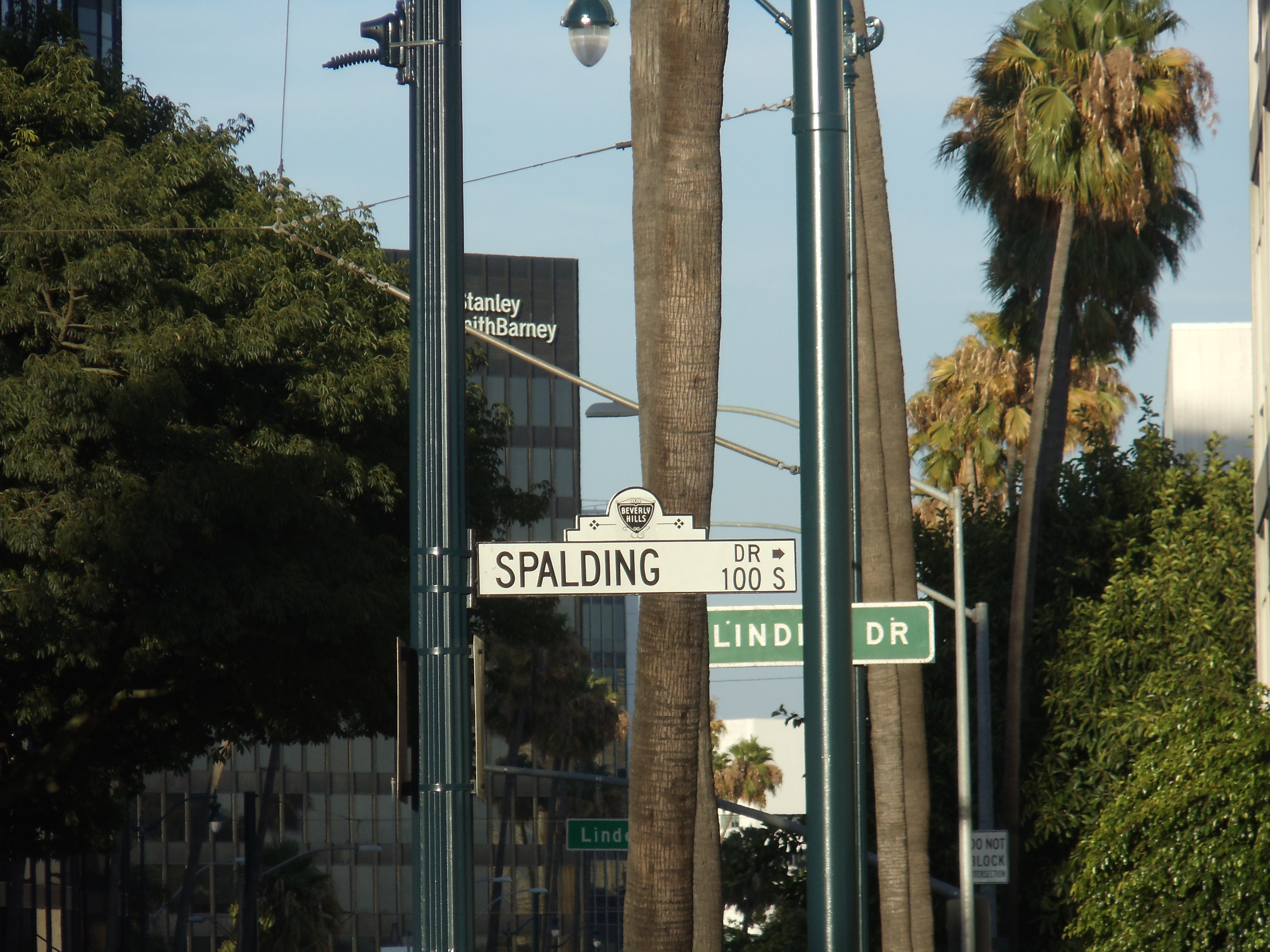
Street sign of Spalding Dr on Wilshire Boulevard in Beverly Hills, California.

Spalding Drive in Beverly Hills is named in his honor.

Political offices
| Preceded by Pierce E. Benedict | Mayor of Beverly Hills, California; 1926-1928 | Succeeded by Paul E. Schwab |
