= International Controls Corporation =

International Controls Corporation (ICC) was an American holding company incorporated in 1965. Before being taken private in 1997, its subsidiaries included Checker Motors Corporation and Great Dane Trailers. It had previously been forced to liquidate many of its holdings after charges of massive securities fraud against the company's founder, fugitive financier Robert Vesco.

== Early history ==
ICC was incorporated in 1965 by Robert Vesco (1935–2007), an entrepreneur from Detroit, Michigan. Vesco had secured control of Captive Seal, a valve manufacturer in Fairfield, New Jersey, and placed its assets and liabilities into the newly formed company. He then acquired Cryogenics Inc., a nearly defunct Florida-based manufacturer of cryogenic devices founded in 1959. Vesco merged ICC with Cryogenics and reorganized ICC as a public corporation in Florida, thus skirting SEC filing requirements.

Vesco initiated an aggressive expansion of ICC, borrowing heavily to acquire new holdings via hostile takeovers. By the end of 1967, ICC owned Fairfield Aviation (which operated Caldwell-Wright Airport, later renamed Essex County Airport), ICC Manufacturing (formerly Lowden Machine Co.), The Special Corporation (a precision manufacturer of electronic components), Silber Products, and the Moeller Tool Corporation.

ICC's stock was listed on the American Stock Exchange in May 1968. Later that year, it acquired the Intercontinental Manufacturing Company, a weapons manufacturer in Garland, Texas, and made a tender offer for the Electronic Specialty Company, a large manufacturer of aeronautical and electromechanical components. After a series of lawsuits, the acquisition of Electronic Specialty was completed in July 1969.

== SEC investigation ==
In 1970, Vesco began a takeover bid for Investors Overseas Service (IOS), a mutual fund investment firm run by Bernard Cornfield. According to later federal investigations, Vesco transferred money from IOS's mutual funds into various ICC-controlled offshore enterprises. The Securities and Exchange Commission (SEC) launched an inquiry into Vesco's dealings in March 1971. Vesco wanted Richard Nixon's Attorney General John N. Mitchell to intercede on his behalf with SEC chairman William J. Casey, and in April 1972 he sent his counsel, former New Jersey State Senator Harry L. Sears, along with ICC president Lawrence Richardson, to deliver a cash contribution of $200,000 to Maurice Stans, finance chairman for the Committee to Re-elect the President. The secret payment, made shortly after the enactment of financial disclosure laws under the Federal Election Campaign Act, was revealed in a pretrial deposition in February 1973.

With criminal charges pending from the SEC investigation, Vesco fled to Costa Rica in February 1973, accused of stealing $224 million from IOS investments. He sought to maintain control over his 26 percent share of the company, but facing multiple indictments for securities fraud, he never returned to the United States, dying in Havana, Cuba in 2007.

== Later history ==
In the wake of Vesco's flight, ICC was left in massive debt and facing several lawsuits. The company was placed under court supervision and was suspended from trading stock. In April 1973, the court-appointed board of directors selected Allen M. Shinn, a recently retired United States Navy vice admiral, as president and chief executive officer, with Elmer A. Sticco named chief operating officer.

To reduce its debt, the company sold off many of its subsidiaries, leaving behind Datron Systems and American Industries among its major holdings. Financier Arthur M. Goldberg launched a takeover bid in 1985, forming a corporation with Bear Stearns to acquire the company. Under Goldberg, ICC acquired the trucking firm Transway International Corp. A company bought in the acquisition, Great Dane Trailers Inc., became ICC's sole remaining subsidiary after further holdings were sold off in 1988.

In 1989, Goldberg engineered the reverse takeover of Checker Motors Corporation of Kalamazoo, Michigan, leaving ICC in control of two subsidiaries, Checker Motors and Great Dane Trailers. Later that year, ICC bought South Charleston Stamping and Manufacturing Co. of Charleston, West Virginia. The stamping plant was sold off in 1996. In 1997, ICC was privatized by Capital Resource Advisors, a Chicago investment firm, leaving Checker Motors Company as a stand-alone private company. Checker Motors declared bankruptcy in 2009.

ICC was renamed Great Dane Holdings Inc. in 1996. All company assets were acquired by CRA Holdings Inc. in 1997.
