= Henrik Kauffmann =

Danish diplomat and politician (1888–1963)

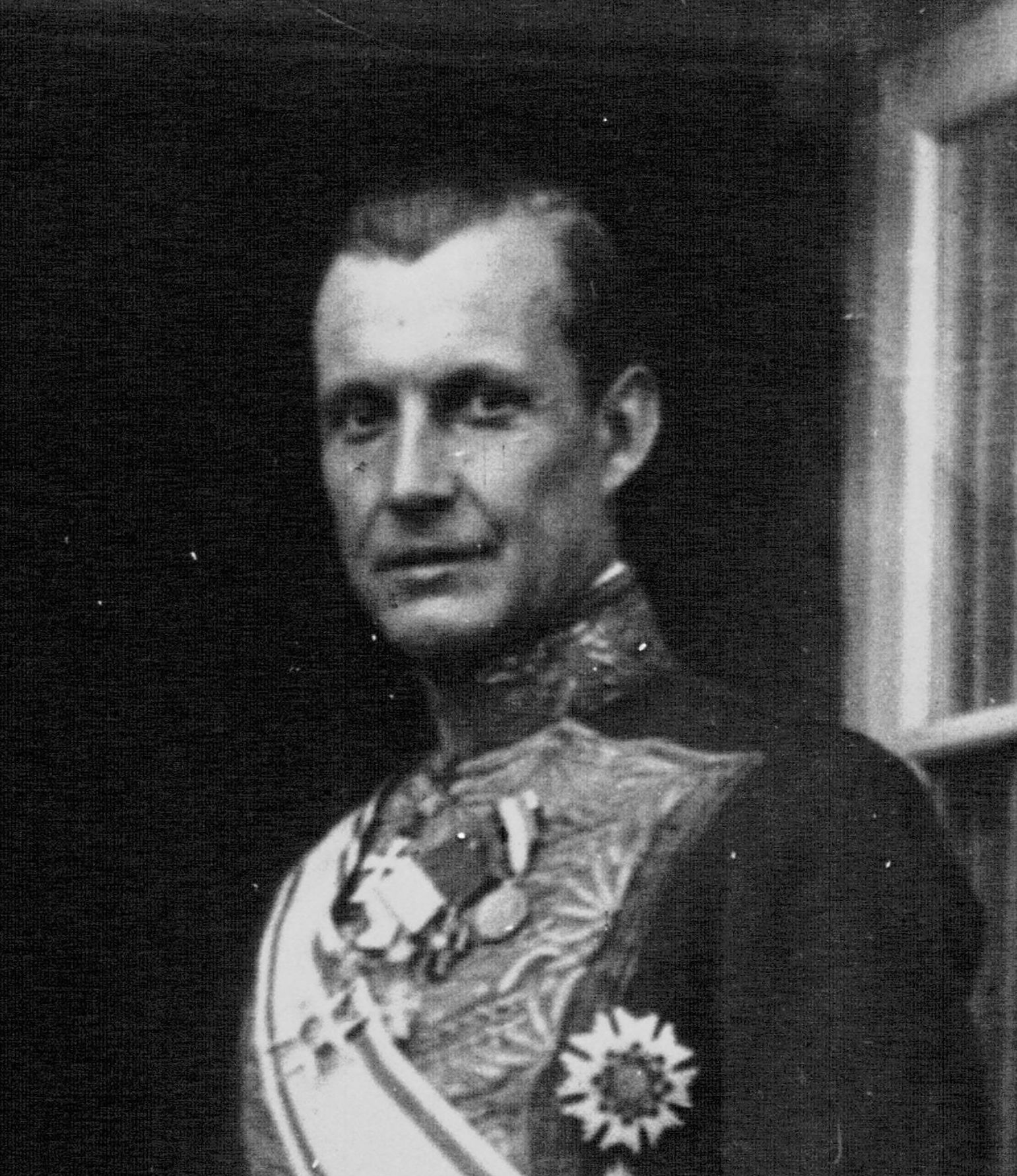
- Kauffmann in 1932

Danish Ambassador to the United States
- In office 22 August 1939 – 1958
- President: Franklin D. Roosevelt; Harry S. Truman; Dwight D. Eisenhower
- Preceded by: Otto Wadsted
- Succeeded by: Kjeld Gustav Knuth-Winterfeldt

Minister without portfolio
- In office 12 May 1945 – 7 November 1945
- Prime Minister: Vilhelm Buhl

Personal details
- Born: Henrik Louis Hans von Kauffmann; 26 August 1888 Frankfurt am Main
- Died: 5 June 1963 (aged 74) Skodsborg Spa Hotel
- Spouse: Charlotte MacDougall (m. 1926; died 1963)
- Children: 2
- Relatives: Mason Sears (brother-in-law)

Henrik Kauffmann explaining the agreement with the US over Greenland

Henrik Kauffmann (26 August 1888 – 5 June 1963) was a Danish diplomat who served as ambassador to the United States during World War II and unilaterally concluded an agreement granting the United States extensive military rights in Greenland.

== Career ==
Kauffmann started his foreign career by serving as envoy in Rome, 1921–1923. He afterwards served in Peking in 1924–1932 when he was succeeded by Oscar O'Neill Oxholm. During this period Kauffmann became notable for three things: political reports of high quality; an ability to gain close contacts with central Chinese decision makers; and his lavish spending. After his time in Peking, Kauffmann served as envoy in Oslo 1932–1939 (when he was, again, succeeded by Oxholm), where he helped soften the Danish-Norwegian relations following the Greenland case.

Kauffman was then posted to Washington, DC, in the summer of 1939. On the day after Denmark was occupied by Germany on 9 April 1940, Kauffmann became the first Danish envoy to declare he could not receive and act on orders from an occupied Danish government, but the US still recognized him as Denmark's official representative.

On 9 April 1941, the anniversary of the German occupation of Denmark, he signed on his own initiative "in the Name of the King" (Danish: I Kongens Navn) an "Agreement relating to the Defense of Greenland" authorizing the United States to defend the Danish colonies on Greenland from German aggression. The treaty was signed by the United States Secretary of State Cordell Hull and approved by President Franklin D. Roosevelt on 7 June 1941.

Kauffmann's treaty was approved by the local officials on Greenland but declared void by the Danish government in Copenhagen. Kauffmann ignored this protest, citing the fact that Denmark was occupied by a hostile power; consequently, he considered the government incapable of protecting Danish interests. The government responded by charging Kauffmann with high treason and stripping him of his rank. Kauffmann ignored both actions. Kauffmann's line was supported by the Danish consuls general in the United States, as well as by the Danish ambassador to Iran. These diplomats were dismissed as well. Kauffmann replied by urging Danish diplomats around the world not to follow instructions from Copenhagen.

Kauffmann was nicknamed "the King of Greenland" for his independent political moves in the Greenland affair.

He was married to Charlotte MacDougall, the daughter of United States Navy Rear Admiral William Dugald MacDougall.

== Rehabilitation ==
Revoking the sentence against Kauffmann was one of the first tasks done by the Danish Parliament following the Liberation of Denmark in May 1945. Kauffmann joined the Cabinet of National Unity and served as Minister without Portfolio from 12 May to 7 November 1945. While Kauffmann was unable to get Denmark to sign the Declaration by United Nations during the war, he was able as minister to join the San Francisco Conference from 25 April 1945 to 26 June 1945 and sign the Charter.

Kauffmann's treaty was adapted in the early 1950s and remains the legal basis for the U.S. Thule Air Base in Greenland.

== Death ==
In June 1963, Kauffmann, suffering from prostate cancer, was killed by his wife in a "mercy killing". His wife, Charlotte, then took her own life.

== In popular culture ==
The film The Good Traitor (Vores mand i Amerika) released in 2020, covers the signing of the agreement over Greenland between Henrik Kauffmann and the United States. Kauffmann is played by Ulrich Thomsen.

== Sources ==
- Beukel, Erik (1997). "Henrik Kauffmann Som Politisk Diplomat". Historie/Jyske Samlinger (in Danish) (2): 318.
