= Grayhall =

Coordinates: 34.088729°N 118.417818°W

- Interactive map of the Grayhall area

General information
- Type: House
- Location: 1100 Carolyn Way, Beverly Hills, California, United States
- Completed: 1909
- Client: Harry D. Lombard

Grayhall is a historic mansion in Beverly Hills, California, U.S.

== History ==
The house was built as a hunting lodge for Harry D. Lombard in 1909. The second owner, Silsby Spalding, added a ballroom to the house in 1919; Silsby went on to serve as the first mayor of Beverly Hills from 1926 to 1929.

In 1919, actor Douglas Fairbanks leased the house and built a tunnel to Pickfair, the house next door that he shared with actress Mary Pickford. The tunnel was subsequently sealed.

Subsequent owners included actor George Hamilton and financier Bernard Cornfeld. The house belonged to Mark R. Hughes, the founder, chairman and CEO of Herbalife, from 1992 to 2000.

It was used in the 1976 version of A Star Is Born as the home of rock star John Norman Howard, played by Kris Kristofferson.

Grayhall was also the facility to host the wedding celebration reception for at the time "America's Sweetheart" actress Valerie Bertinelli and America's own Guitar God, Edward Van Halen in April 1981.

In the 2000s, the estate was also featured in “Bucket List” starring Jack Nicholson & Morgan Freeman as well as the hit HBO series Entourage.
