= Harry L. Sears =

American politician (1920-2002)

Member of the New Jersey Senate from the 10th district
- In office 1968–1972 Serving with Joseph Maraziti
- Preceded by: Thomas J. Hillery; Milton Woolfenden Jr.
- Succeeded by: Peter W. Thomas

Personal details
- Born: January 16, 1920 Butler, New Jersey
- Died: May 17, 2002 (aged 82) Denville Township, New Jersey
- Party: Republican
- Occupation: Attorney and politician

Harry Lloyd Sears (January 16, 1920 – May 17, 2002) was an American lawyer and Republican Party politician who served for 10 years in the New Jersey Legislature. As State Majority Leader he was the Chairman of the New Jersey Committee to re-elect President Richard Nixon (R). He was also legal counsel for the International Controls Corporation, run by Robert Vesco which was under investigation by the Securities Exchange Commission. Sears delivered $200,000 in cash from Vesco who had secretly contributed it to Nixon's Committee for the Re-Election of the President (CREEP). Sears was indicted on charges of bribery and conspiracy, but was granted immunity in return for his testimony which eventually led to Watergate and the resignation of Nixon.

== Early life ==
Sears was born in 1920 in Butler, New Jersey, and graduated from Butler High School in 1937. He graduated in 1942 with a Bachelor of Arts degree in economics from Tusculum College in Greeneville, Tennessee. During World War II he served as a lieutenant in the United States Navy. He received his law degree from Rutgers School of Law—Newark.

== Legislative career ==
Sears was elected to the New Jersey General Assembly from Morris County in 1961 and was re-elected in 1963 and 1965. He was elected to the New Jersey Senate in 1967. In 1969, he unsuccessfully sought the Republican nomination for Governor of New Jersey. He lost the Republican primary to William T. Cahill, also finishing behind U.S. Rep. Charles W. Sandman, Jr., and ahead of State Sen. Frank X. McDermott and Board of Public Utilities Commissioner William E. Ozzard.

From 1970 to 1971, Sears served as the majority leader in the Senate. He was instrumental in passing legislation that created the New Jersey Lottery and the Meadowlands Sports Complex, signed into law by Governor Cahill. In March 1971, he announced that he would resign from office and return to his legal practice.

After leaving office, Sears was named chairman of the New Jersey campaign to re-elect Richard Nixon in the 1972 presidential election. He also served as counsel for the International Controls Corporation, a company run by financier Robert Vesco which was under investigation by the SEC for its takeover of the Investors Overseas Service. Through Sears, Vesco donated $200,000 in cash to the Committee for the Re-Election of the President, also known as CREEP. That money fueled the activities which came to be known as the Watergate scandal and led to the resignation of Nixon. Sears was granted immunity in exchange for his testimony and was never charged.

== Later life ==
Sears later returned to private practice, specializing in land use and real estate law, until retiring in 1992. A longtime resident of Mountain Lakes, Sears moved to Mount Arlington, New Jersey in the mid-1990s. After a short illness, he died in 2002 in Denville Township at the age of 82.
