= Investors Overseas Service =

Financial services company

Investors Overseas Services, Ltd. (IOS) was founded in 1955 by financier Bernard Cornfeld. The company was incorporated outside the United States with funds in Canada and headquartered in Geneva, Switzerland.

In the 1960s, the company employed 25,000 people who sold 18 different mutual funds door-to-door all over Europe, operating mostly in Germany with small investors. The company mainly targeted American expatriates and U.S. servicemen who sought to avoid paying income tax. The mutual fund offerings by the company were called “people’s capitalism” by founder Cornfeld.

In the following decade, the company raised $2.5 billion, due in part to its “Fund of Funds”, which meant investment in shares of other IOS offerings. The offering was very popular in the bull market times, but then the market dropped. IOS was forced into an initial public offering to meet its costs. The next bear market made many investors cash their funds as stock value decreased.

Share value decreased from $18 to $12 in the spring of 1970. Cornfeld formed an investment pool with some other investors, but they lost when the share value dropped to $2.

Financier Robert Vesco who, at the time, was also in financial trouble, turned to Cornfeld and offered his help. Vesco proceeded to use $500 million worth of IOS money to cover his own investments in his International Controls Corporation. When he was discovered, Vesco fled to Costa Rica. IOS then collapsed and in the process ruined a number of US and European banks.
