= Mason Sears =

American politician (1899–1973)

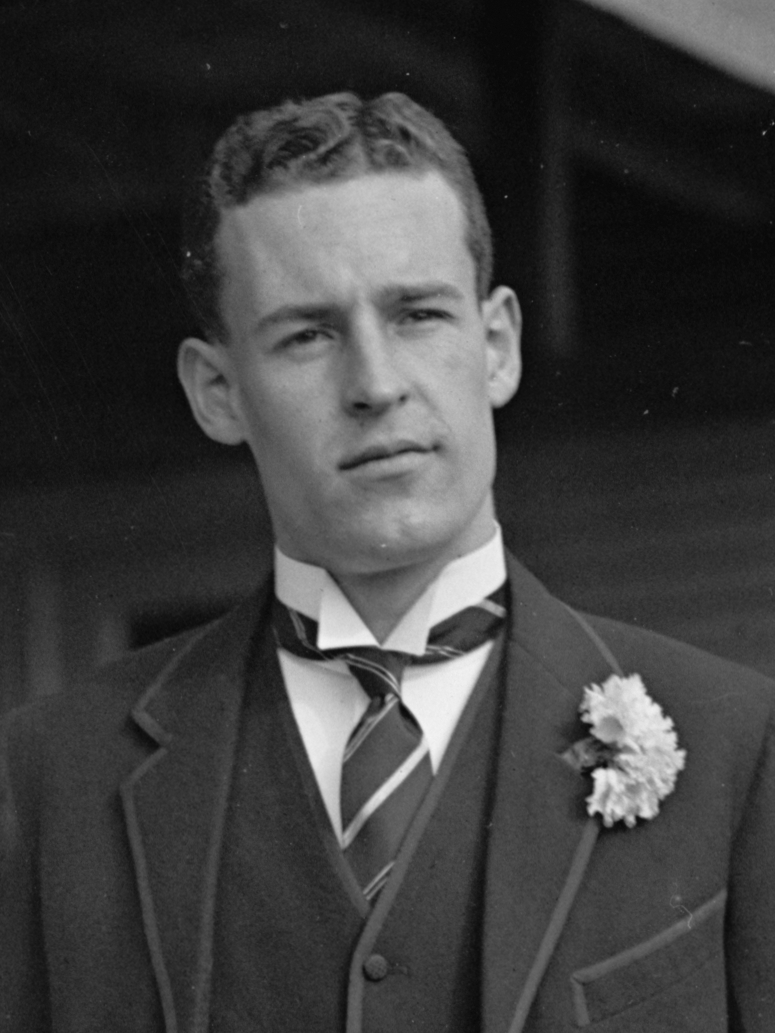
- Sears in 1924

Member of the Massachusetts Senate from the 2nd Norfolk District
- In office 1947–1949
- Preceded by: James Austin Peckham
- Succeeded by: Leslie Bradley Cutler

Member of the Massachusetts Senate from the Norfolk and Middlesex District
- In office 1939–1942
- Preceded by: Samuel H. Wragg
- Succeeded by: James Austin Peckham

Personal details
- Born: December 29, 1899 Boston, Massachusetts, U.S.
- Died: December 13, 1973 (aged 73) Faulkner Hospital, Boston, Massachusetts, U.S.
- Party: Republican
- Spouse: Zilla MacDougall
- Children: Philip Mason Sears
- Education: Harvard College
- Occupation: Salesman; Politician

Philip Mason Sears (born December 29, 1899 — December 13, 1973) was an American politician and diplomat who served as an ambassador, member of the Massachusetts General Court, and the chairman of the Massachusetts Republican Party.

== Personal life ==
Sears was born on December 29, 1899, to Philip Shelton Sears, a sculptor, and Mary Cabot (Higginson) Sears. He attended St. Mark's School and graduated from Harvard College in 1922. On December 29, 1924, he married Zilla MacDougall, the daughter of Admiral William D. MacDougall.

He had a son, Philip Mason Sears, and two grandchildren. He lived in Dedham, Massachusetts and died at the Faulkner Hospital.

== Naval career ==
Sears served in the United States Navy, where he was an attaché to the United States State Department delegation in Peking, China. Here he met Danish ambassador Henrik Kauffmann, who would become his friend and later marry Sears' sister-in-law Charlotte MacDougall. Sears also served in the Navy during World War II.

== Political career ==
Sears was a Member of the Massachusetts House of Representatives from 1935 to 1937 and the Massachusetts Senate from 1939 to 1943 and again from 1947 to 1949. Sears was Massachusetts Republican State Chair from 1949 to 1950 and was delegate to 1948 and 1952 Republican National Conventions from Massachusetts. He stepped down as chairman of the State Committee after his attempt to liberalize the party failed to gain traction with other party leaders.

Sears worked on the United States Senate campaigns of Henry Cabot Lodge Jr., a colleague of his in the state legislature and the husband of his second cousin.

== Diplomatic career ==
He was nominated by President Dwight Eisenhower and served from 1953 to 1960 as the United States representative to United Nations Trusteeship Council. In 1960, he was ambassador and chairman of the United Nations Visiting Mission to East Africa.

Sears was United States' delegate to Ethiopian Emperor Haile Selassie's silver jubilee in 1955. Two years later, in 1957, he accompanied then-Vice President Richard Nixon as the United States' delegate to the independence celebration of Ghana. Sears also served as special Ambassador to Cameroon' independence celebration.

He wrote a book, Years of High Purpose, about U.S. foreign policy towards Africa under John Foster Dulles.

== Popular culture ==
- W. Douglas Burden wrote of his hunting trips with Mason Sears, to Inner Mongolia and Indo-China in 1922 and 1923, after they both graduated from college. The relevant chapters are "On the Sino-Mongolian Frontier" and "Glimpses of the Jungle" in Look to the Wilderness.

== See also ==
- Massachusetts legislature: 1935–1936, 1937–1938, 1939, 1941–1942, 1947–1948

Party political offices
Preceded by Lloyd B. Waring	Chairman of the Massachusetts Republican Party; 1949–1950	Succeeded by Daniel Tyler Jr.
