= William Dugald MacDougall =

United States Navy rear admiral (1868–1932)

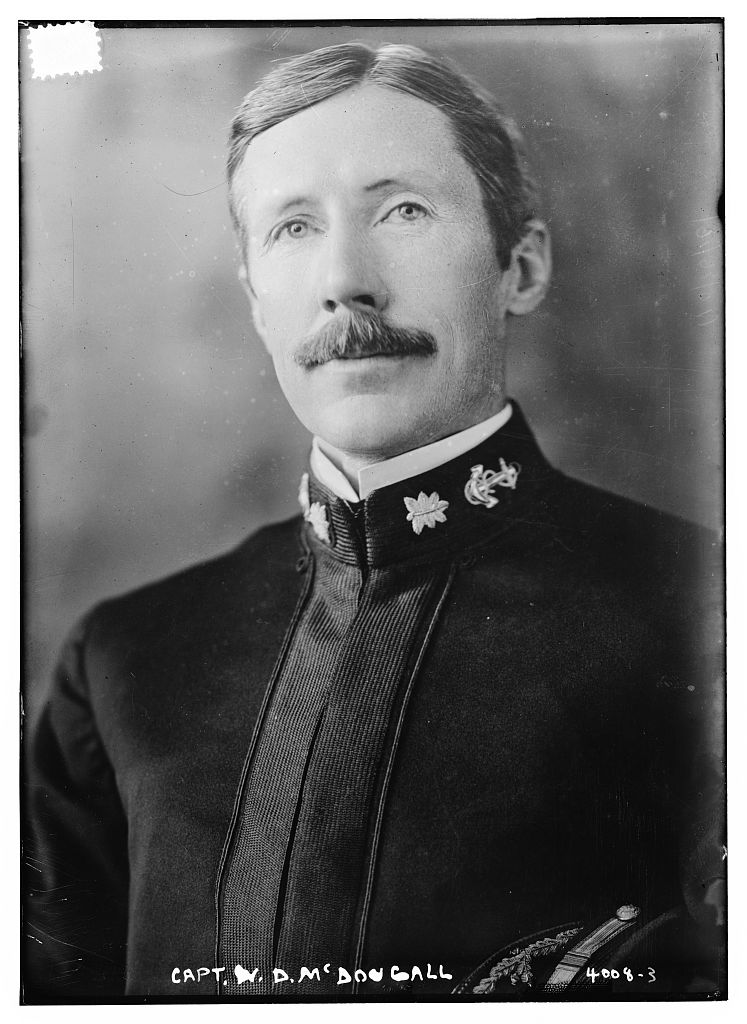
- MacDougall in 1916
- Born: June 20, 1868; Auburn, New York
- Died: March 5, 1943 (aged 74); Portsmouth, New Hampshire
- Burial place: Arlington National Cemetery
- Spouse: Charlotte Sackett Stone
- Children: 2
- Relatives: Henrik Kauffmann (S-i-L); Mason Sears (S-i-L)
- Military career
- Allegiance: United States
- Branch: United States Navy
- Rank: Rear admiral

William Dugald MacDougall (June 20, 1868 – March 5, 1943) was a rear admiral of the Fifth Naval District in the United States Navy.

== Biography ==
He was born at Auburn, New York, on June 20, 1868, to Clinton Dugald MacDougall and Eva Sabine. He graduated from the United States Naval Academy in 1889. He married Charlotte Sackett Stone. One of their daughters married Henrik Kauffmann, Denmark's ambassador to the United States during World War II.

He retired on July 1, 1932. He died on March 5, 1943, in Portsmouth, New Hampshire. He was buried at Arlington National Cemetery.
