= Bernard Cornfeld =

American investor and financier

- Born: 17 August 1927; Istanbul, Turkey
- Died: 27 February 1995 (aged 67); London, United Kingdom
- Other name: Bernie
- Occupations: Financier, businessman

Bernard "Bernie" Cornfeld (17 August 1927 – 27 February 1995) was a prominent businessman and international financier who sold investments in US mutual funds. He was tried and acquitted in Switzerland for mismanagement of his mutual fund sales company Investors Overseas Services (IOS).

== Early life ==
Bernard Cornfeld was born in Istanbul, in Turkey. His father was a Romanian-Jewish actor; his mother was from a Russian-Jewish family. They moved to the United States when Bernard was four years old; his father died two years later. The young Brooklyn-raised Cornfeld worked after school each day in fruit stores and as a delivery boy. He had a stammer as well as a natural gift for selling and when a schoolfriend's father died, the two of them used the US$3,000 insurance money to purchase and run an age and weight guessing stand at the Coney Island funfair. He graduated from Abraham Lincoln High School and Brooklyn College.

He initially worked as a social worker, but then switched to selling mutual funds for an investment house.

== Investors Overseas Services ==
In 1955, Cornfeld formed his own mutual fund sales company, Investors Overseas Services (IOS), with principal offices in Geneva, Switzerland, although it was incorporated in Panama. Although the executive headquarters were in Geneva, the main operational offices of IOS were in Ferney-Voltaire, France, across the French border from Geneva. During this period, Diane von Furstenberg worked for Cornfeld as a receptionist.

Cornfeld decided that mutual funds should take their fees from the profits they made for their investors, not just a percentage of the money invested.

The IOS system collapsed in 1970. Cornfeld was arrested in Switzerland in 1973 and sentenced to 11 months in preventive prison; however, he was ultimately acquitted in 1979. Having kept part of his earnings, he was able to maintain a luxurious (albeit less ostentatious) lifestyle until he died in 1995.

== Other business ventures ==
Following his acquittal, Cornfeld settled in Beverly Hills, California, where he ingratiated himself to film industry circles. For a period of time until 1992, he lived in the Grayhall mansion, built in 1909 and at one time leased by Douglas Fairbanks. Cornfeld numbered among his friends Elizabeth Taylor, Michelle Phillips, Warren Beatty, Laurence Harvey, Victor Lownes, Hugh Hefner, Richard Harris, Al Capp, Tony Curtis, Howard Sackler, John Heyman and Simon Reuben.

In 1972, Cornfeld bankrolled the Paradise Ballroom, partnering with New York showman Jerry Brandt. The club, an attempt by Brandt to re-create his New York disco, The Electric Circus in Los Angeles was a failure, and Cornfeld closed the business.

Grayhall mansion doubled as the home of rock star John Norman Howard (Kris Kristofferson) in the 1976 version of A Star Is Born starring Barbra Streisand. At the age of 60, Cornfeld had an affair with the then 19-year-old Heidi Fleiss.

By the 1990s, Cornfeld had developed an obsession for health foods and vitamins, renounced red meat and seldom drank alcohol. In his last years he was a chairman of a land development firm in Arizona and also owned a real estate company in Los Angeles.

== Death ==
Bernard Cornfeld suffered a stroke and died of MRSA on 27 February 1995 in London, England. He was tended to by his 17 year old daughter, Jessica.

== Sources ==
- The Bernie Cornfeld Story by Bert Cantor, (Lyle Stuart, Inc., 1970). ISBN 0-8184-0013-7
- With title quoting Cornfeld's celebrated pitch – Do You Sincerely Want To Be Rich? by Charles Raw with Godfrey Hodgson and Bruce Page (Originally published by André Deutsch in 1971, ISBN 0-233-96328-6; reprinted by the "Library of Larceny", 2005, ISBN 0-7679-2006-6 )
