= George A. Redding =

Politician from New Jersey, US (d. 1960)

Member of the New Jersey Senate from Cape May County, New Jersey
- In office 1945–1948
- Preceded by: I. Grant Scott
- Succeeded by: Anthony J. Cafiero

Mayor of North Wildwood, New Jersey
- In office January 1, 1926 – December 31, 1949
- Preceded by: Herbert M. Shivers
- Succeeded by: George Busfield

Sheriff of Cape May County
- In office 1922–1925
- Preceded by: Mead Tomlin
- Succeeded by: James T. Hoffman

Personal details
- Born: July 1, 1880 Philadelphia, Pennsylvania, U.S.
- Died: February 8, 1960 (aged 79) Cape May Court House, New Jersey, U.S.
- Party: Republican

George A. Redding (July 1, 1880 – February 8, 1960) was an American Republican Party politician who served as Cape May County Sheriff, mayor of North Wildwood, New Jersey, and represented Cape May County in the New Jersey Senate.

== Personal life ==
Born in Philadelphia on July 1, 1880, Redding was the son of an Irish immigrant from County Mayo who became a detective in the Philadelphia Police Department and died in line of service. Educated in Philadelphia, Redding became a city police officer himself at age 21. At the age of 24, Redding relocated to Atlantic City. He relocated to Cape May County, in 1903, where he became a lifeguard and later a commercial fisherman. Redding married Margaret Jones and had one child, Margaret M. Redding before divorcing and remarrying Margaret. Redding held a number of official positions for which he was honored by having the Wildwood bridge named after himself. These positions included chief of the Anglesea Fire Company, municipal clerk of Wildwood, police chief of North Wildwood police chief and sheriff of Cape May County.

== Career ==
Redding was elected to the position of Cape May County Sheriff in 1922, serving until 1925. Being elected to in 1926, he served as North Wildwood mayor until 1949. In 1945, he was also elected to the state Senate, and held the position until 1948.

Redding died on February 8, 1960, at Burdette Tomlin Memorial Hospital ⋅(since renamed as Cooper University Hospital Cape Regional) in Cape May Court House, after experiencing a broken hip following a fall at his home in North Wildwood.

== Electoral history ==
=== New Jersey State Senate ===
Cape May County General Election, 1945
Party	Candidate	Votes	%
Republican	George A. Redding	7,460	69.73
Democratic	Robert Bright	3,239	30.27
Total votes		10,699	100.0
