= Air Victory Museum =

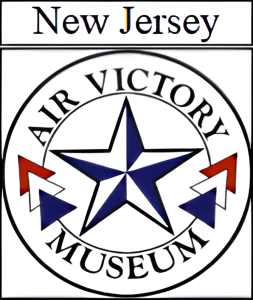

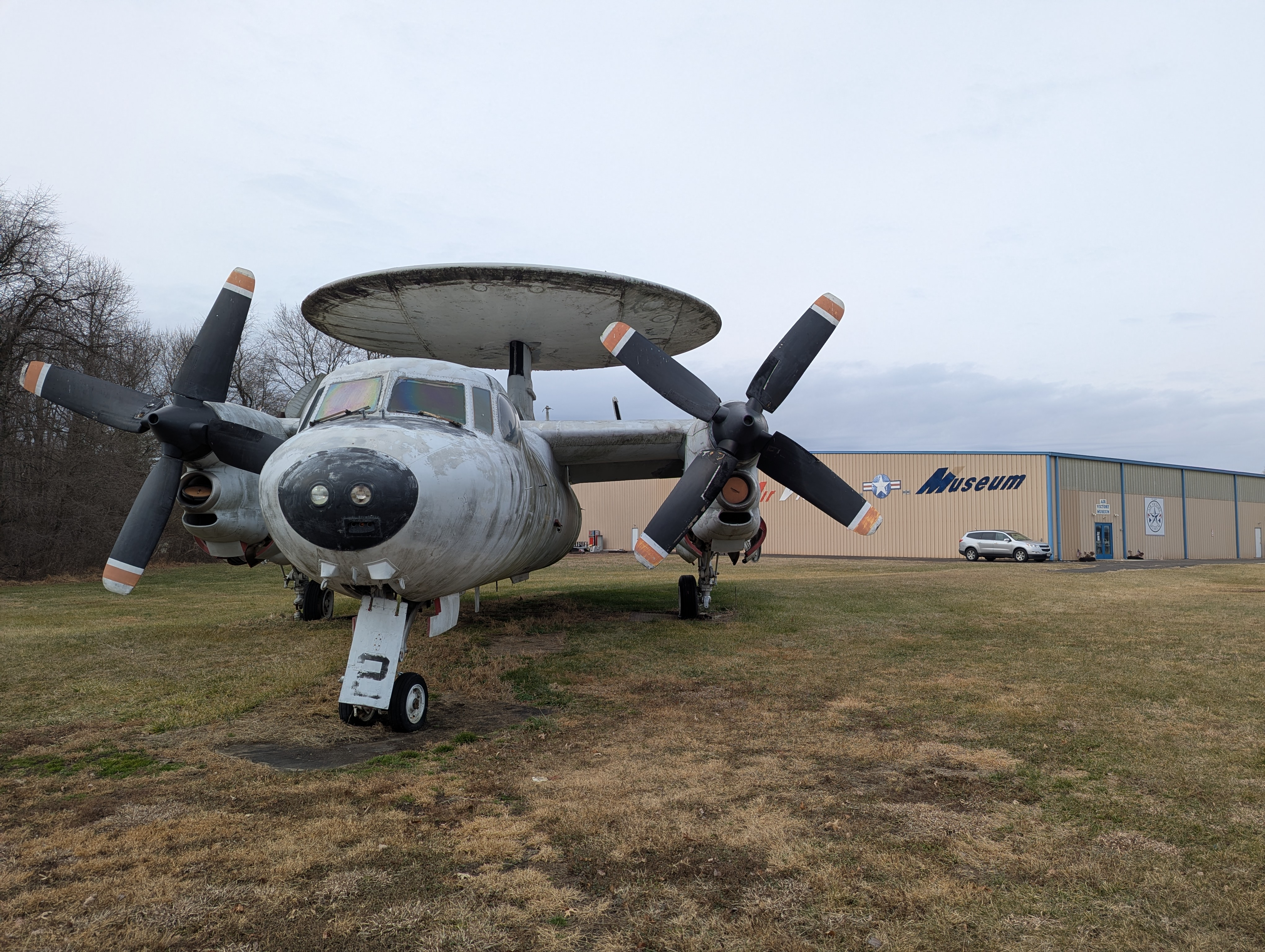
- Museum exterior with the museums' Grumman E-2 Hawkeye

- Location within New Jersey
- Established: 1989
- Location: Lumberton, New Jersey
- Coordinates: 39.9396°N 74.8447°W
- Type: Aviation museum
- Founder: Steve Snyder
- Website: njavm.org

The Air Victory Museum is an aviation museum located at the South Jersey Regional Airport in Lumberton, New Jersey.

== History ==
The museum was founded by Steve Snyder, the president of Steve Snyder Enterprises and a former Air Force reservist, in 1989, with the goals of "airpower advocacy", "education" and "honoring the winners". The previous year, he had purchased the South Jersey Regional Airport at a bankruptcy auction.

In 1994, the museum began construction on a 48,000 sq ft (4,500 m^{2}) hangar, which was to be the restoration and storage portion of an eventual 400,000 sq ft (37,000 m^{2}) facility. (Note: In the meantime, Snyder organized a project to restore a Me 262 that had been on display at NAS Willow Grove for the U.S. Navy in exchange for the ability to use it as a template for flying replicas. After Snyder's death, what had become known as the Me 262 Project was completed by another organization.) The museum began acquiring additional aircraft and on 25 February 1995 an A-7 and an F-4 arrived by helicopter from Naval Air Engineering Station Lakehurst. A third aircraft, an RA-5C, was destroyed when the crew of the helicopter was forced to drop it. After four years of work, the museum opened to the public.

Then, on 19 June 1999, before construction could begin on additional buildings, Snyder was killed in the crash of his F-86 at the airport. As a result of the crash, plans for expansion of the museum and the airport were opposed by local residents.

== Facilities ==
The museum has a library with 3,000 books.

== Collection ==
=== Aircraft ===
- Aereon 26
- Beechcraft T-34B Mentor
- Douglas A-4C Skyhawk
- Fisher FP-404
- Grumman E-2B Hawkeye
- Grumman F-14A Tomcat
- Lockheed F-80A Shooting Star – forward fuselage
- McDonnell F-4A Phantom II
- North American F-86L Sabre
- LTV A-7B Corsair II
- RH-53D Sea Stallion
- Northrop OQ-19A Drone
- Ryan Navion
- Wright Flyer – Replica
- Messerschmitt ME-109G – Replica

=== Engines ===
- Righter Type 2-GS-17
- Ranger L-440
- Continental O-470-4
- R-4360
- R-2800-65W
- XJ30-WE-9
- J65-W-5F
- TF30-P-408
- Marquardt C-20D
- Martin 4-333
- Ranger V-77011
- Junkers Jumo 004
- XJ-79-GE-13
- TF30-P-414A
- Walter 109-500 RATO
- Allison J33-A-35k

=== Ordnance ===
- AGM-69 SRAM
- B-61 Nuclear Bomb
- 2.75" FFAR Rocket
- CBU-58 Cluster Bomb
- MK. 46 Torpedo
- MK-15 Practice Bomb
