= Fostertown, New Jersey =

Populated place in Burlington County, New Jersey, US

- Unincorporated community
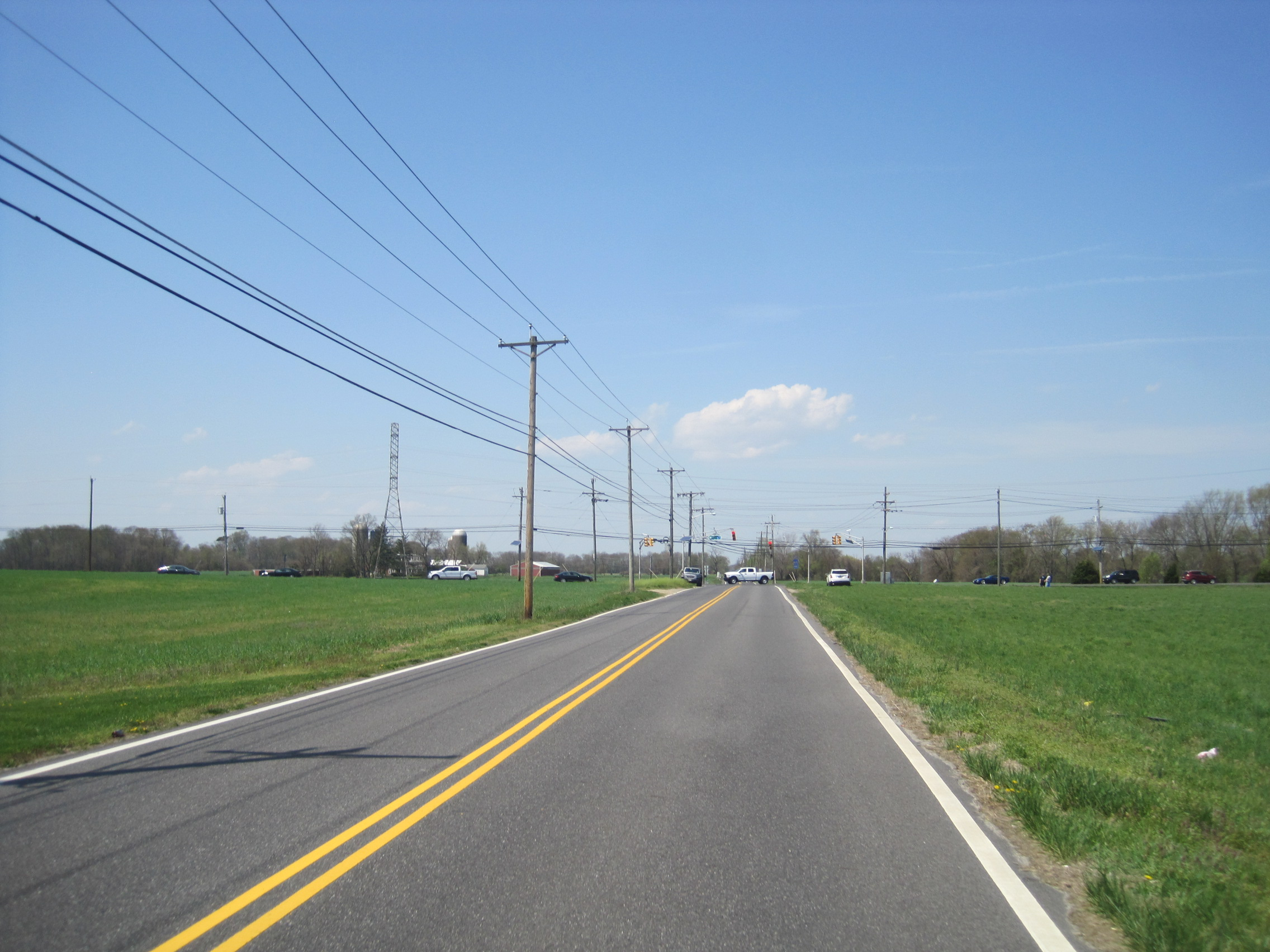
- Fostertown Road

- Location in Burlington County (Inset: Burlington County in New Jersey) Fostertown (New Jersey) Fostertown (the United States)
- Coordinates: 39°56′34″N 74°49′03″W
- Country: United States
- State: New Jersey
- County: Burlington
- Township: Lumberton
- Elevation: 39 ft (12 m)
- Time zone: UTC−05:00 (Eastern (EST))
  - Summer (DST): UTC−04:00 (EDT)
- Area code: 609
- GNIS feature ID: 876429

Fostertown is an unincorporated community located within Lumberton Township in Burlington County, in the U.S. state of New Jersey. The site was founded in 1735 by William Foster, who established a plantation on modern-day West Bella Bridge Road. The area is largely farmland with some houses and a high-voltage power line dotting the landscape.

== Transportation ==
County Route 541 is a major road that travels through the center of Fostertown.

The Flying W Airport is south of Fostertown, partially in Lumberton Township and neighboring Medford. The South Jersey Regional Airport is another airport located west of Fostertown.
