= William M. Johnson =

American politician (1847–1928)

William Mindred Johnson
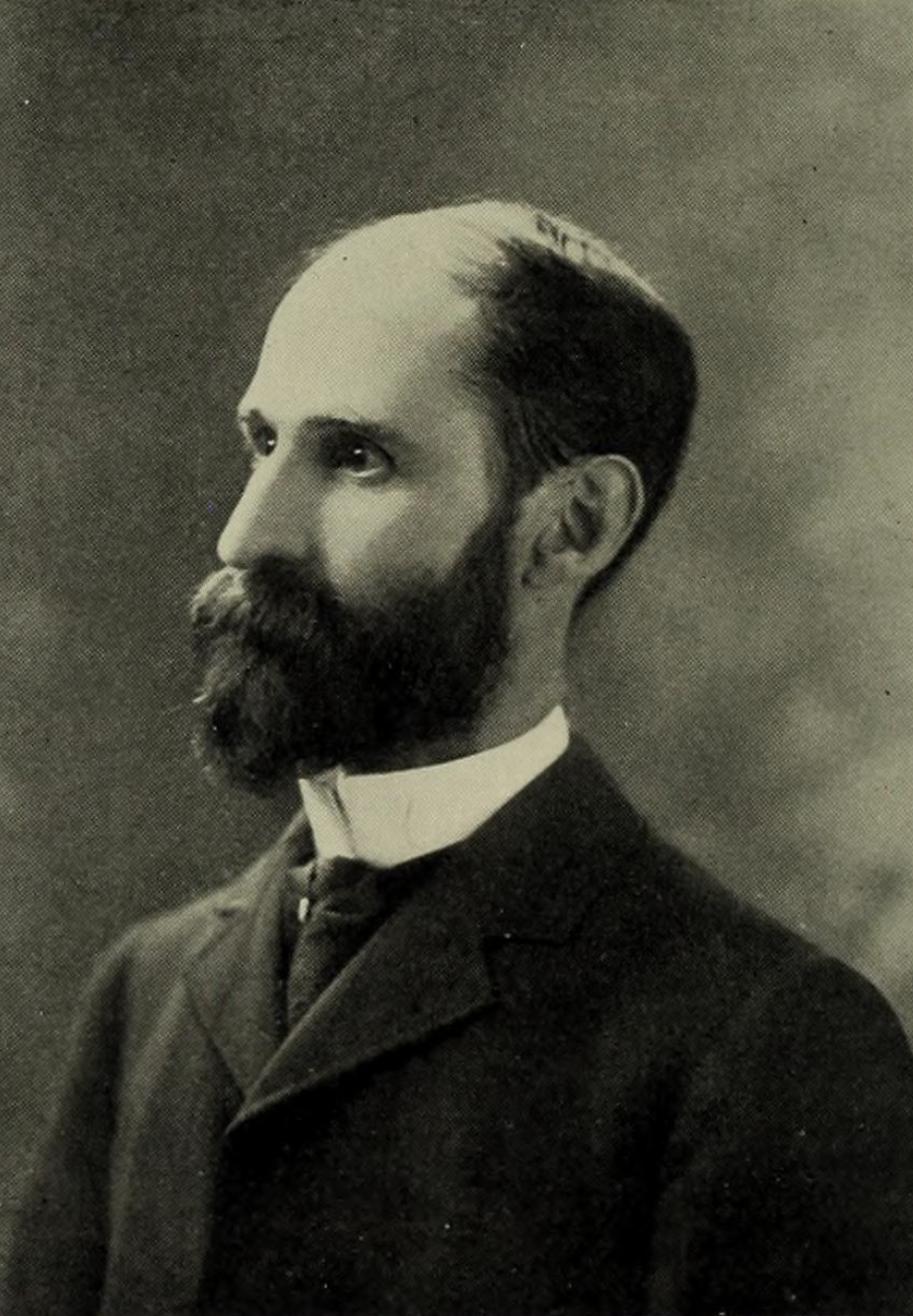
- Born: December 2, 1847; Newton, New Jersey
- Died: September 11, 1928 (aged 80); Hackensack, New Jersey
- Education: Princeton University, A.B. (1867)

41st President of the New Jersey Senate
- In office 1900
- Preceded by: Charles A. Reed
- Succeeded by: Mahlon Pitney

William Mindred Johnson (December 2, 1847 − September 11, 1928) was a U.S. attorney, philanthropist, and politician. He was the son of Whitfield S. Johnson, who served as New Jersey Secretary of State from 1861 to 1866.

== Early life and education ==
Johnson was born in Newton, New Jersey to Whitfield Schaeffer and Ellen (Green) Johnson. He attended the Newton Collegiate Institute and the New Jersey State Model School at Trenton, and received a A.B. from Princeton College in 1867. He continued at Princeton, receiving a Master of Arts, and went on to read law with Edward W. Scudder. He was admitted to the bar in June 1870, and practiced law in Trenton until moving to Hackensack, New Jersey in 1874. On October 22, 1872, he married Maria E. White of Trenton, and the couple had three children.

== Political career ==
In 1895, Johnson was the first Republican elected to the New Jersey State Senate from Bergen County. He was re-elected in 1898, and served as President of the Senate in 1900. During this term, Johnson was Acting Governor from May 21 to June 19 while Governor Voorhees was out of the country. Johnson left the State Senate when he was appointed as First Assistant Postmaster by President William McKinley in August 1900. Johnson was a delegate to the Republican National Conventions in 1888 and 1904.

== Philanthropy ==
Johnson was a financial supporter of Princeton, his alma mater. He donated the land and paid for the construction of a building for a public library in Hackensack. He also donated $5,000.00 for the purchase of books. Johnson additionally provided the salaries of the library staff for the first two years of its operation. In 1915, Johnson donated an additional $30,000 for an expansion of the library. The Johnson Public Library is located at 274 Main Street and is a member of Bridging Communities, Connecting Library Services.

== Death ==
Johnson died as a result of bronchitis at his home in Hackensack on September 11, 1928.

Political offices
Preceded by Charles A. Reed	President of the New Jersey Senate; 1900	Succeeded by Mahlon Pitney
