= LLY =

LLY may refer to:

- Labour League of Youth, British Labour Party youth organisation from 1926 to c. 1960
- Eli Lilly and Company; New York Stock Exchange symbol LLY
- Llwynypia railway station, Wales; National Rail station code LLY
- LLY, an engine model produced by General Motors
- South Jersey Regional Airport, United States; IATA airport code LLY
