= Senator Lance =

Senator Lance may refer to:

- Leonard Lance (born 1952), New Jersey State Senate
- Wesley Lance (1908–2007), New Jersey State Senate
