= Senator Cafiero =

Senator Cafiero may refer to:

- Anthony Cafiero (1900–1982), New Jersey State Senate, father of James Cafiero
- Antonio Cafiero (1922–2014), Argentine Senate
- James Cafiero (1928–2023), New Jersey State Senate

== See also ==
- Capri Cafaro (born 1977), Ohio State Senate
- Mary Caferro (born 1959), Montana State Senate
