= Charles A. Reed (New Jersey politician) =

American politician (1857–1940)

Charles Arthur Reed
- Reed circa 1895

New Jersey Senate
- In office 1896–1900

New Jersey General Assembly
- In office 1895–1896

Personal details
- Born: 1857 Fort Wayne, Indiana, US
- Died: December 17, 1940 (aged 82–83) Brooklyn, New York, US
- Education: Rutgers University (1878); Columbia Law School (1883)
- Profession: Lawyer politician

Charles Arthur Reed (1857 – December 17, 1940) was a New Jersey politician who served in the New Jersey General Assembly from 1895 to 1896, and then in the New Jersey Senate from 1896 to 1900, serving as president of the Senate from 1899 to 1900.

Born in Fort Wayne, Indiana Charles was the oldest son of Col. Hugh B. Reed, of the 44th Indiana during the Civil War. He received an undergraduate degree from Rutgers University in 1878 and a law degree from Columbia Law School in 1883. He then worked for the Bureau of Pensions in Washington, D.C., for a time, eventually returning to New Jersey and becoming involved in politics.

== Death ==
Reed died at the Park Hotel in Brooklyn at the age of 83.
