= George H. Stanger =

American politician (1902–1958)

74th President of the New Jersey Senate
- In office 1943
- Preceded by: I. Grant Scott
- Succeeded by: Howard Eastwood

Member of the New Jersey Senate from the Cumberland district
- In office 1938–1946
- Preceded by: Linwood W. Erickson
- Succeeded by: Elmer H. Wene

Member of the New Jersey General Assembly from the Cumberland district
- In office 1936
- Preceded by: Harry Adler
- Succeeded by: G. Milton Loper

Personal details
- Born: September 25, 1902 Glassboro, New Jersey, U.S.
- Died: March 2, 1958 (aged 55) Philadelphia, Pennsylvania, U.S.
- Party: Republican
- Education: Bridgeton High School
- Alma mater: Lafayette College

George H. Stanger (September 25, 1902 – March 2, 1958) was an American Republican Party politician who served in New Jersey General Assembly in 1936 and the New Jersey Senate from 1938 to 1946.

A resident of Vineland, New Jersey, Stanger was born in Glassboro, New Jersey. He attended Bridgeton High School and graduated from Lafayette College.

== Electoral history ==
=== New Jersey State Senate ===
Cumberland County General Election, 1943
Party	Candidate	Votes	%
Republican	George H. Stanger (incumbent)	13,589	62.61
Democratic	Harry Adler	8,116	37.39
Total votes		21,705	100.0
Republican hold			

Political offices
Preceded by I. Grant Scott	President of the New Jersey Senate; 1943	Succeeded by Howard Eastwood
