= Senator Foran =

Senator Foran may refer to:

- Arthur F. Foran (1882–1961), New Jersey State Senate
- Walter E. Foran (1919–1986), New Jersey State Senate
