= Senator Scott =

Senator Scott may refer to:

== Members of the United States Senate ==
- Hugh Scott (1900–1994), U.S. Senator from Pennsylvania from 1959 to 1977
- John Scott (Pennsylvania politician, born 1824) (1824–1896), U.S. Senator from Pennsylvania from 1869 to 1875
- Nathan B. Scott (1842–1924), U.S. Senator from West Virginia from 1899 to 1911
- Rick Scott (born 1952), U.S. Senator from Florida since 2019
- Tim Scott (born 1965), U.S. Senator from South Carolina since 2013
- W. Kerr Scott (1896–1958), U.S. Senator from North Carolina from 1954 to 1958
- William L. Scott (1915–1997), U.S. Senator from Virginia from 1973 to 1979

== United States state senate members ==
- Abram M. Scott (1785–1833), Mississippi State Senate
- Allen D. Scott (1831–1897), New York State Senate
- Bobby Scott (politician) (born 1947), Virginia State Senate
- Charles Frederick Scott (1860–1938), Kansas State Senate
- Charles Scott (Wyoming politician) (born 1945), Wyoming State Senate
- David Scott (Georgia politician) (born 1946), Georgia State Senate
- Delbert Lee Scott (born 1949), Missouri State Senate
- Eva Mae Fleming Scott (1926–2019), Virginia State Senate
- Frank D. Scott (1878–1951), Michigan State Senate
- George E. Scott (1860–1915), Wisconsin State Senate
- George G. Scott (1811–1886), New York State Senate
- George W. Scott (politician) (born 1937), Washington State Senate
- I. Grant Scott (1897–1964), New Jersey State Senate
- Jack Scott (California politician) (born 1933), California State Senate
- John B. Scott (1789–1854), New York State Senate
- John E. Scott (born 1939), Missouri State Senate
- John L. Scott Jr. (born 1953), South Carolina State Senate
- John Morin Scott (1730–1784), New York State Senate
- John P. Scott (1933–2010), New Jersey State Senate
- John Scott (Iowa politician) (1824–1903), Iowa State Senate
- Martha G. Scott (born 1935), Michigan State Senate
- Phil Scott (born 1958), Vermont State Senate
- Randy Scott (politician) (1946–2015), South Carolina State Senate
- Ray Scott (Colorado politician), Colorado State Senate
- Thomas B. Scott (1829–1886), Wisconsin State Senate
- Tom Scott (Connecticut politician) (born 1958), Connecticut State Senate
- Walter F. Scott (1856–1938), Vermont State Senate
- Z. D. Scott (1846–1922), South Dakota State Senate
