= Anthony Cafiero =

American politician

Anthony James Cafiero

Member of the New Jersey Senate from Cape May County
- In office 1949–1953
- Preceded by: George A. Redding
- Succeeded by: Charles Sandman

Personal details
- Born: February 11, 1900 Philadelphia, Pennsylvania
- Died: September 28, 1982 (aged 82) Middle Township, New Jersey
- Party: Republican
- Children: James Cafiero

Anthony James Cafiero (February 11, 1900 – September 28, 1982) was a member of the New Jersey Senate from 1949 to 1953.

He was born in Philadelphia, Pennsylvania, the son of a local barber. Cafiero moved to North Wildwood, New Jersey, in 1921. He was the Cape May County prosecutor from 1944 to 1946, and was a county judge in Cape May County from 1946 to 1948. He was a member of the New Jersey Senate, representing Cape May County as a Republican, from 1948 to 1954. He served in the New Jersey Superior Court from 1954 until retiring in 1970. A resident of Middle Township, New Jersey, he died on September 28, 1982, at Burdette Tomlin Memorial Hospital.

== Family ==
He married Hazel Koenig in 1926. Their son, James Cafiero, served in the New Jersey Senate and General Assembly.
