= Clifford Ross Powell =

American politician (1893–1973)

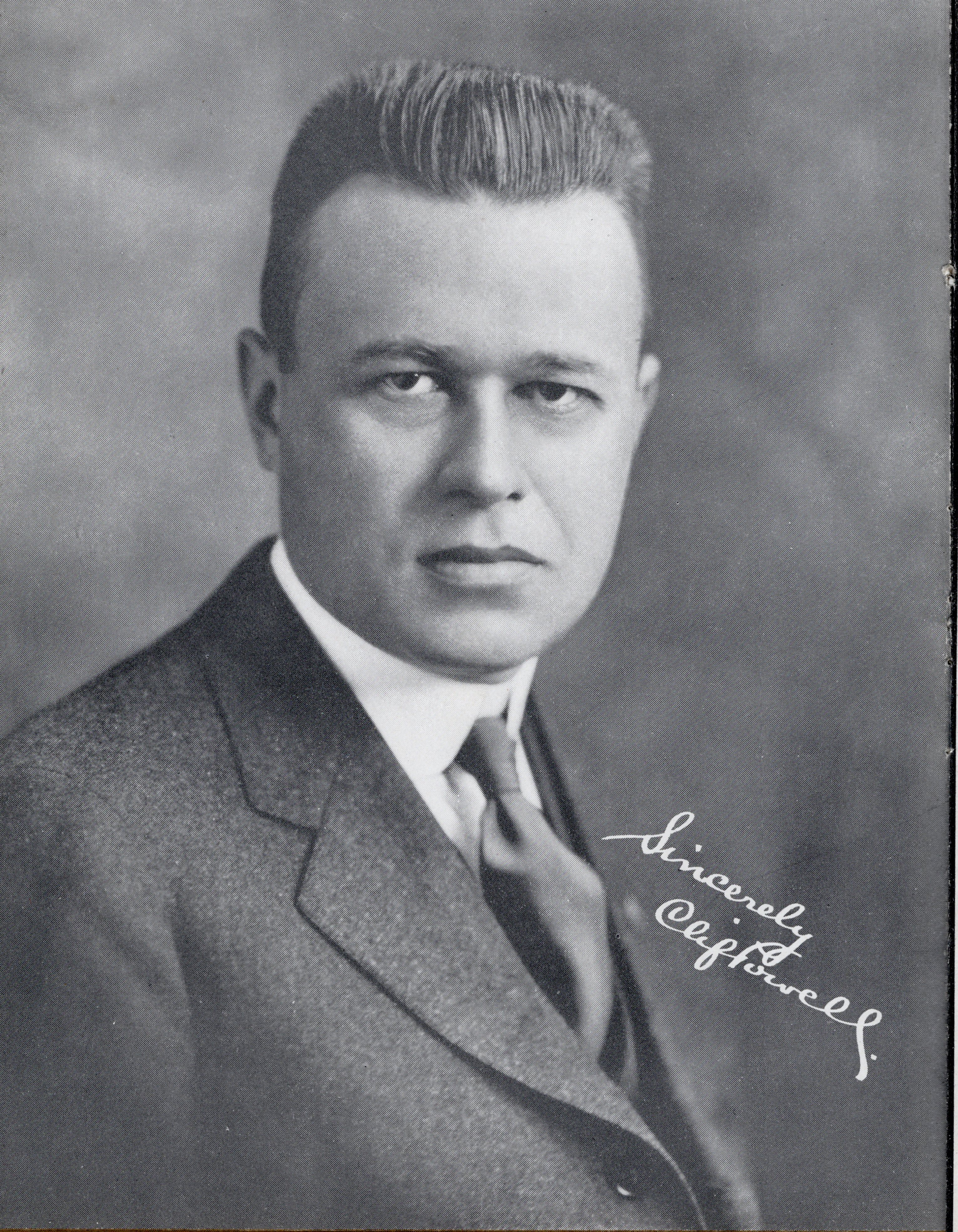

Acting Governor of New Jersey
- In office January 3, 1935 – January 8, 1935
- Preceded by: Arthur H. Moore
- Succeeded by: Horace G. Prall (acting)

Member of the New Jersey State Senate from Burlington County
- In office 1928–1940
- Preceded by: Emmor Roberts
- Succeeded by: Howard Eastwood

Member of the New Jersey State Assembly
- In office 1922–1925

22nd Chief of Staff of New Jersey
- In office 1947–1948
- Preceded by: James Isaiah Bowers
- Succeeded by: Edward C. Rose

Personal details
- Born: July 26, 1893 Lumberton Township, New Jersey, U.S.
- Died: March 28, 1973 (aged 79) Mount Holly, New Jersey, U.S.
- Party: Republican

Military service
- Allegiance: United States
- Branch/service: New Jersey National Guard; United States Army
- Years of service: 1913–1948
- Rank: Major General
- Battles/wars: World War I World War II
- Awards: Legion of Merit; Bronze Star Medal; Purple Heart; Croix de Guerre; New Jersey Distinguished Service Medal

Clifford Ross Powell (July 26, 1893 – March 28, 1973) was an American attorney, Republican politician, acting governor of New Jersey, and major general in the New Jersey National Guard. During World War II, he served as commander of the 44th Infantry Division and later as Chief of Psychological Warfare for the Twelfth United States Army Group in the European Theater of Operations.

Powell served in the New Jersey General Assembly, where he was majority leader and speaker, and later represented Burlington County in the New Jersey Senate. As president of the Senate, he briefly served as acting governor of New Jersey in January 1935.

== Biography ==
He was born in Lumberton Township, New Jersey on July 26, 1893. He was educated at Mount Holly High School, studied law, and attained admission to the bar. Powell practiced in Mount Holly, New Jersey, and served as an Assistant County Prosecutor for Burlington County, New Jersey and the city or town attorney for several Burlington County municipalities.

Powell enlisted in the New Jersey National Guard as a private in 1913, and advanced to the rank of sergeant. He served in the United States Army during World War I, receiving a commission in the Aviation branch. During World War I, Powell served with the French 9th Bombardment Group and participated in six major operations. He was shot down and wounded on June 1, 1918, and his flight record credited him with the destruction of two enemy aircraft and participation in bombing raids. His World War I decorations included the Purple Heart, the French Croix de Guerre, and the New Jersey Distinguished Service Medal.

In 1922 he was elected to the New Jersey State Assembly. He was Majority Leader in 1924, and served as Speaker in 1925.

He was a member of the New Jersey Senate from Burlington County, New Jersey from 1928 to 1939. He served as acting governor for the last five days of his tenure as President of the New Jersey Senate, after A. Harry Moore resigned to take a seat in the United States Senate. In his brief time as acting governor, he took the opportunity to abolish the New Jersey State Recovery Administration, the state-level counterpart of the National Recovery Administration, which had been establishing minimum prices and other "fair competition" codes. He ran unsuccessfully for governor in 1937.

Official U.S. Army portrait of Powell as a Brigadier General

In 1941, Powell was promoted to major general in the New Jersey National Guard and commanded the 44th Infantry Division. He was relieved of division command after the 1941 GHQ maneuvers in North and South Carolina. After the United States entered World War II, Powell returned to active duty as a colonel in the Army of the United States.

In the European Theater, Powell served with the Publicity and Psychological Warfare organization of the Twelfth United States Army Group. The New Jersey Department of Military and Veterans Affairs describes him as Chief of Psychological Warfare, 12th U.S. Army Group. A 1945 history of the Second Mobile Radio Broadcasting Company identifies him as Psychological Warfare Officer, Twelfth Army Group, and records that requests for tactical psychological warfare support reached Powell in Paris, where he assigned officers to organize the Psychological Warfare Combat Team, First United States Army.

Before the Normandy invasion, Powell helped plan tactical psychological warfare activities for the coming campaign. The history of the 2d Mobile Radio Broadcasting Company states that Powell’s representatives interviewed trained personnel at Clevedon while Powell was planning the overall tactical psychological warfare activities for the invasion. Twelfth Army Group psychological warfare activities included tactical leaflets, mobile radio broadcasting, loudspeaker appeals, prisoner-of-war interrogation for morale intelligence, tactical newspapers, and support to information-control operations in occupied Germany. A commendation issued by Headquarters, 12th Army Group Publicity and Psychological Warfare credited the Second Mobile Radio Broadcasting Company with making a substantial contribution to psychological warfare operations in support of 12th Army Group military operations. Historian Daniel Lerner later described the Twelfth Army Group under Powell as a major American field center of Allied psychological warfare on the Continent. After the war, Powell and Brigadier General Robert A. McClure served as consultants for the General Board study Psychological Warfare in the European Theater of Operation, Study No. 131.

Powell continued to serve in the New Jersey National Guard until his military retirement in 1948. As commander of the New Jersey National Guard after World War II, Powell was involved in New Jersey’s early effort to desegregate its Guard units. In 1947, after New Jersey adopted a constitution prohibiting racial segregation in the militia, Governor Alfred E. Driscoll identified Powell as organizing the headquarters of the 372nd Anti-Aircraft Artillery Group as a mixed unit and eliminating segregated armories.

A resident of Lumberton Township, New Jersey, he died on March 28, 1973, at Burlington County Memorial Hospital.

Political offices
Preceded by Harry G. Eaton	Speaker of the New Jersey General Assembly; 1925	Succeeded by Ralph W. Chandless
Preceded by Emerson L. Richards	President of the New Jersey Senate; 1934	Succeeded by Horace Griggs Prall
Preceded by A. Harry Moore	Governor of New Jersey; 1935 (acting)	Succeeded by Horace Griggs Prall
