= Lumberton, New Jersey =

Township in Burlington County, New Jersey, US

- Township
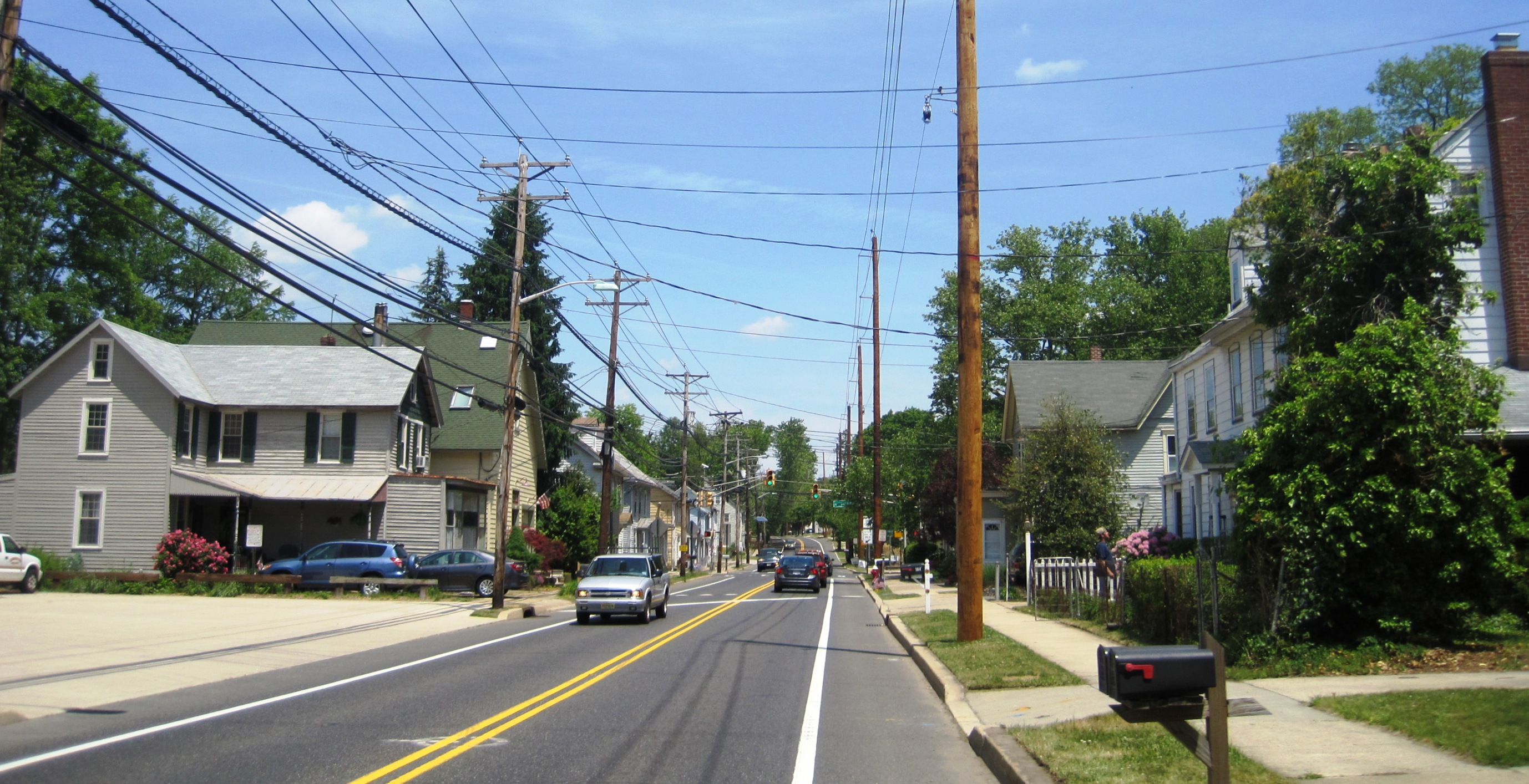
- Center of Lumberton

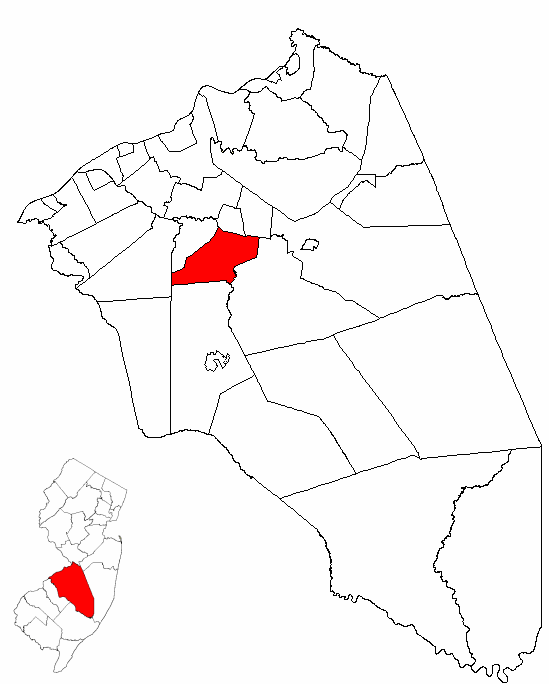
- Lumberton Township highlighted in Burlington County. Inset map: Burlington County highlighted in the State of New Jersey.

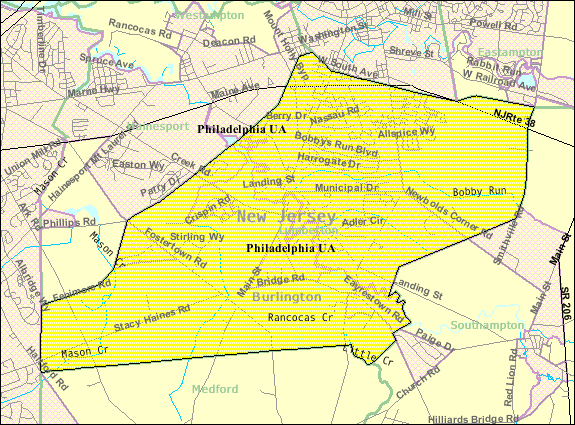
- Census Bureau map of Lumberton, New Jersey

- Location in Burlington County Location in New Jersey Location in the United States
- Coordinates: 39.958855°N 74.802478°W
- Country: United States
- State: New Jersey
- County: Burlington
- Incorporated: March 14, 1860

Government
  - Type: Township
  - Body: Township Committee
  - Mayor: Gina LaPlaca (D, term ends December 31, 2025)
  - Administrator: Meredith Riculfy
  - Municipal clerk: Bobbie Quinn

Area
  - Total: 13.02 sq mi (33.71 km^{2})
  - Land: 12.88 sq mi (33.37 km^{2})
  - Water: 0.13 sq mi (0.34 km^{2}) 1.01%
  - Rank: 183rd of 565 in state 18th of 40 in county
- Elevation: 10 ft (3.0 m)

Population (2020)
  - Total: 12,803
  - Estimate (2023): 12,886
  - Rank: 199th of 565 in state 12th of 40 in county
  - Density: 993.9/sq mi (383.7/km^{2})
  - Rank: 386th of 565 in state 24th of 40 in county
- Time zone: UTC−05:00 (Eastern (EST))
  - Summer (DST): UTC−04:00 (Eastern (EDT))
- ZIP Code: 08048
- Area code: 609
- FIPS code: 3400542060
- GNIS feature ID: 0882091
- Website: www.lumbertontwp.com

Lumberton is a township in Burlington County, in the U.S. state of New Jersey. The township, and all of Burlington County, is a part of the Philadelphia metropolitan area. As of the 2020 United States census, the township's population was 12,803, an increase of 244 (+1.9%) from the 2010 census count of 12,559, which in turn reflected an increase of 2,098 (+20.1%) from the 10,461 counted in the 2000 census.

Lumberton was incorporated as a township by an act of the New Jersey Legislature on March 14, 1860, from portions of Medford, Southampton and Eastampton townships. Portions of Lumberton were taken on March 12, 1924, to form Hainesport Township. Named for its early lumber industry, the township supplied Philadelphia with wood from harvested pitch pines.

In March 2007, Lumberton was identified as having the most active community of eBay buyers and sellers on a per-capita basis in the United States, with 46,000 items posted on the site over a three-week period by members based in the Lumberton ZIP code 08048.

== History ==
The Lenape Native Americans were the earliest inhabitants in what is now known as Lumberton. By the 17th century, European colonists began to settle the southwestern part of the township. They cleared wooded areas and established farms centered around Fostertown, an unincorporated community. Eayrestown was founded by Richard and Elizabeth Eayres in the late 1600s and became the first significant settlement in the area. It also served as the center of commerce, thanks to its sawmill. The village of Lumberton emerged from these two neighboring communities.

The history of some homes in Lumberton can be traced back to the times of slavery. The township's earliest settlers and their descendants held various views on slavery. These perspectives varied from supporting and tolerating it to passive and active opposition. Over the years, many locals became advocates for the abolition of slavery, first in New Jersey, and then across the entire nation.

One notable historical site is a house on Creek Road. Built in 1824 by D.B. Cole, a descendant of the founders of Old Colestown, New Jersey, this house played a crucial part in the Underground Railroad. The property's deed dates back to 1806 when the Coles bought it from the Moores of Moorestown. Charles Blockson's Hippocrene Guide to the Underground Railroad documents that a fake well in the backyard once served as a refuge for enslaved people. They would slide down into it to evade slave catchers as they made their way north toward Canada.

During the Cold War, the town served as a site for Project Nike. In the event of a nuclear war, Nike Ajax and Hercules missiles would have been deployed from bases in Lumberton and other neighboring bases. This strategy aimed to deter the Soviet Union from bombing the Philadelphia metropolitan area.

== Geography ==
According to the United States Census Bureau, the township had a total area of 13.01 square miles (33.71 km^{2}), including 12.88 square miles (33.37 km^{2}) of land and 0.13 square miles (0.34 km^{2}) of water (1.01%).

The township borders the Burlington County municipalities of Eastampton, Hainesport, Medford, Mount Holly, Mount Laurel, and Southampton.

Unincorporated communities, localities and place names located partially or completely within the township include Brown, Eayrestown, Fostertown and Newbolds Corner.

=== Climate ===
Climate data for Lumberton, New Jersey (South Jersey Regional Airport) 1991–2020 normals, extremes 1997–present
Month	Jan	Feb	Mar	Apr	May	Jun	Jul	Aug	Sep	Oct	Nov	Dec	Year
Record high °F (°C)	72 (22)	77 (25)	88 (31)	95 (35)	96 (36)	99 (37)	104 (40)	100 (38)	98 (37)	94 (34)	79 (26)	74 (23)	104 (40)
Mean daily maximum °F (°C)	41.0 (5.0)	44.0 (6.7)	52.0 (11.1)	63.5 (17.5)	73.3 (22.9)	81.9 (27.7)	87.0 (30.6)	84.8 (29.3)	77.9 (25.5)	66.3 (19.1)	55.6 (13.1)	45.6 (7.6)	64.4 (18.0)
Daily mean °F (°C)	32.8 (0.4)	34.8 (1.6)	42.5 (5.8)	52.6 (11.4)	62.2 (16.8)	71.5 (21.9)	76.6 (24.8)	74.4 (23.6)	67.2 (19.6)	55.9 (13.3)	45.7 (7.6)	37.4 (3.0)	54.5 (12.5)
Mean daily minimum °F (°C)	24.6 (−4.1)	25.7 (−3.5)	32.9 (0.5)	41.6 (5.3)	51.1 (10.6)	61.0 (16.1)	66.2 (19.0)	64.0 (17.8)	56.5 (13.6)	45.6 (7.6)	35.9 (2.2)	29.1 (−1.6)	44.5 (6.9)
Record low °F (°C)	−3 (−19)	−2 (−19)	2 (−17)	22 (−6)	34 (1)	42 (6)	43 (6)	44 (7)	37 (3)	27 (−3)	13 (−11)	7 (−14)	−3 (−19)
Average precipitation inches (mm)	2.97 (75)	2.57 (65)	3.83 (97)	3.37 (86)	2.95 (75)	3.73 (95)	5.19 (132)	4.40 (112)	3.39 (86)	3.67 (93)	2.98 (76)	3.74 (95)	42.79 (1,087)
Average precipitation days (≥ 0.01 in)	9.9	10.4	11.5	10.7	12.1	11.7	11.2	11.3	11.1	11.0	8.9	10.5	130.3
Source: NOAA

== Demographics ==
Historical population
Census	Pop.	Note	%±
1860	1,830		—
1870	1,718		−6.1%
1880	1,689		−1.7%
1890	1,799		6.5%
1900	1,624		−9.7%
1910	1,768		8.9%
1920	1,571		−11.1%
1930	905	*	−42.4%
1940	1,007		11.3%
1950	1,325		31.6%
1960	2,833		113.8%
1970	3,945		39.3%
1980	5,236		32.7%
1990	6,705		28.1%
2000	10,461		56.0%
2010	12,559		20.1%
2020	12,803		1.9%
2023 (est.)	12,886		0.6%
Population sources: 1860–2000 1860–1920; 1860–1870 1870 1880–1890; 1890–1910 1910–1930; 1940–2000 2000; 2010 2020 * = Lost territory in previous decade

=== 2010 census ===
The 2010 United States census counted 12,559 people, 4,540 households, and 3,237 families in the township. The population density was 971.7 per square mile (375.2/km^{2}). There were 4,719 housing units at an average density of 365.1 per square mile (141.0/km^{2}). The racial makeup was 70.99% (8,916) White, 18.93% (2,378) Black or African American, 0.24% (30) Native American, 4.71% (591) Asian, 0.04% (5) Pacific Islander, 1.55% (195) from other races, and 3.54% (444) from two or more races. Hispanic or Latino of any race were 5.86% (736) of the population.

Of the 4,540 households, 38.7% had children under the age of 18; 56.2% were married couples living together; 11.0% had a female householder with no husband present and 28.7% were non-families. Of all households, 24.0% were made up of individuals and 9.2% had someone living alone who was 65 years of age or older. The average household size was 2.73 and the average family size was 3.28.

27.4% of the population were under the age of 18, 7.8% from 18 to 24, 25.6% from 25 to 44, 28.7% from 45 to 64, and 10.4% who were 65 years of age or older. The median age was 38.5 years. For every 100 females, the population had 92.3 males. For every 100 females ages 18 and older there were 89.1 males.

The Census Bureau's 2006–2010 American Community Survey showed that (in 2010 inflation-adjusted dollars) median household income was $82,250 (with a margin of error of +/− $10,344) and the median family income was $102,276 (+/− $7,854). Males had a median income of $71,475 (+/− $6,369) versus $54,452 (+/− $5,969) for females. The per capita income for the borough was $35,294 (+/− $1,882). About 5.6% of families and 5.0% of the population were below the poverty line, including 6.3% of those under age 18 and 1.3% of those age 65 or over.

=== 2000 census ===
As of the 2000 United States census there were 10,461 people, 3,930 households, and 2,731 families residing in the township. The population density was 813.0 inhabitants per square mile (313.9/km^{2}). There were 4,080 housing units at an average density of 317.1 per square mile (122.4/km^{2}). The racial makeup of the township was 78.31% White, 13.75% African American, 0.23% Native American, 3.38% Asian, 0.02% Pacific Islander, 1.90% from other races, and 2.41% from two or more races. Hispanic or Latino of any race were 5.15% of the population.

There were 3,930 households, out of which 39.2% had children under the age of 18 living with them, 54.9% were married couples living together, 10.9% had a female householder with no husband present, and 30.5% were non-families. 25.1% of all households were made up of individuals, and 9.1% had someone living alone who was 65 years of age or older. The average household size was 2.61 and the average family size was 3.17.

In the township the population was spread out, with 28.1% under the age of 18, 6.2% from 18 to 24, 35.6% from 25 to 44, 19.0% from 45 to 64, and 11.1% who were 65 years of age or older. The median age was 36 years. For every 100 females, there were 91.2 males. For every 100 females age 18 and over, there were 87.6 males.

The median income for a household in the township was $60,571, and the median income for a family was $70,329. Males had a median income of $46,045 versus $32,431 for females. The per capita income for the township was $25,789. About 2.6% of families and 3.8% of the population were below the poverty line, including 3.2% of those under age 18 and 5.9% of those age 65 or over.

== Government ==
=== Local government ===
Lumberton is governed under the Township form of New Jersey municipal government, one of 141 (of the 564) municipalities statewide that use this form, the second-most commonly used form of government in the state. The Township Committee is comprised of five members, who are elected directly by the voters at-large in partisan elections to serve three-year terms of office on a staggered basis, with either one or two seats coming up for election each year as part of the November general election in a three-year cycle. At an annual reorganization meeting, the Township Committee selects one of its members to serve as Mayor and another as Deputy Mayor.

As of 2023, members of the Lumberton Township Committee are Mayor Terrance Benson (D, terms on committee and as mayor ends December 31, 2023), Deputy Mayor Gina LaPlaca (D, term on committee and as deputy mayor ends 2023), Lori Faye (D, 2025), Kendra Hatfield (D, 2024) and Robert Rodriguez (D, 2024).

In 2020 Gina LaPlaca and Terrance Benson were elected to township committee, giving Democrats a 5-0 majority for the first time in Lumberton history. LaPlaca and Benson received a record number of votes for a municipal candidate.

=== Federal, state and county representation ===
Lumberton is located in the 3rd Congressional District and is part of New Jersey's 8th state legislative district.

For the 119th United States Congress, New Jersey's 3rd congressional district is currently represented Herb Conaway (D, Delran Township). New Jersey is represented in the United States Senate by Democrats Cory Booker (Newark, term ends 2027) and Andy Kim (Moorestown, term ends 2031).

For the 2026–2027 session, the 8th legislative district of the New Jersey Legislature is represented in the New Jersey Senate by Latham Tiver (R, Southampton Township) and in the General Assembly by Anthony Angelozzi (D, Hammonton) and Andrea Katz (D, Chesterfield Township).

Burlington County is governed by a Board of County Commissioners comprised of five members who are chosen at-large in partisan elections to serve three-year terms of office on a staggered basis, with either one or two seats coming up for election each year; at an annual reorganization meeting, the board selects a director and deputy director from among its members to serve a one-year term. As of 2026, Burlington County's Commissioners are: Director Felicia Hopson (D, Willingboro Township, term as commissioner ends December 31, 2027; term as director ends 2026), Deputy Director Allison Eckel (D, Medford, term as commissioner ends 2028; term as deputy director ends 2026), Randy Brolo (D, Lumberton, 2026; elected to an unexpired term), Tyler Burrell (D, Delran Township, 2027) and Tom Pullion (D, Edgewater Park, 2026).

Burlington County's constitutional officers are Clerk Joanne Schwartz (D, Southampton Township, 2028), Sheriff James H. Kostoplis (D, Bordentown, 2028) and Surrogate Brian J. Carlin (D, Burlington Township, 2026).

=== Politics ===
United States presidential election results for Lumberton 2024 2020 2016 2012 2008 2004
Year	Republican		Democratic		Third party(ies)	
Year	No.	%	No.	%	No.	%
2024	2,411	37.88%	3,850	60.50%	103	1.62%
2020	2,749	36.50%	4,674	62.06%	109	1.45%
2016	2,351	38.12%	3,573	57.93%	244	3.96%
2012	2,504	41.29%	3,508	57.84%	53	0.87%
2008	2,476	39.40%	3,756	59.76%	53	0.84%
2004	2,637	47.06%	2,924	52.19%	42	0.75%

As of March 2011, there were a total of 7,481 registered voters in Lumberton, of which 2,406 (32.2% vs. 33.3% countywide) were registered as Democrats, 1,827 (24.4% vs. 23.9%) were registered as Republicans and 3,241 (43.3% vs. 42.8%) were registered as Unaffiliated. There were 7 voters registered as Libertarians or Greens. Among the township's 2010 Census population, 59.6% (vs. 61.7% in Burlington County) were registered to vote, including 82.1% of those ages 18 and over (vs. 80.3% countywide).

In the 2012 presidential election, Democrat Barack Obama received 3,508 votes here (57.4% vs. 58.1% countywide), ahead of Republican Mitt Romney with 2,504 votes (41.0% vs. 40.2%) and other candidates with 53 votes (0.9% vs. 1.0%), among the 6,108 ballots cast by the township's 7,956 registered voters, for a turnout of 76.8% (vs. 74.5% in Burlington County). In the 2008 presidential election, Democrat Barack Obama received 3,756 votes here (59.5% vs. 58.4% countywide), ahead of Republican John McCain with 2,476 votes (39.2% vs. 39.9%) and other candidates with 53 votes (0.8% vs. 1.0%), among the 6,315 ballots cast by the township's 7,661 registered voters, for a turnout of 82.4% (vs. 80.0% in Burlington County). In the 2004 presidential election, Democrat John Kerry received 2,924 votes here (52.1% vs. 52.9% countywide), ahead of Republican George W. Bush with 2,637 votes (46.9% vs. 46.0%) and other candidates with 42 votes (0.7% vs. 0.8%), among the 5,617 ballots cast by the township's 6,832 registered voters, for a turnout of 82.2% (vs. 78.8% in the whole county).

Gubernatorial election results for Lumberton
Year	Republican		Democratic		Third party(ies)	
Year	No.	%	No.	%	No.	%
2025	1,989	36.72%	3,402	62.80%	26	0.48%
2021	1,928	43.00%	2,539	56.62%	17	0.38%
2017	1,446	40.86%	2,025	57.22%	68	1.92%
2013	2,173	63.00%	1,235	35.81%	41	1.19%
2009	1,847	49.88%	1,650	44.56%	206	5.56%
2005	1,701	49.87%	1,568	45.97%	142	4.16%

In the 2013 gubernatorial election, Republican Chris Christie received 2,173 votes here (62.2% vs. 61.4% countywide), ahead of Democrat Barbara Buono with 1,235 votes (35.4% vs. 35.8%) and other candidates with 41 votes (1.2% vs. 1.2%), among the 3,493 ballots cast by the township's 7,917 registered voters, yielding a 44.1% turnout (vs. 44.5% in the county). In the 2009 gubernatorial election, Republican Chris Christie received 1,847 votes here (49.6% vs. 47.7% countywide), ahead of Democrat Jon Corzine with 1,650 votes (44.3% vs. 44.5%), Independent Chris Daggett with 174 votes (4.7% vs. 4.8%) and other candidates with 32 votes (0.9% vs. 1.2%), among the 3,724 ballots cast by the township's 7,656 registered voters, yielding a 48.6% turnout (vs. 44.9% in the county).

United States Senate election results for Lumberton1
Year	Republican		Democratic		Third party(ies)	
Year	No.	%	No.	%	No.	%
2024	2,140	34.56%	3,937	63.57%	116	1.87%
2018	2,276	42.31%	2,795	51.96%	308	5.73%
2012	2,391	41.27%	3,356	57.92%	47	0.81%
2006	1,631	50.18%	1,571	48.34%	48	1.48%

United States Senate election results for Lumberton2
Year	Republican		Democratic		Third party(ies)	
Year	No.	%	No.	%	No.	%
2020	2,791	37.51%	4,565	61.36%	84	1.13%
2014	1,417	43.76%	1,792	55.34%	29	0.90%
2013	922	43.72%	1,170	55.48%	17	0.81%
2008	2,445	42.12%	3,286	56.61%	74	1.27%

== Education ==
For pre-kindergarten through eighth grade, public school students attend the Lumberton Township School District. As of the 2021–22 school year, the district, comprised of three schools, had an enrollment of 1,141 students and 96.8 classroom teachers (on an FTE basis), for a student–teacher ratio of 11.8:1. Schools in the district (with 2021–22 enrollment data from the National Center for Education Statistics) are Ashbrook Elementary School with 398 students in grades PreK-2, Bobby's Run School with 328 students in grades 3-5 and Lumberton Middle School with 357 students in grades 6-8. In 2018, the district decided to close the Florence L. Walther School, which had served students in Kindergarten and first grade, at the end of the 2019-20 school year and reconfigure the grades assigned to the three remaining facilities.

For ninth through twelfth grades, public school students attend the Rancocas Valley Regional High School, a comprehensive regional public high school serving students from five communities encompassing approximately 40 square miles (100 km^{2}) and comprised of the communities of Eastampton Township, Hainesport Township, Lumberton Township, Mount Holly and Westampton. As of the 2021–22 school year, the high school had an enrollment of 2,048 students and 140.3 classroom teachers (on an FTE basis), for a student–teacher ratio of 14.6:1. The school is located in Mount Holly Township. The high school district's board of education has nine members who are elected directly by voters to serve three-year terms of office on a staggered basis, with three seats up for election each year as part of the November general election. Seats on the board are allocated based on the population of the five constituent municipalities, with three seats assigned to Lumberton Township.

Students from Lumberton Township, and from all of Burlington County, are eligible to attend the Burlington County Institute of Technology, a countywide public school district that serves the vocational and technical education needs of students at the high school and post-secondary level at its campuses in Medford and Westampton.

== Transportation ==
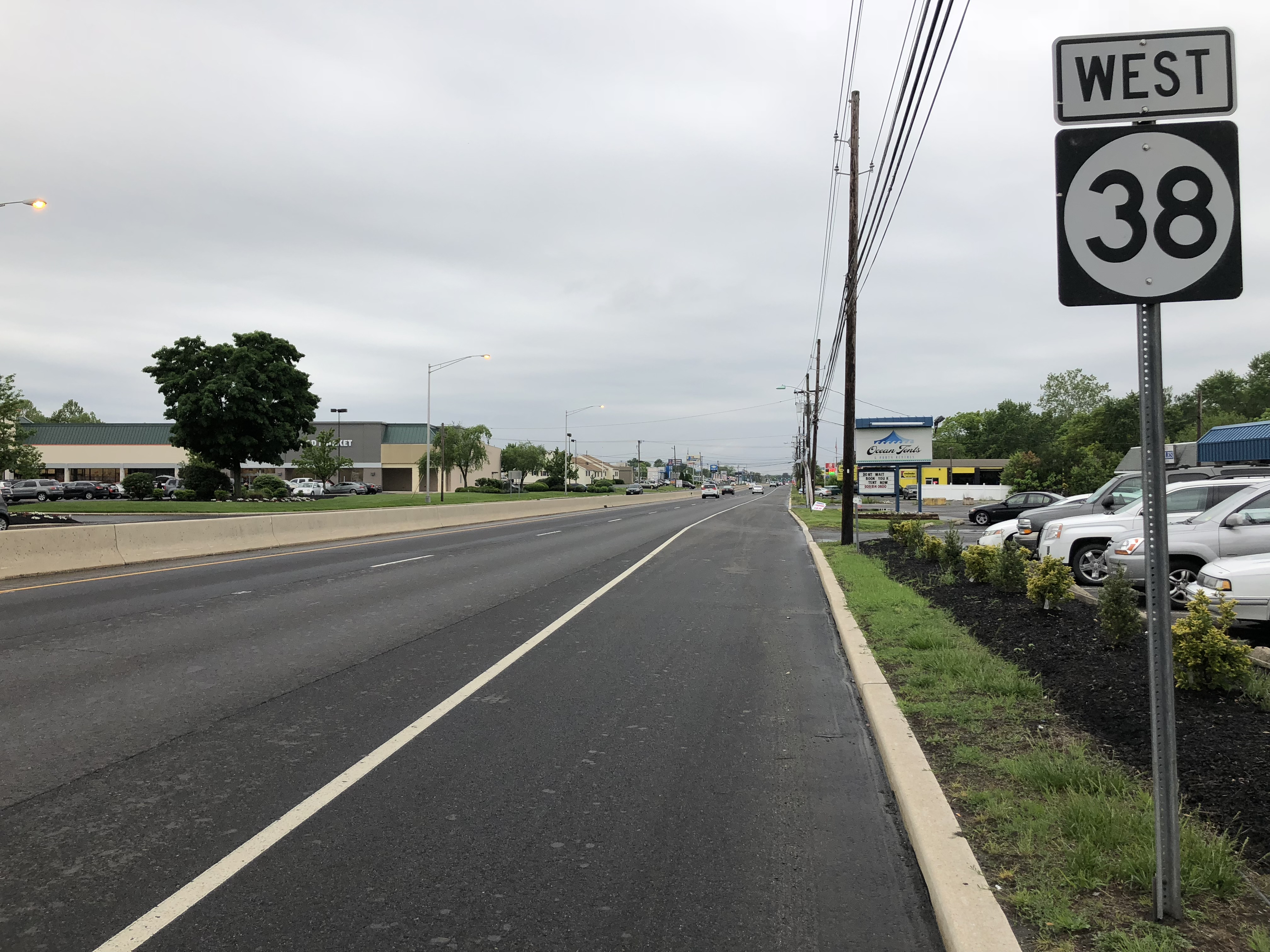
Route 38 in Lumberton

=== Roads and highways ===
As of July 2015, Lumberton had a total of 64.82 miles (104.32 km) of roadways, of which 45.61 miles (73.40 km) were maintained by the municipality, 17.11 miles (27.54 km) by Burlington County and 2.10 miles (3.38 km) by the New Jersey Department of Transportation.

Route 38 is the main east–west highway and County Route 541 is the main north–south road through the township.

=== Public transportation ===
NJ Transit provides bus service in Lumberton on the 317 route between Asbury Park and Philadelphia, and on the 413 route between Camden and Burlington.

BurLink bus service is offered on the B1 route between Beverly and Pemberton.

=== Airport ===
The Flying W Airport is located 1-mile (1.6 km) southwest of the central business district.

== Notable people ==
People who were born in, residents of, or otherwise closely associated with Lumberton include:

- Pat Delany, former mayor of Lumberton who served in the New Jersey General Assembly from 2010 until his resignation in 2011 after disclosure that his wife had sent emails critical of Democratic candidate Carl Lewis
- Ryan Finley (born 1991), professional soccer player who plays as a forward for the Columbus Crew in Major League Soccer
- Eric Lofton (born 1993), offensive lineman for the Edmonton Football Team of the Canadian Football League
- Andrew Macurdy, politician who has represented the 21st Legislative District in the New Jersey General Assembly since January 2026
- Tyler Phillips (born 1997), pitcher for the Miami Marlins
- Jack Pierce (born 1962), Olympic bronze medalist in the 100-meter high hurdles at the 1992 Olympic Games.
- Clifford Ross Powell (1893–1973), politician who served as Acting Governor of New Jersey in 1935
- Bobby Sanguinetti (born 1988), professional ice hockey defenseman who plays for HC Lugano in the National League
