= Horace Griggs Prall =

American politician

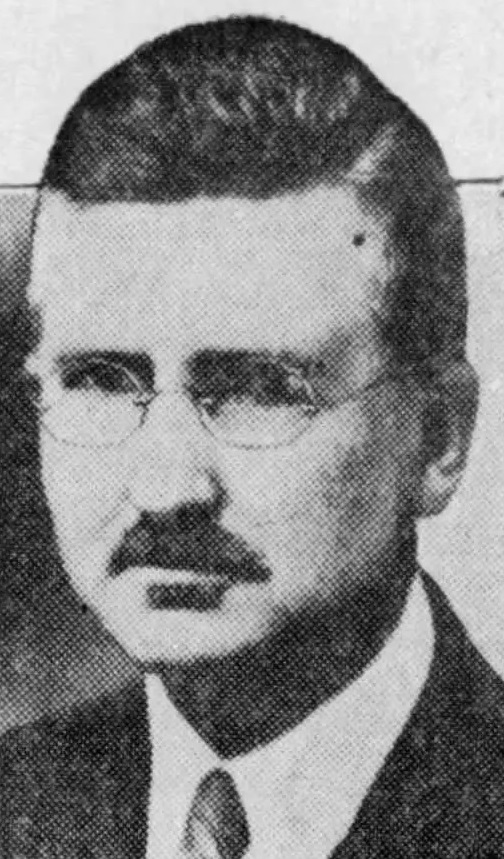
- Asbury Park Press, November 21, 1934

Acting Governor of New Jersey
- In office January 8, 1935 – January 15, 1935
- Preceded by: Clifford R. Powell (acting)
- Succeeded by: Harold G. Hoffman

Member of the New Jersey Senate from Hunterdon County
- In office 1928–1937
- Preceded by: David H. Agans
- Succeeded by: Arthur F. Foran

Member of the New Jersey General Assembly
- In office 1927–1928

Personal details
- Born: March 6, 1881 Amwell, New Jersey, U.S.
- Died: April 23, 1951 (aged 70) Lambertville, New Jersey, U.S.
- Party: Republican
- Education: Harvard University; New York University School of Law

Horace Griggs Prall (March 6, 1881 – April 23, 1951) was a New Jersey attorney and Republican politician. He served for a number of years as a state legislator and a short term as acting governor of New Jersey in 1935.

Prall was born near Ringoes in East Amwell Township, New Jersey. He attended Harvard University (1906) and New York University School of Law (LL.B. 1908). After almost two decades of practicing law, Prall was elected to the legislature, first to the Assembly (1927–28), then to the State Senate (1928–36), serving as president of that body in his last two years of tenure. After the resignation of Governor A. Harry Moore, Prall served as Acting Governor for a brief period (January 3, 1935 – January 15, 1935). After completing his last term as a Senator, Prall became a judge on the Court of Common Pleas.

A resident of Lambertville, New Jersey, he died of a heart attack at the age of 70 on April 23, 1951, in Trenton, New Jersey.

== Sources ==
- Biography from the National Governors Association

Political offices
Preceded by Clifford Ross Powell	Governor of New Jersey; 1935 (acting)	Succeeded by Harold G. Hoffman
Preceded by Clifford Ross Powell	President of the New Jersey Senate; 1935	Succeeded by John C. Barbour
