= Arthur F. Foran =

American politician

President of the New Jersey Senate
- In office 1940–1940
- Preceded by: Robert C. Hendrickson
- Succeeded by: I. Grant Scott

Member of the New Jersey Senate from Hunterdon County
- In office 1937–1942
- Preceded by: Horace G. Prall
- Succeeded by: Wesley Lance

Personal details
- Born: September 23, 1882 Port Chester, New York, U.S.
- Died: December 15, 1961 (aged 79) Raritan, New Jersey, U.S.
- Party: Republican

Arthur Francis Foran (September 23, 1882 – December 15, 1961) was an American Republican Party politician from New Jersey. He served in the New Jersey Senate where he was Senate President.

== Biography ==
Foran was born in Port Chester, New York and went to live in Flemington, New Jersey with his parents at the age of 11. He attended Villanova University and then worked for his father's company, the Foran Foundry and Manufacturing Company of Flemington. He also joined the National Guard and was later commissioned as an officer.

Foran was elected Mayor of Flemington in 1916 and also worked that year on the campaign of Walter Evans Edge for Governor of New Jersey. When Edge took office the following year, Foran came to Trenton to serve as his aide. During World War I he pursued an active military career and achieved the rank of Colonel in the United States Army.

In 1922 Foran was appointed by Warren G. Harding as Controller of Customs of the Port of New York and was reappointed to this position by Calvin Coolidge in 1926. The Anti-Saloon League opposed his reappointment in 1930, claiming that he had been lax in upholding Prohibition laws by allowing the passage of liquid cargoes through customs. After being cleared of these charges, he was reappointed and served in the post until 1933. He was then appointed chairman of the New Jersey State Highway Commission.

Foran was elected to the New Jersey Senate from Hunterdon County in 1936. He was named Senate Majority Leader in 1939 and Senate President in 1940. He resigned the following year to become director of the New Jersey Office of Milk Industry, regulating state milk prices, a position he held until 1951. When he retired from the Senate his seat was won by Wesley Lance.

In 1940, Foran was flying in a New Jersey National Guard plane and crashed in a swamp near New Orleans Airport. He broke his leg and sustained other injuries, requiring the use of crutches or a cane from then on.

Foran married Elizabeth Fisher around 1909 and had five sons: John Nicholas 'Dick' Foran (1910–1979), Arthur F. Foran, Jr. (1911–1967), James F. Foran (1915–1998), Walter E. Foran (1919–1986), and William F. Foran (1927–1984). Dick Foran was a famous B-movie actor, while Walter E. Foran followed in his father's footsteps in the New Jersey Senate. Foran died at the age of 79 at Hunterdon Medical Center in Raritan, New Jersey on December 15, 1961.

Political offices
Preceded by Robert C. Hendrickson	President of the New Jersey Senate; 1940	Succeeded by I. Grant Scott
