= 44th Indiana Infantry Regiment =

44th Indiana Infantry
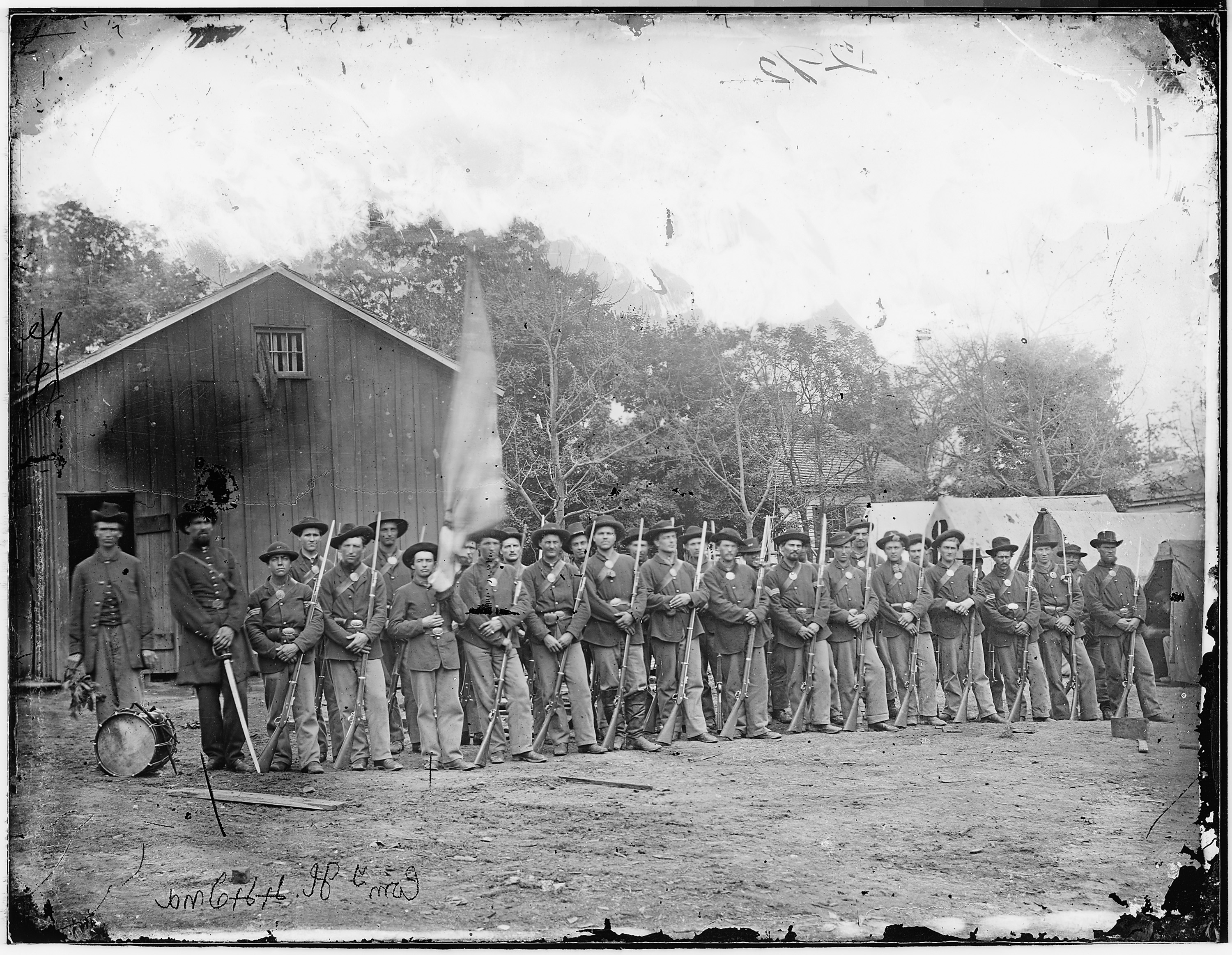
- Company H of the 44th Indiana Infantry taken in Chattanooga, Tennessee in May, 1864.
- Active: November 1861 - September 1865
- Country: United States of America
- Allegiance: Union Army
- Branch: Army
- Type: Infantry
- Engagements: Battle of Fort Donelson; Battle of Shiloh; Siege of Corinth; Battle of Perryville; Battle of Stones River; Battle of Chickamauga; Battle of Missionary Ridge

Commanders
- Colonel of the Regiment: Col. Hugh B. Reed

The 44th Indiana Infantry, an American Civil War regiment, was organized at Fort Wayne, Indiana, on October 24, 1861, with Hugh B. Reed, a Fort Wayne druggist, as colonel, and officially mustered in on November 22, 1861. It was composed mostly of volunteers from what was then Indiana's Tenth Congressional District in the northeastern part of the state. In December, the regiment left for Henderson, Kentucky. It camped at Calhoun, Kentucky, until February 1862, when it moved to Fort Henry, Tennessee, then to Fort Donelson, Tennessee, where it participated in the siege of the fort, taking heavy casualties there.

The regiment was engaged both days, April 6–7, 1862, at the Battle of Shiloh, where it suffered 33 killed and 177 wounded. It participated in the Siege of Corinth, Mississippi, and fought at Stones River, Chickamauga and Missionary Ridge. It was assigned provost (police) duty at Chattanooga, Tennessee, before being mustered out on September 14, 1865.

Frederick Dyer (see references) reports that the regiment's total combat fatalities were four officers and 76 enlisted men killed or mortally wounded, and nine officers and 220 enlisted men who died of disease. The Indiana Chickamauga Commission (see references), however, reports the 44th's casualties as 350 killed and wounded in combat, and another 58 dead from disease.

One of the regiment's early casualties was William H. Cuppy, captain of Company E, paternal uncle of humorist Will Cuppy. Severely wounded at Fort Donelson, he was sent home to South Whitley, Indiana, where he was cared for by his mother and sister until he died of his injuries in July 1862 at age 26.

== Companies ==
Below is a brief outline of the companies consisting of the 44th Indiana Infantry Regiment. This identifies the First Sergeants and Sergeants of each Company. One of the links in the External Links section below leads to a PDF that includes all soldiers for each company in its entirety, including those unassigned to a company but still in the 44th.

=== Company "A" ===
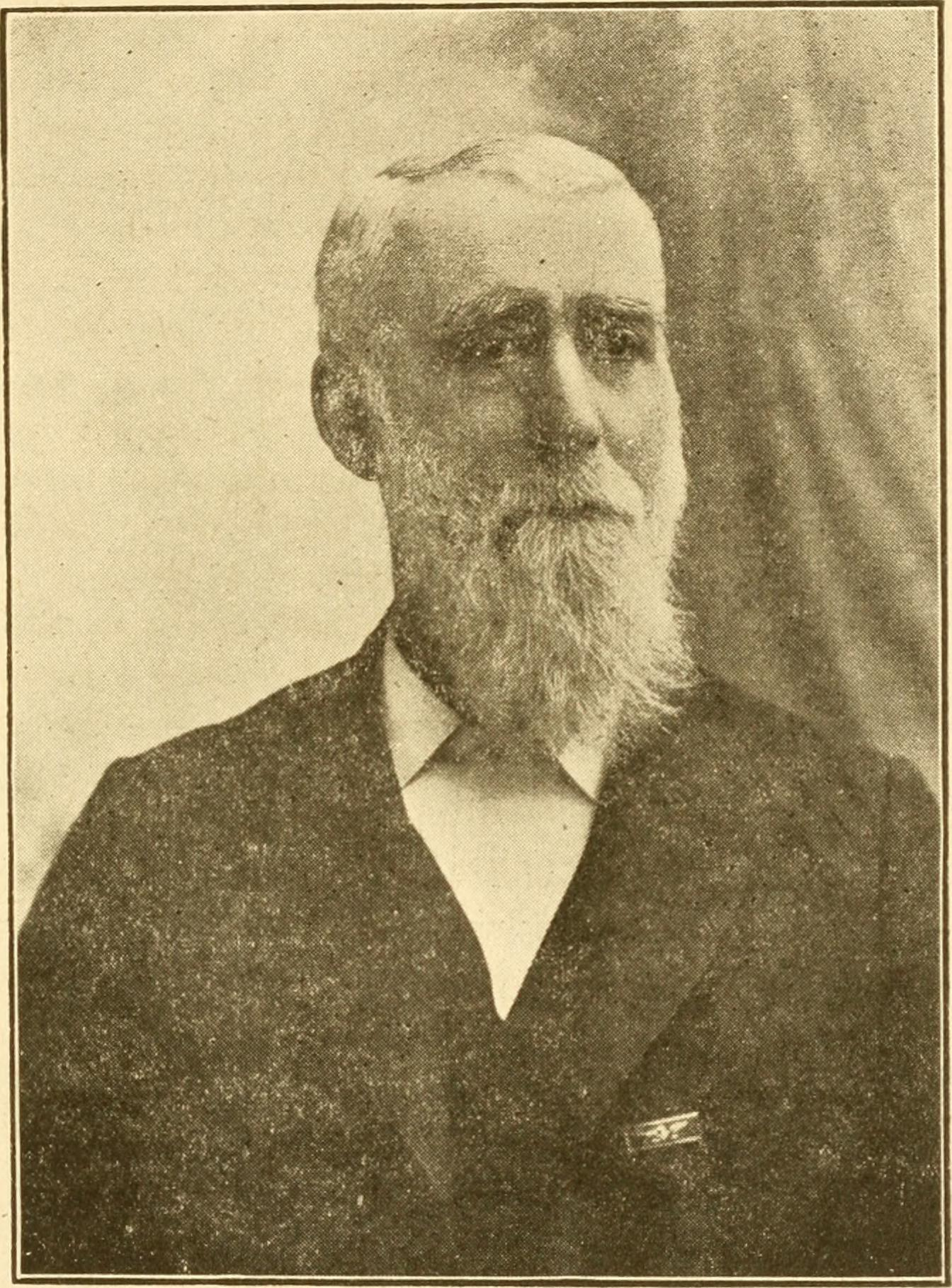
M. B. Butler, 20th century photo

- First Sergeant
  - Marion B. Butler
  - Seymour Pugh Snyder
- Sergeants
  - John Ulam
  - William W. Wright
  - James H. Merriman
  - Joseph Milnes

=== Company "B" ===
- First Sergeant
  - James S. Getty
- Sergeants
  - George R. Murray
  - William McNeal
  - Charles H. Ward
  - William Eddy

=== Company "C" ===
- First Sergeant
  - Caleb Carman
- Sergeants
  - Sedgewick Livingston
  - John H. Strong
  - William Riley
  - J. R. McCool

=== Company "D" ===
- First Sergeant
  - Thomas C. Moffett
- Sergeants
  - David K. Stoer
  - George Shell
  - Lafayette Perkins
  - Owen T. James

=== Company "E" ===
- First Sergeant
  - George Sickafoose
- Sergeants
  - Jerome F. Combs
  - William Hilderbrand
  - James Compton
  - Henry Cray

=== Company "F" ===
- First Sergeant
  - Solomon Delong
- Sergeants
  - John Gunsunhouser
  - James H. Obell
  - Wilson Nichols
  - Nathan P. Fuller

=== Company "G" ===
- First Sergeant
  - B. F. Rawso
- Sergeants
  - Phinneus M. Carey
  - Lyman Blowers
  - Neal Ruthvan
  - Daniel Johnson
- Private
  - Joseph Forest

=== Company "H" ===
- First Sergeant
  - Hiram F. King
- Sergeants
  - David M. Hart
  - John B. Rowe
  - Daniel Rowe
  - George M. Fish
- Private
  - William Nelson Crow Wounded 4/6/1862 Shiloh, TN

=== Company "I" ===
- First Sergeant
  - Nelson Mansfield
- Sergeants
  - David S. Belknap
  - Robert M. Wilmore
  - Frank Launners
  - Levi C. Vinson
- Privates
  - William C. Welton
  - Cyrus Klapp

=== Company "K" ===
- First Sergeant
  - Norris S. Bennet
- Sergeants
  - George W. Gordon
  - Moses B. Willis
  - Eugene S. Aldrich
  - Samuel H. Elliott

== See also ==
- List of Indiana Civil War regiments
- Indiana in the Civil War
