= I. Grant Scott =

American politician

Mayor of Cape May
- In office 1941–1948

73rd President of the New Jersey Senate
- In office 1941–1942
- Preceded by: Arthur F. Foran
- Succeeded by: George H. Stanger

Member of the New Jersey Senate from Cape May County
- In office 1937–1944
- Preceded by: William C. Hunt
- Succeeded by: George A. Redding

Member of the New Jersey General Assembly from the Cape May district
- In office 1936–1937
- Preceded by: Walter P. Taylor
- Succeeded by: John E. Boswell

Personal details
- Born: May 3, 1897 Trenton, New Jersey, U.S.
- Died: November 17, 1964 (aged 67) Cape May, New Jersey, U.S.
- Party: Republican

I. Grant Scott (May 3, 1897 – November 17, 1964) was an American politician who served in the New Jersey General Assembly from 1936 to 1937 and in the New Jersey Senate from 1937 to 1944. He also served as the Mayor of Cape May from 1941 to 1948.

He died of a heart attack on November 17, 1964, in Cape May, New Jersey at age 67.

Political offices
Preceded by Arthur F. Foran	President of the New Jersey Senate; 1941-1942	Succeeded by George H. Stanger
