= Wesley Lance =

American politician (1908–2007)

President of the New Jersey Senate
- In office 1959–1959
- Preceded by: Richard R. Stout
- Succeeded by: George B. Harper

Member of the New Jersey Senate from Hunterdon County
- In office 1942–1944
- Preceded by: Arthur F. Foran
- Succeeded by: Samuel L. Bodine
- In office 1954–1962
- Preceded by: Samuel L. Bodine
- Succeeded by: Raymond Bowkley

Personal details
- Born: November 21, 1908 Glen Gardner, New Jersey, U.S.
- Died: August 25, 2007 (aged 98) Clinton, New Jersey, U.S.
- Party: Republican
- Spouse(s): Anne Anderson (m. 1951, d. 1965); Jeannette Bonnell Gill (m. 1970, d. 2002)
- Children: Leonard and James
- Education: Lafayette College; Harvard Law School

Wesley Leonard Lance (November 21, 1908 – August 25, 2007) was an American Republican Party politician, who served as a member of both the New Jersey General Assembly and the New Jersey Senate.

== Life and career ==
Lance was born and raised in Glen Gardner, New Jersey, the son of Florence S. (née Smith) and Leonard Arville Lance. He attended Lafayette College and Harvard Law School. He was first elected to the Assembly from Hunterdon County in 1937, and re-elected in 1938, 1939 and 1940, and to the Senate in 1941.

Lance was a delegate to the 1947 constitutional convention that established the current New Jersey State Constitution, and to the 1966 convention that established the current New Jersey Legislature with 40 senators and 80 assemblymembers. He served in the Senate from 1942 to 1943, succeeding Arthur F. Foran, and stepped down to enter the United States Navy. He was reelected to the Senate in 1954 and served until 1962. He was Senate President during the 1959 term.

Lance was a practicing lawyer for 70 years, including 64 years as the municipal attorney of Lebanon Township, New Jersey, and several years for Hunterdon County Counsel.

== Family ==
He married, in 1951 to Anne Anderson, then the Director of the Hunterdon County Welfare Board. She died in 1965. He was married from 1970 until her death in 2002 to Jeannette Bonnell Gill, widow of John F. Gill, chief pilot of Eastern Airlines.

One of his sons, Leonard Lance, served in the Assembly from 1992 to 2002, in the New Jersey Senate from 2002 to 2009, and in the House of Representatives beginning in 2009. James Lance, Leonard's twin brother, is an attorney practicing in Clinton, New Jersey.

== Death ==
Wesley Lance died at age 98, in Clinton, New Jersey. He was survived by both sons, a stepdaughter, a stepson, and four grandchildren. His memorial service was held on August 30, 2007, at the Spruce Run Evangelical Lutheran Zion Church. His children were raised in their mother's Roman Catholic faith.

Political offices
Preceded by Richard R. Stout	President of the New Jersey Senate; 1959	Succeeded by George B. Harper
