= Howard Eastwood =

American judge (1884–1976)

Associate Justice of the Supreme Court of New Jersey
- In office 1946–1948
- Succeeded by: Constitution of 1947

Member of the New Jersey State Senate from Burlington County
- In office 1940–1944
- Preceded by: Clifford R. Powell
- Succeeded by: Arthur W. Lewis

Personal details
- Born: November 24, 1884
- Died: January 12, 1976 (aged 91)

Howard Eastwood (November 24, 1884 – January 12, 1976) was a justice of the New Jersey Supreme Court from 1946 to 1948.

He was a member of the New Jersey Senate from Burlington County (1940–1944) serving as president in 1944 before resigning.

He was New Jersey Circuit judge from 1944 to 1946 and Associate Justice of New Jersey Supreme Court from 1946 to 1948.

His spouse was Rebecca Ivins Harmer Eastwood.

Eastwood is buried at Odd Fellows Cemetery and Mausoleum in Burlington, New Jersey.

== See also ==
- List of justices of the Supreme Court of New Jersey
- New Jersey Court of Errors and Appeals
- Courts of New Jersey
