= Hugh B. Reed =

American pharmacist and Civil War veteran

Colonel Hugh B. Reed
- Born: Hugh Burgess Reed; March 18, 1818; Zanesville, Ohio
- Died: April 29, 1890 (aged 72); Somerset, New Jersey
- Burial place: Lindenwood Cemetery
- Spouse: Anne Eliza Thompson
- Military career
- Allegiance: United States of America
- Branch: Union Army
- Service years: 1861–1863
- Rank: Colonel
- Unit: 44th Indiana Infantry Regiment
- Commands: 44th Indiana Infantry Regiment
- Conflicts: American Civil War; Battle of Fort Donelson; Battle of Shiloh; Siege of Corinth; Battle of Perryville; Battle of Stones River; Battle of Chickamauga; Battle of Missionary Ridge
- Other work: Pharmacist

Hugh Burgess Reed (March 18, 1818 – April 29, 1890) was an early settler of Fort Wayne, Indiana, a pharmacist, military officer, and the Colonel of the 44th Indiana Infantry Regiment during the American Civil War.

== Early life ==
Reed was born in Zanesville, Ohio, March 18, 1818, to Arthur Reed (1785–1859) and Martha Irvin (1787–1856). Reed married Anne Eliza Thompson (1835–1911) in 1853, together the Reed's had 5 children.

He attended Ohio Medical College, but chose not to enter the field of medicine. Reed was an early settler and business owner in Fort Wayne, Indiana. Reed owned and operated the first pharmacy in Fort Wayne on "the landing" at the corner of Columbia Street and Calhoun Street in modern-day downtown Fort Wayne.

== Military career ==
At the outbreak of the American Civil War, Reed acted as the first Commandant of Camp Allen located in Fort Wayne. From 1861 to 1864 Camp Allen acted as the mustering point for various Indiana infantry regiments during the course of the war including; 30th Indiana Infantry Regiment, the 44th Indiana, the 74th Indiana, the 88th Indiana, the 100th Indiana, and the 11th Independent Battery Indiana Light Artillery.

Reed was responsible for the organization and mustering of the 44th Indiana Infantry Regiment which fell under the Indiana's 10th congressional district. The 44th Indiana was organized in Fort Wayne and mustered into federal service from mid-October to mid-November 1861. Reed was commissioned with the rank of Colonel on September 27, 1861, and made the commanding officer of the regiment. Reed was not mustered into the regiment until November 26, 1861. Although a respected man Reed is described by local Fort Wayne historian and researcher Margaret Hobson as "a little bit of a hot head".

Reed was present for the majority of the battles which the 44th Indiana were engaged in, most notably in the Battle of Fort Donelson and the Battle of Shiloh. Reed resigned his officers commission with the Union Army in July 1862 due to an illness with malaria, however, Reed was not official stricken from the muster rolls of the regiment until November 26, 1863, following the Battle of Missionary Ridge according to the official roster of the 44th Indiana. In 1865 Governor of Indiana Oliver P. Morton approved Reed for the Brevet rank of Brigadier General for his critical service in Indiana's time of need and for raising the 44th Indiana.

== Later life and death ==
Reed returned to Fort Wayne following the war but did not continue to work as a pharmacist as the field had become too competitive while he was at war. In 1865, Reed and his wife later moved to Pennington, New Jersey, where they lived before moving to the Somerset section of Franklin Township, Somerset County, New Jersey. Reed died on April 25, 1890, due to paralysis. Reed is buried in the Lindenwood Cemetery along with his wife Anne and two of his children; Alice (1855–1860) and Louis (1859–1933).
