= South Jersey Regional Airport =

Airport in the United States

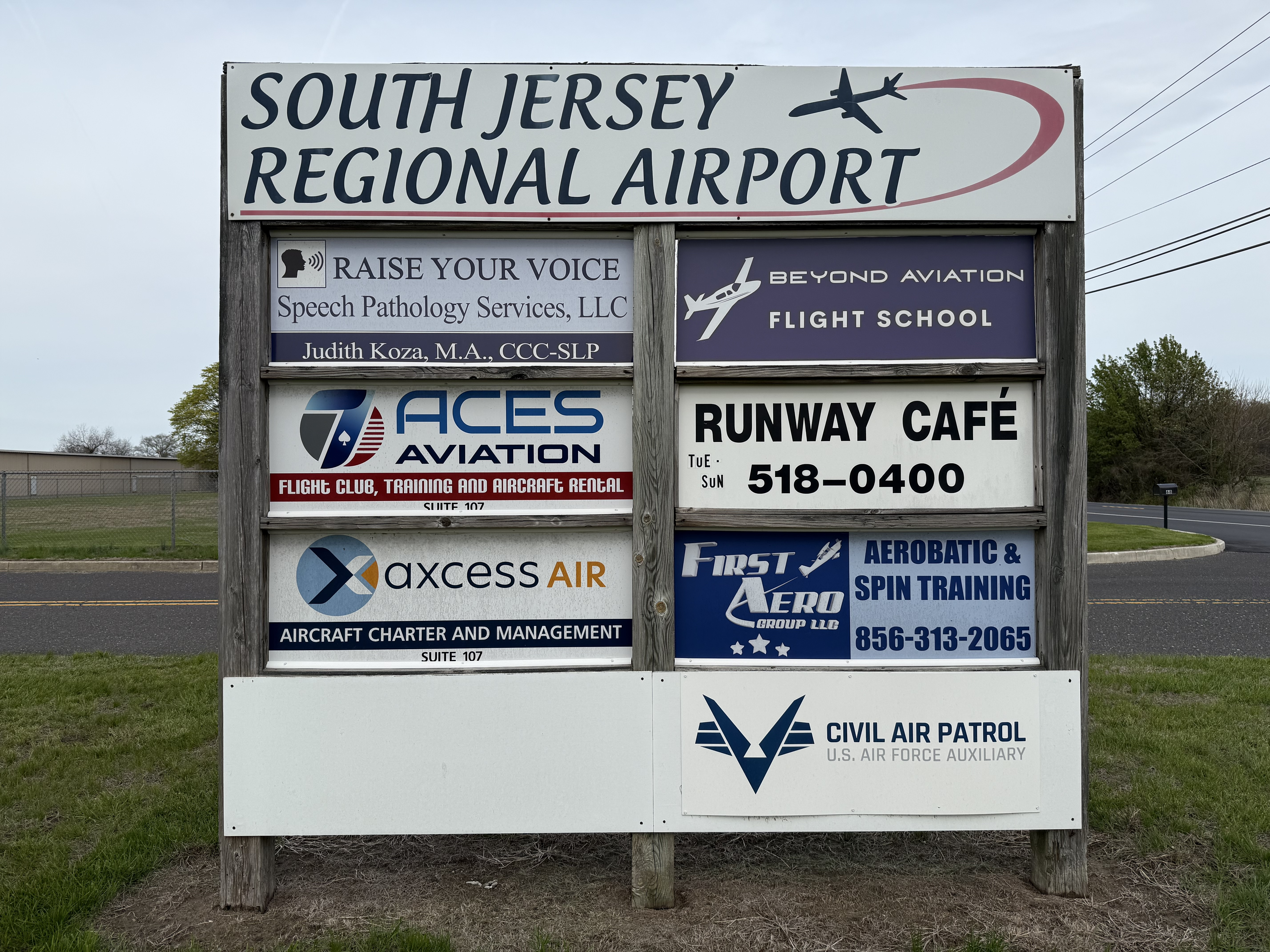
- IATA: LLY; ICAO: KVAY; FAA LID: VAY

Summary
- Airport type: Public
- Owner: N.J. Dept. of Transportation
- Operator: Flight 114, LLC.
- Serves: Mount Holly, New Jersey
- Elevation AMSL: 53 ft (16 m)
- Coordinates: 39°56′34″N 074°50′45″W
- Website: sjrairport.com

Map
- Interactive map of South Jersey Regional Airport

Runways
Direction	Length		Surface
Direction	ft	m	Surface
8/26	3,881	1,183	Asphalt

Statistics (2017)
- Aircraft operations (year ending 11/17/2017): 34,022
- Based aircraft: 72
- Source: Federal Aviation Administration

South Jersey Regional Airport (IATA: LLY, ICAO: KVAY, FAA LID: VAY, formerly 7MY) is a public use airport in Lumberton Township, Burlington County, New Jersey, United States. Owned by the New Jersey Department of Transportation, the airport is located four nautical miles (7 km) southwest of the central business district of Mount Holly, New Jersey. This facility is included in the National Plan of Integrated Airport Systems for 2011–2015, which categorized it as a general aviation reliever airport.

Although many U.S. airports use the same three-letter location identifier for the FAA and IATA, this airport is assigned VAY by the FAA and LLY by the IATA. The airport's ICAO identifier is KVAY.

== Facilities and aircraft ==
South Jersey Regional Airport covers an area of 642 acres (260 ha) at an elevation of 53 feet (16 m) above mean sea level. It has one runway designated 8/26 with an asphalt surface measuring 3,881 by 50 feet (1,183 x 15 m).

For the 12-month period ending November 17, 2017, the airport had 34,022 aircraft operations, an average of 93 per day: 100% general aviation. At that time there were 72 aircraft based at this airport: 65% single-engine, 6 multi-engine, and 1 helicopter.

The Air Victory Museum is located at the airport.

== See also ==
- List of airports in New Jersey
