= New Jersey Senate =

Upper house of the New Jersey Legislature

Coordinates: 40.21869°N 74.76429°W

- New Jersey Legislature

Type
- Type: Upper house
- Term limits: None

History
- New session started: January 13, 2026

Leadership
- President: Nicholas Scutari (D) since January 11, 2022
- President pro tempore: Shirley Turner (D) since January 9, 2024
- Majority Leader: Teresa Ruiz (D) since January 11, 2022
- Minority Leader: Anthony M. Bucco (R) since July 1, 2023

Structure
- Seats: 40
- Political groups: Majority: Democratic (25); Minority: Republican (15)
- Length of term: 4 years (with one two-year term each decade)
- Authority: Article IV, New Jersey Constitution
- Salary: $82,000/year

Elections
- Last election: November 7, 2023
- Next election: November 2, 2027
- Redistricting: New Jersey Apportionment Commission

Meeting place
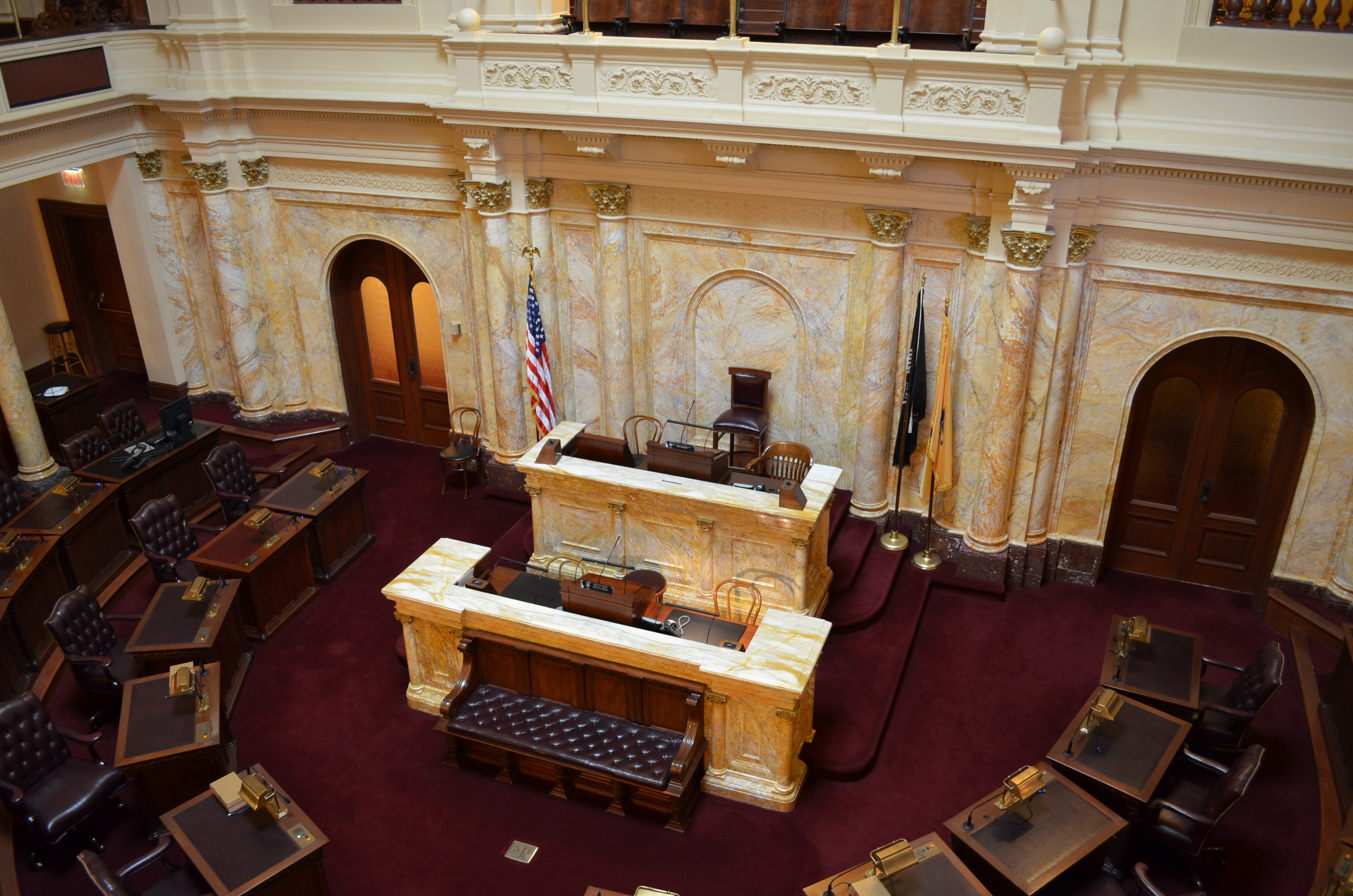
- State Senate Chamber; New Jersey State House; Trenton, New Jersey

Website
- New Jersey State Legislature

The New Jersey Senate is the upper house of the New Jersey Legislature by the Constitution of 1844, replacing the Legislative Council. There are 40 legislative districts, representing districts with an average population of 232,225 (2020 figure). Each district has one senator and two members of the New Jersey General Assembly, the lower house of the legislature. Prior to the election in which they are chosen, senators must be a minimum of 30 years old and a resident of the state for four years to be eligible to serve in office.

From 1844 until 1965 (when the Reynolds v. Sims US Supreme Court decision mandated all state legislators be elected from districts of roughly equal population), each county was an electoral district electing one senator. Under the 1844 Constitution, the term of office was three years, which was changed to four years with the 1947 Constitution. Since 1968 the Senate has consisted of 40 senators, who are elected in a 2-4-4 cycle. Senators serve a two-year term at the beginning of each decade, with the rest of the decade divided into two four-year terms. The 2-4-4 cycle was put into place so that Senate elections can reflect the changes made to the district boundaries on the basis of the decennial United States Census. If the cycle were not put into place, then the boundaries would sometimes be four years out of date before being used for Senate elections. Rather, with the varied term, the boundaries are only two years out of date. Thus elections for Senate seats take place in years ending with a 1, 3, or 7 (i.e. next elections in 2027, 2031, and 2033).

Interim appointments are made to fill vacant legislative seats by the county committee or committees of the party of the vacating person (since a constitutional amendment passed on November 8, 1988). The office is on the ballot for the next general election, even if the other Senate seats are not up for election in that year (such as in years ending with a 5 or 9, such as 2009 or 2015). The sole exception to this is if the vacancy occurred within 51 days of the election, in which case the appointment stands until the following general election.

Service as a State Senator or Member of the General Assembly is considered to be part-time. Since 2026, legislators receive a base salary of $82,000. The last time the salary had increased was 2002. At that time, State Senators and Members of the General Assembly received an annual base salary of $49,000 with the Senate President and the Assembly Speaker earning slightly more (1/3 over the base). This was an increase from $35,000, which had been in effect since 1990. Additionally, each legislator receives an annual allowance of $150,000 for staff salaries. In the 2025 Fiscal Year, the total cost of the Legislature in the state budget was $127,346,000. Of this amount, $18,690,000 was appropriated to the State Senate for salaries and other costs, and $25,208,000 was appropriated to the General Assembly.

== Composition ==
Affiliation	Party (Shading indicates majority caucus)		Total	Vacant
Affiliation	Democratic	Republican	Total	Vacant
Begin 2018	25	15	40	0
End 2020	26	13	39	1
2020–2022 legislature	25	15	40	0
2022–2024 legislature	24	16	40	0
Begin 2024	25	15	40	0
Latest voting share	62.5%	37.5%		

=== List of state senators ===
District	Name	Party	Start	Counties	Residence
1	Mike Testa	Republican	December 5, 2019	Atlantic, Cape May, Cumberland	Vineland
2	Vincent J. Polistina	Republican	November 8, 2021	Atlantic	Egg Harbor Township
3	John Burzichelli	Democratic	January 9, 2024	Cumberland, Gloucester, Salem	Paulsboro
4	Paul D. Moriarty	Democratic	January 9, 2024	Atlantic, Camden, Gloucester	Washington Township
5	Nilsa Cruz-Perez	Democratic	December 15, 2014	Camden, Gloucester	Barrington
6	James Beach	Democratic	January 3, 2009	Burlington, Camden	Voorhees Township
7	Troy Singleton	Democratic	January 9, 2018	Burlington	Palmyra
8	Latham Tiver	Republican	January 9, 2024	Atlantic, Burlington	Southampton
9	Carmen Amato	Republican	January 9, 2024	Ocean	Lacey
10	James W. Holzapfel	Republican	January 10, 2012	Monmouth, Ocean	Toms River
11	Vin Gopal	Democratic	January 9, 2018	Monmouth	Long Branch
12	Owen Henry	Republican	January 9, 2024	Burlington, Middlesex, Monmouth, Ocean	Old Bridge Township
13	Declan O'Scanlon	Republican	January 9, 2018	Monmouth	Little Silver
14	Linda R. Greenstein	Democratic	December 6, 2010	Mercer, Middlesex	Plainsboro Township
15	Shirley Turner	Democratic	January 13, 1998	Hunterdon, Mercer	Lawrence Township
16	Andrew Zwicker	Democratic	January 11, 2022	Hunterdon, Mercer, Middlesex, Somerset	South Brunswick
17	Bob Smith	Democratic	January 8, 2002	Middlesex, Somerset	Piscataway
18	Patrick J. Diegnan	Democratic	May 9, 2016	Middlesex	South Plainfield
19	Joe F. Vitale	Democratic	January 13, 1998	Middlesex	Woodbridge
20	Joseph Cryan	Democratic	January 9, 2018	Union	Union Township
21	Jon Bramnick	Republican	January 11, 2022	Middlesex, Morris, Somerset, Union	Westfield
22	Nicholas Scutari	Democratic	January 13, 2004	Somerset, Union	Linden
23	Doug Steinhardt	Republican	December 19, 2022	Hunterdon, Somerset, Warren	Lopatcong
24	Parker Space	Republican	January 9, 2024	Morris, Sussex, Warren	Wantage
25	Anthony M. Bucco	Republican	October 24, 2019	Morris, Passaic	Boonton Township
26	Joseph Pennacchio	Republican	January 8, 2008	Morris, Passaic	Rockaway Township
27	John F. McKeon	Democratic	January 9, 2024	Essex, Passaic	West Orange
28	Renee Burgess	Democratic	September 29, 2022	Essex, Union	Irvington
29	Teresa Ruiz	Democratic	January 8, 2008	Essex, Hudson	Newark
30	Robert W. Singer	Republican	October 14, 1993	Monmouth, Ocean	Lakewood Township
31	Angela V. McKnight	Democratic	January 9, 2024	Hudson	Jersey City
32	Raj Mukherji	Democratic	January 9, 2024	Hudson	Jersey City
33	Brian P. Stack	Democratic	January 8, 2008	Hudson	Union City
34	Britnee Timberlake	Democratic	January 9, 2024	Essex	East Orange
35	Benjie Wimberly	Democratic	January 30, 2025	Bergen, Passaic	Paterson
36	Paul Sarlo	Democratic	May 19, 2003	Bergen, Passaic	Wood-Ridge
37	Gordon M. Johnson	Democratic	January 11, 2022	Bergen	Englewood
38	Joseph Lagana	Democratic	April 12, 2018	Bergen	Paramus
39	Holly Schepisi	Republican	March 25, 2021	Bergen	River Vale
40	Kristin Corrado	Republican	October 5, 2017	Bergen, Essex, Passaic	Totowa

== Committees and committee chairs ==
Committee chairs for the 2026–2028 Legislative Session are:

- Budget and Appropriations – Paul Sarlo (D-District 36)
- Commerce – Joseph Lagana (D-District 38)
- Community and Urban Affairs – Troy Singleton (D-District 7)
- Economic Growth – Nilsa Cruz-Perez (D-District 5)
- Education – Vin Gopal (D-District 11)
- Environment and Energy – Bob Smith (D-District 17)
- Health, Human Services, and Senior Citizens – Joe F. Vitale (D-District 19)
- Higher Education – Joseph Cryan (D-District 20)
- Judiciary – Brian P. Stack (D-District 33)
- Labor – Gordon Johnson (D-District 37)
- Law and Public Safety – Linda R. Greenstein (D-District 14)
- Legislative Oversight – Andrew Zwicker (D-District 16)
- Military and Veterans' Affairs – Raj Mukherji (D-District 32)
- Rules and Order – Vacant
- State Government, Wagering, Tourism & Historic Preservation – James Beach (D-District 6)
- Transportation – Patrick J. Diegnan (D-District 18)

== List of Senate presidents ==
The following is a list of presidents of the New Jersey Senate since the adoption of the 1844 State Constitution:

- 1845–1848: John C. Smallwood, Gloucester
- 1849–1850: Ephraim March, Morris
- 1851: Silas D. Canfield, Passaic
- 1852: John Manners, Hunterdon
- 1853–1856: William C. Alexander, Mercer
- 1857–1858: Henry V. Speer, Middlesex
- 1859: Thomas H. Herring, Bergen
- 1860: Charles L. C. Gifford, Essex
- 1861: Edmund Perry, Hunterdon
- 1862: Joseph T. Crowell, Union
- 1863: Anthony Reckless, Monmouth
- 1864: Amos Robbins, Middlesex
- 1865: Edward W. Scudder, Mercer
- 1866: James M. Scovel, Camden
- 1867: Benjamin Buckley, Passaic
- 1868–1869: Henry S. Little, Monmouth
- 1870: Amos Robbins
- 1871–1872: Edward Bettle, Camden
- 1873–1875: John W. Taylor, Essex
- 1876: William J. Sewell, Camden
- 1877: Leon Abbett, Hudson
- 1878: George C. Ludlow, Middlesex
- 1879–1880: William J. Sewell
- 1881–1882: Garret Hobart, Passaic
- 1883: John J. Gardner, Atlantic
- 1884: Benjamin A. Vail, Union
- 1885: Abraham V. Schenck, Middlesex
- 1886: John W. Griggs, Passaic
- 1887: Frederick S. Fish, Essex
- 1888: George H. Large, Hunterdon
- 1889: George T. Werts, Morris
- 1890: Henry M. Nevius, Monmouth
- 1891–1893: Robert Adrain, Middlesex
- 1894: Maurice A. Rogers, Camden
- 1895: Edward C. Stokes, Cumberland
- 1896: Lewis A. Thompson, Somerset (resigned March 30)
- 1896–1897: Robert Williams, Passaic
- 1898: Foster M. Voorhees, Union (became Acting Governor February 1)
- 1898: William H. Skirm (pro tem), Mercer
- 1899: Charles A. Reed, Somerset
- 1900: William M. Johnson, Bergen
- 1901: Mahlon Pitney, Morris
- 1902: Charles Asa Francis, Monmouth
- 1903: Elijah C. Hutchinson, Mercer
- 1904: Edmund W. Wakelee, Bergen
- 1905: Joseph Cross, Union (resigned March 30)
- 1905–1906: William J. Bradley, Camden
- 1907: Bloomfield H. Minch, Cumberland
- 1908: Thomas J. Hillery, Morris
- 1909: Samuel K. Robbins, Burlington (resigned April 16)
- 1909–1910: Joseph S. Frelinghuysen, Somerset
- 1911: Ernest R. Ackerman, Union
- 1912: John Dyneley Prince, Passaic
- 1913: James F. Fielder, Hudson (became Acting Governor March 1)
- 1913: James A. C. Johnson (pro tem), Bergen
- 1914: John W. Slocum, Monmouth
- 1915: Walter E. Edge, Atlantic
- 1916: William T. Read, Camden (resigned March 29)
- 1916–1917: George W. F. Gaunt, Gloucester
- 1918: Thomas F. McCran, Passaic
- 1919: William N. Runyon, Union
- 1920: Clarence E. Case, Somerset
- 1921: Collins B. Allen, Salem
- 1922: William B. Mackay Jr., Bergen
- 1923: Joseph F. Wallworth, Camden
- 1924: Firman M. Reeves, Cumberland
- 1925: William H. Bright, Cape May
- 1926: Morgan F. Larson, Middlesex
- 1927: Francis B. Davis, Gloucester
- 1928: William A. Stevens, Monmouth
- 1929: Thomas A. Mathis, Ocean
- 1930: Arthur N. Pierson, Union
- 1931: Joseph G. Wolber, Essex
- 1932: A. Crozer Reeves, Mercer
- 1933: Emerson Lewis Richards, Atlantic
- 1934: Clifford R. Powell, Burlington
- 1935: Horace G. Prall, Hunterdon
- 1936: John C. Barbour, Passaic (resigned June 26)
- 1936–1937: Frank Durand, Monmouth
- 1938: Charles E. Loizeaux, Union
- 1939: Robert C. Hendrickson, Gloucester
- 1940: Arthur F. Foran, Hunterdon
- 1941–1942: I. Grant Scott, Cape May
- 1943: George H. Stanger, Cumberland
- 1944: Howard Eastwood, Burlington (resigned August 31)
- 1944: George H. Stanger
- 1945: Frank S. Farley, Atlantic
- 1946: Haydn Proctor, Monmouth
- 1947: Charles K. Barton, Passaic
- 1948: John M. Summerill Jr., Salem
- 1949: David Van Alstyne, Bergen
- 1950: Samuel L. Bodine, Hunterdon
- 1951: Alfred B. Littell, Sussex
- 1952: Harold W. Hannold, Gloucester
- 1953: David Young III, Morris
- 1954: W. Steelman Mathis, Ocean
- 1955: Bruce A. Wallace, Camden
- 1956: Wayne Dumont Jr., Warren
- 1957: Albert McCay, Burlington
- 1958: Richard R. Stout, Monmouth
- 1959: Wesley L. Lance, Hunterdon
- 1960: George B. Harper, Sussex
- 1961: Thomas J. Hillery, Morris
- 1962: Robert C. Crane, Union (resigned January 9)
- 1962: Frank S. Farley
- 1963: William E. Ozzard, Somerset
- 1964–1965: Charles W. Sandman, Cape May
- 1966: John A. Lynch Sr., 7th District
- 1967: Sido L. Ridolfi, 6th District
- 1968: Edwin B. Forsythe, 4B District
- 1969: Frank X. McDermott, 9th District
- 1970–1972: Raymond Bateman, 8th District
- 1973: Alfred N. Beadleston, 5th District
- 1974–1975: Frank J. Dodd, 26th District
- 1976–1977: Matthew Feldman, 37th District
- 1978–1981: Joseph P. Merlino, 13th District
- 1982–1986: Carmen A. Orechio, 30th District
- 1986–1990: John F. Russo, 10th District
- 1990–1991: John A. Lynch Jr., 17th District
- 1992–2002: Donald DiFrancesco, 22nd District
- 2002–2004: John O. Bennett, 12th District and Richard Codey, 27th District (co-presidents, with the Senate split 20-20)
- 2004–2008: Richard Codey, 27th District (resigned January 7, 2008)
- 2008: Bernard Kenny, 33rd District (served January 7 to January 8, after Codey resigned to honor Kenny)
- 2008–2010: Richard Codey, 27th District
- 2010–2022: Stephen Sweeney, 3rd District; he was the longest-serving Senate President.
- 2022–present Nicholas Scutari, 22nd District

== Double dipping ==
Under a state law that remained in effect until 2008, members of the New Jersey Assembly and Senate were allowed to serve in either chamber, as well as any other government positions they might have held at the time, although those who were still doing so as of 2008 ended up getting "grandfathered":

Name, Party-County – Second Public Office (names in bold represent state Senators still in both local and state offices as of 2025):

Senators:

- Dana Redd, D-Camden – Councilwoman, Camden
- Nicholas Sacco, D-Hudson – Mayor, North Bergen
- **Paul Sarlo, D-Bergen – Mayor, Wood-Ridge**
- Robert Singer, R-Ocean – Committeeman, Lakewood
- **Brian Stack, D-Hudson – Mayor, Union City**
- Stephen Sweeney, D-Gloucester – Freeholder, Gloucester County

== Special powers ==
=== Senatorial courtesy ===
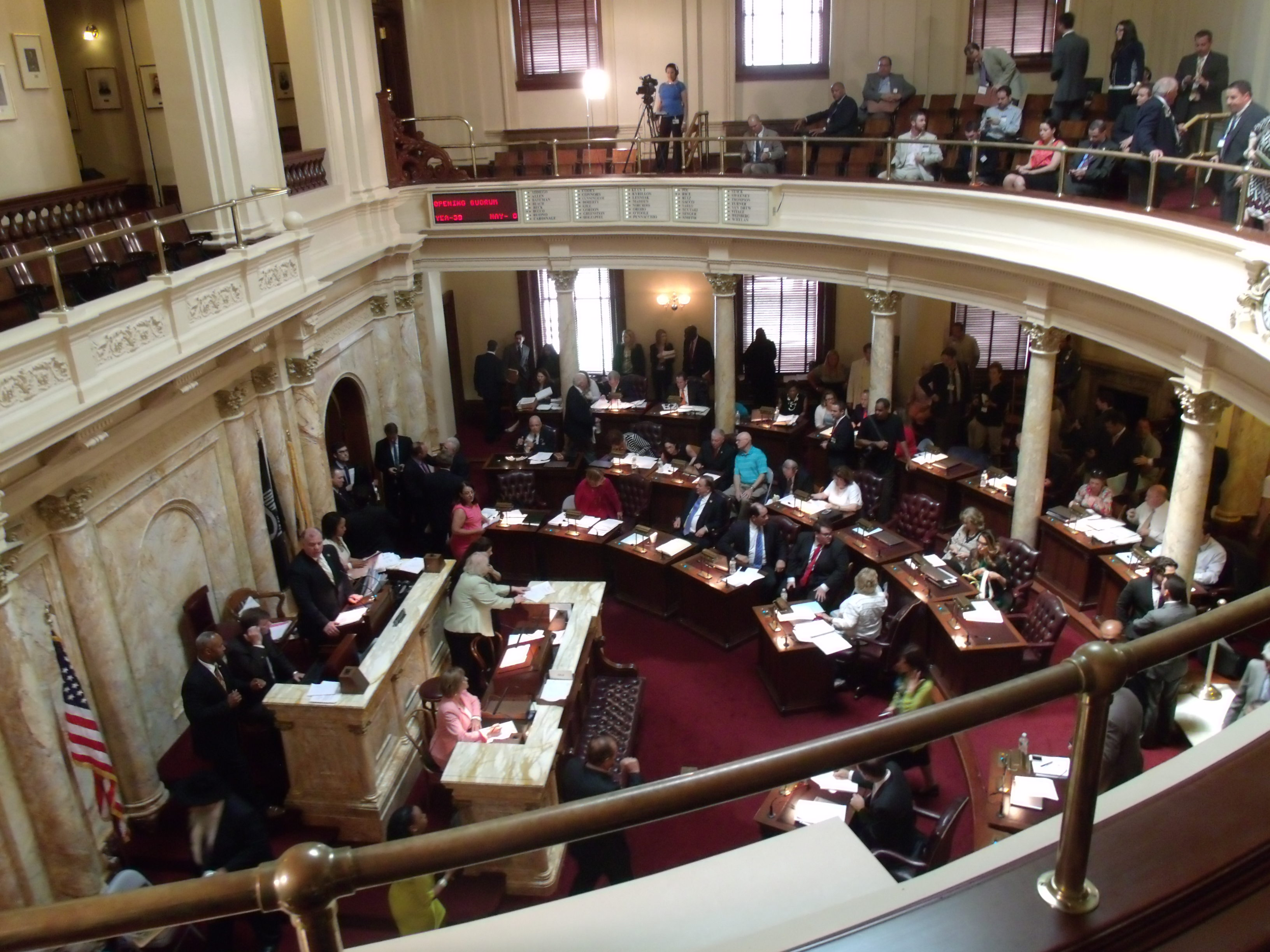
The New Jersey Senate in session in 2013

Senatorial courtesy is a senate tradition that allows home county legislators to intercede to prevent consideration of a local resident nominated by the governor for a position that requires Senate confirmation. Any of the senators from the nominee's home county can invoke senatorial courtesy to block a nomination, temporarily or permanently, without any obligation to justify the basis of their actions.

Governor Corzine nominated Stuart Rabner on June 4, 2007, to be the next Chief Justice of the New Jersey Supreme Court, replacing James R. Zazzali, who was nearing mandatory retirement age. Shortly after the nomination, two members of the Senate from Essex County, where Rabner resides, blocked consideration of his confirmation by invoking senatorial courtesy. State Senator Ronald Rice had initially blocked the nomination, but relented on June 15, 2007, after a meeting with the governor. Nia Gill dropped her block on June 19, 2007, but did not explain the nature of her concerns, though anonymous lawmakers cited in The New York Times indicated that the objection was due to Rabner's race and Governor Corzine's failure to consider a minority candidate for the post. Also in June 2007, Loretta Weinberg used senatorial courtesy privileges to hold up consideration of a new term in office for Bergen County Prosecutor John Molinelli.

=== Acting governor ===
Until 2010, in the event of a gubernatorial vacancy, the New Jersey Constitution had specified that the President of the Senate (followed by the Speaker of the New Jersey General Assembly) would assume the role of Acting Governor and retain their role in the Senate (or Assembly). An Acting Governor would then assume the governorship while retaining their role in their house of the legislature.

The lieutenant governor of New Jersey took office for the first time on January 19, 2010, following an election with the governor of New Jersey. The position was created as the result of a constitutional amendment to the New Jersey State Constitution passed on November 8, 2005. While the amendment itself took effect as of January 17, 2006, and made some interim changes to the succession to the governorship, the first lieutenant governor was not elected until November 3, 2009. The President of the Senate now serves as acting governor only in the absence of both the governor and lieutenant governor. For example, Nicholas Scutari became acting governor of New Jersey on June 4, 2022, as both Governor Phil Murphy and Lieutenant Governor Sheila Oliver were out of state on personal trips. He again became acting governor on July 31, 2023 when Murphy was out of state and Oliver was in the hospital due to an illness, from which she died the following day. Oliver's death led Scutari to serve as acting lieutenant governor until the vacancy was officially filled on September 8, 2023, when Tahesha Way was sworn in.
