= 1967 New Jersey Senate election =

1967 New Jersey Senate elections
- November 7, 1967

All 40 seats in the New Jersey State Senate 21 seats needed for a majority
- Turnout: 64% (▼9pp)
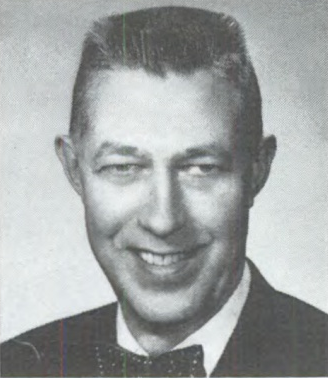

	Majority party	Minority party
Leader	Edwin B. Forsythe	Sido L. Ridolfi
Party	Republican	Democratic
Leader's seat	4B (Moorestown)	6th (Trenton)
Last election	10	19
Seats before	8	18
Seats won	31	9
Seat change	▲23	▼9
Popular vote	3,053,336	2,511,142
Senate President before election
Sido L. Ridolfi
Democratic
Elected Senate President
Edwin B. Forsythe
Republican

The 1967 New Jersey Senate elections were held on November 7, 1967.

The elections took place midway through Governor Richard J. Hughes's second term and resulted in a historic landslide for the Republican Party. The new state legislative map still elected most Senators county-wide, allowing Republicans to gain a large majority by sweeping every county except Mercer, Middlesex, and Hudson.

== Background ==
=== Reapportioning ===
Until 1965, the New Jersey State Senate was composed of 21 senators with each county electing one senator. After the U.S. Supreme Court decision in Reynolds v. Sims required legislative districts to be approximately equal in population (a principle known as "one man, one vote"), New Jersey entered a decade-long period of reapportioning. In 1965, the Senate was increased to 29 members, with larger counties given multiple seats and some smaller counties sharing one or two senators.

For the 1967 election, the map was organized by the 1966 New Jersey constitutional convention. Assembly districts were drawn by the New Jersey Apportionment Commission. Eleven new seats were added to the Senate, with county lines generally followed to create 11 single county districts and two multi-county, single senator districts. As a result of a New Jersey Supreme Court decision, several existing districts were split up into districts smaller than a single county. This was contrary to the apportionment scheme in the New Jersey Constitution.

- Mercer, Middlesex, Union, Hudson, Bergen, and Passaic counties gained one seat each.
- Essex County gained two seats.
- Atlantic, Cape May, Camden, Cumberland, Gloucester, and Salem counties gained one combined seat for a total of six.
- Burlington, Monmouth, and Ocean counties gained one combined seat for a total of four.
- Hunterdon, Morris, Somerset, Sussex, and Warren counties gained one combined seat for a total of five.

1965 District	Counties	#	1967 District	Counties	#	±
1	Atlantic, Cape May, and Gloucester	2	1	Cape May and Cumberland	1	▲1
2	Cumberland and Salem	1	2	Atlantic	1	▲1
3	Camden	2	3A	Salem and Gloucester (part)	1	▲1
			3B	Gloucester (part) and Camden (part)	1	▲1
			3C	Camden (part)	1	▲1
			3D	Camden (part)	1	▲1
4	Burlington	1	4A	Burlington (part) and Ocean	1	▲1
5	Monmouth and Ocean	2	4B	Burlington (part)	1	▲1
			5	Monmouth	2	▲1
6	Mercer	1	6	Mercer	2	▲1
7	Middlesex	2	7	Middlesex	3	▲1
9	Union	2	9	Union	3	▲1
11	Essex	4	11	Essex	6	▲2
12	Hudson	3	12	Hudson	4	▲1
13	Bergen	4	13	Bergen	5	▲1
14	Passaic	2	14	Passaic	3	▲1
8	Hunterdon and Somerset	1	8	Somerset	1	▲1
10	Morris, Sussex, Warren	2	10	Morris	2	▲1
			15	Hunterdon, Warren, and Sussex	1	▲1

== Incumbents not running for re-election ==
=== Republican ===
- Frederick J. Scholz (District 3)
- Nelson Stamler (District 9)

== Summary of results by district ==
1964–66 District	Incumbent	Party		Party
District 1	Vacant (Note: This seat had been vacant since Senator John E. Hunt resigned to take his seat in the U.S. House of Representatives.)		Robert E. Kay	Rep
District 1	Frank S. Farley (Note: Redistricted to District 2.)	Rep	Seat eliminated	
District 2	John A. Waddington (Note: Redistricted to District 3A.)	Dem	Frank S. Farley	Rep
District 3 (Note: Split into Districts 3A, 3B, 3C, and 3D.)	Frederick J. Scholz	Rep	John L. White	Rep
District 3	Vacant (Note: The seat had been vacant since Senator A. Donald Bigley resigned to become Camden County Prosecutor in June.)		Hugh A. Kelly	Rep
District 3	New seat		John L. Miller	Rep
District 3	New seat		Frank C. Italiano	Rep
District 4 (Note: Split into Districts 4A and 4B.)	New seat		William T. Hiering	Rep
District 4	Edwin B. Forsythe	Rep	Edwin B. Forsythe	Rep
District 5	Richard R. Stout	Rep	Richard R. Stout	Rep
District 5	William T. Hiering (Note: Redistricted to District 4A)	Rep	Alfred N. Beadleston	Rep
District 6	Sido L. Ridolfi	Dem	Sido L. Ridolfi	Dem
District 6	New seat		Richard J. Coffee	Dem
District 7	John A. Lynch Sr.	Dem	John A. Lynch Sr.	Dem
District 7	J. Edward Crabiel	Dem	J. Edward Crabiel	Dem
District 7	New seat		Norman Tanzman	Dem
District 8	Vacant (Note: The seat had been vacant since the July 10 resignation of Senator William E. Ozzard to accept a seat on the New Jersey Board of Public Utilities.)		Raymond Bateman	Rep
District 9	Nelson Stamler	Rep	Nicholas S. LaCorte	Rep
District 9	Mildred Barry Hughes	Dem	Frank X. McDermott	Rep
District 9	New seat		Matt Rinaldo	Rep
District 10	Thomas J. Hillery	Rep	Harry L. Sears	Rep
District 10	Milton Woolfenden Jr. (Note: Redistricted to District 15. Lost primary.)	Rep	Joseph J. Maraziti	Rep
District 11	Nicholas Fernicola	Dem	Michael Giuliano	Rep
District 11	Maclyn Goldman	Dem	Gerardo Del Tufo	Rep
District 11	John J. Giblin	Dem	Alexander Matturri	Rep
District 11	Hutchins F. Inge	Dem	James Wallwork	Rep
District 11	New seat		Milton Waldor	Rep
District 11	New seat		David W. Dowd	Rep
District 12	William Musto	Dem	William Musto	Dem
District 12	William F. Kelly Jr.	Dem	William F. Kelly Jr.	Dem
District 12	Frank J. Guarini	Dem	Frank J. Guarini	Dem
District 12	New seat		Frederick H. Hauser	Dem
District 13	Ned J. Parsekian	Dem	Fairleigh Dickinson Jr.	Rep
District 13	Matthew Feldman	Dem	Joseph C. Woodcock	Rep
District 13	Jeremiah F. O'Connor	Dem	Alfred D. Schiaffo	Rep
District 13	Alfred W. Kiefer	Dem	Garrett W. Hagedorn	Rep
District 13	New seat		Willard B. Knowlton	Rep
District 14	Anthony J. Grossi	Dem	Ira Schoem	Rep
District 14	Joseph M. Keegan	Dem	Frank J. Sciro	Rep
District 14	New seat		Edward Sisco	Rep
District 15	New seat		Wayne Dumont	Rep

=== Close races ===
Districts where the difference of total votes between the top two parties was under 10%:

1. District 1, 3.11%
2. District 3A, 9.25% gain
3. District 3D, 5.74% gain
4. District 6A, 6.22%
5. District 6B, 6.77% gain
6. District 7A, 2.5%
7. District 7B, 2.1%
8. District 7C, 2.2% gain
9. District 9A, 5.2%
10. District 9B, 7.6% gain
11. District 9C, 7.7% gain
12. District 11A, 2.4% gain
13. District 11B, 2.4% gain
14. District 11C, 2.4% gain
15. District 11D, 2.6% gain
16. District 11E, 2.7% gain
17. District 11F, 2.5% gain
18. District 13A, 5.0% gain
19. District 13B, 5.3% gain
20. District 13C, 4.0% gain
21. District 13D, 4.6% gain
22. District 13E, 4.3% gain
23. District 14A, 2.4% gain
24. District 14B, 3.6% gain
25. District 14C, 4.0% gain

== District 1 ==
=== Republican primary ===
==== Candidates ====
- Robert E. Kay

==== Results ====
1967 Republican primary
Party	Candidate	Votes	%
Republican	Robert E. Kay	10,414	100.00%
Total votes		10,414	100.00%

=== Democratic primary ===
==== Candidates ====
- Robert J. Halpin
- Robert H. Weber

==== Results ====
1967 Democratic primary
Party	Candidate	Votes	%
Democratic	Robert J. Halpin	4,483	57.42%
Democratic	Robert H. Weber	3,324	42.58%
Total votes		7,807	100.00%

=== General election ===
==== Candidates ====
- Linwood Erickson Jr. (Conservative)
- Robert J. Halpin (Democratic)
- Robert E. Kay (Republican)

==== Results ====
District 1 (one seat)
Party	Candidate	Votes	%
Republican	Robert E. Kay	27,841	51.22%
Democratic	Robert J. Halpin	26,149	48.11%
Conservative	Linwood Erickson Jr.	364	0.67%
Total votes		54,354	100.00%

== District 2 ==
=== Republican primary ===
==== Candidates ====
- Frank S. Farley, incumbent senator since 1941

==== Results ====
1967 Republican primary
Party	Candidate	Votes	%
Republican	Frank S. Farley (incumbent)	17,619	100.00%
Total votes		17,619	100.00%

=== Democratic primary ===
==== Candidates ====
- Harry A. Gaines
- Thomas Silvestro

==== Results ====
1967 Democratic primary
Party	Candidate	Votes	%
Democratic	Harry A. Gaines	2,460	52.39%
Democratic	Thomas Silvestro	2,236	47.61%
Total votes		4,696	100.00%

=== General election ===
==== Candidates ====
- Frank S. Farley, incumbent senator since 1941 (Republican)
- Harry A. Gaines (Democratic)

==== Results ====
District 2 (one seat)
Party	Candidate	Votes	%
Republican	Frank S. Farley	36,300	61.51%
Democratic	Harry A. Gaines	22,716	38.49%
Total votes		59,016	100.00%

== District 3A ==
=== Democratic primary ===
==== Candidates ====
- John A. Waddington, incumbent senator since 1956

==== Results ====
1967 Democratic primary
Party	Candidate	Votes	%
Democratic	John A. Waddington (incumbent)	4,433	100.00%
Total votes		4,433	100.00%

=== Republican primary ===
==== Candidates ====
- John L. White, assemblyman from Gloucester County

==== Results ====
1967 Republican primary
Party	Candidate	Votes	%
Republican	John L. White	5,186	100.00%
Total votes		5,186	100.00%

=== General election ===
==== Candidates ====
- Albert Ronis (Socialist Labor)
- John A. Waddington, incumbent senator since 1956 (Democratic)
- John L. White, assemblyman from Gloucester County (Republican)

==== Results ====
District 3A (one seat)
Party	Candidate	Votes	%
Republican	John L. White	28,456	54.60%
Democratic	John A. Waddington (incumbent)	23,635	45.35%
Socialist Labor	Albert Ronis	28	0.05%
Total votes		52,119	100.00%

== District 3B ==
=== Democratic primary ===
==== Candidates ====
- Joseph M. Sandone

==== Results ====
1967 Democratic primary
Party	Candidate	Votes	%
Democratic	Joseph M. Sandone	6,401	100.00%
Total votes		6,401	100.00%

=== Republican primary ===
==== Candidates ====
- Hugh A. Kelly Jr., Camden County undersheriff

==== Results ====
1967 Republican primary
Party	Candidate	Votes	%
Republican	Hugh A. Kelly Jr.	4,520	100.00%
Total votes		4,520	100.00%

=== General election ===
==== Candidates ====
- Hugh A. Kelly Jr., Camden County undersheriff (Republican)
- Joseph M. Sandone (Democratic)

==== Results ====
District 3B (one seat)
Party	Candidate	Votes	%
Republican	Hugh A. Kelly Jr.	30,514	55.68%
Democratic	Joseph M. Sandone	24,285	44.32%
Total votes		54,799	100.00%

== District 3C ==
=== Republican primary ===
==== Candidates ====
- John L. Miller, assemblyman from Cherry Hill

==== Results ====
1967 Republican primary
Party	Candidate	Votes	%
Republican	John L. Miller	4,530	100.00%
Total votes		4,530	100.00%

=== Democratic primary ===
==== Candidates ====
- Richard S. Hyland, Cherry Hill attorney and brother and William F. Hyland

==== Results ====
1967 Democratic primary
Party	Candidate	Votes	%
Democratic	Richard S. Hyland	2,125	100.00%
Total votes		2,125	100.00%

=== General election ===
==== Candidates ====
- Richard S. Hyland, Cherry Hill attorney and brother and William F. Hyland (Democratic)
- John L. Miller, assemblyman from Cherry Hill (Republican)

==== Results ====
District 3C (one seat)
Party	Candidate	Votes	%
Republican	John L. Miller	29,483	61.50%
Democratic	Richard S. Hyland	18,454	38.50%
Total votes		47,937	100.00%

== District 3D ==
=== Democratic primary ===
==== Candidates ====
- Alfred R. Pierce

==== Results ====
1967 Democratic primary
Party	Candidate	Votes	%
Democratic	Alfred R. Pierce	4,235	100.00%
Total votes		4,235	100.00%

=== Republican primary ===
==== Candidates ====
- Frank C. Italiano

==== Results ====
1967 Republican primary
Party	Candidate	Votes	%
Republican	Frank C. Italiano	1,815	100.00%
Total votes		1,815	100.00%

=== General election ===
==== Candidates ====
- Dominic W. Doganiero (Socialist Labor)
- Frank C. Italiano (Republican)
- Alfred R. Pierce (Democratic)

==== Results ====
District 3D (one seat)
Party	Candidate	Votes	%
Republican	Frank C. Italiano	18,735	52.63%
Democratic	Alfred R. Pierce	16,690	46.89%
Socialist Labor	Dominic W. Doganiero	171	0.48%
Total votes		35,596	100.00%

== District 4A ==
=== Democratic primary ===
==== Candidates ====
- Eugene E. Helbig
- R. Bruce Veeder

==== Results ====
1967 Democratic primary
Party	Candidate	Votes	%
Democratic	Eugene E. Helbig	2,605	69.99%
Democratic	R. Bruce Veeder	1,117	30.01%
Total votes		3,722	100.00%

=== Republican primary ===
==== Candidates ====
- William T. Hiering

==== Results ====
1967 Republican primary
Party	Candidate	Votes	%
Republican	William T. Hiering	11,478	100.00%
Total votes		11,478	100.00%

=== General election ===
==== Candidates ====
- Eugene E. Helbig (Democratic)
- William T. Hiering (Republican)

==== Results ====
District 4A (one seat)
Party	Candidate	Votes	%
Republican	William T. Hiering	35,639	71.07%
Democratic	Eugene E. Helbig	14,505	28.93%
Total votes		50,144	100.00%

== District 4B ==
=== Republican primary ===
==== Candidates ====
- Edwin B. Forsythe, incumbent senator since 1964

==== Results ====
1967 Republican primary
Party	Candidate	Votes	%
Republican	Edwin B. Forsythe (incumbent)	8,908	100.00%
Total votes		8,908	100.00%

=== Democratic primary ===
==== Candidates ====
- Edward J. Hughes Jr.

==== Results ====
1967 Democratic primary
Party	Candidate	Votes	%
Democratic	Edward J. Hughes Jr.	6,411	100.00%
Total votes		6,411	100.00%

=== General election ===
==== Candidates ====
- Bernardo S. Doganiero (Socialist Labor)
- Edwin B. Forsythe, incumbent senator since 1964 (Republican)
- Edward J. Hughes Jr. (Democratic)

==== Results ====
District 4B (one seat)
Party	Candidate	Votes	%
Republican	Edwin B. Forsythe (incumbent)	30,930	55.73%
Democratic	Edward J. Hughes Jr.	24,359	43.89%
Socialist Labor	Bernardo S. Doganiero	207	0.37%
Total votes		55,496	100.00%

== District 5 ==
=== Republican primary ===
==== Candidates ====
- Alfred N. Beadleston, assemblyman from Shrewsbury
- Richard R. Stout, incumbent senator since 1952

==== Results ====
1967 Republican primary
Party	Candidate	Votes	%
Republican	Richard R. Stout (incumbent)	13,899	50.11%
Republican	Alfred N. Beadleston	13,837	49.89%
Total votes		27,736	100.00%

=== Democratic primary ===
==== Candidates ====
- Richard L. Bonello
- Paul J. Smith

==== Results ====
1967 Democratic primary
Party	Candidate	Votes	%
Democratic	Paul J. Smith	9,480	50.75%
Democratic	Richard L. Bonello	9,200	49.25%
Total votes		18,680	100.00%

=== General election ===
==== Candidates ====
- Richard L. Bonello (Democratic)
- Alfred N. Beadleston, assemblyman from Shrewsbury (Republican)
- Paul J. Smith (Democratic)
- Richard R. Stout, incumbent senator since 1952 (Republican)

==== Results ====
District 5 (two seats)
Party	Candidate	Votes	%
Republican	Richard R. Stout (incumbent)	69,714	32.05%
Republican	Alfred N. Beadleston	68,005	32.05%
Democratic	Richard L. Bonello	40,426	18.59%
Democratic	Paul J. Smith	39,370	18.10%
Total votes		217,515	100.00%

== District 6 ==
=== Democratic primary ===
==== Candidates ====
- Richard J. Coffee, Mercer County freeholder and former mayor of Lawrence
- Charles E. Farrington, assemblyman from Princeton
- Sido L. Ridolfi, incumbent senator since 1954

==== Results ====
1967 Democratic primary
Party	Candidate	Votes	%
Democratic	Sido L. Ridolfi (incumbent)	19,758	43.44%
Democratic	Richard J. Coffee	15,848	34.85%
Democratic	Charles E. Farrington	9,874	21.71%
Total votes		45,480	100.00%

=== Republican primary ===
==== Candidates ====
- Bruce M. Schragger
- George Y. Schoch

==== Results ====
1967 Republican primary
Party	Candidate	Votes	%
Republican	Bruce M. Schragger	5,074	50.19%
Republican	George Y. Schoch	5,035	49.81%
Total votes		10,109	100.00%

=== General election ===
==== Candidates ====
- Richard J. Coffee, Mercer County freeholder and former mayor of Lawrence (Democratic)
- Sido L. Ridolfi, incumbent senator since 1954 (Democratic)
- Bruce M. Schragger (Republican)
- George Y. Schoch (Republican)

==== Results ====
District 6 (two seats)
Party	Candidate	Votes	%
Democratic	Sido L. Ridolfi (incumbent)	47,226	28.53%
Democratic	Richard J. Coffee	45,960	27.77%
Republican	Bruce M. Schragger	36,928	22.31%
Republican	George Y. Schoch	34,762	21.00%
Socialist Labor	Joseph J. Frank	653	0.39%
Total votes		165,529	100.00%

== District 7 ==
=== Democratic primary ===
==== Candidates ====
- J. Edward Crabiel, incumbent senator since 1966
- John A. Lynch Sr., incumbent senator since 1956 and former mayor of New Brunswick
- Norman Tanzman, assemblyman from Woodbridge

==== Results ====
1967 Democratic primary
Party	Candidate	Votes	%
Democratic	John A. Lynch Sr. (incumbent)	18,780	34.00%
Democratic	Norman Tanzman	18,251	33.04%
Democratic	J. Edward Crabiel (incumbent)	18,207	32.96%
Total votes		55,238	100.00%

=== Republican primary ===
==== Candidates ====
- John A. Bradley
- Edgar J. Hellriegel
- William Shelley

==== Results ====
1967 Republican primary
Party	Candidate	Votes	%
Republican	John A. Bradley	6,425	33.55%
Republican	William Shelley	6,384	33.34%
Republican	Edgar J. Hellriegel	6,342	33.12%
Total votes		19,151	100.00%

=== General election ===
==== Candidates ====
- John A. Bradley (Republican)
- J. Edward Crabiel, incumbent senator since 1966 (Democratic)
- Edgar J. Hellriegel (Republican)
- John A. Lynch Sr., incumbent senator since 1956 and former mayor of New Brunswick (Democratic)
- William Shelley (Republican)
- Norman Tanzman, assemblyman from Woodbridge (Democratic)

==== Results ====
District 7 (three seats)
Party	Candidate	Votes	%
Democratic	John A. Lynch Sr. (incumbent)	77,363	18.2
Democratic	J. Edward Crabiel (incumbent)	74,784	17.6
Democratic	Norman Tanzman	74,739	17.6
Republican	John A. Bradley	34,762	15.7
Republican	William Shelley	66,102	15.5
Republican	Edgar J. Hellriegel	65,447	15.4
Total votes			100.00%

== District 8 ==
=== Republican primary ===
==== Candidates ====
- Raymond Bateman, assemblyman from Branchburg

==== Results ====
1967 Republican primary
Party	Candidate	Votes	%
Republican	Raymond Bateman	10,266	100.00%
Total votes		10,266	100.00%

=== Democratic primary ===
==== Candidates ====
- Thomas Ryan

==== Results ====
1967 Democratic primary
Party	Candidate	Votes	%
Democratic	Thomas Ryan	2,751	100.00%
Total votes		2,751	100.00%

=== General election ===
==== Candidates ====
- Raymond Bateman, assemblyman from Branchburg (Republican)
- Robert K. Haelig Sr. (Conservative)
- Thomas Ryan (Democratic)

==== Results ====
District 8 (one seat)
Party	Candidate	Votes	%
Republican	Raymond Bateman	35,223	68.0
Democratic	Thomas Ryan	15,188	29.3
Conservative	Robert K. Haelig Sr.	1,379	2.7
Total votes			100.00%

== District 9 ==
=== Democratic primary ===
==== Candidates ====
- Anthony J. Cascone
- Mildred Barry Hughes, incumbent senator since 1966
- James J. Kinneally Sr.
- Lester Weiner

==== Results ====
1967 Democratic primary
Party	Candidate	Votes	%
Democratic	Mildred Barry Hughes	13,181	33.55%
Democratic	James J. Kinneally Sr.	12,496	31.81%
Democratic	Lester Weiner	12,233	31.14%
Democratic	Anthony J. Cascone	1,377	3.50%
Total votes		39,287	100.00%

=== Republican primary ===
==== Candidates ====
- Nicholas S. LaCorte
- Frank X. McDermott, assemblyman from Westfield
- Matthew J. Rinaldo, former Union County freeholder

==== Results ====
1967 Republican primary
Party	Candidate	Votes	%
Republican	Frank X. McDermott	18,295	33.55%
Republican	Matthew J. Rinaldo	18,160	33.34%
Republican	Edgar J. Hellriegel	18,094	33.12%
Total votes		54,549	100.00%

=== General election ===
==== Candidates ====
- Kenneth Allardice (Union Conservative)
- Mildred Barry Hughes, incumbent senator since 1966 (Democratic)
- James J. Kinneally Sr. (Democratic)
- Nicholas S. LaCorte (Republican)
- Frank X. McDermott, assemblyman from Westfield (Republican)
- Matthew J. Rinaldo, former Union County freeholder (Republican)
- Lester Weiner (Democratic)
- Alexander G. Wrigley (No Unnecessary Taxes)

==== Results ====
District 9 (three seats)
Party	Candidate	Votes	%
Republican	Nicholas S. LaCorte	89,036	20.0
Republican	Frank X. McDermott	88,378	19.8
Republican	Matt Rinaldo	86,656	19.4
Democratic	Mildred Barry Hughes (incumbent)	65,999	14.8
Democratic	Lester Weiner	54,364	12.2
Democratic	James J. Kinneally Sr.	52,347	11.7
Independent	Alexander G. Wrigley	5,508	1.2
Conservative	Kenneth Allardice	3,854	0.9
Total votes			100.00%

== District 10 ==
=== Republican primary ===
==== Candidates ====
- Thomas J. Hillery, incumbent senator since 1954
- Joseph J. Maraziti, assemblyman from Boonton
- Harry L. Sears, assemblyman from Mountain Lakes
- L. Arlington Waite, Rockaway physician

==== Results ====
1967 Republican primary
Party	Candidate	Votes	%
Republican	Harry L. Sears	21,383	34.86%
Republican	Joseph J. Maraziti	19,531	31.84%
Republican	Thomas J. Hillery (incumbent)	16,380	26.70%
Republican	L. Arlington Waite	4,046	6.60%
Total votes		61,340	100.00%

=== Democratic primary ===
==== Candidates ====
- Lemuel B. Howell
- Martin F. Quinn
- Dale W. Swann

==== Results ====
1967 Democratic primary
Party	Candidate	Votes	%
Democratic	Dale W. Swann	5,907	33.55%
Democratic	Martin F. Quinn	4,965	31.81%
Democratic	Lemuel B. Howell	12,233	31.14%
Democratic	Anthony J. Cascone	1,377	3.50%
Total votes		39,287	100.00%

=== General election ===
==== Candidates ====
- Charles Covino (Conservative)
- Victor J. De Falco (Conservative)
- Joseph J. Maraziti, assemblyman from Boonton (Republican)
- Martin F. Quinn (Democratic)
- Harry L. Sears, assemblyman from Mountain Lakes (Republican)
- Dale W. Swann (Democratic)

==== Results ====
District 10 (two seats)
Party	Candidate	Votes	%
Republican	Harry L. Sears	63,791	35.1
Republican	Joseph Maraziti	63,668	35.0
Democratic	Dale W. Swann	26,248	14.4
Democratic	Martin F. Quinn	24,694	13.6
Conservative	Victor J. De Falco	1,708	0.9
Conservative	Charles Covino	1,650	0.9
Total votes			100.00%

== District 11 ==
=== Democratic primary ===
==== Candidates ====
- Victor F. Addonizio, assemblyman from Orange and brother of Hugh Addonizio
- Nicholas Fernicola, incumbent senator since 1966
- John J. Giblin, incumbent senator since 1966
- Maclyn Goldman, incumbent senator since 1966
- Hutchins F. Inge, incumbent senator since 1966
- David Mandelbaum, assemblyman from Maplewood

==== Results ====
1967 Democratic primary
Party	Candidate	Votes	%
Democratic	Nicholas Fernicola (incumbent)	22,658	17.17%
Democratic	Hutchins F. Inge (incumbent)	22,400	16.97%
Democratic	John J. Giblin (incumbent)	22,177	16.81%
Democratic	Maclyn Goldman (incumbent)	21,890	16.59%
Democratic	Victor F. Addonizio	21,610	16.38%
Democratic	David Mandelbaum	21,219	16.08%
Total votes		131,954	100.00%

=== Republican primary ===
==== Candidates ====
- Frank L. Bate
- Thomas E. Boyle
- Gerardo Del Tufo, former assemblyman from Newark
- David W. Dowd, former mayor of Livingston
- Irwin I. Kimmelman, former assemblyman from South Orange
- Michael Giuliano, candidate for Assembly in 1965
- Alexander Matturri, former chair of the Newark Housing Authority
- Frederic Remington, businessman
- C. Marion Scipio
- J. Harry Smith
- Jack J. Soriano, Bloomfield attorney
- Milton Waldor, West Orange attorney
- James Wallwork, former assemblyman from Short Hills

==== Results ====
1967 Republican primary
Party	Candidate	Votes	%
Republican	James Wallwork	21,156	9.27%
Republican	Gerardo Del Tufo	19,889	8.72%
Republican	Alexander Matturri	19,723	8.64%
Republican	David W. Dowd	19,324	8.47%
Republican	Michael Giuliano	19,245	8.43%
Republican	Milton Waldor	19,243	8.43%
Republican	Frederic Remington	19,087	8.37%
Republican	Jack J. Soriano	18,668	8.18%
Republican	Irwin I. Kimmelman	18,525	8.12%
Republican	Frank L. Bate	18,225	7.99%
Republican	J. Harry Smith	17,659	7.74%
Republican	Thomas E. Boyle	16,708	7.32%
Republican	C. Marion Scipio	712	0.31%
Total votes		228,164	100.00%

=== General election ===
==== Candidates ====
- Victor F. Addonizio, assemblyman from Orange and brother of Hugh Addonizio (Democratic)
- William Barbetta (NJ Conservative)
- Marlo Carluccio (Essex Conservative)
- Joseph Carroll (Socialist Workers)
- Frank De George (NJ Conservative)
- Gerardo Del Tufo, former assemblyman from Newark (Republican)
- David W. Dowd, former mayor of Livingston (Republican)
- Nicholas Fernicola, incumbent senator since 1966 (Democratic)
- James H. Flynn (NJ Conservative)
- Joseph R. Garrity (Essex Conservative)
- John J. Giblin, incumbent senator since 1966 (Democratic)
- James Larry Giordano (Public Employee Candidate)
- Michael Giuliano, candidate for Assembly in 1965 (Republican)
- Maclyn Goldman, incumbent senator since 1966 (Democratic)
- Hutchins F. Inge, incumbent senator since 1966 (Democratic)
- John P. Keelan (Essex Conservative)
- James W. Lomker (Essex Conservative)
- David Mandelbaum, assemblyman from Maplewood (Democratic)
- Alexander Matturri, former chair of the Newark Housing Authority (Republican)
- William Murray (Essex Conservative)
- Edmund O. Matzal (Essex Conservative)
- Gladis P. Smith (NJ Conservative)
- Harrison P. Smith Jr. (NJ Conservative)
- Milton Waldor, West Orange attorney (Republican)
- James Wallwork, former assemblyman from Short Hills (Republican)

==== Results ====
District 11 (six seats)
Party	Candidate	Votes	%
Republican	Michael Giuliano	122,354	9.6
Republican	Gerardo Del Tufo	119,956	9.4
Republican	Alexander Matturri	119,152	9.3
Republican	James Wallwork	118,834	9.3
Republican	Milton Waldor	117,280	9.2
Republican	David W. Dowd	115,568	9.0
Democratic	Nicholas Fernicola (incumbent)	91,812	7.2
Democratic	John J. Giblin (incumbent)	89,297	7.0
Democratic	Maclyn Goldman (incumbent)	88,796	6.9
Democratic	David Mandelbaum	85,131	6.7
Democratic	Victor F. Addonizio	83,587	6.5
Democratic	Hutchins Inge (incumbent)	83,543	6.5
Conservative	John P. Keelan	5,196	0.4
Conservative	Marlo Carluccio	5,140	0.4
Conservative	William Murray	4,906	0.4
Conservative	Joseph R. Garrity	4,657	0.4
Conservative	Edmund O. Matzal	4,337	0.3
Conservative	James W. Lomker	4,096	0.3
Conservative	Harrison P. Smith Jr.	2,484	0.2
Independent	James Larry Giordano	2,427	0.2
Conservative	William Barbetta	2,412	0.2
Conservative	Gladis P. Smith	2,086	0.2
Conservative	James H. Flynn	1,987	0.2
Conservative	Frank De George	1,804	0.1
Socialist Workers	Joseph Carroll	1,507	0.1
Total votes		1,278,349	100.00%

== District 12 ==
=== Democratic primary ===
==== Candidates ====
- Frank J. Guarini, incumbent senator since 1966
- Frederick H. Hauser
- William F. Kelly Jr., incumbent senator since 1958
- William Musto, incumbent senator since 1966 and mayor of Union City

==== Results ====
1967 Democratic primary
Party	Candidate	Votes	%
Democratic	Frank J. Guarini (incumbent)	51,490	25.07%
Democratic	William Musto (incumbent)	51,447	25.05%
Democratic	William F. Kelly Jr. (incumbent)	51,322	24.99%
Democratic	Frederick H. Hauser	51,122	24.89%
Total votes		205,381	100.00%

=== Republican primary ===
==== Candidates ====
- Cresenzi Castaldo
- George G. Gaspar
- Geoffrey Gaulkin
- Eugene P. Kenny
- Edward T. Magee
- Frank S. Monaco
- Nora O'Malley
- Norman H. Roth

==== Results ====
1967 Republican primary
Party	Candidate	Votes	%
Republican	Cresenzi Castaldo	4,570	18.45%
Republican	Eugene P. Kenny	4,569	18.45%
Republican	George Gaulkin	4,561	18.42%
Republican	Norman H. Roth	4,525	18.27%
Republican	Edward T. Magee	1,697	6.85%
Republican	Frank S. Monaco	1,632	6.59%
Republican	Nora O'Malley	1,614	6.52%
Republican	George G. Gaspar	1,599	6.46%
Total votes		24,767	100.00%

=== General election ===
==== Candidates ====
- George Ahto (No Additional Taxes)
- Rita A. Bailey (NJ Conservative)
- Michael J. Bell (No Additional Taxes)
- Cresenzi Castaldo (Republican)
- George A. Dunn (NJ Conservative)
- Geoffrey Gaulkin (Republican)
- Frank J. Guarini, incumbent senator since 1966 (Democratic)
- Frederick H. Hauser (Democratic)
- William F. Kelly Jr., incumbent senator since 1958 (Democratic)
- Eugene P. Kenny (Republican)
- Gabriel M. Masters (NJ Conservative)
- William Musto, incumbent senator since 1966 and mayor of Union City (Democratic)
- Frank Potocnie (NJ Conservative)
- Norman H. Roth (Republican)
- James B. Sansone (No Additional Taxes)
- Allen Zavodnick (No Additional Taxes)

==== Results ====
District 12 (four seats)
Party	Candidate	Votes	%
Democratic	William Musto (incumbent)	115,534	16.6
Democratic	Frank Guarini (incumbent)	111,741	16.0
Democratic	William F. Kelly Jr. (incumbent)	111,331	16.0
Democratic	Frederick H. Hauser	110,949	15.9
Republican	Cresenzi Castaldo	39,667	5.7
Republican	Eugene P. Kenny	39,049	5.6
Republican	Norman H. Roth	38,985	5.6
Republican	Geoffrey Gaulkin	37,609	5.4
Independent	Michael J. Bell	24,777	3.6
Independent	James B. Sansone	19,713	2.8
Independent	Allen Zavodnick	19,106	2.7
Independent	George Ahto	19,046	2.7
Conservative	Frank Potocnie	2,467	0.4
Conservative	Rita A. Bailey	2,428	0.3
Conservative	Gabriel M. Masters	2,262	0.3
Conservative	George A. Dunn	2,239	0.3
Total votes			100.00%

== District 13 ==
=== Democratic primary ===
==== Candidates ====
- Gerald Calabrese, mayor of Cliffside Park
- Matthew Feldman, incumbent senator since 1966
- Alfred W. Kiefer, incumbent senator since 1966
- I. Richard Lapidus
- Jeremiah F. O'Connor, incumbent senator since 1966
- Ned J. Parsekian, incumbent senator since 1966

==== Results ====
1967 Democratic primary
Party	Candidate	Votes	%
Democratic	Jeremiah F. O'Connor (incumbent)	16,065	19.54%
Democratic	Matthew Feldman (incumbent)	16,001	19.46%
Democratic	Ned J. Parsekian (incumbent)	15,728	19.13%
Democratic	Alfred W. Kiefer (incumbent)	15,714	19.11%
Democratic	Gerald Calabrese	15,328	18.64%
Democratic	I. Richard Lapidus	3,382	4.11%
Total votes		82,218	100.00%

=== Republican primary ===
==== Candidates ====
- Fairleigh Dickinson Jr., businessman and philanthropist
- Garrett W. Hagedorn, mayor of Midland Park
- Willard B. Knowlton
- Alfred D. Schiaffo, Closter attorney
- Joseph C. Woodcock, assemblyman from Cliffside Park

==== Results ====
1967 Republican primary
Party	Candidate	Votes	%
Republican	Fairleigh Dickinson Jr.	27,792	20.06%
Republican	Alfred D. Schiaffo	27,773	20.05%
Republican	Garrett W. Hagedorn	27,769	20.05%
Republican	Joseph C. Woodcock	27,722	20.01%
Republican	Willard B. Knowlton	27,476	19.83%
Total votes		138,532	100.00%

=== General election ===
==== Candidates ====
- Gerald Calabrese, mayor of Cliffside Park (Democratic)
- Fairleigh Dickinson Jr., businessman and philanthropist (Republican)
- Matthew Feldman, incumbent senator since 1966 (Democratic)
- Garrett W. Hagedorn, mayor of Midland Park (Republican)
- William Craig Kennedy (NJ Conservative)
- Irving F. Kent (NJ Conservative)
- Alfred W. Kiefer, incumbent senator since 1966 (Democratic)
- Willard B. Knowlton (Republican)
- Thomas J. Moriarty (NJ Conservative)
- Frank Monte (NJ Conservative)
- John J. Murray (NJ Conservative)
- Jeremiah F. O'Connor, incumbent senator since 1966 (Democratic)
- Ned J. Parsekian, incumbent senator since 1966 (Democratic)
- Alfred D. Schiaffo, Closter attorney (Republican)
- Joseph C. Woodcock, assemblyman from Cliffside Park (Republican)

==== Results ====
District 13 (five seats)
Party	Candidate	Votes	%
Republican	Fairleigh Dickinson Jr.	191,260	13.1
Republican	Joseph C. Woodcock	177,982	12.2
Republican	Alfred D. Schiaffo	172,420	11.8
Republican	Garrett W. Hagedorn	171,596	11.8
Republican	Willard B. Knowlton	167,379	11.5
Democratic	Ned J. Parsekian (incumbent)	117,609	8.1
Democratic	Matthew Feldman (incumbent)	114,760	7.9
Democratic	Jeremiah F. O'Connor (incumbent)	113,888	7.8
Democratic	Gerald A. Calabrese	105,450	7.2
Democratic	Alfred W. Kiefer (incumbent)	104,869	7.2
Conservative	William Craig Kennedy	4,950	0.3
Conservative	Thomas J. Moriarty	4,724	0.3
Conservative	John J. Murray	4,402	0.3
Conservative	Irving F. Kent	4,172	0.3
Conservative	Frank Monte	4,154	0.3
Total votes			100.00%

== District 14 ==
=== Democratic primary ===
==== Candidates ====
- Charles J. Alfano
- Joseph A. Lazzara
- Joseph M. Keegan, incumbent senator since 1966

==== Results ====
1967 Democratic primary
Party	Candidate	Votes	%
Democratic	Joseph A. Lazzara	6,832	33.60%
Democratic	Joseph M. Keegan (incumbent)	6,800	33.44%
Democratic	Charles J. Alfano	6,700	32.95%
Total votes		20,332	100.00%

=== Republican primary ===
==== Candidates ====
- Ira Schoem
- Frank J. Sciro
- Edward Sisco

==== Results ====
1967 Republican primary
Party	Candidate	Votes	%
Republican	Edward Sisco	7,129	33.44%
Republican	Ira Schoem	7,121	33.41%
Republican	Frank J. Sciro	7,066	33.15%
Total votes		21,316	100.00%

=== General election ===
==== Candidates ====
- Charles J. Alfano (Democratic)
- Joseph A. Lazzara (Democratic)
- Joseph M. Keegan, incumbent senator since 1966 (Democratic)
- Ira Schoem (Republican)
- Frank J. Sciro (Republican)
- Edward Sisco (Republican)

==== Results ====
District 7 (three seats)
Party	Candidate	Votes	%
Republican	Ira Schoem	63,858	18.5
Republican	Frank J. Sciro	62,891	18.2
Republican	Edward Sisco	62,720	18.2
Democratic	Joseph A. Lazzara	55,552	16.1
Democratic	Joseph M. Keegan (incumbent)	50,375	14.6
Democratic	Charles J. Alfano	48,967	14.2
Socialist Labor	Harry Santhouse	771	0.2
Total votes			100.00%

== District 15 ==
=== Republican primary ===
==== Candidates ====
- Wayne Dumont, former senator and nominee for governor in 1965
- Milton Woolfenden Jr., incumbent senator since 1966

==== Results ====
1967 Republican primary
Party	Candidate	Votes	%
Republican	Wayne Dumont	10,246	54.73%
Republican	Milton Woolfenden (incumbent)	8,598	45.27%
Total votes		18,844	100.00%

=== Democratic primary ===
==== Candidates ====
- William R. Stem

==== Results ====
1967 Democratic primary
Party	Candidate	Votes	%
Democratic	William R. Stem	5,743	33.55%
Total votes		5,743	100.00%

=== General election ===
==== Candidates ====
- Wayne Dumont, former senator and nominee for governor in 1965 (Republican)
- William R. Stem (Democratic)

==== Results ====
District 15 (one seat)
Party	Candidate	Votes	%
Republican	Wayne Dumont	42,292	69.63
Democratic	William R. Stem	18,450	30.37
Total votes		60,742	100.00%
