= Politics of Essex County, New Jersey =

Essex County is New Jersey's largest county and its county seat, Newark, is New Jersey's largest city. Essex has been predominantly Democratic since the early 1970s. Essex was a politically competitive (swing) county for decades before that.

== Essex County Executive ==
In November 1977, Essex County voters approved a referendum to change the form of government and establish a new position of Essex County Executive.

1978-1987: Peter Shapiro (Democrat), Elected 1978. Re-elected 1982. Democratic nominee for Governor of New Jersey, 1985. Defeated for re-election, 1986.

1987-1991: Nicholas R. Amato (Republican), Elected 1986. Did not seek re-election in 1990.

1991-1994: Thomas D’Allesio (Democrat), Elected 1990. Resigned in 1994 following his conviction on federal extortion charges.

1995-2003: James W. Treffinger (Republican), Elected 1994. Re-elected 1998. Sought the Republican nomination for U.S. Senator in 2000 and 2002. Did not seek re-election in 2002.

2003-date: Joseph N. DiVincenzo, Jr. (Democrat), Elected 2002. Re-elected 2006, 2010 and 2014.

== Essex County Sheriff ==
The Sheriff is an elected countywide position, the top law enforcement officer in the county, established by the New Jersey Constitution.

1968-1971: Ralph D'Ambola (Republican), Elected 1967. Did not seek re-election in 1970.

1971-1980: John F. Cryan (Democrat), Elected 1967. Re-elected in 1970, 1973 and 1976. Defeated for re-election in 1979.

1980-1983: Chuck Cummings (Republican), Elected 1979. Defeated for re-election in 1982.

1982-1991: Thomas J. D'Alessio (Democrat), Elected 1982. Re-elected in 1985 and 1988. Resigned in January 1991 following his election as Essex County Executive.

1991-date: Armando Fountoura (Democrat), Elected 1991. Re-elected 1994, 1997, 2000, 2003, 2006, 2009 and 2012.

== Essex County Clerk ==
The Essex County Clerk is a constitutional office elected to a five-year term.

2006-date: Christopher J. Durkin (Democrat), Elected 2005, Re-elected 2010.

1996-2006: Patrick J. McNally, (Democrat) Elected 1995, Re-elected 2000. Did not seek re-election in 2005.

1991-1996: Patricia McGarry Drake (Democrat), Elected 1990. Defeated for re-election in the 1995 Democratic Primary.

1961-1991: Nicholas V. Caputo (Democrat), Elected 1960, Re-elected 1965, 1970, 1975, 1980 and 1985.

1956-1961: Anthony Giuliano (Republican), Elected 1955. Did not seek re-election in 1960, but instead ran for Register of Deeds and Mortgages.

1936-1956: Russell Gates, Republican, Elected 1935, Re-elected 1940, 1945, and 1950. Did not seek re-election in 1955.

== Essex County Surrogate ==
The Surrogate is an elected countywide position with a five-year term and acts essentially as the County Probate Court Judge.

1971: Thomas R. Farley (Republican), Appointed 1971. Defeated for a full five-year term by Nicholas R. Amato.

1971-1986: Nicholas R. Amato (Democrat), Elected 1971, Re-elected in 1976 and 1981. Amato switched parties and ran for re-election as a Republican in 1986 after Essex Democrats, at the urging of County Executive Peter Shapiro, denied him the organization line in the primary; he later switched races and defeated Shapiro in the County Executive race. Amato resigned as Surrogate to run for County Executive.

1987-1988: Earl Harris (Republican), Elected 1986. Died in office in 1988. Harris was a longtime Newark City Council President who joined the Republican ticket in 1986 to run with Amato. He defeated East Orange attorney Daniel Williams.

1988-90: Bob Cottle (Republican), Acting Surrogate following Harris' death. Defeated in General Election for full term in 1990.

1990-1993: Thomas P. Giblin (Democrat), Elected 1990. Resigned to seek the Democratic nomination for Essex County Executive.

1996-2012: Joseph P. Brennan, Jr. (Democrat), Elected 1996, Re-elected 2001 and 2006.

2012-date: Theodore N. Stevens II (Democrat), Elected in 2011.

== Essex County Register of Deeds and Mortgages ==
The Essex County Register of Deeds and Mortgages is an elected countywide position with a five-year term. Only Essex and Hudson still directly elect County Registers; the other counties have eliminated the post.

2015-date: Dana Rone (Democrat), Elected 2014. Rone is a former Newark City Councilwoman. She defeated Republican James Boydston with 74.4% of the vote.

2013-2014: William Narvaez (Democrat), became Acting Register following Thigpen's death and served until Rone took the oath of office in January 2015.

2010-2013: Philip Thigpen (Democrat), elected 2009. Thigpen, the Essex County Democratic chairman, became the replacement candidate for Register after the winner of the 2009 primary, Dwight C. Brown, died after the Democratic primary at age 62. Thigpen defeated Republican Terriann Moore-Abrams by a 69%-28% margin.

1995-2010: Carole A. Graves (Democrat), elected 1999, Re-elected 2004. Graves was the former president of the Newark Teachers Union. She was not a candidate for re-election in 2010.

1975-1995: Larrie W. Stalks (Democrat), Elected 1974, Re-elected 1979, 1984, 1989 and 1994. She was not a candidate for re-election in 1999. She defeated Republican John Taliaferro in 1974, and just narrowly won in 1979 against Republican Hymen B. Mintz. a former Assemblyman who had served as County Register from 1970 to 1975; Mintz had run on a single platform of eliminating the office.

1970-1975: Hymen B. Mintz (Republican), Elected 1969. Did not seek re-election in 1974.

1968-1970: Vacant

1960-1968: Madaline A. Williams (Democrat), Elected 1960, Re-elected 1965. Died in office in 1968.

1955-1960: Abbie W. Magee (Republican), Elected 1955.

== Essex County Democratic Committee Chairman ==
1953-1968: Dennis F. Carey; 1968-1978: Harry Lerner; 1978-1979: May Maher; 1979-1980: Horace Gausepohl; 1980-1992: Raymond M. Durkin; 1992-1993: Thomas J. D'Alessio; 1993-2002: Thomas P. Giblin; 2002-2004: Donald M. Payne; 2004-2013: Philip Thigpen; 2013-date: LeRoy J. Jones, Jr.

== Essex County Republican Committee Chairman ==
1971-1973: George M. Wallhauser, Jr.; 1973-1977: Frederic Remington; 1977-1982: John Renna; 1982-1983: James Piro; 1983-1986: Michael D. Francis; 1986-1996: John Renna; 1996-1997: Jeanne Parke; 1997-2011: Kevin J. O'Toole; 2011-date: Al Barlas.

== Congressmen from Essex County ==
=== 10th District of New Jersey ===
2012-date: Donald M. Payne, Jr. (Democrat), Elected 2012, Re-elected 2014. Payne was serving as an Essex County Freeholder and Newark City Councilman when he won a 2012 Special Election following the death of his father.

1989-2012: Donald M. Payne (Democrat), Elected 1988, Re-elected 1990, 1992, 1994, 1996, 1998, 2000, 2002, 2004, 2006, 2008 and 2010. Died in office in 2012. 1949-1989: Peter W. Rodino (Democrat), Elected 1948, Re-elected 1950, 1952, 1954, 1956, 1958, 1960, 1962, 1964, 1966, 1968, 1970, 1972, 1974, 1976, 1978, 1980, 1982, 1984 and 1986. Did not seek re-election to a 21st term in 1988. Rodino's predecessor, Republican Fred A. Hartley, Jr., was from Hudson County (Kearny).

=== 11th District of New Jersey ===
1963-1985: Joseph Minish (Democrat), Elected 1962, Re-elected 1964, 1966, 1968, 1970, 1972, 1974, 1976, 1978, 1980 and 1982. Defeated for re-election in 1984 by Assembly Minority Leader Dean Gallo, a Republican from Morris County (Parsippany).

1949-1963: Hugh Joseph Addonizio (Democrat), Elected 1948, Re-elected 1950, 1952, 1954, 1958 and 1960. Did not seek re-election in 1962, but instead ran for Mayor of Newark.

1943-1949: Frank Sundstrom (Republican), Elected 1942, Re-elected 1944 and 1946. Defeated for re-election by Addonizio.

1939-1943: Albert L. Vreeland (Republican), Elected 1938, Re-elected 1940. Did not seek re-election in 1942 but instead enlisted in the U.S. Army during World War II.

1937-1939: Edward L. O'Neill (Democrat), Elected 1936. Defeated for re-election in 1938 by Vreeland.

1931-1937: Peter Angelo Cavicchia (Republican), Elected 1930, Re-elected 1932 and 1934. Defeated for re-election in 1936 by O'Neill.

=== 12th District of New Jersey ===
1965-1966: Paul J. Krebs (Democrat), Elected 1964. Did not seek re-election in 1966 after his district was eliminated in redistricting.

1959-1965: George M. Wallhauser (Republican), Elected in 1958, Re-elected in 1960 and 1962. Did not seek re-election in 1964.

1939-1959: Robert W. Kean, (Republican), Elected 1938, Re-elected 1940, 1942, 1944, 1946, 1948, 1950, 1952, 1954 and 1956. Did not seek re-election in 1958, but instead was the Republican nominee for U.S. Senator.

1937-1939: Frank William Towey, Jr. (Democrat), Elected 1936. Defeated for re-election in 1938 by Kean.

1915-1937: Frederick R. Lehlbach (Republican), Elected 1914, Re-elected 1916, 1918, 1920, 1922, 1924, 1926, 1928, 1930, 1932 and 1934. Defeated for re-election in 1936 by Towey.

== State Senators from Essex County ==
=== 1926-1965 Elections ===
Until 1965, Essex County had one State Senator, elected in countywide elections:

1927-1935: Joseph G. Wolber (Republican), Elected 1926. Re-elected 1929 and 1932. Did not seek re-election in 1935 following his appointment as a New Jersey Circuit Court Judge.

1936-1938: Lester H. Clee (Republican), Elected 1935. Republican nominee for Governor of New Jersey, 1937. Did not seek re-election in 1938.

1939-1941: Homer C. Zink (Republican), Elected 1938. Elected by the legislature to serve as New Jersey State Controller in 1941.

1942-1947: Roy V. Wright (Republican), Elected 1941. Re-elected 1944. Did not seek re-election in 1947.

1948-53: Alfred C. Clapp (Republican), Elected 1947. Re-elected 1951. Resigned in 1953 to become a Superior Court Judge.

1953-55: Marc Anton (Republican), Elected 1953 (Special Election). Defeated for re-election, 1955.

1956-64: Donal C. Fox (Democrat), Elected 1955. Re-elected 1959. Did not seek re-election, 1963.

1964-66: C. Robert Sarcone (Republican). Elected 1963. Defeated for re-election, 1965.

=== 1965 Elections ===
The U.S. Supreme Court, in Reynolds v. Sims (more commonly known as One Man, One Vote), required redistricting by state legislatures for congressional districts to keep represented populations equal, as well as requiring both houses of state legislatures to have districts drawn that contained roughly equal populations, and to perform redistricting when needed. Because of its population, Essex County went from one state senate seat to four. In 1965, all four Essex Senators were elected countywide At-Large for a two-year term:

1966-1968: Nicholas T. Fernicola (Democrat), Elected 1965. Defeated for re-election, 1967.

1966-1968: Maclyn S. Goldman (Democrat), Elected 1965. Defeated for re-election, 1967.

1966-1968: John J. Giblin (Democrat), Elected 1965. Defeated for re-election, 1967.

1966-1968: Hutchins F. Inge (Democrat), Elected 1965. Defeated for re-election, 1967.

=== 1967 Elections ===
As New Jersey adjusted to One Man, One Vote, the state reapportioned the state senate again for the 1967 elections. Essex County went from four state senate seats to six. In 1967, all six Essex Senators were elected countywide At-Large for four-year terms:

1968-1982: James Wallwork (Republican), Elected 1967. Re-elected 1971, 1973 and 1977. Did not seek re-election in 1981, but instead sought the Republican nomination for Governor.

1968-1974: Michael Giuliano (Republican), Elected 1967. Re-elected 1971. Defeated for re-election, 1973.

1968-1971: David Dowd (Republican), Elected 1967. Resigned in 1971 to become General Counsel to the New Jersey Turnpike Authority.

1968-1972: Alexander Matturri (Republican), Elected 1967. Candidate for Mayor of Newark, 1970. Did not seek re-election in 1971.

1968-1972: Milton Waldor (Republican), Elected 1967. Defeated for re-election, 1971.

1968-1972: Gerardo Del Tufo (Republican), Elected 1967. Did not seek re-election in 1971, but instead was elected to the Essex County Board of Freeholders.

=== 1971 Elections ===
A Special Election was held in November 1971 to fill the unexpired term of Senator David Dowd (Republican), who had resigned to become General Counsel of the New Jersey Turnpike Authority. The seat was won by Democrat Charles B. DeMarco, who served in the Senate from November 1971 to January 1972.

Essex County lost one State Senate seat following Reapportionment for the 1971 general election, going from six seats to five seats. In 1971, all five Essex Senators were elected countywide At-Large for two-year terms.

Republican Senators James Wallwork and Michael Giuliano were re-elected. Waldor was defeated, and Democrats picked up the open seats being vacated by Matturri and Dowd.

1972-1999: Wynona Lipman (Democrat), Elected 1971. Re-elected 1973, 1977, 1981, 1983, 1987, 1991, 1993 and 1997. Died in office, 1999.

1972-1974: Ralph DeRose (Democrat), Elected 1971. Did not seek re-election in 1973, but instead sought the Democratic nomination for Governor.

1972-1982: Frank J. Dodd (Democrat), Elected 1971. Re-elected 1973 and 1977. Did not seek re-election in 1981, but instead sought the Democratic nomination for Governor.

=== 1973 Elections ===
For the first time, the state was to be divided into 40 legislative districts, with each district electing one state senator and two members of the General Assembly. The districts were drawn first to achieve a population balance (districts were drawn to be within +/- 4% of each other), and then to be as geographically compact as possible. Many districts included parts of several counties. Some districts had more than one incumbent.

Essex County was part of five legislative Districts:

==== District 25 ====
The predominantly Essex County-based 25th District included parts of suburban Western Essex County, as well as two towns in Morris County and Wayne in Passaic County. Wallwork (R-Short Hills) was the incumbent Senator. He was re-elected over Roseland Councilman Joel Wasserman.

==== District 26 ====
The all-Essex 26th District included East Orange, West Orange, and Orange. Dodd (D-West Orange) was the incumbent Senator. He was re-elected.

==== District 27 ====
The all-Essex 27th District was based in northeastern Essex County and included Montclair, Bloomfield and Nutley. The incumbent Senator was Giuliano (R-Bloomfield). He was defeated for re-election by Democrat Carmen Orechio, the mayor of Nutley.

==== District 28 ====
The all-Essex 28th District included part of Newark (West Ward), and Irvington and South Orange. The incumbent was DeRose (D-South Orange), who gave up his Senate seat to run for governor. The winner of the open seat was Democrat Martin L. Greenberg.

==== District 29 ====
The all-Essex 29th District was entirely in the City of Newark. Lipman (D-Newark) was the incumbent Senator. (Lipman had been a resident of Montclair, but moved to Newark to run in District 29.) She was re-elected.

==== District 30 ====
The 30th District included part of Newark (North Ward) and Belleville, and the Hudson County towns of Harrison and Kearny. There was no incumbent Senator. The winner of the open seat was Assemblyman Anthony Imperiale, who ran as an Independent.

=== 1977 Elections ===
Districts remained the same for the 1977 elections. All incumbents sought re-election.

==== District 25 ====
Wallwork was re-elected against Democrat Lewis J. Paper.

==== District 26 ====
Dodd was re-elected against Republican Nancy Jane Schron, the former East Orange City Council President.

==== District 27 ====
Orechio was re-elected against Republican Assemblyman John N. Dennis.

==== District 28 ====
Greenberg was re-elected against Republican James A. Pindar, a Roman Catholic Priest and a professor of communications at Seton Hall University.

==== District 29 ====
Lipman was re-elected against Republican Manuel Angel Colon.

==== District 30 ====
Imperiale was defeated in his bid for re-election to a second term in the Senate by Democrat Frank X. Rodgers, the longtime Mayor of Harrison, New Jersey.

=== 1979 Special Election ===
==== District 28 ====
Greenberg resigned from the Senate to return to his law practice and represent the new Golden Nugget Casino in Atlantic City. A special election was won by John Caufield, a Democrat and the Newark Fire Director.

=== 1981 Elections ===
The New Jersey Legislature faced redistricting following the 1980 census. Two Senators ran for governor, and two others sought re-election. Wallwork sought the Republican nomination for Governor and his old 25th district as eliminated. Some of the West Essex towns went into the 22nd district, which was shared with Union County, and others went to the 34th district, which was predominantly Passaic County.

==== District 27 ====
District 27, with some changes, was essentially the old 26th. Dodd gave up his Senate seat to seek the Democratic nomination for Governor. He was replaced by Assemblyman Richard Codey.

==== District 28 ====
Caufield was re-elected.

==== District 29 ====
Lipman was re-elected.

==== District 30 ====
District 30, with some changes, resembled the old 27th district. Orechio was re-elected narrowly against Bloomfield Councilman John Crecco.

=== 1983 Elections ===
Districts remained the same for the 1983 elections. All incumbents sought re-election.

==== District 27 ====
Codey was re-elected.

==== District 28 ====
Caufield was re-elected.

==== District 29 ====
Lipman was re-elected.

==== District 30 ====
Orechio was re-elected after an aggressive challenge from Republican Ralph J. Salerno.

=== 1979 Special Election ===
==== District 28 ====
Caufield died in office in 1986. Newark West Ward Councilman Ronald Rice won a special election to the state senate.

=== 1987 Elections ===
Districts remained the same for the 1987 elections. All incumbents sought re-election.

==== District 27 ====
Codey was re-elected.

==== District 28 ====
Rice was re-elected.

==== District 29 ====
Lipman was re-elected.

==== District 30 ====
Orechio was re-elected.

=== 1991 Elections ===
The New Jersey Legislature faced redistricting following the 1990 census. The Union County-based District 21 took on several West Essex towns, extending from Union Township to Cedar Grove. The 30th district was eliminated and most of the towns were reapportioned to the Passaic County-based 34th district and the Bergen County-based 36th district. Orechio was placed in the same district as another Democratic Senator, Gabriel Ambrosio, and chose not to seek re-election after 18 years in the Senate.

==== District 27 ====
Codey was re-elected.

==== District 28 ====
Rice was re-elected.

==== District 29 ====
Lipman was re-elected.

=== 1993 Elections ===
Districts remained the same for the 1993 elections. All incumbents sought re-election.

==== District 27 ====
Codey was re-elected.

==== District 28 ====
Rice was re-elected.

==== District 29 ====
Lipman was re-elected.

=== 1997 Elections ===
Districts remained the same for the 1997 elections. All incumbents sought re-election.

==== District 27 ====
Codey was re-elected.

==== District 28 ====
Rice was re-elected.

==== District 29 ====
Lipman was re-elected.

==== District 36 ====
Republican John P. Scott of Bergen County unseated Democratic Senator Gabriel Ambrosio, also of Bergen County, in 1991. Scott was re-elected in 1993. In 1997, Scott lost his Senate seat to an Essex County Democrat, Garry Furnari, the mayor of Nutley.

=== 1999 Special Election ===
==== District 29 ====
Lipman died in office. Newark Mayor Sharpe James won a special election convention to replace her in the New Jersey State Senate.

=== 2001 Special Election ===
==== District 21 ====
Republican state senator C. Louis Bassano of Union County resigned from the Senate in 2001 to take a job at the New Jersey Sports and Exposition Authority. An Essex County Republican, Assemblyman Kevin O'Toole of Cedar Grove, won a Special Election Convention to fill the remainder of Bassano's term.

=== 2001 Elections ===
The New Jersey Legislature faced redistricting following the 2000 census.

==== District 27 ====
Codey was re-elected in a new district that lost East Orange but picked up suburban West Essex towns.

==== District 28 ====
Rice was re-elected in a new district that added Bloomfield. He defeated Republican Assemblywoman Marion Crecco.

==== District 29 ====
James was re-elected.

==== District 34 ====
The new 34th district went from Leans Republican to Safe Democratic by removing GOP towns like Wayne in Passaic County and replacing them with two Democratic Essex strongholds, East Orange and Montclair. The incumbent Republican Senator, Norman Robertson, lost to Assemblywoman Nia Gill, a Democrat from Montclair.

==== District 40 ====
O'Toole's Essex-Union 21st district was eliminated; O'Toole's hometown, Cedar Grove, was added to the Bergen/Passaic 40th district. Instead of running for re-election to the state senate, O'Toole returned to the Assembly.

== Mayor of Newark ==
Newark is New Jersey's largest city. Mayors are elected for four-year terms in May non-partisan elections.

1953-1962: Leo P. Carlin, elected 1953, under Newark's old Commissioner form of government. Elected in 1954 as the first mayor of Newark to be directly elected by voters. Re-elected in 1958.

1962-1970: Hugh Joseph Addonizio, Elected 1962, Re-elected 1966. Addonizio gave up his seat in Congress after seven terms to challenge Mayor Leo Carlin in 1962.

1970-1986: Kenneth A. Gibson, Elected 1970, Re-elected 1974, 1978 and 1982. Gibson defeated Addonizio in a runoff election, 54,892 (55.88%) to 43,339 (44.12%), becoming Newark's first Black Mayor. Re-elected in 1974 against State Sen. Anthony Imperiale, 42,870 (54.30%) to 34,502 (43.70%). He was unopposed in 1978; in 1982, he defeated City Council President Earl Harris, 20,682 (40.68%) to 16,988 (33.42%).

1986-2006: Sharpe James, Elected 1986, Re-elected 1990, 1994, 1998 and 2002. James defeated Gibson, 27,459 (55.57%) to 19,894 (40.26%). In his final campaign, he defeated City Councilman Cory Booker, 28,363 (52.95%) to 24,869 (46.42%). He was not a candidate for re-election in 2006.

2006-2013: Cory Booker, Elected 2006, Re-elected 2010.

2013-2014: Luis Quintana. As city council president, he succeeded to the mayoralty after Booker resigned to take his seat in the U.S. Senate. He was not a candidate for mayor in 2014.

2014-date: Ras Baraka, Elected 2014.

== Mayor of East Orange ==
East Orange is New Jersey's 10th largest city. Mayors are elected for four-year terms in November partisan elections held in gubernatorial years. Because East Orange is so overwhelmingly Democratic, the June primary is tantamount to election.

2014-date: Lester M. Taylor, Elected 2014, defeating Bowser in the Democratic Primary; 1994-2014: Robert L. Bowser; 1990-1994: Cardell Cooper; 1986-1990: John C. Hatcher, Jr.; 1978-1986: Thomas H. Cooke, Jr.; 1970-1978: William Stanford Hart, Sr.; 1958-1970: James W. Kelly, Jr.; 1952-1958: William M. McConnell; 1918-1952: Charles Henry Martens; 1914-1918: Julian Arthur Gregory; 1911-1914: Worrall Frederick Mountain; 1905-1911: William Cardwell; 1899-1905: Edward Everett Bruen.

== Mayor of Irvington ==
Irvington is an urban city in Essex County that adjoins Newark with a population of 53,926. Mayors are elected in May non-partisan elections held in even-numbered non-presidential years for a four-year term.

1938-1938: Percy H. Miller, Jr. 1974-1982: Robert H. Miller, Elected 1974, Re-elected 1978. Did not seek re-election in 1982. 1994-2002: Sara Bost, Elected 1994, Re-elected 1998. Did not seek re-election following 2002 federal corruption indictment. 2002-2014: Wayne Smith, Elected 2002, Re-elected 2006 and 2010. 2014-date: Tony Vauss. Defeated Smith in 2014.

== Mayor of Nutley ==
Nutley is a municipality in Northeastern Essex County. Nutley elects five commissioners in May non-partisan elections held in presidential years for a four-year term. Traditionally the top vote getter is the mayor.

List of mayors of Nutley, New Jersey
