= 1965 New Jersey Senate election =

1965 New Jersey Senate elections
- November 2, 1965

All 29 seats in the New Jersey State Senate 15 seats needed for a majority
- Turnout: 73% (▲3pp)

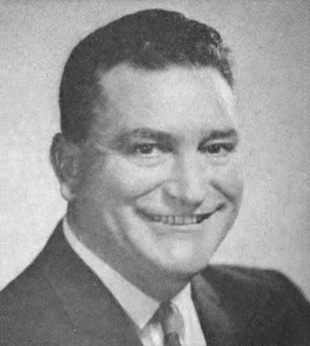
	Majority party	Minority party
Leader	John A. Lynch Sr.	Charles W. Sandman (not running)
Party	Democratic	Republican
Leader's seat	7th district (New Brunswick)	1st district (Lower Township)
Last election	6	15
Seats before	6	13
Seats won	19	10
Seat change	▲13	▼3
Popular vote	2,894,155	2,394,089
Senate President before election
Charles Sandman
Republican
Elected Senate President
John A. Lynch Sr.
Democratic

The 1965 New Jersey Senate elections were held on November 2.

The elections were the first held after the Supreme Court's Reynolds v. Sims decision, which held that New Jersey's single-seat county apportionment was unconstitutional. The ruling forced New Jersey to grant multiple seats to its largest counties (and eventually, switch to single-member districts that did not follow county lines).

The election also coincided with a landslide re-election victory for Democratic governor Richard J. Hughes. The result was a majority for the Democratic Party, the first since 1915.

== Background ==
=== Reapportioning ===
Until 1965, the New Jersey State Senate was composed of 21 senators, with each county electing one senator. After the U.S. Supreme Court decision Reynolds v. Sims required legislative districts to be approximately equal in population (a principle known as "one man, one vote"), New Jersey entered a decade-long period of reapportionment.

The overall effect of the reapportioning was to reduce representation for rural counties and increase representation for more populous urban counties, bringing the per person population closer to parity.

In 1965, the Senate was increased to 29 members, with larger counties given multiple seats and some smaller counties sharing one or two senators:

County	1965 District	#	∆
Atlantic	1	2	▼1
Cape May	1	2	▼1
Gloucester	1	2	▼1
Cumberland	2	1	▼1
Salem	2	1	▼1
Camden	3	2	▲1
Burlington	4	1	Steady
Monmouth	5	2	Steady
Ocean	5	2	Steady
Mercer	6	1	Steady
Middlesex	7	2	▲1
Hunterdon	8	1	▼1
Somerset	8	1	▼1
Union	9	2	▲1
Morris	10	2	▼1
Sussex	10	2	▼1
Warren	10	2	▼1
Essex	11	4	▲3
Hudson	12	3	▲2
Bergen	13	4	▲3
Passaic	14	2	▲1

== Incumbents not running for re-election ==
=== Democratic ===
- Robert H. Weber (District 2) (managed John Waddington's campaign)

=== Republican ===
- Charles W. Sandman (District 1) (ran for Governor)
- W. Steelman Mathis (District 5)
- Wayne Dumont (District 10) (ran for Governor)

== Summary of results by State Senate District ==
County	Incumbent	Party	New District	Elected Senator	Party
Atlantic	Frank S. Farley	Rep	District 1	John E. Hunt	Rep
Cape May	Charles W. Sandman	Rep	District 1	Frank S. Farley	Rep
Gloucester	John E. Hunt	Rep	District 1	Seat eliminated	
Cumberland	Robert H. Weber	Dem	District 2	John A. Waddington	Dem
Salem	John A. Waddington	Dem	District 2	Seat eliminated	
Camden	Frederick J. Scholz	Rep	District 3	Frederick J. Scholz	Rep
Camden	New seat		District 3	A. Donald Bigley	Dem
Burlington	Edwin B. Forsythe	Rep	District 4	Edwin B. Forsythe	Rep
Monmouth	Richard R. Stout	Rep	District 5	Richard R. Stout	Rep
Ocean	W. Steelman Mathis	Rep	District 5	William T. Hiering	Rep
Mercer	Sido L. Ridolfi	Dem	District 6	Sido L. Ridolfi	Dem
Middlesex	John A. Lynch	Dem	District 7	John A. Lynch	Dem
Middlesex	New seat		District 7	J. Edward Crabiel	Dem
Hunterdon	Vacant (Note: The seat was vacant following the death of Senator Raymond E. Bowkley in April 1965.)		District 8	William E. Ozzard	Rep
Somerset	William E. Ozzard	Rep	District 8	Seat eliminated	
Union	Nelson F. Stamler	Rep	District 9	Nelson F. Stamler	Rep
Union	New seat		District 9	Mildred Barry Hughes	Dem
Morris	Thomas J. Hillery	Rep	District 10	Thomas J. Hillery	Rep
Sussex	Vacant (Note: The seat was vacant following the resignation of Senator George B. Harper, who resigned in 1964 to take office as New Jersey Auditor.)		District 10	Milton Woolfenden	Rep
Warren	Wayne Dumont	Rep	District 10	Seat eliminated	
Essex	C. Robert Sarcone	Rep	District 11	Nicholas Fernicola	Dem
Essex	New seat		District 11	Macyln Goldman	Dem
Essex	New seat		District 11	John J. Giblin	Dem
Essex	New seat		District 11	Hutchins Inge	Dem
Hudson	William F. Kelly	Dem	District 12	William Musto	Dem
Hudson	New seat		District 12	William F. Kelly	Dem
Hudson	New seat		District 12	Frank Guarini	Dem
Bergen	Pierce H. Deamer Jr.	Rep	District 13	Ned Parsekian	Dem
Bergen	New seat		District 13	Matt Feldman	Dem
Bergen	New seat		District 13	Jeremiah F. O'Connor	Dem
Bergen	New seat		District 13	Alfred W. Kiefer	Dem
Passaic	Anthony J. Grossi	Dem	District 14	Anthony J. Grossi	Dem
Passaic	New seat		District 14	Joseph M. Keegan	Dem

=== Close races ===
Districts where the difference of total votes between the top two parties was under 10%:

1. District 1, 7.5%
2. District 3, 0.8% gain D
3. District 4, 5.38%
4. District 8, 0.6%
5. District 9, 4.6% gain D
6. District 11, 9.3% gain
7. District 13, 3.7% gain

== District 1 ==
District 1 (two seats)
Party	Candidate	Votes	%
Republican	John E. Hunt (incumbent)	75,373	27.9%
Republican	Frank S. Farley (incumbent)	69,767	25.8%
Democratic	Leo T. Clark	65,059	24.1%
Democratic	Edward Savage	59,959	22.2%
Socialist Labor	George Frenoy, Jr.	271	0.1
Total votes			100.00%

== District 2 ==
District 2 (one seat)
Party	Candidate	Votes	%
Democratic	John A. Waddington (incumbent)	32,292	56.97%
Republican	John J. Spoltore	24,390	43.03%
Total votes		56,682	100.00%

== District 3 ==
District 3 (two seats)
Party	Candidate	Votes	%
Republican	Frederick J. Scholz	66,509	25.8%
Democratic	A. Donald Bigley	62,396	24.2%
Democratic	Alfred R. Pierce	61,285	23.8%
Republican	John H. Mohrfeld III	59,359	23.0%
Independent	Francis J. Werner	5,252	2.0
Independent	Joseph E. Reilly	1,891	0.7
Socialist Labor	Dominic W. Doganiero	933	0.4
Total votes			100.00%

== District 4 ==
District 4 (one seat)
Party	Candidate	Votes	%
Republican	Edwin B. Forsythe	34,098	52.69%
Democratic	George H. Barbour	30,617	47.31%
Total votes		64,715	100.00%

== District 5 ==
District 4 (one seat)
Party	Candidate	Votes	%
Republican	Richard R. Stout	99,688	28.4%
Republican	William T. Hiering	95,282	27.2%
Democratic	John J. Reilly	80,832	23.1%
Democratic	Thomas J. Muccifori	74,857	21.2%
Total votes		350,659	100.00%

== District 6 ==
1965 general election
Party	Candidate	Votes	%
Democratic	Sido L. Ridolfi (incumbent)	56,231	62.2%
Republican	William E. Schluter	33,821	37.4%
Socialist Labor	Joseph J. Frank	284	0.3%
Total votes		90,336	100.00%

== District 7 ==
1965 general election
Party	Candidate	Votes	%
Democratic	John A. Lynch (incumbent)	114,955	34.2%
Democratic	J. Edward Crabiel	111,893	33.3%
Republican	Edgar Hellriegel	55,154	16.4%
Republican	Albert L. Ichel	54,470	16.2%
Total votes		336,472	100.00%

== District 8 ==
1965 general election
Party	Candidate	Votes	%
Republican	William E. Ozzard (incumbent)	39,596	50.3%
Democratic	Arthur S. Meredith	39,185	49.7%
Total votes		78,781	100.0

== District 9 ==
1965 general election
Party	Candidate	Votes	%
Republican	Nelson Stamler (incumbent)	99,327	27.4%
Democratic	Mildred Barry Hughes	92,102	25.4%
Republican	Peter McDonough	90,261	24.9%
Democratic	William P. Hourihan	81,226	22.4%
Total votes		362,916	100.00%

== District 10 ==
1965 general election
Party	Candidate	Votes	%
Republican	Thomas J. Hillery (incumbent)	89,839	31.4%
Republican	Milton Woolfenden Jr.	85,192	29.8%
Democratic	Ruth C. Mitchell	57,038	20.0%
Democratic	Irene Mackey Smith	53,823	18.8%
Total votes		285,892	100.00%

== District 11 ==
1965 general election
Party	Candidate	Votes	%
Democratic	Nicholas Fernicola	145,589	13.7%
Democratic	Maclyn Goldman	143,795	13.5%
Democratic	John J. Giblin	143,040	13.4%
Democratic	Hutchins F. Inge	135,959	12.8%
Republican	C. Robert Sarcone (incumbent)	128,815	12.1%
Republican	Irwin I. Kimmelman	116,205	10.9%
Republican	James E. Churchman, Jr.	112,995	10.6%
Republican	William F. Tompkins	112,128	10.5%
Independent	George C. Richardson (Note: Richardson, Stephenson, Blumgart, and Waring ran on the "United Political Freedom" line.)	10,409	1.0%
Independent	Kenrick O. Stephenson	5,970	0.6%
Independent	David Blumgart	5,305	0.5%
Independent	Fredrick Waring	4,476	0.4%
Total votes		1,064,686	100.00%

== District 12 ==
1965 general election
Party	Candidate	Votes	%
Democratic	William Musto	154,183	24.7%
Democratic	William F. Kelly Jr. (incumbent)	152,975	24.6%
Democratic	Frank Guarini	152,263	24.4%
Republican	William Bozzuffi	52,363	8.4%
Republican	John J. Grossi, Jr.	51,891	8.3%
Republican	Victoria Borsett	50,649	8.1%
Independent	James C. Lynch (Note: Lynch, Waiss, and Mason ran on "The New Frontier" line.)	3,204	0.5%
Independent	Beatrice Waiss	2,772	0.4%
Independent	Willie Mae Mason	2,741	0.4%
Total votes		623,041	100.00%

== District 13 ==
1965 general election
Party	Candidate	Votes	%
Democratic	Ned J. Parsekian	174,438	14.1%
Democratic	Matthew Feldman	159,236	12.9%
Democratic	Jeremiah F. O'Connor	156,888	12.7%
Democratic	Alfred W. Kiefer	152,844	12.4%
Republican	Peter Moraites	148,092	12.0%
Republican	Marion West Higgins	148,035	12.0%
Republican	Arthur W. Vervaet	144,890	11.7%
Republican	Nelson G. Gross	143,532	11.6%
Conservative	Thomas J. Moriarty	4,408	0.4%
Independent	Louis Berns (Note: Berns ran on the "Fusion" line.)	1,256	0.1%
Total votes		1,233,619	100.00%

== District 14 ==
1965 general election
Party	Candidate	Votes	%
Democratic	Anthony J. Grossi (incumbent)	75,497	28.8%
Democratic	Joseph M. Keegan	73,698	28.1%
Republican	Arthur J. Sullivan	57,326	21.9%
Republican	John F. Evers	55,042	21.0%
Socialist Labor	Harry Santhouse	442	0.2%
Total votes		262,005	100.00%
