= James Wallwork =

American politician (1930–2024)

James H. Wallwork

Member of the New Jersey Senate
- In office January 9, 1968 – January 10, 1982
- Preceded by: Multi-member district
- Succeeded by: John H. Dorsey
- Constituency: 11th District (at-large) (1968–1974); 25th District (1974–1982)

Member of the New Jersey General Assembly from Essex County
- In office January 14, 1964 – January 11, 1966

Personal details
- Born: September 17, 1930 East Orange, New Jersey, U.S.
- Died: October 23, 2024 (aged 94) Bethesda, Maryland, U.S.
- Spouse: Lark Lataner
- Education: U.S. Military Academy (1952)

James Harold Wallwork (September 17, 1930 – October 23, 2024) was an American Republican Party politician who served in both houses of the New Jersey Legislature and twice sought the Republican nomination for Governor.

== Early life and military career ==
Wallwork was born September 17, 1930, in East Orange, New Jersey, or Belleville, the son of J. Harold Wallwork (1904–1985) and Lorraine Cameron Klick Wallwork (1905–1993). He grew up in Montclair, New Jersey, graduated from Montclair High School in 1948 and was a 1952 graduate of the United States Military Academy at West Point. He was 13th in his class of 525. He attended the General Staff War College, where he finished first in his class of 400, and the Army Engineering School. He was the Company Commander of a Combat Engineer Company with the Army of Occupation in Germany. After he left active duty, he served as a Major in the Army National Guard.

He was an owner of Wallwork Bros., a plumbing, heating and refrigeration supply company, a family business started by his grandfather.

== Political career ==
Wallwork was elected to the Republican County Committee in Montclair in 1957, and served as an aide to Assemblyman C. Robert Sarcone, the Assembly Minority Leader, in 1963. He was later a resident of the Short Hills section of Millburn, New Jersey.

=== General Assembly ===
He was elected to the New Jersey General Assembly in 1963, winning one of nine at-large seats. In 1965, he lost his bid for re-election to a second term, the casualty of Democratic Governor Richard J. Hughes's landslide re-election.

=== State Senate ===
Wallwork ran for the New Jersey Senate in 1967. He won a hotly contested primary on a Reform Republican slate, finishing first in a field of thirteen candidates for six Senate seats elected at-Large in Essex County. The General Election turned out to be a strong environment for Republicans; it was the mid-term election of Governor Richard J. Hughes's second term. Republicans won all six Senate seats, with Wallwork running fourth. The four Democratic Senators elected in 1965 -- Nicholas Fernicola, John J. Giblin, Maclyn Goldman and Hutchins Inge—were all defeated.

With Republicans taking control of the Legislature in 1967, Wallwork was initially slated to serve as the new Majority Leader. But the Essex County Republican Chairman, William Yeomans, refused to support him, a move that essentially blackballed Wallwork from the leadership post. Instead, Frank X. McDermott. a freshman Senator from Union County, became Majority Leader.

==== 1967 Republican State Senate primary results ====
Winner	Votes	Loser	Votes
James Wallwork	21,156	Frederic Remington	19,087
Gerardo Del Tufo	19,889	Jack J. Soriano	18,668
Alexander Matturri	19,723	Irwin I. Kimmelman	18,525
David W. Dowd	19,324	Frank L. Bate	18,225
Michael Giuliano	19,245	J. Harry Smith	17,659
Milton Waldor	19,243	Thomas E. Boyle	35,517
		C. Marion Scipio	712

==== 1967 Essex County state senate general election results ====
Winner	Party	Votes	Loser	Party	Votes
Michael Giuliano	Republican	122,354	Nicholas Fernicola	Democrat	91,812
Gerado Del Tufo	Republican	119,956	John J. Giblin	Democrat	89,297
Alexander Matturri	Republican	119,152	Maclyn Goldman	Democrat	88,796
James Wallwork	Republican	118,834	David Mandelbaum	Democrat	85,131
Milton Waldor	Republican	117,280	Victor Addonizio	Democrat	83,587
David W. Dowd	Republican	115,568	Hutchins Inge	Democrat	83,543

In 1971, redistricting reduced the number of Essex County Senate seats from six to five, all elected At-Large countywide. Wallwork finished third in the General Election, a race where Democrats won three of the five Senate seats. He finished more than 6,000 votes ahead of Democrat Martin Greenberg.

=== 1971 Essex County state senate general election results ===
Winner	Party	Votes	Loser	Party	Votes
Michael Giuliano	Republican	92,166	Milton Waldor	Republican	84,736
Ralph DeRose	Democrat	91,380	Martin L. Greenberg	Democrat	82,291
James Wallwork	Republican	88,632	Matthew G. Carter	Republican	77,418
Frank J. Dodd	Democrat	86,041	Henry W. Smolen	Democrat	76,190
Wynona Lipman	Democrat	85,644	Frederic Remington	Republican	73,663
			John J. Giblin	Essex Bi-Partisan	21,688
			John F. Monica	Essex Bi-Partisan	21,072
			Sylvester L. Casta	Essex Bi-Partisan	19,015
			Joseph J. Bradley	Essex Bi-Partisan	16,348
			Richard P. Weitzman	Essex Bi-Partisan	15,733
			Joseph A. Santiago	Unity-Victory-Progress	5,483

Another round of redistricting came in 1973 when the 25th Legislative District was created. For the first time, the state was divided into 40 legislative districts, each with one Senator and two Assemblymen. His running mate was Assemblyman, later Governor, Thomas Kean. In a Democratic landslide year, Wallwork defeated Roseland Councilman Joel Wasserman by 4,774 votes, 30,552 (54.24%) to 25,778 (45.76%).

He was re-elected in 1977 against Democrat Lewis J. Paper, a former U.S. Senate aide and White House intern. Wallwork won by 12,421 votes, 35,517 (60.60%) to 23,096 (39.40%).

Wallwork served as the Senate Minority Whip in 1978 and 1979, and as the Assistant Minority Leader in 1980 and 1981.

== Candidate for Governor of New Jersey ==
Wallwork sought the Republican nomination for Governor of New Jersey in 1981, but finished fourth in the Republican primary with 16% of the vote. He lost to Kean, who won the general election. During the campaign, Wallwork was reported to be the subject of an attempted assassination at a Veterans Administration hospital by a gunman disguised as a surgeon. The incident was determined by the FBI to be a hoax. In an unrelated indictment, federal prosecutors stated that the hospital chief of security had staged the attempt.

=== Results of the 1981 Republican primary for Governor of New Jersey ===
Thomas Kean	Former Assembly Speaker	122,512	31%
Pat Kramer	Former Mayor of Paterson	83,565	21%
Bo Sullivan	Businessman	67,651	17%
James Wallwork	State Senator	61,816	16%
Barry T. Parker	State Senator	26,040	7%
Anthony Imperiale	State Assemblyman	18,452	5%
John K. Rafferty	Mayor of Hamilton	12,837	3%
Richard McGlynn	Former Superior Court Judge	5,486	1%

On March 2, 1993, Wallwork made a late and surprising entrance into the 1993 Republican gubernatorial primary. The two leading candidates, both moderates, former New Jersey Board of Public Utilities President Christine Todd Whitman and former New Jersey Attorney General W. Cary Edwards, were being hammered after admitting that they had hired undocumented aliens as domestic workers in their homes. his was an issue in early 1993, after President Clinton's first two nominees for U.S. Attorney General, Zoe Baird and Kimba Wood, were forced to withdraw their nominations after admitting that they hired undocumented aliens as nannies. Wallwork billed himself as a conservative businessman, and pledged to "repeal every dime" of Governor Jim Florio's $2.8 billion tax increase.

Wallwork was hampered by his late start. He admitted at his announcement that his campaign had just two staffers and that he had not yet raised enough to air his first television commercial. "He's just not that well known. He's deficient in name recognition, political base, support among county leadership, and I honestly don't know whether he can become a major candidate," Cliff Zukin, a professor of political science at the Eagleton Institute of Politics at Rutgers University told The New York Times. He finished third, with 24% of the vote, and carried only Atlantic County.

=== Results of the 1993 Republican primary for Governor of New Jersey ===
Christine Todd Whitman	Former President of the Board of Public Utilities	159,765	40%
W. Cary Edwards	Former Attorney General	131,587	33%
James Wallwork	Former State Senator	96,034	24%
Charles Hoffman	Former State Senator	6,695	2%
J. Patrick Gilligan	Former State Senator	5,733	1%

== Waterfront Commissioner ==
Governor Christine Todd Whitman appointed Wallwork to serve as the Commissioner for New Jersey on the Waterfront Commission of New York Harbor.

== Personal life and death ==
In 1965, Wallwork married Lark Lataner of Orange, New Jersey. They had one daughter, Lyric Wallwork Winik, a book and magazine writer. His son-in-law is historian Jay Winik, the author of the New York Times #1 bestseller April 1865 (2001). Following his retirement from his business, he lived in Far Hills, New Jersey before relocating to Chevy Chase, Maryland.

Wallwork died in Bethesda on October 23, 2024, at the age of 94.

== Electoral history ==
Office	Year	Republican	Votes	Democrat	Votes
State Assembly	1963	James H. Wallwork	109,278	John J. Miller, Jr.	107,093
State Assembly	1965	James H. Wallwork	114,709	David Mandelbaum	140,712
State Senate	1967	James H. Wallwork	118,834	David Mandelbaum	85,131
State Senate	1971	James H. Wallwork	88,632	Martin L. Greenberg	82,291
State Senate	1973	James H. Wallwork	30,552	Joel Wasserman	25,778
State Senate	1977	James H. Wallwork	35,517	Lewis J. Paper	23,096
