= Alexander Matturri =

American politician and jurist (1913-1992)

Alexander J. Matturri

Member of the New Jersey Senate from the 11th District (at-large)
- In office January 9, 1968 – January 11, 1972
- Preceded by: Multi-member district
- Succeeded by: Multi-member district

Judge of New Jersey Superior Court
- In office 1972–1983

Personal details
- Born: Alexander J. Matturri; November 28, 1913 Newark, New Jersey, U.S.
- Died: January 14, 1992 (aged 78) Palm Beach, Florida, U.S.
- Party: Republican
- Education: University of Virginia, Rutgers University Law School

Alexander J. Matturri (November 28, 1913 – January 14, 1992) was an American Republican Party politician and jurist who served in the New Jersey State Senate from 1968 to 1972.

== Early life ==
Matturri was one of eight children born to Nicholas and Imaculata Matturri on November 28, 1913, in Newark, New Jersey. He attended Central High School, the University of Virginia, and Rutgers University Law School. He practiced law in Newark.

== Candidate for U.S. Congress ==
In 1952, Matturi was the Republican candidate for the U.S. House of Representatives in New Jersey's 10th district. He was seeking to unseat Peter W. Rodino, then a two-term Congressman. Rodino beat Matturri, 78,612 (56.87%) to 57,740 (41.77%).

== New Jersey State Senator ==
Matturri ran for the New Jersey State Senate in 1967. He won a hotly contested primary, finishing third in a field of thirteen candidates for six Senate seats elected At-Large in Essex County. The General Election turned out to be a strong environment for Republicans; it was the mid-term election of Governor Richard J. Hughes's second term. Republicans won all six Senate seats, with Matturri running third. The four Democratic Senators elected in 1965 -- Nicholas Fernicola, John J. Giblin, Maclyn Goldman and Hutchins Inge—were all defeated.

As a State Senator, Matturri served on the Senate Judiciary Committee and the Senate State Government Committee. He also served on the Senate Administrative Committee on the Introduction of Bills.

== Candidate for Mayor of Newark ==
In 1970, Matturri became a candidate for Mayor of Newark, New Jersey, in the May Non-Partisan election. The two-term incumbent, Hugh Joseph Addonizio, was seeking re-election in a city that was experiencing extraordinary social unrest. The 1967 Newark riots were a major civil disturbance in Newark between July 12 and July 17, 1967. The five days of rioting, looting, and destruction left 26 dead and hundreds injured. In the period leading up to the riots, police racial profiling, redlining, and lack of opportunity in education, training, and jobs led local African-American residents to feel powerless and disenfranchised. In particular, many felt they had been largely excluded from meaningful political representation and often suffered police brutality.

Unemployment and poverty were also very high with the traditional manufacturing base having been fully eroded and withdrawn from the Northeast US by 1967. Further fueling tensions was the final decision by the state of New Jersey to clear a vast tract of land in the central ward of its tenement buildings displacing thousands, to build the new University of Medicine and Dentistry facility.

A study on the riot, many African Americans, especially younger community leaders, felt they had remained largely disenfranchised in Newark despite the fact that Newark became one of the first majority black major cities in America alongside Washington, D.C. The city was entering a turbulent period of incipient change in political power. A former seven-term congressman representing New Jersey's 11th congressional district, Mayor Addonizio, who was also the last non-black mayor of Newark, took few steps to incorporate blacks in various civil leadership positions and to help blacks get better employment opportunities. Black leaders were increasingly upset that the Newark Police Department was dominated by white officers who would routinely stop and question black youths with or without provocation.

Five other challengers to Addonizio emerged: Kenneth A. Gibson, a 37-year-old engineer who finished third in the 1966 mayoral race; City Councilman Anthony Imperiale, who organized vigilante patrols during the riots; Newark Fire Director John Caufield; former Assemblyman George C. Richardson, and Harry Wheeler. Of the seven candidates, four where white (Addonizio, Matturri, Imperiale and Caufield) and three were black (Gibson, Richardson and Wheeler).

Matturri won the endorsement of former two-term mayor Leo P. Carlin, who had lost to Addonizio in 1962 and 1966.

Matturri finished a weak fifth in the May election, with Gibson leading Addonizio by 19,741 votes, 37,666 (42.72%) to 17,925 (20.33%). Imperiale finished third with 13,904 (15.77%), followed by: Caufield, 11,752 (13.33%); Matturri, 4,752 (5.39%); Richardson, 2,024 (2.30%) ; and Wheeler, 140 (0.16%). Gibson defeated Addonizio in the June runoff.

== Superior Court Judge ==
Redistricting following the 1970 census reduced Essex County's representation in the Senate from six seats to five. Matturri did not seek re-election to a second term as a State Senator.

In 1972, Governor William Cahill appointed Matturi to serve as a New Jersey Superior Court Judge. He served on the bench until his retirement in 1983.

== Later life ==
Matturri moved out of Newark in 1972, relocating to Deal, New Jersey, on the New Jersey shore. After his retirement, he lived in Palm Beach, Florida, where he died in 1992 at age 80.

=== Electoral history ===
==== 1967 Republican State Senate Primary Results ====
Winner	Votes	Loser	Votes
James Wallwork	21,156	Frederic Remington	19,087
Gerardo Del Tufo	19,889	Jack J. Soriano	18,668
Alexander Matturri	19,723	Irwin I. Kimmelman	18,525
David W. Dowd	19,324	Frank L. Bate	18,225
Michael Giuliano	19,245	J. Harry Smith	17,659
Milton Waldor	19,243	Thomas E. Boyle	35,517
		C. Marion Scipio	712

==== 1967 Essex County State Senator General Election Results ====
Winner	Party	Votes	Loser	Party	Votes
Michael Giuliano	Republican	122,354	Nicholas Fernicola	Democrat	91,812
Gerado Del Tufo	Republican	119,956	John J. Giblin	Democrat	89,297
Alexander Matturri	Republican	119,152	Maclyn Goldman	Democrat	88,796
James Wallwork	Republican	118,834	David Mandelbaum	Democrat	85,131
Milton Waldor	Republican	117,280	Victor Addonizio	Democrat	83,587
David W. Dowd	Republican	115,568	Hutchins Inge	Democrat	83,543

==== 1970 Newark Mayoral Election ====
Candidate	Office	Votes	%
Kenneth A. Gibson	Chief Structural Engineer, City of Newark	37,666	43%
Hugh Joseph Addonizio	Two-term Mayor of Newark	17,925	20%
Anthony Imperiale	Newark City Councilman At-Large	13,904	16%
John Caufield	Newark Fire Director	11,752	13%
Alexander Matturri	Incumbent State Senator	4,752	5%
George C. Richardson	Former State Assemblyman	2,024	2%
Harry Wheeler	Community Leader	140	0%
