= David W. Dowd =

American baseball player and politician

Member of the New Jersey Senate from the 11th district
- In office January 9, 1968 – November 16, 1970
- Preceded by: Multi-member district
- Succeeded by: Charles DeMarco

Personal details
- Born: February 14, 1921 West Orange, New Jersey
- Died: October 20, 1988 (aged 67) Howell Township, New Jersey
- Spouse: Connie Sansone
- Children: 7
- Education: Villanova University; Rutgers University Law School

David William Dowd (February 7, 1921 – October 20, 1988) was an American Republican Party politician and minor league baseball player with the New York Yankees organization.

== Early life ==
Dowd was born in West Orange, New Jersey on February 7, 1921. He was the son of Thomas A. Dowd and Margaret J. Dowd. His father owned a real estate brokerage firm. Dowd attended Livingston High School, Villanova University and received his law degree from Rutgers University. He was married to Connie Sansone Dowd and had seven children.

== Baseball career ==
In 1942, Dowd signed a contract with the New York Yankees and was assigned to the Wellsville Yankees in the New York–Penn League. He played in 11 games, with a .182 batting average. His teammates included future Yankees Jerry Coleman and Charlie Silvera. Dowd's baseball career ended later that season when he joined the U.S. Army during World War II.

== Political career ==
Dowd first ran for office in his hometown of Livingston, New Jersey when he was elected to the Township Council in 1956. He was re-elected in 1960. Dowd served as Mayor of Livingston in 1958 and in 1963.

Dowd ran for the New Jersey State Senate in 1967. He won a hotly contested primary on a Reform Republican slate, finishing fourth in a field of thirteen candidates for six Senate seats elected at-large in Essex County. The General Election turned out to be a strong environment for Republicans; it was the mid-term election of Governor Richard J. Hughes's second term. Republicans won all six Senate seats, with Dowd running fifth. The four Democratic Senators elected in 1965 -- Nicholas Fernicola, John J. Giblin, Maclyn Goldman and Hutchins Inge—were all defeated.

On November 16, 1970, Dowd resigned from the Senate to become the General Counsel of the New Jersey Turnpike Authority. He held that post until 1974.

== Later life ==
Dowd practiced law in New Jersey and lived in Howell Township, New Jersey and in Florida. He died in 1988 at age 67.

== Election results ==
=== 1967 Republican State Senate Primary results ===
Winner	Votes	Loser	Votes
James Wallwork	21,156	Frederic Remington	19,087
Gerardo Del Tufo	19,889	Jack J. Soriano	18,668
Alexander Matturri	19,723	Irwin I. Kimmelman	18,525
David W. Dowd	19,324	Frank L. Bate	18,225
Michael Giuliano	19,245	J. Harry Smith	17,659
Milton Waldor	19,243	Thomas E. Boyle	35,517
		C. Marion Scipio	712

=== 1967 Essex County State Senator General Election results ===
Winner	Party	Votes	Loser	Party	Votes
Michael Giuliano	Republican	122,354	Nicholas Fernicola	Democrat	91,812
Gerado Del Tufo	Republican	119,956	John J. Giblin	Democrat	89,297
Alexander Matturri	Republican	119,152	Maclyn Goldman	Democrat	88,796
James Wallwork	Republican	118,834	David Mandelbaum	Democrat	85,131
Milton Waldor	Republican	117,280	Victor Addonizio	Democrat	83,587
David W. Dowd	Republican	115,568	Hutchins Inge	Democrat	83,543
