= Michael Giuliano =

American politician

Michael A. Giuliano

Member of the New Jersey Senate from the 11th District (at-large)
- In office January 9, 1968 – January 8, 1974
- Preceded by: Multi-member district
- Succeeded by: District abolished

Personal details
- Born: June 15, 1915 Newark, New Jersey
- Died: April 21, 1976 (aged 60)

Michael A. Giuliano (June 13, 1915 – April 21, 1976) was an American Republican Party politician who served two terms in the New Jersey Senate.

== Biography ==
Born in Newark, New Jersey, Giuliano graduated from Barringer High School and Rutgers University. He worked in the insurance business, and was the Superintendent of Weights and Measures for the City of Newark. He also worked as an Essex County Probation Officer and as the Deputy Clerk of the Newark Municipal Court. He served in the United States Army during World War II.

In 1965, Giuliano ran for the New Jersey General Assembly from Essex County, but was unsuccessful. He was the top Republican vote getter, finishing 10th in a field of 18 candidates for 9 seats. He received 116,345 votes—18,408 less than Democrat Walter Vohdin, who finished ninth among the Democratic winners.

Giuliano was elected to the New Jersey State Senate in 1967 in the 11th District. He won a close Republican primary, running at-Large for six Essex County Senate seats. The winners were former Assemblyman James Wallwork (21,156), former Assemblyman Geraldo Del Tufo (19,889), former Newark Judge Alexander Matturri (19,723), former Livingston Mayor David Dowd (19,245), and West Orange attorney Milton Waldor (19,243). The losing primary candidates were: Frederic Remington, Jr. (19,087), Jack J. Soriano (18,668), former Assemblyman (and future Attorney General) Irwin Kimmelman (18,525), former Assemblyman Frank Bate (18,225), J. Harry Smith (17,659), Thomas E. Boyle (16,708), and C. Marion Scipio (712). In the general election, Giuliano was the top vote getter for an Essex County Senate seat, with 122,354 votes. He was followed by Del Tufo (119,956), Matturri (119,152), Wallwork (117,834), Waldor (117,280) and Dowd (115,568). They defeated incumbent Democratic Sen. Nicholas Fernicola (91,812), incumbent Democratic Sen. John J. Giblin (89,297), incumbent Democratic Sen. Maclyn Goldman (88,796), Democratic Assemblyman David Mandelbaum (85,131), Democratic Assemblyman Victor Addonizio (83,587), and incumbent Democratic Sen. Hutchins Inge (83,543).

In 1971, Giuliano sought re-election to a second term in the State Senate. He easily won a contested Republican primary, outpolling Donald Blasi by 17,829 votes. In the general election, he was again the top vote getter countywide, with 92,166. He was followed by Democrat Ralph DeRose (91,380), Wallwork (88,632), Democratic Assemblyman Frank J. Dodd (86,041), and Democratic Freeholder Wynona Lipman (85,644), with two Republicans and three Democrats winning the five Essex County Senate seats. The losing candidates were: Waldor (84,736), Democrat Martin Greenberg (82,291), Republican Montclair Mayor Matthew G. Carter (77,418), Democrat Henry Smolen (76,190), Remington (73,663), and Giblin, running as an Independent (21,688).

Giuliano lost his bid for re-election to a third term in the Democratic landslide of 1973, losing to Democrat Carmen Orechio by 3,483 votes in the Democratic landslide of 1973, 29,878 (53%) to 26,395 (47%). He ran in the new 27th District following a redistricting.

In 1975, Giuliano made his last bid for public office, losing a race for Essex County Clerk to three term incumbent Nicholas V. Caputo.

A resident of Bloomfield, he died on April 21, 1976.
