= David Mandelbaum (politician) =

American politician (born 1935)

- Born: December 13, 1935 (age 90); Newark, New Jersey
- Education: B.A. Princeton University; J.D. Harvard University Law School
- Occupations: Politician; Real estate developer
- Known for: Minority-owner of the Minnesota Vikings
- Spouse: Karen Krupnick
- Children: 4
- Parent(s): Philip Mandelbaum; Ella Baum Mandelbaum

David Mandelbaum (born December 13, 1935) is an American Democratic Party politician, minority-owner of the Minnesota Vikings of the National Football League (NFL), and real estate developer.

== Early life ==
Mandelbaum was born to a Jewish family on December 13, 1935, in Newark, New Jersey, the son of Philip Mandelbaum (June 22, 1908 – June 30, 2004) and Ella Baum Mandelbaum (1911–1999). He grew up in Maplewood, New Jersey. He is a graduate of Princeton University and Harvard University Law School. He is a partner at the law firm of Mandelbaum & Mandelbaum.

== New Jersey State Assemblyman ==
He was elected to the New Jersey General Assembly in 1961, at the age of 25. He finished fourth in a field of 28 candidates for nine Essex County At-Large Assembly seats. He received 140,037 votes, more than 12,000 votes ahead of incumbent Republican Assemblyman Philip Lindeman. He was narrowly re-elected in 1963, finishing 1,065 votes ahead of another Democratic Assemblyman, John J. Miller, Jr. He was re-elected by more than 24,000 votes in 1965.

== Campaign for State Senator ==
Mandelbaum ran for the New Jersey State Senate in 1967. The General Election turned out to be a strong environment for Republicans; it was the mid-term election of Governor Richard J. Hughes's second term. Republicans won all six Essex County Senate seats, with Matturri running third. Mandelbaum finished tenth in the election. The four Democratic Senators elected in 1965—Nicholas Fernicola, John J. Giblin, Maclyn Goldman and Hutchins Inge—were all defeated.

=== 1967 Essex County State Senator General Election results ===
Winner	Party	Votes	Loser	Party	Votes
Michael Giuliano	Republican	122,354	Nicholas Fernicola	Democrat	91,812
Gerado Del Tufo	Republican	119,956	John J. Giblin	Democrat	89,297
Alexander Matturri	Republican	119,152	Maclyn Goldman	Democrat	88,796
James Wallwork	Republican	118,834	David Mandelbaum	Democrat	85,131
Milton Waldor	Republican	117,280	Victor Addonizio	Democrat	83,587
David W. Dowd	Republican	115,568	Hutchins Inge	Democrat	83,543

== Business activities ==
In 1968, Mandelbaum contributed $250,000 towards the formation of Interstate Properties, a real estate development firm, with Steven Roth and Russell Wight. The firm later took control of the Vornado fan company (previously acquired by the Two Guys department store chain) and turned it into the Vornado Realty Trust. Mandelbaum has been a trustee of the trust since 1979, and a Director of Alexander's, Inc. since 1995.

In 2005, Mandelbaum and five other partners, in a group led by Zygi Wilf, purchased the Minnesota Vikings of the National Football League from Red McCombs for a reported US$600 million. Forbes estimates the 2014 value of the franchise at US$1.007 billion, or 21st of the 32 NFL teams.

Mandelbaum and his family were named 384th on the Forbes 400 list in 2005, with an estimated net worth of $900 million.

== Family ==
Mandelbaum married Karen Krupnick in a Jewish ceremony in 1964.
