= David Mandelbaum =

David Mandelbaum may refer to:

- David G. Mandelbaum (1911–1987), American anthropologist
- David Mandelbaum (politician) (born 1935), American politician, and minority-owner of the Minnesota Vikings NFL team
