= David Dowd =

David Dowd may refer to:

- David Dudley Dowd Jr. (1929–2016), United States judge in Ohio
- David W. Dowd (1921–1975), American politician and minor league baseball player
