= John Renna =

American Republican Party politician

John Pasquale Renna Jr.

Commissioner of the New Jersey Department of Community Affairs
- In office February 10, 1982 – November 29, 1985
- Governor: Thomas Kean
- Preceded by: Joseph A. LeFante
- Succeeded by: Leonard S. Coleman Jr.

Personal details
- Born: May 19, 1920 West Orange, New Jersey, U.S.
- Died: August 21, 1998 (aged 78) West Orange, New Jersey, U.S.
- Party: Republican

John Pasquale Renna Jr. (May 19, 1920 – August 21, 1998) was a builder and Republican Party politician who served two separate tenures as the Essex County, New Jersey Republican Chairman, and as the Commissioner of the New Jersey Department of Community Affairs.

== Biography ==
He was born on May 19, 1920, in West Orange, New Jersey, as one of eight children of John Pasquale Renna Sr., a baker. He worked full-time as a bookkeeper and attended Rutgers University at night, earning a degree in accounting.

In 1962, Renna sought a seat on the West Orange, New Jersey Township Council, but was unsuccessful.

From 1970 to 1974, during the administration of Governor William Cahill, Renna served as Executive Director of the New Jersey Housing Finance Agency (HFA). The agency was accused of corruption during the period Renna was at its head, but Renna was never subpoenaed and maintained his innocence of any impropriety. He also served as Essex County Purchasing Agent and was the longtime West Orange Republican Chairman.

In 1977, Renna backed Raymond Bateman, a State Senator from Somerset County, for the Republican nomination for Governor. In that race, there were two Essex County candidates: former Assembly Speaker Thomas Kean and former State Senator C. Robert Sarcone. Although Kean carried Essex County, Bateman won the nomination. Renna immediately became a candidate for Essex County Republican Chairman (the incumbent, Frederic Remington, had won a GOP primary for Kean's State Assembly seat ). With the support of Bateman, who was leading in the polls, Renna defeated Assemblyman Carl Orechio of Nutley.

Renna endorsed Kean for the gubernatorial nomination in 1981. Kean was one of five Essex County candidates seeking the GOP nomination, along with State Senator James Wallwork, Assemblyman Anthony Imperiale, former Superior Court Judge Richard McGlynn, and millionaire businessman Bo Sullivan. Kean won the nomination and the general election, and named Renna to his cabinet as Commissioner of Community Affairs. In that role, he also sat on the Hackensack Meadowlands Development Commission, which controlled development in a large area in the state. Renna considered his greatest achievements in that role the enforcement of the boarding home regulations and a new fire safety code.

In 1985, Renna left the cabinet, and he became president of Great American Recreation, Inc. which operated the Vernon Valley-Great Gorge ski resort and the Action Park amusement park in Sussex County. In 1986, he was again elected Essex County Republican Chairman. Renna had a few wins by watching the Democratic primary from the sidelines and then figuring out his ticket over the summer. That's what happened in 1986, when Essex County Executive Peter Shapiro's popularity plummeted—especially among Democrats. Sensing an opportunity, Renna pulled his candidate, Carl Orechio, off the ticket and replaced him with Nicholas Amato, who had won three terms as Essex County Surrogate as a Democrat before Shapiro dumped him from the party line a few months earlier. For Surrogate, Renna ran another party switcher: Earl Harris, the Newark City Council President. The result was a GOP landslide.

In 1988 he convinced Joe Louis Clark, the principal of Eastside High School in Paterson, New Jersey, and the subject of a semi-biographical film, Lean on Me, to run for Essex County Freeholder as a Republican. In a heavily Democratic district based in East Orange, Clark lost to LeRoy Jones.

In 1994, Renna helped another Republican, James Treffinger, win election as Essex County Executive. But after Trefinger took office, he feuded with Renna and in 1996 engineered a coup to oust him.

Renna died on August 21, 1998, four months after his wife, Grace Baldanza Renna.

== John P. Renna Jr. House ==
The John P. Renna House, or John P. Renna Jr. House, Section 8 low-income senior-citizen housing in West Orange, is named for him. Construction began in 1972.
