= Leonard S. Coleman Jr. =

Commissioner of the New Jersey Department of Community Affairs
- In office February 18, 1986 – July 6, 1988
- Governor: Thomas Kean
- Preceded by: John Renna
- Succeeded by: Anthony M. Villane

Commissioner of the New Jersey Department of Energy
- In office February 10, 1982 – February 18, 1986
- Governor: Thomas Kean
- Preceded by: Charles A. Richman (acting)
- Succeeded by: Charles A. Richman (acting)

Personal details
- Born: February 17, 1949 (age 77) Newark, New Jersey, U.S.

Leonard S. Coleman Jr. (born February 17, 1949) is an American politician and executive who served as the last president of the National League. He held the office from 1994 until 1999 when it was eliminated by Major League Baseball. He is currently on the Board of Directors of H. J. Heinz Company, the Omnicom Group, Cendant Corporation, Aramark, Churchill Downs and Electronic Arts. He received a Master of Education from the Harvard Graduate School of Education and a Master of Public Administration from the John F. Kennedy School of Government at Harvard University.

== Early life and education ==
Born in Newark, New Jersey on February 17, 1949, Coleman was raised in Montclair, New Jersey and attended Montclair High School, where he played baseball and football, earning a selection as a New Jersey All-American halfback during his senior year. He played both sports at Princeton University and became the first black athlete to score a touchdown for the Princeton Tigers football team but joined two other black players in filing charges that the university had discriminated against them in their opportunities to fairly participate on the football team based on their race, leading to the dismissal of all three players from the team.

Coleman graduated from Princeton University in 1971 with a degree in history, then attended Harvard University, where he earned both a master's degree in public administration (MPA) and a master's degree in education and social policy.

== Career ==
A resident of Atlantic Highlands, New Jersey, Coleman served as commissioner of the New Jersey Department of Community Affairs until July 15, 1988, when he left office to enter private industry and was succeeded by Anthony M. Villane. He had also served as commissioner of the New Jersey Department of Energy, and he was chairman of the Hackensack Meadowlands Development Commission and the New Jersey Housing and Mortgage Finance Agency.

While serving as president of the National League, Coleman operated Reviving Baseball in Inner Cities, forging a working alliance with the Boys and Girls Clubs of America to help grow the RBI program. He also served as chairman of the board of directors of the Jackie Robinson Foundation for 18 years.

Preceded by Bill White	National League President; 1994–1999	Succeeded by office abolished
