= Andrew C. Axtell =

American politician (1911-1994)

- Born: December 11, 1911
- Died: March 10, 1994 (aged 82)
- Occupation: Politician

Andrew C. Axtell (December 11, 1911 – March 10, 1994) was an American Republican Party politician from New Jersey.

== Biography ==
He served as Mayor of Livingston, New Jersey, in the 1950s. When Robert W. Kean of Livingston stepped down as Essex County Republican Chairman in 1962, he supported Axtell to succeed him. In a close race, Axtell defeated former U.S. Attorney William F. Tompkins, 438 to 416. He ran on a ticket with Kean's Vice Chairwoman, Ruth Stevenson. Axtell served as County Chairman until replaced by George M. Wallhauser, Jr. As County Chairman, Axtell supported the nomination of William L. Stubbs as the first major party African American candidate for the U.S. House of Representatives from New Jersey.

Governor William Cahill appointed Axtell to serve as a Commissioner of the Port Authority of New York and New Jersey in 1972. During the 1973 campaign, Democratic gubernatorial candidate Brendan Byrne criticized Axtell for pushing to increase PATH fares. In 1977, he became involved in a scandal when an audit by the New York State Comptroller Arthur Levitt found that the Port Authority spent over $100,000 on foreign trips for Commissioners and agency executives, including Axtell and his wife, Ruth C. Axtell (1909-2009). The audit revealed that the officials flew first class to Europe, Asia and Africa on trips organized by World Trade Center executive Guy F. Tozzoli. When his six-year term expired, Byrne declined to reappoint Axtell as a Commissioner.

Born in Australia and raised in Ohio, Axtell was the President of the Essex Welding Equipment Company. He married Ruth Cunningham in 1937.
