= William F. Tompkins (New Jersey politician) =

American politician (1913–1989)

Member of the New Jersey General Assembly
- In office November 1950 – March 1953
- Preceded by: Percy A. Miller Jr.
- Succeeded by: Reinhardt V. Metzger

United States Attorney for the District of New Jersey
- In office March 1953 – July 1954
- Appointed by: Dwight D. Eisenhower
- Preceded by: Grover C. Richman Jr.
- Succeeded by: Raymond Del Tufo Jr.

Assistant U.S. Attorney General
- In office 1954–1958

Personal details
- Born: William Finley Tompkins; February 26, 1913 Newark, New Jersey, U.S.
- Died: July 6, 1989 (aged 76) Bermuda
- Party: Republican
- Spouse: Jane Bryant Tompkins

William Finley Tompkins (February 26, 1913 – July 6, 1989) was an American Republican Party politician who served as the U.S. Attorney from New Jersey and as a member of the New Jersey General Assembly.

== Early life ==
Tompkins was born in Newark, New Jersey, on February 26, 1913, the son of William Brydon Tompkins (1866–1918) and Elizabeth Lillian Finley (1883–1967). His family emigrated to the United States from England in the 1600s. He was a graduate of Wesleyan University and Rutgers University Law School. He served as a United States Army Lieutenant during World War II and he later prosecuted war crimes charges in Singapore. He was a partner at the Newark law firm of Lum, Fairlie & Foster.

== New Jersey State Assemblyman ==
In 1950, Tompkins was elected the New Jersey State Assembly, winning a special election to fill the unexpired term of Assemblyman Percy A. Miller Jr., who had been appointed New Jersey Commissioner of Labor by Governor Alfred Driscoll. Tompkins defeated Democrat John J. Egan 125,276 to 120,238, with 4,224 votes going to Progressive Party candidate William Johnston. He was re-elected to a second term in 1951 representing Essex County.

== Eisenhower administration ==
President Dwight Eisenhower nominated Tompkins to serve as the United States Attorney for the District of New Jersey in 1953, succeeding Grover C. Richman Jr.

He resigned in 1954 when Eisenhower appointed him to serve as Assistant U.S. Attorney General, in charge of the Internal Security Division, established to counter subversive activities. He successfully prosecuted Soviet spy master Rudolf Ivanovich Abel. With a reputation as a racket-buster, Tompkins won a denaturalization order and indictment against mobster Albert Anastasia, who was found guilty and jailed on federal income tax evasion charges. Tompkins supervised the conviction of over 100 Communist Party leaders for illegal and subversive activities. He served in the Eisenhower Administration until 1958.

== Later political career ==
Bernard M. Shanley, a New Jerseyan who served as an Eisenhower's Deputy White House Chief of Staff, touted Tompkins as a potential Republican candidate for Governor of New Jersey against Robert B. Meyner in 1957. Tompkins did not become a candidate, and remained in Washington until 1958.

The 1958 race for an open United States Senate seat in New Jersey created a long-term problem for Tompkins' political future. He supported Shanley, who left the White House staff to become a candidate, against ten-term U.S. Rep. Robert W. Kean, who was from Tompkins' home county, Essex. Kean beat Shanley in the Republican primary, but lost the General Election. After leaving Congress, Kean was elected Essex County Republican Chairman.

In the 1961 Republican gubernatorial primary, Kean backed Walter H. Jones, a State Senator from New Jersey, while Tompkins supported Eisenhower's U.S. Secretary of Labor, James P. Mitchell. After Mitchell won the primary, Tompkins ran against Kean for Essex GOP Chairman, but lost 409 to 268. Kean stepped down as County Chairman in 1962 and endorsed former Livingston Mayor Andrew C. Axtell as his successor. Tompkins ran again, but Axtell beat him 438 to 416.

In 1965, the U.S. Supreme Court, in Reynolds v. Sims (more commonly known as One Man, One Vote), required redistricting by state legislatures for congressional districts to keep represented populations equal, as well as requiring both houses of state legislatures to have districts drawn that contained roughly equal populations, and to perform redistricting when needed. Because of its population, Essex County went from one Senate seat to four seats.

Tompkins became a candidate for State Senator, but with popular Democratic Governor Richard J. Hughes running for re-election, 1965 turned out to be a Democratic landslide year and Tompkins lost the General Election. He ran more than 23,000 votes behind Democrat Hutchins F. Inge, who became the first African American to win a seat in the New Jersey State Senate.

In 1967, Tompkins' sister, Vivian Tompkins Lange, ran against Robert Kean's son, Thomas Kean, in the Republican State Assembly primary, but was defeated.

=== 1965 Essex County state senator general election results ===
| Winner | Party | Votes | Loser | Party | Votes |
|---|---|---|---|---|---|
| Nicholas Fernicola | Democrat | 145,589 | C. Robert Sarcone | Republican | 128,815 |
| Maclyn Goldman | Democrat | 143,794 | Irwin Kimmelman | Republican | 116,205 |
| John J. Giblin | Democrat | 143,040 | James E. Churchman Jr. | Republican | 112,995 |
| Hutchins F. Inge | Democrat | 135,959 | William F. Tompkins | Republican | 112,128 |
| | | | George C. Richardson | Independent | 10,409 |
| | | | Kendrick O. Stephenson | Independent | 5,970 |
| | | | David Blumgart | Independent | 5,305 |
| | | | Frederick Waring | Independent | 44,76 |

== Later years ==
He was a partner at a major New Jersey law firm, Tompkins, McGuire & Wachenfeld. In 1989, he died of a heart attack while vacationing in Bermuda. He was 76.
