= Lewis J. Paper =

Lewis J. Paper (born October 13, 1946) is an American Democratic Party politician, attorney, and author.

== Biography ==
He was born in Newark, New Jersey, the son of Dorothy and Sidney Paper. He is a 1968 graduate of the University of Michigan at Ann Arbor, with high distinction and honors in political science. He graduated from Harvard Law School in 1971, and as part of a fellowship with the Institute of Public Interest Representation, received his Master of Law from Georgetown Law School in 1972.

In 1967, he was a White House intern in the administration of President Lyndon B. Johnson.

From 1972 to 1973, he worked for the Washington, D.C.–based Citizens Communication Center, a public interest law firm specializing in broadcasting. He was the Legislative Counsel to U.S. senator Gaylord Nelson, Democrat of Wisconsin, from 1973 to 1975.

After returning to New Jersey in 1975, he was an associate at the Newark law firm of Lowenstein Sandler.

In 1977, Paper became the Democratic nominee for New Jersey State Senator in the 25th district, which included parts of Essex, Morris and Passaic counties. His opponent was three-term Republican James Wallwork. Paper was defeated by more 12,421 votes—35,517 to 23,096–61%-39%. This was Paper's first and only bid for public office.

After his loss in the state Senate race, Paper moved back to Washington to take a post in the Carter administration. He was the assistant general counsel for agenda review and policy for the Federal Communications Commission from 1978 to 1981. He left after Carter lost his re-election bid.

Paper was a partner at four Washington law firms: Grove and Engelberg from 1981 to 1986, Keck, Mahin and Cate, from 1986 until the firm's collapse in 1997, Dickstein Shapiro from 1997 to 2012, and Pillsbury Winthrop Shaw Pittman since 2012.

He is the author of six books: The Promise and the Performance: The Leadership of John F. Kennedy(1975), Brandeis: An Intimate Biography of One of America's Truly Great Supreme Court Justices (1983), Empire: William S Paley and the Making of CBS (1987), Deadly Risks (2008), Perfect: Don Larsen's Miraculous World Series Game and the Men Who Made It Happen (2009), and In the Cauldron: Terror, Tension, and the American Ambassador's Struggle to Avoid Pearl Harbor.
