= John J. Giblin =

American politician and labor leader

Member of the New Jersey Senate from the 11th District (at-large)
- In office January 11, 1966 – January 9, 1968
- Preceded by: C. Robert Sarcone
- Succeeded by: Multi-member district

Essex County Board of Chosen Freeholders
- In office January 1955 – December 1957

Personal details
- Born: February 14, 1909 Tibohine, Frenchpark, County Roscommon Ireland
- Died: December 20, 1975 (aged 66) Glen Ridge, New Jersey
- Spouse: Teresa E. Moran
- Children: Thomas P. Giblin, Vincent Giblin, John J. Giblin, Jr., Eileen Giblin Coyne, Mary C. Giblin (1954–2012)

John J. Giblin (February 14, 1909 – December 20, 1975) was an American Democratic Party politician and labor leader.

== Early life ==
Giblin was born in Ireland on February 14, 1909, and came to the United States at age 19. He worked in the power plant at the Newark offices of the Prudential Insurance Company from 1929 until 1942, when he became the Supervisor of Heating and Repairs for the Newark Public Schools.

In 1942, Giblin became a member of the International Union of Operating Engineers Local 68. He was elected Business Manager and President of the union in 1948 and held that post until his death. He had also served as Chairman of the Board of Trustees of the International Union of Operating Engineers in Washington, D.C.

== Political career ==
In May 1953, Giblin was elected to the Newark Charter Study Commission, which recommended a change to the mayor-council form of government.

In November 1954, he was elected to the Essex County Board of Chosen Freeholders. He served as a New Jersey State Senator in 1966 and 1967.

The U.S. Supreme Court decision in Reynolds v. Sims (more commonly known as One Man, One Vote), required redistricting by state legislatures for congressional districts to keep represented populations equal, as well as requiring both houses of state legislatures to have districts drawn that contained roughly equal populations, and to perform redistricting when needed. Because of its population, Essex County gained three Senate seats.

In 1965, he was elected New Jersey State Senator. He was defeated for re-election in 1967. Giblin and his three running mates defeated four Republicans, including the incumbent, Senate Minority Leader C. Robert Sarcone.

New Jersey held a constitutional convention in 1966 to address reapportionment issues created by the One Man, One Vote decision. Following redistricting, Essex County gained two more seats, for a total of six. In 1967, Giblin and his Democratic running mates were defeated by a slate of Republican Senate candidates.

Giblin again sought election to the State Senate in 1971, running on an independent ticket. He finished 11th for five seats, finishing more than 50,000 votes behind the low-votegetting candidate.

He also served as Clerk to the Essex County Jury Commission, and a member of The New Jersey State Board of Mediation.

== Personal ==
Giblin and his wife, the former Teresa Moran, had five children, including Thomas P. Giblin, a longtime New Jersey Assemblyman and former New Jersey Democratic State Chairman, and Vincent Giblin, the President of the international Union of Operating Engineers. A resident of West Orange, Giblin died at Mountainside Hospital in Glen Ridge, New Jersey.

== Election results ==
=== 1965 Essex County State Senator General Election ===
Winner	Party	Votes	Loser	Party	Votes
Nicholas Fernicola	Democrat	145,589	C. Robert Sarcone	Republican	128,815
Maclyn Goldman	Democrat	143,794	Irwin I. Kimmelman	Republican	116,205
John J. Giblin	Democrat	143,040	James E. Churchman, Jr.	Republican	112,995
Hutchins F. Inge	Democrat	135,959	William F. Tompkins	Republican	112,128
			George C. Richardson	Independent	10,409
			Kendrick O. Stephenson	Independent	5,970
			David Blumgart	Independent	5,305
			Frederick Waring	Independent	44,76

=== 1967 Essex County State Senator General Election ===
Winner	Party	Votes	Loser	Party	Votes
Michael Giuliano	Republican	122,354	Nicholas Fernicola	Democrat	91,812
Gerado Del Tufo	Republican	119,956	John J. Giblin	Democrat	89,297
Alexander Matturri	Republican	119,152	Maclyn Goldman	Democrat	88,796
James Wallwork	Republican	118,834	David Mandelbaum	Democrat	85,131
Milton Waldor	Republican	117,280	Victor Addonizio	Democrat	83,587
David W. Dowd	Republican	115,568	Hutchins Inge	Democrat	83,543

=== 1971 Essex County State Senator General Election ===
Winner	Party	Votes	Loser	Party	Votes
Michael Giuliano	Republican	92,166	Milton Waldor	Republican	84,736
Ralph DeRose	Democrat	91,380	Martin L. Greenberg	Democrat	82,291
James Wallwork	Republican	88,632	Matthew G. Carter	Republican	77,418
Frank J. Dodd	Democrat	86,041	Henry Smolen	Democrat	76,190
Wynona Lipman	Democrat	85,644	Frederic Remington	Republican	73,663
			John J. Giblin	Essex Bi-Partisan	21,688
			John F. Monica	Essex Bi-Partisan	21,072
			Sylvester L. Casta	Essex Bi-Partisan	19,015
			Joseph J. Bradley	Essex Bi-Partisan	16,348
			Richard P. Weitzman	Essex Bi-Partisan	15,733
			Joseph A. Santiago	Unity-Victory-Progress	5,483
