= Percy A. Miller Jr. =

American politician (1899–1984)

Percy A. Miller Jr. (June 7, 1899 – November 23, 1984) was an American Republican Party politician who served as Speaker of the New Jersey General Assembly and as the New Jersey Commissioner of Labor.

Born in Carlisle, Pennsylvania, Miller served in the U.S. Army during World War I. He served as Mayor of Irvington, New Jersey from 1934 to 1938, and as an Irvington Town Commissioner from 1938 to 1950. He was elected to the New Jersey State Assembly in 1947, and served as Assembly Majority Leader in 1949 and as Assembly Speaker in 1950. He resigned his Assembly seat in 1950 when Governor Alfred Driscoll appointed him to serve in his cabinet as Commissioner of Labor. He held that post for four years. He served as Director of Employment Information and Licensing for the Waterfront Commission of New York Harbor before retiring in 1961. Later, Miller was the Chairman of the State Police and Firemen's Pension Fund Commission and of the State Vocational Rehabilitation Commission.

A longtime resident of Stuart, Florida, he died at a hospital there at the age of 85.

Preceded by Hugh L. Mehorter	Speaker of the New Jersey General Assembly; 1950– 1950	Succeeded by James E. Fraser
