= Hugh A. Kelly Jr. =

New Jersey State Senator (1923/24-1999)

Member of the New Jersey Senate from the 3B district
- In office January 9, 1968 – January 11, 1972
- Preceded by: District created
- Succeeded by: Joseph A. Maressa

Personal details
- Born: September 5, 1923
- Died: April 15, 1999 (aged 75) Gloucester Township, New Jersey
- Party: Republican
- Spouse: Irene nee Dobies
- Children: Jean K. Townsend, Patricia K. Gerle, Thomas P. Kelly, Timothy L. Kelly, Michele Stark, Daniel Kelly, Colleen Miller
- Occupation: Police officer, Private detective
- Committees: Law and Public Safety

Hugh A. Kelly Jr. (September 5, 1923 – April 15, 1999), was an American politician who served in the New Jersey Senate for a single term representing District 3B as a Republican.

== Biography ==
Born September 5, 1923, and raised in Rutherford, New Jersey, Kelly played prep football at St. Mary High School; after moving with his family to Somerdale in South Jersey, his son boarded with a relative in order to attend and play football at his father's alma mater.

Kelly started his career as a police officer in Rutherford in 1951 rising to the rank of Lieutenant before becoming a US Marshall in 1958 eventually becoming the deputy in charge of South Jersey. In 1961, he was named as an undersheriff for Camden County and served as the director of the Camden County Sheriff's Department in the mid-1970s.

Elected to the State Senate for a single term as a Republican, Kelly served as vice chairman of the Law and Public Safety Committee and played a role in the adoption of wiretapping laws.

After leaving office he founded a private detective agency in Somerdale. He worked as director of public safety in Gloucester Township from 1976 to 1978, and as director of security for the Camden County Health Complex in Lakeland beginning in 1979. He also served as director of security and safety for Camden County from 1980 to 1987.

Starting in 1968 Kelly served on the board of the Kennedy Health Systems and served as chairman of the Atlantic City Expressway Commission. In 1996 he was appointed to the South Jersey Port Corporation's board, serving on it until his death. In this capacity he advocated for further merger between South Jersey and Philadelphia's ports.

Kelly died at his home in Gloucester Township, New Jersey, on April 15, 1999, at the age of 75 due to prostate cancer.

== Personal life ==
Kelly was married to Irene née Dobies, the couple had 7 children: Jean K. Townsend, Patricia K. Gerle, Thomas P. Kelly, Timothy L. Kelly, Michele Stark, Daniel Kelly, and Colleen Miller. Kelly also had a brother, John. Kelly was Catholic.
