= Donal C. Fox =

American politician

Member of the New Jersey Senate from Essex County
- In office 1956–1964
- Preceded by: Mark Anton
- Succeeded by: C. Robert Sarcone

Personal details
- Born: Donal C. Fox; December 16, 1903 Amesbury, Massachusetts
- Died: August 15, 1987 (aged 83)
- Party: Democratic
- Education: University of Pennsylvania

Donal C. Fox (December 16, 1903 – August 15, 1987) was an American Democratic Party official who represented Essex County, New Jersey in the New Jersey State Senate from 1956 to 1964. Born in Amesbury, Massachusetts, he graduated from the University of Pennsylvania and Fordham Law School and practiced law in Newark, New Jersey. He served as the Deputy Attorney General of New Jersey, the First Assistant Essex County Prosecutor, the Chairman of the South Orange Planning Board and as President of the Essex County Bar Association.

In 1955, Fox became the Democratic nominee for State Senator, challenging freshman Republican incumbent Mark Anton. Anton faced a split among Essex Republican factions after just narrowly defeating Assembly Majority Leader William O. Barnes in the GOP Primary. Fox beat Anton by 7,809 votes out of more than 230,000 cast, a 51%-48% win.

Fox won re-election to a second term in 1959, defeating Republican Alfred Clapp, who served in the State Senate from 1948 to 1953, when he resigned to become a Superior Court Judge. Clapp left the bench to help the GOP regain the Senate seat, but Fox won by 14,582 votes, a 51%-45% win.

He did not seek re-election to a third term in 1963 after losing the support of the Essex County Democratic organization, but instead accepted an appointment by Governor Richard J. Hughes as a Commissioner of the Waterfront Commission of New York Harbor.
