= Frederic Remington (politician) =

American politician

Frederic Remington Jr.

Member of the New Jersey General Assembly from the 25th district
- In office January 10, 1978 – January 12, 1982
- Preceded by: Thomas Kean
- Succeeded by: Arthur R. Albohn; James J. Barry Jr.

Chairman of the Essex County Republican Party
- In office June 1973 – June 1977
- Preceded by: George M. Wallhauser, Jr.
- Succeeded by: John Renna

Personal details
- Born: November 14, 1929 Elizabeth, New Jersey
- Died: January 2, 2016 (aged 86)
- Spouse: Jeanette Remington

Frederic Remington Jr. (November 14, 1929 – January 2, 2016) was an American Republican Party politician who served in the New Jersey General Assembly from 1978 to 1982.

== Early life and business career ==
Remington graduated from Thomas Jefferson High School in Elizabeth, New Jersey and attended Temple University and Newark College of Engineering. He served in the U.S. Coast Guard for two years. He was the Vice President and Director of the Peerless Tube Company. Peerless Tube, a family business, was among the first companies to incorporate plastic caps and necks in its squeezable metal tubes designed for toothpaste, paints and medicines.

== Political career ==
In 1967, Remington became a candidate for the New Jersey State Senate, but lost the Republican Primary by just 156 votes, 19,243 to 19,087, to Milton Waldor, who went on to win the General Election. He ran again for State Senator in 1971, winning the GOP primary but losing the General Election by nearly 12,000 votes.

Remington was elected to serve as the Republican State Committeeman from Essex County in 1969, and was re-elected in 1973. He was elected Essex County Republican Chairman in 1973, and was re-elected in 1975 against a strong challenge from former State Senator C. Robert Sarcone.

When Thomas Kean gave up his State Assembly seat in 1977 to run for Governor of New Jersey, Remington became a candidate for the New Jersey General Assembly. He won the Republican Primary, finishing second in a field of seven candidates; he defeated Wayne Mayor Newton Edward Miller by 1,237 votes, 7,685 to 6,448. In the General Election Coburn lost by 7,330 votes; Remington defeated Livingston Mayor Donald S. Coburn by 7,330 votes; incumbent Jane Burgio was the top vote getter with 34,859, followed by Remington (30,754), Coburn (23,434) and Bernard Reiner, a History Professor at Fairleigh Dickinson University (21,553). He was re-elected in 1979, defeating a well-financed campaign from Democrat Jim Bildner, the heir to the Kings Supermarket fortune. Remington won by 1,964 votes, 20,258 to 18,294.

In 1981, James Wallwork gave up his New Jersey Senate seat to become a Republican gubernatorial candidate. Burgio and Remington both wanted to run for the Senate, but when their shared hometown of North Caldwell, New Jersey was moved into a different district, neither of them ran for anything.

Remington died on January 2, 2016.
