= Joseph M. Keegan =

American politician

Joseph M. Keegan (February 27, 1922 – October 21, 2007) was an American Democratic Party politician from Passaic, who served four terms in the New Jersey General Assembly and a single term in the New Jersey Senate.

After losing in his first bid for office, he won a seat in the Assembly in the 1957 elections. Keegan lost his Senate reelection bid in 1967 after supporting an unpopular bill to provide unemployment benefits for certain striking workers, at the behest of then-Governor Richard J. Hughes. Shortly thereafter, Hughes appointed Keegan to serve on the New Jersey Alcoholic Beverage Control Commission.

He was a delegate to the 1964 Democratic National Convention, in Atlantic City, New Jersey.

Keegan received a bachelor's degree from the College of the Holy Cross and a law degree from John Marshall Law School in Jersey City, New Jersey.
