= C. Robert Sarcone =

American politician (1925–2020)

Member of the New Jersey Senate from Essex County
- In office January 14, 1964 – January 11, 1966
- Preceded by: Donal C. Fox
- Succeeded by: Nicholas Fernicola; Maclyn Goldman; John J. Giblin; Hutchins Inge

Member of the New Jersey General Assembly from Essex County
- In office January 12, 1960 – January 14, 1964

New Jersey Assembly Minority Leader
- In office January 1962 – January 1963
- Preceded by: Carmine Savino
- Succeeded by: Alfred Beadleston

Personal details
- Born: Carmine Robert Sarcone; August 3, 1925 Newark, New Jersey
- Died: January 12, 2020 (aged 94)
- Party: Republican
- Spouse: Jeanette Torsiello
- Education: Columbia University; Rutgers University Law School

Carmine Robert Sarcone (August 3, 1925 – January 12, 2020) was an American Republican Party politician. He served in both houses of the New Jersey State Legislature, and sought the Republican nomination for Governor of New Jersey in 1977.

== Early life ==
He was born August 3, 1925, in Newark, New Jersey, the son of Fioravante Sarcone, an electrician and immigrant from Italy, and Rosse Sarcone, who was born in New Jersey to Italian immigrants. He was a 1943 graduate of Barringer High School, attended Muhlenberg College and Columbia University, and received his law degree from Rutgers University Law School in 1949. He served in the U.S. Navy during World War II from February 1943 to August 1946. He was stationed in the Pacific Theater and served in Iwo Jima and Okinawa; he was present at Bikini Atoll for the testing of the Atomic Bomb.

== Early career ==
Sarcone was appointed Special Legal Assistant to the Essex County Prosecutor in 1956, and became an Assistant Essex County Prosecutor in 1957. He was appointed Deputy Attorney General of New Jersey in 1959.

== New Jersey State Assemblyman ==
He was elected to the New Jersey General Assembly in 1959, running at-large for one of 12 Essex County seats in the legislature. He finished second out of 24 candidates with seven Republicans and five Democrats winning the election.

He was narrowly re-elected to a second term in 1961. Democrats won eight of nine Essex Assembly seats that year; Sarcone finished ninth, defeating Albert Poll, a former Essex County Counsel and Assistant Essex County Prosecutor, by just 188 votes, 127,539 to 127,351.

He was the Assembly Minority Leader in 1962.

== New Jersey State Senator ==
The retirement of two term Democratic Senator Donal C. Fox in 1963 set up an epic battle for the Essex County Senate seat between Sarcone, Assembly Speaker Elmer Matthews, and George C. Richardson, a Black Democratic Assemblyman who was running as an Independent. "He was a dynamic campaigner, very articulate and very well respected and loved in the community," said Assemblyman Ralph R. Caputo said in a 2010 interview about Sarcone. “He was the prototype for that political era where people actually campaigned, when there was no computerized mailing. It was a physical thing. You had to be very close to the communities you served, and very organized. Society was different. There were half a million people in the City of Newark and it was a boiling point of politics. I tried to model myself on Sarcone. I loved him."

Sarcone defeated Matthews by 15,902 votes, 125,836 (50.72%) to 109,934 (44.31%), with Richardson receiving 10,164 votes (4.10%).

In 1965, after the U.S. Supreme Court, in Reynolds v. Sims (more commonly known as one man, one vote) required redistricting by state legislatures for districts to keep represented populations equal, as well as requiring both houses of state legislatures to have districts drawn that contained roughly equal populations, and to perform redistricting when needed, the number of senate seats up for election that year from Essex County increased to four. Sarcone ran for re-election on a ticket with former U.S. Attorney William F. Tompkins, Assemblyman (and future New Jersey Attorney General) Irwin I. Kimmelman, and James E. Churchman, Jr., a funeral director and the first black Republican to win a major party nomination for State Senator. The four easily defeated John B. Garcia in the Republican primary. The Democrats nominated Essex County Freeholder John J. Giblin, former Newark Municipal Court Judge Nicholas Fernicola, West Orange Democratic leader Maclyn Goldman, and Hutchins F. Inge, a Black physician from Newark.

Sarcone and his other Republican running mates lost in 1965, the victim of a landslide re-election victory by Governor Richard J. Hughes that had clear coattails in legislative races. Sarcone was the top vote getter among the Republicans (he finished more than 12,000 votes ahead of Kimmelman), but lost to Inge by 7,144 votes, 135,959 votes; Sarcone received 128,815. Inge made history as the first black person to serve in the New Jersey Senate.

=== 1965 Essex County State Senator General Election Results ===
Winner	Party	Votes	Loser	Party	Votes
Nicholas Fernicola	Democrat	145,589	C. Robert Sarcone	Republican	128,815
Maclyn Goldman	Democrat	143,794	Irwin Kimmelman	Republican	116,205
John J. Giblin	Democrat	143,040	James E. Churchman, Jr.	Republican	112,995
Hutchins F. Inge	Democrat	135,959	William F. Tompkins	Republican	112,128
			George C. Richardson	Independent	10,409
			Kendrick O. Stephenson	Independent	5,970
			David Blumgart	Independent	5,305
			Frederick Waring	Independent	44,76

== Indictment ==
Sarcone's political career was derailed in 1967 when he was indicted by an Essex County Grand Jury on a criminal charge. Later the charges were dismissed.

== Candidate for Governor of New Jersey ==
Sarcone was widely viewed as a potential candidate for the Republican nomination for Governor of New Jersey in 1965 against Gov. Hughes. He announced on April 19, 1965, that he would not be a candidate.

His defeat in the 1965 Senate re-election campaign and his 1967 indictment ended talk of a Sarcone for Governor candidacy in 1969, when term limits would prevent Hughes from running again.

Sarcone sought a political comeback in 1975 as a candidate for Essex County Republican Chairman, but lost to the incumbent, Frederic Remington, in what was described as a bitter contest.

In 1977, Sarcone sought the Republican nomination for Governor, finishing third in a field of four candidates, behind State Senator Raymond Bateman and Assembly Minority Leader Thomas Kean. Bateman won 55% of the vote, followed by Kean at 36%, Sarcone at 6%, and former Moorestown Mayor William Angus with 3%. "I shouldn't have run," Sarcone said in 2010. "I was talked into it be a group of people, and it was a disaster. Two GOP guys running from Essex County. Timing is important."

== Later life ==
Sarcone was an early backer of Ronald Reagan's campaigns for the presidency. On June 11, 1979, Reagan came to New Jersey to help Sarcone retire the debt from his gubernatorial bid. This upset the Essex County Republican Chairman, John Renna, who had backed Bateman for the nomination. Sarcone, who later became a resident of Cedar Grove, New Jersey, died on January 12, 2020. He was 94 years old.
