= Martin L. Greenberg =

American politician and jurist (1932–2024)

Member of the New Jersey Senate from the 28th district
- In office January 9, 1974 – August 1979
- Preceded by: Ralph DeRose
- Succeeded by: John Caufield

Personal details
- Born: February 24, 1932 New York City, U.S.
- Died: March 22, 2024 (aged 92)
- Education: Rutgers University, Rutgers University Law School

Martin L. Greenberg (February 24, 1932 – March 22, 2024) was an American Democratic Party politician and jurist who served in the New Jersey State Senate from 1974 to 1979.

== Education and early career ==
Greenberg was born in Brooklyn, New York, on February 24, 1932. His family later moved to Newark, New Jersey, and he attended Weequahic High School, where his classmate in the class of 1950 was author Philip Roth. He was a 1954 graduate of Rutgers University and received his law degree from Rutgers Law School in 1956. He served as an Assistant Counsel to Governor Robert B. Meyner and as Assistant Essex County Prosecutor. Greenberg was a law partner of Governor Brendan Byrne at Teltser, Byrne, Greenberg, Margolis & Franconero.

In 1973, while a candidate for State Senator, Greenberg was named Political Director of Brendan Byrne's campaign for the Democratic gubernatorial nomination.

== New Jersey State Senator ==
Greenberg was an unsuccessful Democratic candidate for State Senator in 1971. He was elected to the State Senate in 1973, defeating Republican Joseph Galluzzi, the President of the Irvington Town Council, by 8,689 votes, 22,290 (60.31%) to 13,601 (36.80%). He was re-elected to a second term in 1977, defeating Rev. James A. Pindar, a Catholic priest and a professor at Seton Hall University, 16,986 (57.80%) to 11,399 (38.79%), with former Democratic State Senator Nicholas Fernicola, running as an Independent, receiving 770 votes (2.62%).

During his six years as a Senator, Greenberg served as Chair of the Senate Judiciary Committee.

Greenberg resigned from the Senate in 1979 to become President and General Counsel to the Golden Nugget casino to assist in its efforts to obtain a gambling license in Atlantic City.

== Later career ==
After leaving the casino industry, he was appointed by Governor Jim Florio to serve as the General Counsel to the New Jersey Turnpike Authority. Florio appointed him to serve as a New Jersey Superior Court Judge in 1992. He was the Presiding Judge in Hudson County, and served in the Chancery, General Equity, and Probate divisions. After retiring from the bench in 2003, Greenberg became of counsel at Walder Hayden.

== Death ==
Greenberg died on March 22, 2024, at the age of 92. His daughter Jen serves as a South Orange village trustee.
