= Maclyn Goldman =

American politician (1901–1977)

Maclyn S. (MacyLyn) Goldman (December 11, 1901 – November 18, 1977) was an American Democratic Party politician, lawyer and businessman. He represented Essex County in the New Jersey State Senate from 1966 to 1968. Goldman served as a Municipal Court Judge in West Orange, New Jersey and as the long time West Orange Democratic Municipal Chairman. He was the Essex County Treasurer. He was elected State Senator in 1965, but lost his bid for re-election in 1967 to Republican James Wallwork. He was a graduate of New York University and Rutgers Law School.

== Personal life ==
Irving B. Goldman, President of the American Academy of Facial Plastic and Reconstructive Surgery, is his brother.

== 1965 Essex County State Senator General Election Results ==
Winner	Party	Votes	Loser	Party	Votes
Nicholas Fernicola	Democrat	145,589	C. Robert Sarcone	Republican	128,815
Maclyn Goldman	Democrat	143,794	Irwin Kimmelman	Republican	116,205
John J. Giblin	Democrat	143,040	James E. Churchman, Jr.	Republican	112,995
Hutchins F. Inge	Democrat	135,959	William F. Tompkins	Republican	112,128
			George C. Richardson	Independent	10,409
			Kendrick O. Stephenson	Independent	5,970
			David Blumgart	Independent	5,305
			Frederick Waring	Independent	44,76
