= Gerardo Del Tufo =

American politician and lawyer (1909-1995)

Member of the Essex County Board of Chosen Freeholders
- In office 1971–1974

Member of the New Jersey Senate from the 11th district
- In office 1968–1971

Member of the New Jersey General Assembly from Essex County
- In office 1954–1955

Personal details
- Born: Gerardo L. Del Tufo; November 6, 1909
- Died: October 14, 1995 (aged 85)
- Education: John Marshall College; John Marshall Law School

Gerardo L. Del Tufo (November 6, 1909 – October 14, 1995) was an American politician who served in the New Jersey State Legislature as a member of the Republican Party.

A lawyer from Newark, Del Tufo was a graduate of John Marshall College and John Marshall Law School. He was elected to the New Jersey General Assembly in 1953 and served one two-year term. He served on the board of education of the Newark Public Schools from 1958 to 1964. He was elected to the New Jersey State Senate in 1967. He did not seek re-election to the State Senate in 1971, but instead ran successfully for a seat on the Essex County Board of Chosen Freeholders. He lost a bid for re-election in 1974.
