= Irwin I. Kimmelman =

American politician (1930–2014)

Attorney General of New Jersey
- In office January 19, 1982 – January 21, 1986
- Governor: Thomas Kean
- Preceded by: James R. Zazzali
- Succeeded by: W. Cary Edwards

Personal details
- Born: September 10, 1930
- Died: September 12, 2014 (aged 84)
- Party: Republican
- Education: Rutgers University; Harvard University

Irwin I. Kimmelman (September 10, 1930 – September 12, 2014, Newark, New Jersey) was a politician who served in both houses of the New Jersey Legislature and served as the Attorney General of New Jersey from 1982 – 1986.

== Biography ==
Kimmelman graduated from Weequahic High School and studied accounting at the Rutgers University School of Business Administration, graduating in 1952. He entered Harvard Law School, where he won the Roscoe Pound Prize for brief writing and oral argument, and graduated in 1955. He was admitted to the New Jersey Bar the following year after a clerkship with Superior Court Judge Edward Gaulkin.

Kimmelman served in the New Jersey General Assembly for one term, from 1964 to 1966. He was an unsuccessful candidate for State Senator in 1965.

=== 1965 Essex County State Senator general election results ===
Winner	Party	Votes	Loser	Party	Votes
Nicholas Fernicola	Democrat	145,589	C. Robert Sarcone	Republican	128,815
Maclyn Goldman	Democrat	143,794	Irwin Kimmelman	Republican	116,205
John J. Giblin	Democrat	143,040	James E. Churchman, Jr.	Republican	112,995
Hutchins F. Inge	Democrat	135,959	William F. Tompkins	Republican	112,128
			George C. Richardson	Independent	10,409
			Kendrick O. Stephenson	Independent	5,970
			David Blumgart	Independent	5,305
			Frederick Waring	Independent	44,76

He was a New Jersey Superior Court judge from May 1971 through September 1976, when he resigned to return to private law practice. He represented Thomas Kean during the recount for the 1981 gubernatorial election. After Kean won the recount, he announced his choice of Kimmelman as Attorney General on December 14, 1981. A resident of the Short Hills section of Millburn Township, Kimmelman was confirmed by the New Jersey Senate and sworn in on January 19, 1982, the day of Kean's inauguration.

Kimmelman returned to private practice in 1986 and was replaced by W. Cary Edwards. He would later return to the bench as a State Superior Court judge.

Legal offices
Preceded by James R. Zazzali	Attorney General of New Jersey; 1982 – 1986	Succeeded by W. Cary Edwards
