= Nicholas Fernicola =

American politician (1903–1982)

Nicholas T. Fernicola

Member of the New Jersey Senate from the 11th District (at-large)
- In office January 11, 1966 – January 9, 1968
- Preceded by: C. Robert Sarcone
- Succeeded by: Multi-member district

Essex County Counsel
- In office January 1959 – December 1965

City of Newark Criminal Court Judge
- In office 1948–1959

Personal details
- Born: April 8, 1903
- Died: February 7, 1982 (aged 78)

Nicholas T. Fernicola (August 8, 1903 – February 7, 1982) was an American Democratic Party politician who served as a New Jersey State senator. He was a Criminal Court Judge for the City of Newark from 1948 to 1959, and was appointed Essex County Counsel in 1959. He was elected to the New Jersey State Senate in 1965. During his two years in the Senate, Fernicola played a role in raising the state contribution to junior colleges from $200 per student to $600. He was an unsuccessful candidate for re-election to a second term in 1967. He was the liaison officer between the Newark City Council and the New Jersey Legislature from 1972 to 1975. In 1977, Fernicola ran for State Senator as an Independent against incumbent Martin L. Greenberg and received 2.6% of the vote.

== 1965 Essex County State Senator General Election results ==
Winner	Party	Votes	Loser	Party	Votes
Nicholas Fernicola	Democrat	145,589	C. Robert Sarcone	Republican	128,815
Maclyn Goldman	Democrat	143,794	Irwin Kimmelman	Republican	116,205
John J. Giblin	Democrat	143,040	James E. Churchman, Jr.	Republican	112,995
Hutchins F. Inge	Democrat	135,959	William F. Tompkins	Republican	112,128
			George C. Richardson	Independent	10,409
			Kendrick O. Stephenson	Independent	5,970
			David Blumgart	Independent	5,305
			Frederick Waring	Independent	44,76
