= Hutchins F. Inge =

American physician and politician

Member of the New Jersey Senate from the 11th district
- In office 1966–1968
- Preceded by: C. Robert Sarcone

Personal details
- Born: Hutschins Franklin Inge; April 16, 1900 Charlottesville, Virginia, U.S.
- Died: March 28, 2002 (aged 101) New Bedford, Massachusetts, U.S.
- Party: Democratic
- Spouse: Dorothy E. Helme (m. 1970; died 1996)
- Education: University of Minnesota; Howard University
- Occupation: Physician and politician

Hutchins Franklin Inge (April 16, 1900 – March 28, 2002) was an American physician and Democratic Party politician. He was the first African American to serve in the New Jersey Senate.

== Early life and career ==
Inge was born in Charlottesville, Virginia, in 1900 to George and Kate Ferguson Inge. In May 1921 at the University of Minnesota, Inge became a charter member of Xi chapter of Omega Psi Phi fraternity. He graduated from the University of Minnesota College of Pharmacy and Howard University College of Medicine.

Inge began his medical practice in Newark, New Jersey, in 1936. He served on the staff of United Presbyterian Hospital in Newark and was also staff physician for the Newark Board of Health's Division of Child Hygiene. He was director of the Essex Urban League and a founder of the Council of Doers, professional men dedicated to community service. He was also a life member of the NAACP and a member of the American Medical Association.

== Political career ==
In 1965, at the age of 65, Inge was nominated by the Essex County Democratic organization as a candidate for the State Senate. He was one of four Senate candidates on the county slate, after a temporary reapportionment plan awarded Essex (as well as Bergen County) the right to elect four instead of one senators. All four Democratic candidates were elected to office, in a year when Governor Richard J. Hughes was reelected in a landslide and Democrats took control of both houses of the legislature.

=== 1965 Essex County State Senator General Election Results ===
Winner	Party	Votes	Loser	Party	Votes
Nicholas Fernicola	Democrat	145,589	C. Robert Sarcone	Republican	128,815
Maclyn Goldman	Democrat	143,794	Irwin Kimmelman	Republican	116,205
John J. Giblin	Democrat	143,040	James E. Churchman, Jr.	Republican	112,995
Hutchins F. Inge	Democrat	135,959	William F. Tompkins	Republican	112,128
			George C. Richardson	Independent	10,409
			Kendrick O. Stephenson	Independent	5,970
			David Blumgart	Independent	5,305
			Frederick Waring	Independent	44,76

During Inge's tenure in the Senate from 1966 to 1968, he served as the chairman of the Senate Federal and Interstate Relations Committee. He was a supporter of measures to aid education, transportation, and housing.

== Later life ==
In 1970 Inge married Dorothy E. Helme and moved to Osterville, Massachusetts, on Cape Cod. He continued his medical practice at his residence there until his retirement in 1995. His wife died on December 25, 1996, at the age of 82. Inge died on March 28, 2002, at the age of 101 at St. Luke's Hospital in New Bedford, Massachusetts, where he lived after his wife's death.

In 2007, Governor Jon Corzine signed a bill commemorating the achievements of Inge, along with Walter G. Alexander, the first African American to serve in the New Jersey General Assembly.

== See also ==
- List of African-American officeholders (1900–1959)
