= Milton Waldor =

American politician (1924–1975)

Milton A. Waldor (September 28, 1924 – August 20, 1975) was an American Republican Party politician who served in the New Jersey State Senate from 1968 to 1972, representing Essex County in the 11th Legislative District.

== Early life ==
Born in Newark, New Jersey, Waldor graduated from Weequahic High School and Rutgers Law School.

Prior to him becoming an attorney and politician, he served in the Air Force as the First Lieutenant and also was bombardier in the Tenth Air Force in the China Burma India Theater during World War II.

Waldor flew on 68 arduous missions, bombing the Japanese installations in captured Burma. Many times his B-24 Liberator was the target for enemy fighter planes and anti-aircraft guns. Flying the China-Burma-India hump was always an extremely dangerous mission. For his bravery in action, He was awarded the Distinguished Flying Cross, the Air Medal with Oak Leaf Cluster, the Nationalist China Award and other American medals. On his many missions he met and became friendly with General Claire Chennault, the leader of the Flying Tigers, who later became the commander of the U.S. Air Force in China. When Waldor left the Air Force to return to civilian life, he was a captain. He married and divorced shortly thereafter in the context of rumored domestic violence and undiagnosed post-traumatic stress disorder caused by his active combat experience.

== Elected office ==
An attorney from West Orange, Waldor was elected to the State Senate in 1967. He lost a bid for re-election to a second term in 1971. In 1972, he ran for the U.S. House of Representatives in New Jersey's 11th congressional district, but lost to incumbent Democrat Joseph Minish. He authored the book Peddlers of Fear that described the dangers of the extreme right that had been embodied by the John Birch Society in the early 1960s.
