= 1971 New Jersey Senate election =

1971 New Jersey Senate elections
- November 2, 1971

All 40 seats in the New Jersey State Senate 21 seats needed for a majority
- Turnout: 62% (▼2pp)
	Majority party	Minority party
Leader	Raymond Bateman	J. Edward Crabiel
Party	Republican	Democratic
Leader's seat	8th (Branchburg)	7th (Milltown)
Last election	31	9
Seats before	28	9
Seats won	24	16
Seat change	▼4	▲7
Popular vote	919,262	902,180
Senate President before election
Raymond Bateman
Republican
Elected Senate President
Raymond Bateman
Republican

The 1971 New Jersey State Senate election were held on November 2, 1971, during William T. Cahill's term as governor of New Jersey. The Democratic Party gained seven seats, breaking the Republican supermajority in the Senate and narrowing the majority significantly.

Primary elections were held on June 8.

== Background ==
=== Reapportioning ===
Until 1965, the New Jersey Senate was composed of 21 senators, with each county electing one. However, the 1964 Supreme Court of the United States decision Reynolds v. Sims required state legislative districts to be approximately equal in population. From 1965 through 1973, New Jersey legislative districts were repeatedly modified to comply with the ruling.

In 1965, the Senate was increased to 29 members, with larger counties apportioned multiple seats and smaller counties sharing one or two senators. In 1967, the Senate was increased further to 40 members, which continued to generally follow county lines. In 1971, districts were redrawn by the New Jersey Apportionment Commission to reflect population changes following the 1970 United States census. One seat was eliminated in each of Essex and Hudson, replaced by new seats in Burlington and Monmouth. District 6 (comprising Mercer and Hunterdon counties) also switched from electing its senators at-large to electing them from two single-member districts because it became composed of more than one county. The changes, which moved representation away from the urban counties and towards the suburbs, generally favored the Republican Party.

The new districts were divided as follows:

District	Counties	#
1	Cape May and Cumberland	1
2	Atlantic	1
3A	Salem and Gloucester (part)	1
3B	Gloucester (part) and Camden (part)	1
3C	Camden (part)	1
4A	Ocean (part)	1
4B	Burlington (part) and Ocean (part)	1
4C	Burlington (part)	1
5	Monmouth	3
6A	Hunterdon and Mercer (part)	1
6B	Mercer (part)	1
7	Middlesex	3
8	Somerset	1
9	Union	3
10	Morris	2
11	Essex	5
12	Hudson	3
13	Bergen	5
14	Passaic	3
15	Warren and Sussex	1

=== New seats ===
- District 4C was created out of Burlington County.
- District 5 (Monmouth County) gained one seat.

=== Seats eliminated ===
- District 11 (Essex County) lost one seat.
- District 12 (Hudson County) lost one seat.

== Retirements ==
A total of 15 senators (3 Democrats and 12 Republicans) retired.

=== Democratic ===
1. District 6A: Richard J. Coffee retired.
2. District 6B: Sido L. Ridolfi retired.
3. District 12: Frank J. Guarini retired.

=== Republican ===
1. District 1: Robert E. Kay retired.
2. District 3A: John L. White retired.
3. District 3B: Hugh A. Kelly Jr. retired.
4. District 4A: William Hiering retired.
5. District 10: Harry L. Sears retired.
6. District 11: Gerardo Del Tufo retired to run for Essex County freeholder.
7. District 11: Alexander Matturri retired.
8. District 13: Fairleigh Dickinson Jr. retired.
9. District 14: Frank Sciro retired.
10. District 14: Ira Schoem retired.
11. District 14: Edward Sisco retired.

== Resignations ==
=== Republicans ===
1. District 4B: Edwin B. Forsythe resigned in November 1970 following his election to the U.S. House of Representatives.
2. District 9: Nicholas LaCorte resigned December 7, 1970 following his appointment as a tax judge.
3. District 11: David W. Dowd resigned November 16, 1970 to become general counsel of the New Jersey Turnpike Authority.

== Incumbents defeated ==
=== In primary elections ===
==== Democratic ====
1. District 12: Frederick Hauser lost to James P. Dugan.

=== In general elections ===
==== Republican ====
Two incumbent Republican senators were defeated for re-election:

1. District 2: Frank S. Farley (first elected in 1941) lost to Joseph McGahn.
2. District 11: Milton Waldor (first elected in 1967) lost to Ralph DeRose.

==== Independent ====
One Republican was denied party support and ran in the general election as an independent:

1. District 13: Willard Knowlton lost to Harold C. Hollenbeck.

== Open seats that changed parties ==
=== Republican seats won by Democrats ===
1. District 3B: won by Joseph A. Maressa.
2. District 11: won by Wynona Lipman and Frank J. Dodd.
3. District 14: won by Joseph Lazzara, William J. Bate, and Joseph Hirkala.

=== Democratic seats won by Republicans ===
1. District 6A: won by William E. Schluter. (Note: Schluter succeeded Richard J. Coffee, who had been elected from District 6 at-large in 1967.)

== Open seats that parties held ==
=== Democratic holds ===
1. District 6B: won by Joseph P. Merlino. (Note: Merlino succeeded Sido Ridolfi, who had been elected from District 6 at-large in 1967.)

=== Republican holds ===
1. District 1: won by James Cafiero.
2. District 3A: won by James M. Turner.
3. District 4A: won by John F. Brown.
4. District 4B: won by Barry T. Parker. (Note: Parker also won a special election to complete the remaining months of the unexpired term for the seat, which had been vacated by Edwin T. Forsythe.)
5. District 9: won by Jerome Epstein. (Note: A special election to complete the remaining months of the unexpired term for the seat, which had been vacated by Nicholas LaCorte, was won by Jerry English of the Democratic Party.)
6. District 10: won by Peter W. Thomas.
7. District 13: won by Frederick Wendel.

== Newly created seats ==
=== Democratic gain ===
1. District 4C: Won by Edward J. Hughes Jr.

=== Republican gain ===
1. District 5: Won by Joseph Azzolina.

== Summary of results by district ==
District	Incumbent	Party	Elected Senator	Party
District 1	Robert E. Kay	Rep	James Cafiero	Rep
District 2	Frank S. Farley	Rep	Joseph McGahn	Dem
District 3A	John L. White	Rep	James M. Turner	Rep
District 3B	Hugh A. Kelly	Rep	Joseph Maressa	Dem
District 3C	John L. Miller	Rep	John L. Miller	Rep
District 3D	Frank C. Italiano	Rep	Frank C. Italiano	Rep
District 4A	William Hiering	Rep	John F. Brown	Rep
District 4B	Vacant (Note: The seat was left vacant by the resignation of Edwin B. Forsythe, who was sworn into the U.S. House of Representatives in January 1971.)		Barry T. Parker	Rep
District 4C	New seat		Edward J. Hughes	Dem
District 5	Richard Stout	Rep	Richard Stout	Rep
District 5	Alfred Beadleston	Rep	Alfred Beadleston	Rep
District 5	New seat		Joseph Azzolina	Rep
District 6 (Note: Split into Districts 6A and 6B.)	Richard J. Coffee	Dem	William Schluter	Rep
District 6	Sido L. Ridolfi	Dem	Joseph P. Merlino	Dem
District 7	John A. Lynch Sr.	Dem	John A. Lynch Sr.	Dem
District 7	J. Edward Crabiel	Dem	J. Edward Crabiel	Dem
District 7	Norman Tanzman	Dem	Norman Tanzman	Dem
District 8	Raymond Bateman	Rep	Raymond Bateman	Rep
District 9	Frank X. McDermott	Rep	Frank X. McDermott	Rep
District 9	Matt Rinaldo	Rep	Matt Rinaldo	Rep
District 9	Vacant (Note: The third Union seat was vacant after Nicholas LaCorte resigned in 1970. A special election was held simultaneously to complete the remainder of LaCorte's term (November 1971–January 1972) and was won by Democrat Jerry Fitzgerald English.)		Jerome Epstein	Rep
District 10	Joseph Maraziti	Rep	Joseph Maraziti	Rep
District 10	Harry L. Sears	Rep	Peter W. Thomas	Rep
District 11	James Wallwork	Rep	James Wallwork	Rep
District 11	Vacant (Note: The seat was left vacant by the resignation of David W. Dowd, who became general counsel of the New Jersey Turnpike Authority.)		Frank J. Dodd	Dem
District 11	Michael Giuliano	Rep	Michael Giuliano	Rep
District 11	Milton Waldor	Rep	Ralph DeRose	Dem
District 11	Geraldo Del Tufo	Rep	Wynona Lipman	Dem
District 11	Alexander Matturri	Rep	Seat eliminated	
District 12	Frederick Hauser	Dem	James P. Dugan	Dem
District 12	William F. Kelly Jr.	Dem	William F. Kelly Jr.	Dem
District 12	William Musto	Dem	William Musto	Dem
District 12	Frank J. Guarini	Dem	Seat eliminated	
District 13	Willard Knowlton	Rep	Harold Hollenbeck	Rep
District 13	Joseph Woodcock	Rep	Joseph Woodcock	Rep
District 13	Fairleigh Dickinson Jr.	Rep	Frederick Wendel	Rep
District 13	Alfred Schiaffo	Rep	Alfred Schiaffo	Rep
District 13	Garrett Hagedorn	Rep	Garrett Hagedorn	Rep
District 14	Edward Sisco	Rep	Joseph Hirkala	Dem
District 14	Ira Schoem	Rep	William J. Bate	Dem
District 14	Frank Sciro	Rep	Joseph Lazzara	Dem
District 15	Wayne Dumont Jr.	Rep	Wayne Dumont Jr.	Rep

=== Close races ===
Seats where the margin of victory was under 10%:

1. District 1, 1.6%
2. District 3D, 1.6%
3. District 3A, 0.02%
4. District 4C, 3.1% gain
5. District 5A, 4.2%
6. District 5B, 4.2%
7. District 5C, 2.8% gain
8. District 7A, 7.2%
9. District 7B, 6.8%
10. District 7C, 7.0%
11. District 9A, 5.6%
12. District 9B, 2.9%
13. District 9C, 1.1% gain
14. District 13A, 2.2%
15. District 13B, 2.3%
16. District 13C, 2.1%
17. District 13D, 2.0%
18. District 13E, 2.3%
19. District 14A, 6.0% gain
20. District 14B, 4.9% gain
21. District 14C, 4.8% gain

== District 1 ==
=== Democratic primary ===
==== Candidates ====
- Paul R. Porreca, former member of the Millville city commission and nominee for U.S. House in 1962

==== Results ====
1971 Democratic primary
Party	Candidate	Votes	%
Democratic	Paul R. Porreca	2,590	100.00%
Total votes		2,590	100.00%

=== Republican primary ===
==== Candidates ====
- James Cafiero, assemblyman from North Wildwood

==== Results ====
1971 Republican primary
Party	Candidate	Votes	%
Republican	James Cafiero	12,603	100.00%
Total votes		12,603	100.00%

=== General election ===
==== Candidates ====
- James Cafiero, assemblyman from North Wildwood (Republican)
- John W. Gotsch (People's)
- Paul R. Porreca, former member of the Millville city commission and nominee for U.S. House in 1962 (Democratic)

==== Results ====
1971 New Jersey Senate election
Party	Candidate	Votes	%
Republican	James S. Cafiero	28,014	50.0
Democratic	Paul R. Porreca	27,098	48.4
People's	John W. Gotsch	867	1.5
Total votes		55,979	100.0
Republican hold			

== District 2 ==
=== Democratic primary ===
==== Candidates ====
- Joseph McGahn, mayor of Absecon
- Bernice Paul, Northfield resident

==== Results ====
1971 Democratic primary
Party	Candidate	Votes	%
Democratic	Joseph McGahn	4,408	64.06%
Democratic	Bernice Paul	2,473	35.94%
Total votes		6,881	100.00%

=== Republican primary ===
==== Candidates ====
- Frank S. Farley, incumbent senator since 1941

==== Results ====
1971 Republican primary
Party	Candidate	Votes	%
Republican	Frank S. Farley (incumbent)	12,412	100.00%
Total votes		12,412	100.00%

=== General election ===
==== Candidates ====
- Frank S. Farley, incumbent senator since 1941 (Republican)
- Joseph McGahn, mayor of Absecon (Democratic)
- Charles Ross (Independent)

==== Results ====
1971 New Jersey Senate election
Party	Candidate	Votes	%
Democratic	Joseph L. McGahn	39,257	58.1%
Republican	Frank S. Farley (incumbent)	27,509	40.7%
Independent	Charles Ross	840	1.2%
Total votes		67,606	100.0%
Democratic gain from Republican			

== District 3A ==
=== Democratic primary ===
==== Candidates ====
- Louis J. Damminger Jr., former mayor of Paulsboro

==== Results ====
1971 Democratic primary
Party	Candidate	Votes	%
Democratic	Louis J. Damminger Jr.	3,479	100.00%
Total votes		3,479	100.00%

=== Republican primary ===
==== Candidates ====
- James M. Turner, assemblyman from Woodbury

==== Results ====
1971 Republican primary
Party	Candidate	Votes	%
Republican	James M. Turner	3,920	100.00%
Total votes		3,920	100.00%

=== General election ===
==== Candidates ====
- Louis J. Damminger Jr., former mayor of Paulsboro (Democratic)
- James M. Turner, assemblyman from Woodbury (Republican)

==== Results ====
1971 New Jersey Senate election
Party	Candidate	Votes	%
Republican	James M. Turner	26,424	50.01%
Democratic	Louis J. Damminger Jr.	26,413	49.99%
Total votes		52,837	100.00%
Republican hold			

== District 3B ==
=== Democratic primary ===
==== Candidates ====
- Joseph A. Maressa, Berlin attorney

==== Results ====
1971 Democratic primary
Party	Candidate	Votes	%
Democratic	Joseph A. Maressa	4,102	100.00%
Total votes		4,102	100.00%

=== Republican primary ===
==== Candidates ====
- George E. Lord, Bellmawr resident

==== Results ====
1971 Republican primary
Party	Candidate	Votes	%
Republican	George E. Lord	3,723	100.00%
Total votes		3,723	100.00%

=== General election ===
==== Candidates ====
- George E. Lord, Bellmawr resident (Republican)
- Joseph A. Maressa, Berlin attorney (Democratic)

==== Results ====
1971 New Jersey Senate election
Party	Candidate	Votes	%
Democratic	Joseph A. Maressa	27,347	56.3%
Republican	George E. Lord	21,266	43.7%
Total votes		48,613	100.0%
Democratic gain from Republican			

== District 3C ==
=== Democratic primary ===
==== Candidates ====
- Richard F. McCarthy, Camden County highway inspector and West Berlin tax collector (One Democrat for Tax Reforms Now)
- Morton H. Rappaport, Cherry Hill resident (Regular Democratic Organization)

==== Results ====
1971 Democratic primary
Party	Candidate	Votes	%
Democratic	Morton H. Rappaport	2,019	68.21%
Democratic	Richard F. McCarthy	951	31.79%
Total votes		2,960	100.00%

=== Republican primary ===
==== Candidates ====
- John L. Miller, incumbent senator since 1968

==== Results ====
1971 Republican primary
Party	Candidate	Votes	%
Republican	John L. Miller (incumbent)	4,531	
Total votes		4,531	100.00%

=== General election ===
==== Candidates ====
- John L. Miller, incumbent senator since 1968 (Republican)
- Morton H. Rappaport, Cherry Hill resident (Democratic)

==== Results ====
1971 New Jersey Senate election
Party	Candidate	Votes	%
Republican	John L. Miller (incumbent)	28,345	57.2
Democratic	Morton H. Rappaport	21,168	42.8
Total votes		49,513	100.0

== District 3D ==
=== Democratic primary ===
==== Candidates ====
- Thomas R. Bristow, principal of Woodrow Wilson High School

==== Results ====
1971 Democratic primary
Party	Candidate	Votes	%
Democratic	Thomas R. Bristow	3,693	100.00%
Total votes		3,693	100.00%

=== Republican primary ===
==== Candidates ====
- Frank Italiano, incumbent senator since 1968

==== Results ====
1971 Republican primary
Party	Candidate	Votes	%
Republican	Frank Italiano (incumbent)	2,211	100.00%
Total votes		2,211	100.00%

=== General election ===
==== Candidates ====
- Thomas R. Bristow, principal of Woodrow Wilson High School (Democratic)
- Frank C. Italiano, incumbent senator since 1968 (Republican)

==== Results ====
1971 New Jersey Senate election
Party	Candidate	Votes	%
Republican	Frank C. Italiano (incumbent)	22,312	50.8
Democratic	Thomas R. Bristow	21,615	49.2
Total votes		43,927	100.0
Republican hold			

== District 4A ==
=== Democratic primary ===
==== Candidates ====
- Wesley K. Bell, member of the Stafford Township committee (Maverick Democrat)
- John F. Russo, assistant Ocean County prosecutor (Regular Democratic Organization)

==== Results ====
1971 Democratic primary
Party	Candidate	Votes	%
Democratic	John F. Russo	2,839	75.69%
Democratic	Wesley K. Bell	912	24.31%
Total votes		3,751	100.00%

=== Republican primary ===
==== Candidates ====
- John F. Brown, assemblyman from Lakewood (Regular Republican)
- George F. Makin, Ocean County freeholder (Regular Republican Organization)

==== Results ====
1971 Republican primary
Party	Candidate	Votes	%
Republican	John F. Brown	11,399	63.30%
Republican	George F. Makin	6,610	36.70%
Total votes		18,009	100.00%

=== General election ===
==== Candidates ====
- John F. Russo, assistant Ocean County prosecutor (Democratic)
- John F. Brown, assemblyman from Lakewood (Republican)

==== Results ====
1971 New Jersey Senate election
Party	Candidate	Votes	%
Republican	John F. Brown	30,272	53.4%
Democratic	John F. Russo	26,378	46.6%
Total votes		56,650	100.00%
Republican hold			

== District 4B (special) ==
=== General election ===
==== Candidates ====
- Walter L. Smith Jr., assemblyman from Cinnaminson (Republican)
- Charles B. Yates, industrialist and nominee for Assembly in 1969 and U.S. House in 1970 (Democratic)

==== Results ====
Special election, March 2, 1971
Party	Candidate	Votes	%
Republican	Walter L. Smith	10,389	60.4
Democratic	Charles B. Yates	6,798	39.6
Total votes		17,187	100.0

== District 4B ==
=== Democratic primary ===
==== Candidates ====
- Fred M. Detrick Jr., chair of the Pemberton Township planning board

==== Results ====
1971 Democratic primary
Party	Candidate	Votes	%
Democratic	Fred M. Detrick Jr.	2,449	100.00%
Total votes		2,449	100.00%

=== Republican primary ===
==== Candidates ====
- Barry T. Parker, speaker of the General Assembly from Mount Holly

==== Results ====
1971 Republican primary
Party	Candidate	Votes	%
Republican	Barry T. Parker	6,648	100.00%
Total votes		6,648	100.00%

=== General election ===
==== Candidates ====
- Fred M. Detrick Jr., chair of the Pemberton Township planning board (Democratic)
- Barry T. Parker, speaker of the General Assembly from Mount Holly (Republican)

==== Results ====
1971 New Jersey Senate election
Party	Candidate	Votes	%
Republican	Barry T. Parker	22,929	62.5%
Democratic	Fred M. Detrick Jr.	13,737	37.5%
Total votes		36,666	100.0
Republican hold			

== District 4C ==
=== Democratic primary ===
==== Candidates ====
- Edward J. Hughes Jr., Cinnaminson industrialist

==== Results ====
1971 Democratic primary
Party	Candidate	Votes	%
Democratic	Edward J. Hughes Jr.	4,260	100.00%
Total votes		4,260	100.00%

=== Republican primary ===
==== Candidates ====
- Walter L. Smith Jr., incumbent senator since March 1971

==== Results ====
1971 Republican primary
Party	Candidate	Votes	%
Republican	Walter L. Smith Jr. (incumbent)	5,604	
Total votes		5,604	100.00%

=== General election ===
==== Candidates ====
- Edward J. Hughes Jr., Cinnaminson industrialist (Democratic)
- Walter L. Smith Jr., incumbent senator since March 1971 (Republican)

==== Results ====
1971 New Jersey Senate election
Party	Candidate	Votes	%
Democratic	Edward J. Hughes Jr.	24,043	51.1
Republican	Walter L. Smith Jr. (incumbent)	22,580	48.0
Socialist Labor	Bernardo S. Doganiero	435	0.9
Total votes		47,058	100.0
Democratic gain from Republican			

== District 5 ==
=== Democratic primary ===
==== Candidates ====
- William Himelman, Lincroft attorney (Democratic)
- Walter Gehricke, former mayor of Matawan Township (Democratic)
- Vincent Miller, Long Branch resident (Democratic)

==== Results ====
1971 Democratic primary
Party	Candidate	Votes	%
Democratic	William Himelman	6,821	33.42%
Democratic	Vicnent Miller	6,820	33.42%
Democratic	Walter Gehricke	6,766	33.16%
Total votes		20,407	100.00%

=== Republican primary ===
==== Candidates ====
- Joseph Azzolina, assemblyman from Middletown
- Alfred N. Beadleston, incumbent senator since 1968
- Richard R. Stout, incumbent senator since 1952

==== Results ====
1971 Republican primary
Party	Candidate	Votes	%
Republican	Richard R. Stout (incumbent)	11,130	33.90%
Republican	Alfred N. Beadleston (incumbent)	10,984	33.45%
Republican	Joseph Azzolina	10,721	32.65%
Total votes		32,835	100.00%

=== General election ===
==== Candidates ====
- Joseph Azzolina, assemblyman from Middletown (Republican)
- Alfred N. Beadleston, incumbent senator since 1968 (Republican)
- William Himelman, Lincroft attorney (Democratic)
- Walter Gehricke, former mayor of Matawan Township (Democratic)
- Vincent Miller, Long Branch resident (Democratic)
- Richard R. Stout, incumbent senator since 1952 (Republican)

==== Results ====
1971 New Jersey Senate election
Party	Candidate	Votes	%
Republican	Richard R. Stout (incumbent)	69,067	19.4%
Republican	Alfred N. Beadleston (incumbent)	68,555	19.3%
Republican	Joseph Azzolina	60,199	16.9%
Democratic	Vincent Miller	53,902	15.2%
Democratic	William Himelman	53,861	15.1%
Democratic	Walter Gehricke	50,201	14.1%
Total votes		355,785	100.00%
Republican hold			

== District 6A ==
=== Democratic primary ===
==== Candidates ====
- Robert R. Klein, Mercer County administrator and former aide president Lyndon B. Johnson and aide to governor Richard J. Hughes

==== Results ====
1971 Democratic primary
Party	Candidate	Votes	%
Democratic	Robert R. Klein	3,652	100.00%
Total votes		3,652	100.00%

=== Republican primary ===
==== Candidates ====
- William E. Schluter, assemblyman from Pennington

==== Results ====
1971 Republican primary
Party	Candidate	Votes	%
Republican	William E. Schluter		
Total votes			100.00%

=== General election ===
==== Candidates ====
- Robert R. Klein, Mercer County administrator and former aide president Lyndon B. Johnson and aide to governor Richard J. Hughes (Democratic)
- William E. Schluter, assemblyman from Pennington (Republican)

==== Results ====
1971 New Jersey Senate election
Party	Candidate	Votes	%
Republican	William E. Schluter	31,072	55.3%
Democratic	Robert R. Klein	25,091	44.7%
Total votes		56,163	100.00%
Republican gain from Democratic			

== District 6B ==
=== Democratic primary ===
==== Candidates ====
- Joseph P. Merlino, assemblyman from Trenton

==== Results ====
1971 Democratic primary
Party	Candidate	Votes	%
Democratic	Joseph P. Merlino	4,659	100.00%
Total votes		4,659	100.00%

=== Republican primary ===
==== Candidates ====
- Lee J. Millas, Trenton resident

==== Results ====
1971 Republican primary
Party	Candidate	Votes	%
Republican	Lee J. Millas	1,030	100.00%
Total votes		1,030	100.00%

=== General election ===
==== Candidates ====
- Charles A. Delehey, Trenton attorney (Republican)
- Joseph P. Merlino, assemblyman from Trenton (Democratic)

==== Results ====
1971 New Jersey Senate election
Party	Candidate	Votes	%
Democratic	Joseph P. Merlino	29,758	70.0
Republican	Charles A. Delehey	12,740	30.0
Total votes		42,498	100.0
Democratic hold			

== District 7 ==
District 7 consisted of all of Middlesex County.

=== Democratic primary ===
==== Candidates ====
- J. Edward Crabiel, incumbent senator since 1966
- John A. Lynch, incumbent senator since 1956
- Norman Tanzman, incumbent senator since 1968

==== Results ====
1971 Democratic primary
Party	Candidate	Votes	%
Democratic	John A. Lynch (incumbent)	19,687	33.51%
Democratic	Norman Tanzman (incumbent)	19,540	33.26%
Democratic	J. Edward Crabiel (incumbent)	19,525	33.23%
Total votes		58,752	100.00%

=== Republican primary ===
==== Candidates ====
- Francis J. Coury, Middlesex County freeholder and former assemblyman from Highland Park (Republican)
- Charles C. Griffith, Jamesburg resident (Republican)
- Leonard A. Tobias, South Plainfield history teacher (Republican)

==== Results ====
1971 Republican primary
Party	Candidate	Votes	%
Republican	Francis J. Coury	5,446	33.44%
Republican	Leonard A. Tobias	5,439	33.39%
Republican	Charles C. Griffith	5,402	33.17%
Total votes		16,287	100.00%

=== General election ===
==== Candidates ====
- Francis J. Coury, Middlesex County freeholder and former assemblyman from Highland Park (Republican)
- J. Edward Crabiel, incumbent senator since 1966 (Democratic)
- Edward R. Gavarny (Americans for ERG)
- Charles C. Griffith, Jamesburg resident (Republican)
- John A. Lynch, incumbent senator since 1956 (Democratic)
- Leonard A. Tobias, South Plainfield history teacher (Republican)
- Norman Tanzman, incumbent senator since 1968 (Democratic)

==== Results ====
1971 New Jersey Senate election
Party	Candidate	Votes	%
Democratic	John A. Lynch (incumbent)	94,832	20.4%
Democratic	J. Edward Crabiel (incumbent)	92,637	19.9%
Democratic	Norman Tanzman (incumbent)	92,450	19.8%
Republican	Leonard A. Tobias	61,672	13.2%
Republican	Francis J. Coury	61,043	13.1%
Republican	Charles C. Griffith	59,788	12.8%
Americans For ERG	Edward R. Gavarny	3,547	0.8%
Total votes		465,969	100.00%
Democratic hold			

== District 8 ==
District 8 consisted of all of Somerset County.

=== Democratic primary ===
==== Candidates ====
- Benjamin Levine, North Plainfield attorney and former deputy attorney general of New Jersey

==== Results ====
1971 Democratic primary
Party	Candidate	Votes	%
Democratic	Benjamin Levine	2,330	100.00%
Total votes		2,330	100.00%

=== Republican primary ===
==== Candidates ====
- Raymond Bateman, incumbent senator since 1968

==== Results ====
1971 Republican primary
Party	Candidate	Votes	%
Republican	Raymond Bateman (incumbent)	5,645	100.00%
Total votes		5,645	100.00%

=== General election ===
==== Candidates ====
- Raymond Bateman, incumbent senator since 1968 (Republican)
- Benjamin Levine, North Plainfield attorney and former deputy attorney general of New Jersey (Democratic)

==== Results ====
1971 New Jersey Senate election
Party	Candidate	Votes	%
Republican	Raymond Bateman (incumbent)	37,017	70.9%
Democratic	Benjamin Levine	15,167	29.1%
Total votes		52,184	100.0
Republican hold			

== District 9 (special) ==
=== Democratic primary ===
==== Candidates ====
- Jerry Fitzgerald English, Summit attorney and environmental preservation activist

==== Results ====
1971 Democratic primary
Party	Candidate	Votes	%
Democratic	Jerry F. English	8,956	100.00%
Total votes		8,956	100.00%

=== Republican primary ===
==== Candidates ====
- Van Dyke J. Pollitt, member of the Fanwood borough council

==== Results ====
1971 Republican primary
Party	Candidate	Votes	%
Republican	Van Dyke J. Pollitt	8,128	100.00%
Total votes		8,128	100.00%

=== General election ===
==== Candidates ====
- Jerry F. English, Summit attorney and environmental preservation activist (Democratic)
- Van Dyke J. Pollitt, member of the Fanwood borough council (Republican)
- Elmer L. Sullivan (Independent Coalition)

==== Results ====
Special election, November 2, 1971
Party	Candidate	Votes	%
Democratic	Jerry F. English	73,314	50.8
Republican	Van Dyke J. Pollitt	64,798	44.9
Independent Coalition	Elmer L. Sullivan	6,305	4.4
Total votes		144,417	100.0
Democratic gain from Republican			

== District 9 ==
District 9 consisted of all of Union County.

=== Democratic primary ===
==== Candidates ====
- John T. Connor Jr., Cranford attorney and son of former U.S. secretary of commerce John T. Connor (Democratic)
- Christopher Dietz, former assistant counsel to governor Richard J. Hughes and delegate to the 1966 New Jersey constitutional convention (Democratic)
- Carmine J. Liotta, Elizabeth attorney (Democratic)

==== Results ====
1971 Democratic primary
Party	Candidate	Votes	%
Democratic	John T. Connor Jr.	9,226	34.06%
Democratic	Carmine J. Liotta	8,978	33.14%
Democratic	Christopher Dietz	8,884	32.80%
Total votes		27,088	100.00%

=== Republican primary ===
==== Candidates ====
- Jerome Epstein, Union County freeholder (Republican)
- Francis X. McDermott, incumbent senator since 1968 (Republican)
- Matt Rinaldo, incumbent senator since 1968 (Republican)

==== Results ====
1971 Republican primary
Party	Candidate	Votes	%
Republican	Matt Rinaldo (incumbent)	8,375	33.71%
Republican	Frank X. McDermott (incumbent)	8,350	33.61%
Republican	Jerome Epstein	8,122	32.69%
Total votes		24,847	100.00%

=== General election ===
==== Candidates ====
- Richard Avant (Independent Coalition)
- John T. Connor Jr., Cranford attorney and son of former U.S. secretary of commerce John T. Connor (Democratic)
- Christopher Dietz, former assistant counsel to governor Richard J. Hughes and delegate to the 1966 New Jersey constitutional convention (Democratic)
- Jerome Epstein, Union County freeholder (Republican)
- Arnold Gold (Independent Coalition)
- Carmine J. Liotta, Elizabeth attorney (Democratic)
- Francis X. McDermott, incumbent senator since 1968 (Republican)
- Matt Rinaldo, incumbent senator since 1968 (Republican)
- Elmer L. Sullivan (Independent Coalition)

==== Results ====
1971 New Jersey Senate election
Party	Candidate	Votes	%
Republican	Matt Rinaldo (incumbent)	93,608	20.6%
Republican	Frank X. McDermott (incumbent)	77,536	17.1%
Republican	Jerome Epstein	68,531	15.09%
Democratic	Carmine J. Liotta	68,131	15.00%
Democratic	Christopher Dietz	64,487	14.2%
Democratic	John T. Connor Jr.	63,884	14.1%
Independent Coalition	Elmer L. Sullivan	6,451	1.4%
Independent Coalition	Arnold Gold	6,047	1.3%
Independent Coalition	Richard Avant	5,406	1.2%
Total votes		454,081	100.00%
Republican gain from			{{{swing}}}

== District 10 ==
District 10 consisted of all of Morris County.

=== Democratic primary ===
==== Candidates ====
- Garret A. Hobart IV, Morristown attorney and great-grandson of U.S. vice president Garret Hobart (Democratic)
- James M. Kiss, Chatham resident (Democratic)

==== Results ====
1971 Democratic primary
Party	Candidate	Votes	%
Democratic	Garret A. Hobart IV	6,338	50.76%
Democratic	James M. Kiss	6,149	49.24%
Total votes		12,487	100.00%

=== Republican primary ===
==== Candidates ====
- Charles A. Covino, candidate for Senate in 1967 (Voluntary School Prayers, No New Taxes)
- Thomas J. Hillery, former senator from Boonton (Regular Republican)
- Joseph J. Maraziti, incumbent senator since 1968 (Experienced Regular Republican)
- Peter W. Thomas, Chatham resident (Experienced Regular Republican)

==== Results ====
1971 Republican primary
Party	Candidate	Votes	%
Republican	Joseph J. Maraziti (incumbent)	16,763	37.44%
Republican	Peter W. Thomas	14,200	31.72%
Republican	Thomas J. Hillery	10,211	22.81%
Republican	Charles A. Covino	3,596	8.03%
Total votes		44,770	100.00%

=== General election ===
==== Candidates ====
- Garret A. Hobart IV, Morristown attorney and great-grandson of U.S. vice president Garret Hobart (Democratic)
- Joseph J. Maraziti, incumbent senator since 1968 (Republican)
- Frank J. Schweighardt (Democratic)
- Peter W. Thomas, Chatham resident (Republican)

==== Results ====
1971 New Jersey Senate election
Party	Candidate	Votes	%
Republican	Joseph J. Maraziti (incumbent)	63,773	33.3%
Republican	Peter W. Thomas	58,532	30.5%
Democratic	Garret A. Hobart IV	35,087	18.3%
Democratic	Frank J. Schweighardt	34,396	17.9%
Total votes		191,788	100.0%
Republican Party (United States) hold		Swing	{{{swing}}}

== District 11 (special) ==
=== Democratic primary ===
==== Candidates ====
- Charles De Marco, Essex County clerk

==== Results ====
1971 Democratic primary
Party	Candidate	Votes	%
Democratic	Charles De Marco	19,140	100.00%
Total votes		19,140	100.00%

=== Republican primary ===
==== Candidates ====
- Nicholas La Spina, Essex County coroner

==== Results ====
1971 Republican primary
Party	Candidate	Votes	%
Republican	Nicholas La Spina	20,424	100.00%
Total votes		20,424	100.00%

=== General election ===
==== Candidates ====
- Charles DeMarco, Essex County clerk (Democratic)
- Nicholas LaSpina, Essex County coroner (Republican)
- Frank J. Messina, operating engineer (Essex Bi-Partisan)

==== Results ====
Special election, November 2, 1971
Party	Candidate	Votes	%
Democratic	Charles DeMarco	83,525	46.9%
Republican	Nicholas LaSpina	76,352	42.9%
Essex Bi-Partisan	Frank J. Messina	18,095	10.2%
Total votes		177,972	100.0%
Democratic gain from			

== District 11 ==
District 11 consisted of all of Essex County.

=== Democratic primary ===
==== Candidates ====
- Michael A. Blasi, former president of the Irvington township council (Essex Democratic Organization)
- Frank J. Dodd, former assemblyman from West Orange (Regular Democratic Organization)
- Ralph DeRose, South Orange attorney (Regular Democratic Organization)
- Martin L. Greenberg, former assistant Essex County prosecutor (Regular Democratic Organization)
- Joel R. Jacobson, South Orange labor organizer (Essex Democratic Organization)
- Wynona Lipman, Essex County freeholder (Regular Democratic Organization)
- Francis X. McCarthy, Newark firefighter (Essex Democratic Organization)
- Henry W. Smolen, member of the Irvington township council (Regular Democratic Organization)
- Louis M. Turco, member of the Newark city council from the East Ward (Essex Democratic Organization)
- Edward Williams, former Newark police captain (Essex Democratic Organization)

==== Results ====
1971 Democratic primary
Party	Candidate	Votes	%
Democratic	Wynona Lipman	18,754	13.98%
Democratic	Ralph DeRose	18,252	13.61%
Democratic	Frank J. Dodd	17,974	13.40%
Democratic	Martin L. Greenberg	17,655	13.16%
Democratic	Henry W. Smolen	16,381	12.21%
Democratic	Louis M. Turco	9,950	7.42%
Democratic	Joel R. Jacobson	9,174	6.84%
Democratic	Michael A. Blasi	8,869	6.61%
Democratic	Edward Williams	8,776	6.54%
Democratic	Francis X. McCarthy	8,330	6.21%
Total votes		134,115	100.00%

=== Republican primary ===
==== Candidates ====
- Donald Blasi, Newark (East Ward Republicans)
- Matthew G. Carter, mayor of Montclair (Republican Party Organization)
- Frank Crisafulli, Newark (East Ward Republicans)
- Michael Giuliano, incumbent senator since 1968 (Republican Party Organization)
- Elizabeth Juliano, Newark (East Ward Republicans)
- Sam L. Palmucci, Newark (East Ward Republicans)
- Michael A. Petti, Newark (East Ward Republicans)
- Frederic Remington, businessman and candidate for Senate in 1967 (Republican Party Organization)
- Milton Waldor, incumbent senator since 1968 (Republican Party Organization)
- James Wallwork, incumbent senator since 1968 (Republican Party Organization)

==== Results ====
1971 Republican primary
Party	Candidate	Votes	%
Republican	Michael Giuliano (incumbent)	21,386	18.49%
Republican	James Wallwork (incumbent)	20,442	17.13%
Republican	Milton Waldor (incumbent)	19,809	%
Republican	Frederic Remington	19,171	16.58%
Republican	Matthew G. Carter	19,011	16.44%
Republican	Donald Blasi	3,557	3.08%
Republican	Elizabeth Juliano	3,242	2.80%
Republican	Michael A. Petti	3,218	2.78%
Republican	Sam L. Palmucci	2,990	2.59%
Republican	Frank Crisafulli	2,830	2.45%
Total votes		115,656	100.00%

=== General election ===
==== Candidates ====
- Joseph J. Bradley (Essex Bi-Partisan)
- Matthew G. Carter, mayor of Montclair (Republican)
- Sylvester L. Casta, Verona physician (Essex Bi-Partisan)
- Frank J. Dodd, former assemblyman from West Orange (Democratic)
- Ralph DeRose, South Orange attorney (Democratic)
- John J. Giblin, former senator from Newark and Essex County freeholder (Essex Bi-Partisan)
- Michael Giuliano, incumbent senator since 1968 (Republican)
- Martin L. Greenberg, former assistant Essex County prosecutor (Democratic)
- Wynona Lipman, Essex County freeholder (Democratic)
- John F. Monica, former mayor of Orange (Essex Bi-Partisan)
- Frederic Remington, businessman and candidate for Senate in 1967 (Republican)
- Joseph A. Santiago (Unity-Victory-Progress)
- Henry W. Smolen, member of the Irvington township council (Democratic)
- Milton Waldor, incumbent senator since 1968 (Republican)
- James Wallwork, incumbent senator since 1968 (Republican)
- Richard P. Weitzman (Essex Bi-Partisan)

==== Results ====
1971 New Jersey Senate election
Party	Candidate	Votes	%
Republican	Michael Giuliano (incumbent)	92,166	9.8%
Democratic	Ralph DeRose	91,380	9.7%
Republican	James Wallwork (incumbent)	88,632	9.5%
Democratic	Frank J. Dodd	86,041	9.18%
Democratic	Wynona Lipman	85,644	9.14%
Republican	Milton Waldor (incumbent)	84,736	9.04%
Democratic	Martin L. Greenberg	82,291	8.8%
Republican	Matthew G. Carter	77,418	8.3%
Democratic	Henry W. Smolen	76,190	8.1%
Republican	Frederic Remington	73,663	7.9%
Essex Bi-Partisan	John J. Giblin	21,688	2.3%
Essex Bi-Partisan	John F. Monica	21,072	2.2%
Essex Bi-Partisan	Sylvester L. Casta	19,015	2.0%
Essex Bi-Partisan	Joseph J. Bradley	16,348	1.7%
Essex Bi-Partisan	Richard P. Weitzman	15,733	1.7%
Unity-Victory-Progress	Joseph A. Santiago	5,483	0.6%
Total votes		937,500	100.00%
Democratic gain from Republican			

== District 12 ==
District 12 consisted of all of Hudson County.

=== Democratic primary ===
==== Candidates ====
- James P. Dugan, assemblyman from Bayonne (Regular Democratic Organization)
- Frederick H. Hauser, incumbent senator since 1968 (Faithful Democratic Senator)
- William F. Kelly Jr., incumbent senator since 1958 (Regular Democratic Organization)
- William Musto, incumbent senator since 1966 and former mayor of Union City (Regular Democratic Organization)

==== Results ====
1971 Democratic primary
Party	Candidate	Votes	%
Democratic	William Musto (incumbent)	36,617	31.02%
Democratic	William F. Kelly Jr. (incumbent)	36,344	30.79%
Democratic	James P. Dugan	33,259	28.17%
Democratic	Frederick H. Hauser (incumbent)	11,826	10.02%
Total votes		118,046	100.00%

=== Republican primary ===
==== Candidates ====
- Mario De Luca
- Richard L. Jarvis
- Nelson G. Russell

==== Results ====
1971 Republican primary
Party	Candidate	Votes	%
Republican	Nelson G. Russell	4,322	33.87%
Republican	Richard L. Jarvis	4,225	33.11%
Republican	Mario De Luca	4,215	33.03%
Total votes		12,762	100.00%

=== General election ===
==== Candidates ====
- Patrick D. Conaghan, Bayonne attorney (Save Hudson County)
- Anthony M. DeFino, mayor of West New York (Save Hudson County)
- Mario DeLuca (Republican)
- James P. Dugan, assemblyman from Bayonne (Democratic)
- Francis X. Hayes, former assistant Jersey City corporation counsel (Save Hudson County)
- William F. Kelly Jr. (Democratic)
- Richard D. McAleer (Honesty-Efficiency-Decency)
- William Musto, incumbent senator since 1966 and former mayor of Union City (Democratic)
- Cosmo Palmitessa (Republican)
- Joseph J. Panepinto (Republican)

==== Campaign ====
In the general election, an independent slate allied with Paul T. Jordan challenged the Democratic machine.

==== Results ====
1971 New Jersey Senate election
Party	Candidate	Votes	%
Democratic	William Musto (incumbent)	81,522	17.0%
Democratic	James P. Dugan	78,293	16.3%
Democratic	William F. Kelly Jr. (incumbent)	76,177	15.9%
Save Hudson County	Patrick D. Conaghan	47,082	9.8%
Save Hudson County	Francis X. Hayes	47,036	9.8%
Save Hudson County	Anthony M. Defino	44,703	9.3%
Republican	Joseph J. Panepinto	33,985	7.1%
Republican	Cosmo Palmitessa	33,131	6.9%
Republican	Mario DeLuca	32,131	6.7%
Honesty-Efficiency-Decency	Richard D. McAleer	5,496	1.1%
Total votes		479,556	100.00%
Democratic hold			

== District 13 ==
District 13 consisted of all of Bergen County.

=== Democratic primary ===
==== Candidates ====
- Sidney Aglow, Leonia resident (Democratic)
- Lee M. Carlton, Gold Star father from Harrington Park (Democratic)
- Raymond Garramone, mayor of Haworth (Democratic)
- Alfred W. Kiefer, Hasbrouck Heights attorney and perennial candidate (Democratic)
- John J. McCarthy, candidate for mayor of Old Tappan in 1969 (Democratic)

==== Results ====
1971 Democratic primary
Party	Candidate	Votes	%
Democratic	Alfred W. Kiefer	12,448	20.15%
Democratic	Sidney Aglow	12,400	20.07%
Democratic	Raymond Garramone	12,349	19.99%
Democratic	John J. McCarthy	12,336	19.97%
Democratic	Lee M. Carlton	12,240	19.81%
Total votes		61,773	100.00%

=== Republican primary ===
==== Candidates ====
- Garrett W. Hagedorn, incumbent senator since 1968 (Republicans for Sensible Government)
- Harold C. Hollenbeck, assemblyman from East Rutherford (Republicans for Sensible Government)
- James A. Quaremba, Ridgewood (Home-Rule Republican)
- James W. Ralph, Tenafly (Home-Rule Republican)
- Alfred D. Schiaffo, incumbent senator since 1968 (Republicans for Sensible Government)
- Frederick E. Wendel, mayor of Oradell (Republicans for Sensible Government)
- Joseph C. Woodcock, incumbent senator since 1968 (Republicans for Sensible Government)

===== Withdrew =====
- Willard B. Knowlton, incumbent senator since 1968 (ran as independent)

==== Results ====
1971 Republican primary
Party	Candidate	Votes	%
Republican	Garrett W. Hagedorn (incumbent)	19,808	18.54%
Republican	Frederick E. Wendel	18,559	17.37%
Republican	Harold C. Hollenbeck	18,279	17.37%
Republican	Joseph C. Woodcock (incumbent)	17,573	16.45%
Republican	Alfred D. Schiaffo (incumbent)	16,531	15.47%
Republican	James A. Quaremba	8,772	8.21%
Republican	James W. Ralph	7,326	6.86%
Total votes		106,848	100.00%

=== General election ===
==== Candidates ====
- Sidney Aglow, Leonia resident (Democratic)
- Lee M. Carlton, Gold Star father from Harrington Park (Democratic)
- Raymond Garramone, mayor of Haworth (Democratic)
- Garrett W. Hagedorn, incumbent senator since 1968 (Republican)
- Harold C. Hollenbeck, assemblyman from East Rutherford (Republican)
- Alfred W. Kiefer, Hasbrouck Heights attorney and perennial candidate (Democratic)
- Willard B. Knowlton, incumbent senator since 1968 (Nobody's Rubber Stamp)
- John J. McCarthy, candidate for mayor of Old Tappan in 1969 (Democratic)
- Alfred D. Schiaffo, incumbent senator since 1968 (Republican)
- Frederick E. Wendel, mayor of Oradell (Republican)
- Joseph C. Woodcock, incumbent senator since 1968 (Republican)

==== Results ====
1971 New Jersey Senate election
Party	Candidate	Votes	%
Republican	Harold C. Hollenbeck	158,615	11.3%
Republican	Joseph C. Woodcock Jr. (incumbent)	157,280	11.2%
Republican	Garrett W. Hagedorn (incumbent)	153,203	10.9%
Republican	Alfred D. Schiaffo (incumbent)	151,806	10.8%
Republican	Frederick E. Wendel	150,962	10.8%
Democratic	John J. McCarthy	128,109	9.1%
Democratic	Raymond Garramone	125,154	8.9%
Democratic	Alfred W. Kiefer	124,083	8.8%
Democratic	Sidney Aglow	123,857	8.8%
Democratic	Lee M. Carlton	119,262	8.5%
Nobody’s Rubber Stamp	Willard B. Knowlton	11,668	0.8%
Total votes		1,403,999	100.00%
Republican hold			

== District 14 ==
District 14 consisted of all of Passaic County.

=== Democratic primary ===
==== Candidates ====
- William J. Bate, Passaic County freeholder (Democratic)
- Joseph Hirkala, assemblyman from Passaic (Democratic)
- Joseph A. Lazzara, former Passaic County freeholder and candidate for Senate in 1967 and mayor of Paterson in 1969 (Democratic)

==== Results ====
1971 Democratic primary
Party	Candidate	Votes	%
Democratic	Joseph Hirkala	7,454	33.78%
Democratic	William J. Bate	7,366	33.38%
Democratic	Joseph A. Lazzara	7,249	32.85%
Total votes		22,069	100.00%

=== Republican primary ===
==== Candidates ====
- Thomas W. E. Bowdler, Little Falls resident (Passaic County Republican Organization)
- Walter E. Johnson, member of the Totowa board of education (Independent Republican Candidate)
- Henry Fette, Clifton car dealer (Passaic County Republican Organization)
- Alfred Fontanella, assemblyman from Paterson and nominee for U.S. House in 1970 (Passaic County Republican Organization)

==== Results ====
1971 Republican primary
Party	Candidate	Votes	%
Republican	Henry Fette	5,577	31.52%
Republican	Thomas W. E. Bowdler	5,538	31.30%
Republican	Alfred Fontanella	5,424	30.66%
Republican	Walter EPassaic County . Organization Johnson	1,153	6.52%
Total votes		17,692	100.00%

=== General election ===
==== Candidates ====
- William J. Bate, Passaic County freeholder (Democratic)
- Thomas W. E. Bowdler, Little Falls resident (Republican)
- Josephine Clement (Socialist Labor)
- Robert Clement (Socialist Labor)
- Henry Fette, Clifton car dealer (Republican)
- Alfred Fontanella, assemblyman from Paterson and nominee for U.S. House in 1970 (Republican)
- Joseph Hirkala, assemblyman from Passaic (Democratic)
- Joseph A. Lazzara, former Passaic County freeholder and candidate for Senate in 1967 and mayor of Paterson in 1969 (Democratic)

==== Results ====
1971 New Jersey Senate election
Party	Candidate	Votes	%
Democratic	Joseph Hirkala	64,725	21.2
Democratic	Joseph A. Lazzara	54,426	17.8
Democratic	William J. Bate	54,149	17.7
Republican	Alfred Fontanella	46,478	15.2
Republican	Thomas W. E. Bowdler	39,545	12.9
Republican	Henry Fette	39,406	12.9
Socialist Labor	Robert Clement	3,645	1.2
Socialist Labor	Josephine Clement	3,485	1.1
Total votes		305,859	100.0
Democratic gain from Republican			

== District 15 ==
District 15 consisted of all of Sussex and Warren counties.

=== Democratic primary ===
==== Candidates ====
- Richard V. Laddey, Sparta attorney

==== Results ====
1971 Democratic primary
Party	Candidate	Votes	%
Democratic	Richard V. Laddey	2,709	100.00%
Total votes		2,709	100.00%

=== Republican primary ===
==== Candidates ====
- Wayne Dumont, incumbent senator since 1968 and nominee for governor in 1965

==== Results ====
1971 Republican primary
Party	Candidate	Votes	%
Republican	Wayne Dumont (incumbent)	6,356	100.00%
Total votes		6,356	100.00%

=== General election ===
==== Candidates ====
- Wayne Dumont, incumbent senator since 1968 and nominee for governor in 1965 (Republican)
- Richard V. Laddey (Democratic)

==== Results ====
1971 New Jersey Senate election
Party	Candidate	Votes	%
Republican	Wayne Dumont (incumbent)	28,041	66.6%
Democratic	Richard V. Laddey	14,072	33.4%
Total votes		42,113	100.0
Republican hold			
