= J. Edward Crabiel =

American politician (1916–1992)

Member of the New Jersey Senate from the 7th district (at-large)
- In office January 11, 1966 – January 8, 1974
- Preceded by: District created
- Succeeded by: District eliminated

Senate Minority Leader
- In office January 1968 – January 1974
- Preceded by: Edwin B. Forsythe
- Succeeded by: Alfred Beadleston

Member of the New Jersey General Assembly from Middlesex County
- In office January 12, 1954 – January 11, 1966
- Preceded by: Edwin J. Snediker
- Succeeded by: Robert Wilentz

Assembly Majority Leader
- In office January 1963 – January 1964
- Preceded by: Elmer M. Matthews

Assembly Minority Leader
- In office January 1964 – January 1966

Secretary of State of New Jersey
- In office 1974–1977
- Governor: Brendan Byrne
- Preceded by: Paul J. Sherwin
- Succeeded by: Donald Lan

Personal details
- Born: Joseph Edward Crabiel; June 20, 1916 Milltown, U.S.
- Died: June 19, 1992 (aged 75) New Brunswick, U.S.
- Party: Democratic
- Spouse: Doris Young Crabiel
- Education: Rutgers University–New Brunswick

Joseph Edward Crabiel (June 20, 1916 – June 19, 1992) was an American Democratic Party politician who served in the New Jersey Legislature and as New Jersey Secretary of State until a scandal ended his political career. Known as "Steady Eddie," and later as "Concrete Eddie," he was briefly a candidate for the 1973 Democratic nomination for Governor of New Jersey.

== Early life, education and military service ==
Born on June 20, 1916, in Milltown, New Jersey, he was the son of Milltown Councilman Joseph M. Crabiel and Helen Glock Crabiel. A brother, David Crabiel, was a longtime member of the Middlesex County Board of Freeholders and twice a candidate for Congress. Crabiel attended Milltown public schools, graduated from New Brunswick High School, and in 1936 received a BS in civil engineering from Rutgers University. In 1936, he joined the Franklin Construction Company as a civil engineer; he later served as president of Great Notch Granule Company and as president of F.E. Schroeder, Inc. He served in the U.S. Navy during World War II, where, as a member of the 70th Naval Construction Battalion attached to the Amphibious Corps, he was part of the Battle of Okinawa. He continued to serve in the U.S. Naval Reserves until his retirement in 1953. He was married for 52 years to Doris Young Crabiel; they had a daughter and three grandchildren.

== Political career ==
Crabiel was elected Mayor of Milltown in 1947, at age 31. He was re-elected in 1949. He was an alternate delegate to the 1948 Democratic National Convention, pledged to Harry S. Truman.

He was elected to the New Jersey General Assembly representing Middlesex County in 1953, and was re-elected in 1955, 1957, 1959, 1961 and 1963. During his twelve year as an Assemblyman, he served as Assistant Majority Leader (1962), Majority Leader (1963), and Minority Leader (1964 and 1965).

In 1965, after the U.S. Supreme Court, in Reynolds v. Sims (more commonly known as One Man, One Vote), required redistricting by state legislatures for congressional districts to keep represented populations equal, as well as requiring both houses of state legislatures to have districts drawn that contained roughly equal populations, and to perform redistricting when needed. Because of its population, Middlesex County gained a second Senate seat.

Crabiel was elected to the state senate in 1965, running on an at-large ticket with incumbent John A. Lynch Sr. in the new 7th Legislative District. They defeated Republicans Albert Ichel and Edward Hellriegel by a margin of nearly 3-1. Redistricting for the 1967 election gave Middlesex a third Senate seat. Running with Lynch and Assemblyman Norman Tanzman, he was re-elected in an election cycle that was less favorable toward Democrats (it was the mid-term election of the second term of Governor Richard J. Hughes), Crabiel won by a margin of sightly less than 8,000 votes over the top Republican vote-getter, Milltown GOP Chairman John A. Bradley. In his 1971 re-election campaign for a third term, Crabiel won by an impressive 31,000 vote margin. Crabiel served as the Senate Minority Leader from 1968 to 1973.

== Campaign for Governor of New Jersey ==
On December 13, 1972, Crabiel announced that he would be a candidate for the 1973 Democratic nomination for Governor of New Jersey, seeking to challenge the Republican incumbent, William T. Cahill. Five weeks after Democratic presidential candidate George McGovern's landslide defeat, Crabiel cast himself as an organization centrist, saying in his announcement: "I'm an organization man from way back. I represent the center of my party, and in the recent presidential election the majority of the people overwhelmingly indicated that they want to move back to the center." He became the second Democrat to enter the race, following former Assemblyman Vito Albanese (D-Bergen), who supported the legalization of marijuana and advocated an end to New Jersey's prohibition of abortion. Joining the race later were State Senator Ralph DeRose (D-Essex), former State Senator Richard J. Coffee (D-Mercer), former Senate Majority Leader John A. Waddington (D-Salem), and Assemblywoman Ann Klein (D-Morris). Another Democrat, Assemblyman Charles Yates (D-Burlington) also considered a gubernatorial bid.

Less than two weeks after Crabiel's announcement, a plan to unite the 21 Democratic County Chairmen behind a single challenger to Cahill appeared to backfire as "reform-minded liberals"—many of whom became active in Democratic politics by supporting Eugene McCarthy and Robert F. Kennedy in 1968 and McGovern in 1972—attacked the move as "bossism" and called for the resignation of Democratic State Chairman Salvatore Bontempo. The move was supposed to solidify support behind DeRose, a conservative Democrat closely allied with the powerful Essex County Democratic Chairman, Harry Lerner.

With liberals intent on nominating a gubernatorial candidate who was not a pawn of Democratic party bosses, by the end of January 1973 there was talk that Superior Court Judge Brendan Byrne was being asked to run.

In March, Coffee attacked Crabiel, saying his nomination would be "disaster for the Democratic party in the November elections." He cited "lucrative" state highway contracts to Crabiel's construction company, and Crabiel's refusal to release his personal financial information.

On April 25, Byrne announced that he would run for governor, launching what was viewed as an eleventh hour campaign. He quickly picked up the backing of the powerful Hudson County Democratic Organization. On April 26, Coffee withdrew from the race and endorsed Byrne, and led to increased pressure for Crabiel to also drop out and help clear the field for Byrne. Byrne quickly won endorsements from Democratic organizations in Bergen and Mercer counties.

On May 2, Crabiel dropped out and endorsed Byrne. That led to two county organizations that had been with Crabiel, Middlesex and Passaic, to back Byrne. Crabiel complained that it was too late for him to seek a fourth term in the state senate; his hand-picked successor, Edison Mayor Bernard J. Dwyer, was already in the race and the filing deadline had passed.

== Secretary of State ==
On December 5, 1973, Governor-elect Byrne announced that he had picked Crabiel to serve in his cabinet as New Jersey Secretary of State. His nomination was confirmed by the state senate, and he took office in January, 1974.

== Indictment ==
Just one month after taking office as secretary of state, law enforcement officials disclosed that Crabiel was "the principal target of a state grand jury investigation of corruption in New Jersey highway construction involving alleged collusive bidding and kickbacks to local politicians." Crabiel immediately held a news conference professing his innocence, but he quickly became a political liability to Byrne. Byrne soon asked Crabiel to resign, but Crabiel told him to keep his suggestions to himself. Crabiel was essentially frozen out of the Byrne Administration. He was later indicted on charges that he conspired to control highway construction contracts. A judge eventually dismissed the charges because the statute of limitations had run out. Byrne eventually allowed Crabiel back into his circle of advisors. Crabiel resigned in July 1977—just after staying long enough to qualify for his full state pension—while Byrne was seeking re-election and running well behind the Republican nominee, Raymond Bateman.

Former New Jersey Secretary of State Lloyd B. Marsh, who served under two Republican Governors, was named as an unindicted co-conspirator the Crabiel indictment—three years after Marsh had died.

== Highway Commissioner ==
Two weeks after Byrne was re-elected, he announced Crabiel's nomination as a Commissioner of the New Jersey Turnpike Authority. In 1986, Governor Thomas Kean appointed him to serve on the New Jersey Wastewater Treatment Trust.

== Retirement and death ==
After leaving office, Crabiel and his wife lived in Boca Raton, Florida. Crabiel died on June 19, 1992, at St. Peter's Medical Center in New Brunswick, where he had been admitted two weeks earlier after complaining of muscle disease. He was 75. The cause of death was acute respiratory failure. He died the day before his 76th birthday.

Political offices
Preceded by Robert M. Falcey	Secretary of State of New Jersey; 1974–1977	Succeeded by Francis J. Carragher (acting)
