= 1977 New Jersey gubernatorial election =

- November 8, 1977
- Turnout: 59% of eligible voters (▼2.4 pp)
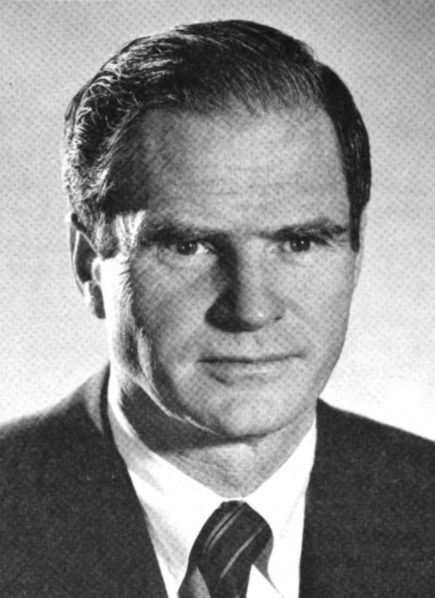

Nominee	Brendan Byrne	Raymond Bateman
Party	Democratic	Republican
Popular vote	1,184,564	888,880
Percentage	55.71%	41.81%
- Byrne: 40–50% 50–60% 60–70% 70–80% Bateman: 50–60%
Governor before election
Brendan Byrne
Democratic
Elected Governor
Brendan Byrne
Democratic

The 1977 New Jersey gubernatorial election was held on November 8, 1977. Incumbent Democratic governor Brendan Byrne defeated Republican State Senator Raymond Bateman with 55.71% of the vote.

Primary elections were held on June 7. Byrne barely overcame a large field of challengers, unusual for an incumbent governor, to win the Democratic nomination with just over thirty percent of the vote. In the Republican primary, Bateman defeated Thomas Kean by a roughly 66,500 vote majority with former senator C. Robert Sarcone a distant third.

Byrne, whose popularity had plummeted after his landslide 1973 victory and his introduction of the state's first income tax, faced an uphill battle even after surviving the primary. Bateman led in all early polls, usually by a large margin. However, Byrne waged an aggressive campaign, challenging Bateman to several debates and criticizing both his voting record and his comprehensive economic proposals. In doing so, he ate into Bateman's margin in the polls, softened the unpopularity of the income tax, and flipped his own image as a weak incumbent; by November, he was considered the favorite for re-election, and he won handily.

To date, this was the last time the counties of Hunterdon and Warren were carried by a Democratic gubernatorial candidate. This was also the last time New Jersey would re-elect a Democratic governor until Phil Murphy was elected in 2021. As of 2023, this is also the most recent New Jersey gubernatorial election in which both major party candidates have since died.

== Background ==
Governor Brendan Byrne was elected in 1973 with 66.7% of the vote, the largest victory in the state's history. His landslide margin, which was credited to his image as a corruption-proof judge in the immediate wake of the Watergate scandal, swept Democratic supermajorities into both houses of the New Jersey Legislature.

During the 1973 campaign, Byrne commented that he saw no need for a state income tax "for the foreseeable future". Nevertheless, he began to push for an income tax within his first months in office to provide funding for a court-ordered refinancing of New Jersey's public schools. His popularity soon plummeted. After a two-year fight, Byrne's income tax passed in 1976. However, it was set to expire in June 1978, setting up his re-election as a referendum on the tax. During the height of the anti-tax fervor, critics began to call the governor "One-Term Byrne."

In 1976, New Jersey was a battleground state in the presidential campaign. Incumbent Republican president Gerald Ford attacked Byrne by name and made veiled references to the income tax during his visits to the state. When Democratic nominee Jimmy Carter and his wife Rosalynn visited the state to campaign, they were jeered by anti-tax demonstrators. At one campaign stop in Newark, Byrne was booed for ten minutes upon his arrival. Though Byrne was one of the earliest supporters of Carter during the primary, the new president avoided the Governor for nearly a year after. Though Ford ultimately lost the national election, Byrne's unpopularity was partially credited for Ford's victory in New Jersey.

== Democratic primary ==
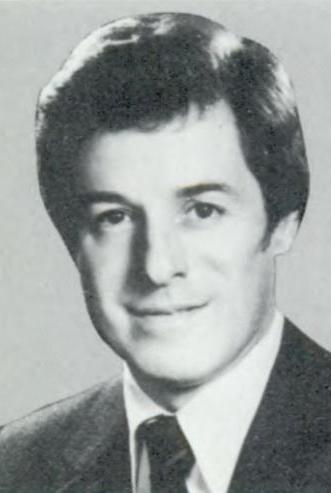
Florio

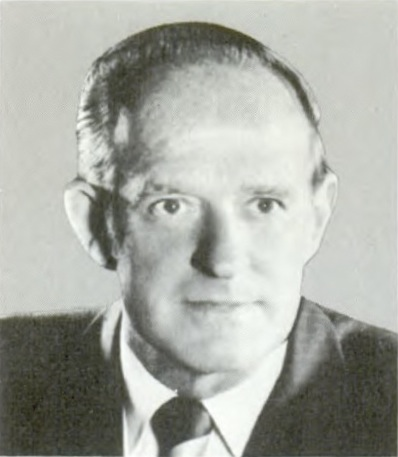
Roe

Two of the stronger challengers to Governor Byrne were U.S. Representatives Jim Florio and Bob Roe. Roe finished second and Florio fourth. They would face off again in the 1981 primary, in which Florio defeated Roe and several other candidates.

=== Candidates (with ballot slogans) ===
- Brendan Byrne, incumbent Governor (Democrats for Byrne)
- Ralph DeRose, former State Senator from Essex County and candidate for governor in 1973 (This Time, Make the Right Choice)
- James Florio, U.S. Representative from Cherry Hill (Regular Democratic Organization)
- A. Howard Freund, American Party nominee for governor in 1973 (Democrats Against State Income Tax)
- Raymond Garramone, state senator from Haworth (Experienced Democrats for Better Government)
- Joseph A. Hoffman, former Commissioner of Labor and Industry (He Can Make New Jersey Work)
- George Koukos (Demand Immediate Repeal of Income Tax)
- Robert A. Roe, U.S. Representative from Wayne (Regular Democratic Party)
- Melvin M. Whaley (Democrat for Change)
- Emery J. Zold (Government For the People: Stop Bossism)

==== Withdrew ====
- Paul T. Jordan, Mayor of Jersey City (withdrew following municipal elections)
- Jeffrey Ketterman, former Dean of Seton Hall Law School and aide to Governor Byrne

Byrne's unpopularity, which was particularly strong in blue-collar Democratic areas where opposition to the tax was strongest, prompted a large field of challengers. Early on, there were proposals to remove the incumbent from the race entirely by securing him a federal appointment from President Carter, but these proposals were squashed after Senate President Matthew Feldman, who would have succeeded Byrne, pleaded guilty to commercial bribery.

The first major candidate to enter the race was U.S. Representative Robert A. Roe on February 21. Roe ran as an explicit opponent of the income tax, calling for a state convention to propose at least two alternatives. Roe criticized the general business climate in the state, which he said had resulted in an "absolute decline in manufacturing jobs" and "an endangered capital base".

Another U.S. Representative who stood as a strong challenger was James Florio, a second-term South Jersey who announced his intent to run in January. Before entering the race, Florio publicly claimed he had assurances that the South Jersey counties would back him as a bloc, giving him the leverage necessary to solicit northern support. He formally announced his campaign in March. Despite his earlier opposition to the Byrne plan as a state legislator, Florio surprised observers by claiming there was no need for dramatic reform to the state tax system. He said that it would be difficult to retain the property tax relief and homestead rebate provisions of the Byrne plan without an income tax, and that "there are no glib answers to complex problems like this".

Former senator Ralph DeRose entered as a strictly anti-tax candidate, hoping to win on the back of Essex and Hudson counties alone. Joseph A. Hoffman, who had been ousted from Byrne's cabinet as State Commissioner of Labor and Industry the year prior, filled out the main field of challengers.

Raymond Garramone, a state senator and former mayor of upper-middle class Haworth, announced a "people's campaign" on March 1. He ran as a supporter of the Byrne tax plan and fervent opponent of any effort to extend or raise the sales tax. As the lone candidate from Bergen County, Garramone hoped re-unite the divided Bergen County Democratic organization, which had been unable to settle on any of the candidates already in the race.

Governor Byrne himself only entered the race in late April, prompting the anti-Byrne field to largely focus on his low chances for re-election as a detriment to the party. He admitted that he had nearly decided not to run in January.

=== Campaign ===
The primary campaign focused on two major issues: Byrne's personal qualities, especially his decision to back the income tax, and the state of the New Jersey economy.

Early on, the possibility that Byrne might not run at all encouraged his primary opponents, who attacked his "lack of leadership". In the alternative he did run, they argued he "could only lead the Democratic candidates for the Legislature to a one-sided disaster."

A collateral issue in the early campaign was the proposal to route the supersonic airliner Concorde through Newark Liberty Airport. Jersey City mayor Paul T. Jordan opposed the Concorde, claiming it was "a symbol of technology and embodies everything we are presently concerned about in terms of energy consumption and air pollution". However, Jordan sought the endorsement of Newark mayor Kenneth A. Gibson, who wanted the Port Authority to approve test landings. Gibson ultimately backed Byrne for re-nomination, and Jordan dropped out of the race after losing control of the Jersey City party in the mayoral election. The issue faded thereafter.

Byrne's campaign was led by Richard C. Leone, Richard J. Coffee, and David Garth. Byrne ran television ads admitting that his 1973 comments were a mistake; the campaign said that voters responded positively.

In June, six leading candidates (Byrne, Roe, Florio, Garramone, Joseph A. Hoffman and Ralph DeRose) met with reporters and editors of The New York Times in a roundtable discussion. Byrne conceded that the race was a referendum on the income tax and argued his defeat would lead to a 5-percent increase in the sales tax or a statewide property tax.

DeRose, who Byrne considered his strongest challenger, faced accusations that he was a machine candidate" due to his endorsements from the Essex County chair Harry Lerner and Jersey City mayor-elect Thomas F. X. Smith. "Every other candidate sought Harry Lerner's endorsement, some of them more than once," he said. "I met once with Tommy Smith in a diner when he was looking for an anti-tax candidate to support. I got his support and gave him mine because we agreed on the issues." He denied giving even "five cents" to Smith's campaign.

Hoffman said that DeRose's plan to abandon the tax in favor of a state tax on 50 percent of the value of new industrial ratables was not feasible, because it would drive down the willingness to host new industry given concerns with pollution and traffic. Florio emphasized his support for President Carter and contrasted Carter's leadership style with Byrne's. Both Florio and Roe cited their experience in Congress and the need to work with national government to solve New Jersey's economic problems. Garramone emphasized that he was from Bergen County, a Republican stronghold at the time.

As the campaign came to a close, it became apparent that Byrne could survive.

=== Results ===
Byrne: 30–40%; 40–50%; 50–60%; Roe: 40–50%; 80–90%; DeRose: 50–60%; Florio: 30–40%; 40–50%; 70–80%; Hoffman: 30–40%

Democratic primary results
Party	Candidate	Votes	%
Democratic	Brendan Byrne (incumbent)	175,448	30.30
Democratic	Robert A. Roe	134,116	23.16
Democratic	Ralph DeRose	99,948	17.26
Democratic	James Florio	87,743	15.15
Democratic	Joseph A. Hoffman	58,835	10.16
Democratic	Raymond Garramone	6,602	1.14
Democratic	A. Howard Freund	6,205	1.07
Democratic	Paul T. Jordan (withdrew)	2,996	0.52
Democratic	Emery J. Zold	2,934	0.51
Democratic	George Koukos	2,889	0.50
Democratic	Melvin M. Whaley	1,282	0.22
Total votes		578,998	100.00

Byrne survived the June primary, though with such a small plurality that his victory was blamed primarily on the regionally fractured opposition. Roe was the only challenger to pull votes from throughout the state; the others were largely confined to regional bases: DeRose in Essex and Hudson, Florio in Camden and the surrounding counties, and Hoffman in Middlesex and Monmouth.

At a victory celebration, Byrne said he "fought like hell for this nomination. ... Reports of my death were exaggerated." He framed his victory as a triumph over the county party machines and an affirmation of his efforts against corruption. Exit polling indicated that Byrne won the votes of those who supported the tax or its modification rather than outright repeal, who were a majority of the party.

Nevertheless, more than two-thirds of his party had voted against his nomination, including a majority of those who said they had voted for him in 1973. With no such prospects for the fall, he faced a difficult path to re-election.

== Republican primary ==
=== Candidates (with ballot slogans) ===
- Raymond Bateman, State Senator from Somerville (Regular Republican Party Organization)
- Thomas Kean, State Assemblyman from Livingston (Regular Republican Party)
- C. Robert Sarcone, former state senator from Essex County (Republican (No State Income Tax))
- William A. Angus Jr., former mayor of Moorestown (Abolish Tax No T-E Conservative Government)

==== Withdrew ====
- Joseph C. Woodcock, former state senator and Bergen County prosecutor (endorsed Kean)

==== Declined ====
- Frank X. McDermott, state senator from Westfield (endorsed Kean)
- James Wallwork, state senator from Short Hills

=== Campaign ===
During the Republican primary, Senator Ray Bateman, who had supported income-tax proposals in the past as part of a proposed overhaul of the state tax code but was an adamant opponent of the Byrne plan, promised not to renew the tax and to run the state for four years without the tax if necessary. Both leading candidates were considered moderates.

Bateman was the early favorite; Kean tried to play catch-up by sidelining two strong potential opponents, State Senators Frank X. McDermott, who joined the Kean campaign as chairman, and James Wallwork, who backed out of the race after difficulty fundraising. McDermott's support gave Kean strong backing in Union County, and Wallwork's decision not to run boosted his strength in Essex County. He then hoped to consolidate neighboring Morris County behind him to take on Bateman.

Bateman ran a campaign with establishment party support, including the endorsement of former governor William T. Cahill. Kean countered this by a direct appeal to the rank-and-file voters through television advertisements.

By primary day, the race was widely rated as a toss-up.

=== Polling ===
Poll source	Date(s) administered	Sample size	Margin of error	Raymond Bateman	Tom Kean	Others	Undecided
Market Opinion Research (Note: This poll was commissioned by the Kean campaign.)	Jan. 29–Feb. 13, 1977	410 RV		15%	23%	–	62%
Market Opinion Research	April 19–26, 1977	400 RV	±5.0%	21%	42%	1%	36%

=== Results ===
Bateman: 40–50%; 50–60%; 60–70%; 70–80%; 80–90%; Kean: 40–50%

Republican Party primary results
Party	Candidate	Votes	%
Republican	Raymond Bateman	196,592	54.70
Republican	Thomas Kean	129,982	36.17
Republican	C. Robert Sarcone	20,861	5.80
Republican	William A. Angus Jr.	11,954	3.33
Total votes		359,389	100.00

The margin of victory was a surprise, including to Bateman, who remarked to supporters, "I was the world's worst guesser. I thought Tom Kean would have run a lot closer."

== General election ==
=== Candidates ===
- Raymond Bateman, state senator from Somerville (Republican)
- Brendan Byrne, incumbent governor (Democratic)
- Francis W. Flowers (Declare Your Independence)
- Bill Gahres, Barnegat electrician and ditchdigger (Right to Die)
- Robert Ganteaume (Grass Roots)
- Jasper C. Gould (independent)
- Chester Grabowski (Independents for All)
- Leif O. Johnson (Labor)
- Jules Levin, nominee for President of the United States in 1976 (Socialist Labor)
- Angelo S. Massaro (People's Choice)
- Richard D. McAleer, Hoboken teacher (Anti-Income Tax)
- Chauncey E. McSpiritt (Cheap, Chauncey, Upstart)
- Frank J. Primich (Libertarian)
- Paul B. Rizzo (independent)
- William Zsidisin (One For All)

==== Withdrew ====
- John F. Donato, Newark urologist and anti-tax activist (Axe The Tax) (withdrew November 3 and remained on ballot; endorsed Bateman)
- Anthony Imperiale, state senator from Newark (Independent) (withdrew September 19; endorsed Bateman)

=== Campaign ===
Bateman was a strong favorite early in the campaign, given his own strong primary showing and Byrne's unpopularity among voters. Early public opinion polling gave Bateman a ten to twelve point lead.

Byrne immediately went on the offensive following the primary, challenging Bateman to a series of debates and attacking his voting record and lack of clear alternative to the income tax. He stood by the tax, pressing Bateman to reveal how he would replace $900 million in state revenue. Without the revenue, Byrne claimed the state would have to reinstate certain business taxes and decrease state education aid, property tax exemptions for the elderly and veterans, and homestead rebates.

Bateman ran a low-key campaign for much of the summer, relying his personal image as "the very model of congeniality and affability", in self-evident contrast with Byrne's image as hard-nosed and icy.

In late September, Bateman unveiled a 11-point economic program, which called for a selective freeze on state hiring, a series of budget transfers, a tightening of welfare payments and, if necessary, an increase of one cent on the dollar in the 5 percent state sales tax. Bateman said he would seek to replace only $650 million of the income tax revenue and would scrap the homestead rebates, which he called a "revolving-door gimmick". The plan was developed by a team that included former U.S. Treasury Secretary William E. Simon. Newspaper editorials denounced the plan as unworkable, and Byrne upped his attacks, calling the plan "dishonest" and a "phony". As summer turned to fall, polling narrowed rapidly.

Bateman stumbled at times by his excessive forthrightness: when a Philadelphia Inquirer editor asked if he could rule out re-imposing the income tax in a hypothetical second term, he refused. At one of the debates, he conceded there would be "tremendous problems" if his plan failed to revive the state economy. As the campaign wore on, Bateman's supposedly greatest strength—his friendly disposition—was turned into a weakness as he refused to respond to Byrne's attacks and became seen as ineffectual. "Toughness is not my style," Bateman admitted.

In October, Bateman attempted to make a late issue of Byrne's nomination of Joseph P. Lordi, a former Essex prosecutor, as head regulator of the new Casino Control Commission. Lordi's law firm once represented a company with ties to organized crime, and Lordi himself was a frequent customer at a restaurant with a mob-connected owner. Byrne knew these facts but did not pass the information on to the Senate Judiciary Committee, which had confirmed Lordi's nomination. Bateman called the handling of the nomination "indefensible" and "typical". In attacking Byrne's supposed immunity to corruption, Bateman hoped to revive his flagging campaign. However, the attack likely backfired, creating backlash among the state's large ethnic Italian community, many of whom resented the criticism of Byrne as a specious attack on Lordi.

Both Jimmy Carter and Gerald Ford campaigned in the states for their respective parties. Both this race and the Virginia gubernatorial election were seen as the earliest tests of the Carter administration's political strength and the potential for a Gerald Ford comeback in 1980. On a campaign stop in Whippany, Ford mistakenly introduced Bateman as "the next governor of the State of Michigan."

=== Debates ===
The candidates participated in nine debates and two joint appearances, which became increasingly personally acrimonious. Byrne called Bateman a "liar" and "hypocrite", prompting Bateman to describe the governor as a "playboy" and "dilettante" toward the end of the campaign.

In their September 12 debate in Paramus, Byrne proposed the decriminalization of marijuana, while Bateman opposed it.

=== Endorsements ===
Declined to endorse
- New Jersey AFL-CIO

=== Polling ===
Poll source	Date(s) administered	Sample size	Brendan Byrne (D)	Raymond Bateman (R)	Anthony Imperiale (I)	Others	Undecided
Rutgers/Eagleton	July 18–29, 1977	1004 A	37%	47%	—	1%	15%
Rutgers/Eagleton	July 18–29, 1977	1004 A	35%	41%	11%	1%	11%
Rutgers/Eagleton	September 20–27, 1977	844 RV	39%	46%	—	1%	13%
Rutgers/Eagleton	September 20–27, 1977	844 RV	38%	42%	8%	0%	12%
New York Times/WCBS-TV	October 15–19, 1977	1,416 RV	40%	40%	—	—	20%
New York Times/WCBS-TV	October 15–19, 1977	? LV	43%	43%	—	—	14%
Rutgers/Eagleton	Oct. 24–Nov. 1, 1977	1,027 RV	44%	36%	—	2%	18%
Rutgers/Eagleton	Oct. 24–Nov. 1, 1977	? LV	50%	40%	—	1%	9%

Ocean and Monmouth counties

Poll source	Date(s) administered	Sample size	Brendan Byrne (D)	Raymond Bateman (R)	Others/Undecided
Asbury Park Press	May 1, 1977		30%	40%	30%
Asbury Park Press	September 15, 1977		24%	39%	37%
Asbury Park Press	October 10, 1977		28%	43%	29%
Asbury Park Press	November 6, 1977	402 A	37%	35%	28%

=== Results ===
New Jersey gubernatorial election, 1977
Party	Candidate	Votes	%	±%
Democratic	Brendan Byrne (incumbent)	1,184,564	55.71%	▼10.96
Republican	Raymond Bateman	888,880	41.81%	▲9.96
Independent	Francis W. Flowers	8,677	0.41%	N/A
Independent	Chester Grabowski	8,494	0.40%	N/A
Libertarian	Frank J. Primich	5,674	0.27%	▲0.12
Independent	Chauncey E. McSpiritt	4,464	0.21%	N/A
Independent	Paul B. Rizzo	3,691	0.17%	N/A
Independent	Richard D. McAleer	3,688	0.17%	N/A
Independent	John F. Donato (withdrawn)	3,189	0.15%	N/A
Independent	Angelo S. Massaro	3,031	0.14%	▲0.05
Independent	William Zsidisin	2,974	0.14%	N/A
Socialist Labor	Julius Levin	2,276	0.11%	▼0.09
Independent	Jasper C. Gould	2,248	0.11%	N/A
Independent	Leif O. Johnson	1,601	0.08%	N/A
Independent	Robert Ganteaume	1,480	%	N/A
Independent	Bill Gahres	1,333	%	N/A
Majority		295,684	13.90	
Turnout		2,126,264		
Democratic hold		Swing		

==== Results by county ====
County	Byrne votes	Byrne %	Bateman votes	Bateman %	Other votes	Other %
Atlantic	36,790	58.0%	25,020	39.4%	1,652	2.6%
Bergen	153,434	56.9%	111,858	41.5%	4,359	1.6%
Burlington	55,991	62.6%	31,378	35.1%	2,143	2.4%
Camden	87,334	65.8%	40,608	30.6%	4,725	3.6%
Cape May	15,814	53.5%	13,307	45.0%	432	1.5%
Cumberland	16,741	51.2%	14,980	45.8%	980	3.1%
Essex	120,576	58.0%	83,409	40.1%	3,853	1.9%
Gloucester	33,433	59.3%	20,532	36.4%	2,446	4.4%
Hudson	89,181	62.4%	49,160	34.4%	4,550	3.2%
Hunterdon	12,608	49.9%	12,168	48.1%	507	2.0%
Mercer	65,371	65.3%	32,994	32.9%	1,810	1.8%
Middlesex	104,687	57.4%	72,477	39.7%	5,324	2.9%
Monmouth	81,155	55.5%	62,031	42.4%	3,042	2.1%
Morris	55,033	44.6%	66,288	53.7%	2,160	1.7%
Ocean	59,307	55.1%	45,513	42.3%	2,843	2.7%
Passaic	49,223	44.8%	57,545	52.3%	3,193	2.9%
Salem	9,961	52.8%	8,359	44.3%	545	2.9%
Somerset	29,286	41.3%	40,164	56.7%	1,421	2.0%
Sussex	13,431	46.3%	14,575	50.3%	975	3.4%
Union	82,130	49.7%	77,695	47.1%	5,273	3.2%
Warren	13,078	58.1%	8,819	39.2%	607	2.6%

==== Counties that flipped from Democratic to Republican ====
- Morris
- Passaic
- Somerset
- Sussex

==== Counties that flipped from Republican to Democratic ====
- Cape May

== Analysis ==
On election night, the state was hit with a heavy storm. Byrne's helicopter was forced to make an emergency landing at an elementary school en route to his campaign event in West Orange. The Byrne campaign appealed to state Supreme Court Chief Justice Morris Pashman to keep polls open past 8 p.m., but their request was rejected. When all the votes came in it was clear that Byrne had won re-election in a landslide. Taking 56% of the vote to Bateman's 42%, Bateman flipped 4 Counties that Byrne carried in 1973 (Sussex, Passaic, Morris, and Somerset), meanwhile, Byrne flipped Cape May County which he had lost decisively in 1973 and was the only county he did not win in that election.

Despite the personal acrimony, both candidates were magnanimous in the aftermath of the results. Bateman conceded early on election night and telegraphed Byrne to wish him "a productive second term". Byrne said in his victory speech that Bateman waged a "fine campaign" and "has the respect of the people of New Jersey and deserves that respect."

In the immediate aftermath, observers in both parties agreed that Bateman's economic plan had turned Byrne's greatest political weakness into a strength. Byrne himself said the results showed "there is no reason to be afraid of an income tax and a lot of reasons to be afraid of bad alternatives". Bergen County Republican chair Anthony Statile directly blamed the "Bateman-Simon plan" as the chief cause of the result and predicted just after polls closed that Byrne would carry the county by 35,000 votes. Byrne ran far ahead of predictions in blue-collar Democratic areas, where opposition to the tax had been strongest.
