= 1973 New Jersey gubernatorial election =

- November 6, 1973
- Turnout: 61.4% of eligible voters (▼12.8 pp)
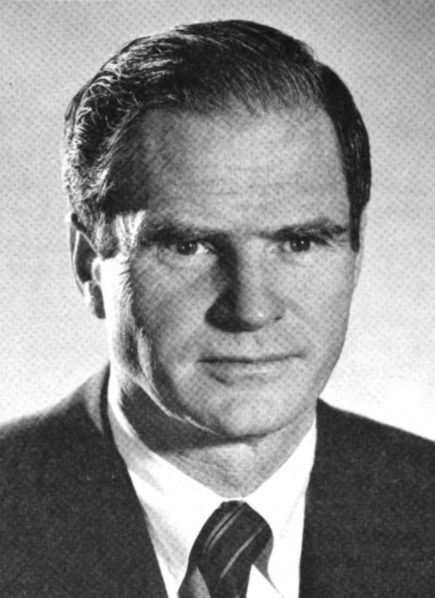

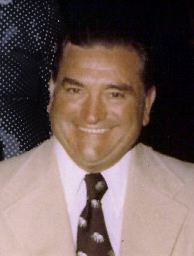
Nominee	Brendan Byrne	Charles W. Sandman Jr.
Party	Democratic	Republican
Popular vote	1,414,613	676,235
Percentage	66.67%	31.87%
- Byrne: 50–60% 60–70% 70–80% Sandman: 60–70%
Governor before election
William T. Cahill
Republican
Elected Governor
Brendan Byrne
Democratic

The 1973 New Jersey gubernatorial election was held on November 6, 1973. Incumbent Governor William T. Cahill ran for reelection, but was defeated in the Republican primary by Charles W. Sandman Jr. In the general election, Democratic nominee Brendan Byrne defeated Sandman with 66.67% of the vote.

Primary elections were held on June 5. Sandman defeated Governor Cahill, whose reputation had been damaged by a series of corruption scandals, in a rematch of the 1969 Republican primary; his victory "shocked party leaders throughout the state." Byrne, a judge and former prosecutor who had a reputation for resistance to corruption, defeated Ann Klein and Ralph DeRose to win the Democratic nomination.

Byrne carried 20 of New Jersey's 21 counties, with Sandman only winning his native Cape May. To date, this remains the largest margin of victory and share of the vote for the Democratic Party in a gubernatorial election. This is the only gubernatorial election in which the Democratic nominee won Morris County between 1931 and 2025, as well as the only time since 1937 that Sussex County did so. This election was also the last time the incumbent New Jersey governor was defeated in the primary. Byrne held the record for most votes ever to be received by a single candidate in a New Jersey gubernatorial election until both Mikie Sherrill and Jack Ciattarelli surpassed his record in 2025.

== Background ==
In 1969, William T. Cahill defeated Charles W. Sandman Jr. in the Republican primary, with the winner almost assured of victory. The close race between the liberal Cahill and the conservative Sandman created a lasting rift between the two men personally and politically; he easily defeated former governor Robert B. Meyner in the general election.

Cahill was popular through most of his first two years in office, during which he quieted a rebellion at Rahway State Prison without violence and convinced the New York Giants to relocate to the New Jersey Meadowlands. He also signed into law new environmental protection and consumer protection regulations. He developed a national reputation as one of the most successful Republican Governors in the country. His popularity suffered a slight setback, particularly among conservatives, when he signed an increase in the state sales tax and proposed a further institution of the state's first income tax. He put the income tax issue directly to the voters in a July 1972 referendum but was defeated. Nevertheless, he remained popular enough among the party's liberal wing that some suggested Cahill should replace Spiro Agnew as Richard Nixon's running mate in 1972.

However, Cahill's administration began a precipitous decline in 1972, when Secretary of State Paul J. Sherwin, a long-time aide to Cahill from his days in Washington, was indicted, convicted and sentenced to one to three years in prison for rigging a $600,000 state highway contract in a scheme that kicked back $10,000 to Cahill's closest donors. The issue was compounded by the fact that charges were only brought after 18 months of delay, when U.S. Attorney Herbert J. Stern compelled state Attorney General George F. Kugler to prosecute. Though the State Commission of Investigation released a lengthy report criticizing Stern and exonerating Kugler, legislators in both parties considered the commission's ability to be subjective compromised, and Democratic leaders called the report a "whitewash."

The growing corruption scandal in the Cahill administration became more salient with New Jersey voters as a similar political corruption scandal played out on the national level: the break-in at the Watergate Hotel.

== Republican primary ==
=== Candidates ===
- William T. Cahill, incumbent Governor of New Jersey
- Michael A. Maglio, Essex County Republican Committeeman
- Charles W. Sandman Jr., U.S. Representative from Lower Township

==== Declined ====
- Frederick B. Lacey, Judge and former U.S. Attorney of the United States District Court for the District of New Jersey

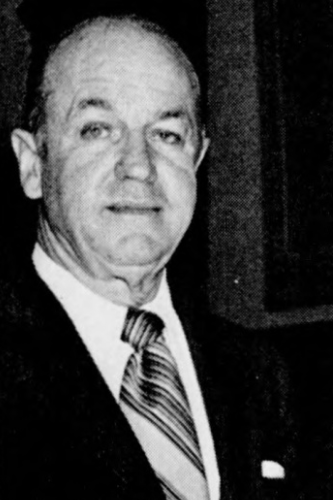
Incumbent Governor William T. Cahill's popularity began to decline after federal charges were brought in connection with his 1969 campaign.

Charles Sandman remained a critic of Governor Cahill throughout his term in office, such that the two were known as the party's "most outspoken political enemies." By fall 1972, Sandman was publicly criticizing Cahill by name in earnest.

On February 17, after months of failing to recruit another Republican challenger, Sandman formally announced he would challenge Cahill's renomination at a secretive meeting of Republican leaders in Trenton. He said he was running to give "better leadership to both the state and Republican Party" and called for an open primary without county organization endorsements. It was his third announced campaign for Governor, after losing the primary in 1965 and 1969.

=== Campaign ===
Before Cahill even entered the race, Sandman charged that renominating him would destroy the New Jersey Republican Party and ensure that Democrats won both houses of the Legislature. "According to the Democrats, Cahill's re-election campaign will make The Perils of Pauline seem like a situation comedy," he said. Some Republicans interpreted Sandman's projection that Cahill was doomed in the general election as an invitation for a conservative third party to bolt the Republican ticket, in the event Cahill was renominated.

==== Ideological contest ====
Sandman also challenged Cahill on ideological grounds, criticizing Cahill's first-term record and presenting himself as a conduit for conservative reaction. He said he would campaign on education, transportation, and the increasing burden of crime and taxes. He also opposed Cahill's efforts to mandate school integration via busing and challenge restrictive zoning laws.

Sandman's strategy was predicated on the belief in an emerging conservative majority in the state, which Sandman adviser F. Clifton White attributed to Richard Nixon's landslide re-election in the state. Cahill contested this view, maintaining that New Jersey was still a liberal state and that "to be against is not enough."

==== Gross and McCrane scandals ====
Sandman made an early issue of the Sherwin scandal, predicting that if he did not criticize and defeat Cahill, the Democratic Party would make a major issue of corruption in the fall. Cahill did not shy from the issue of corruption, demanding in March that the entire election should constitute a public referendum on the question of his personal honesty. In his campaign announcement, he referred to himself in the third person, "If the public believes that there is any corruption in Bill Cahill or anybody associated with Bill Cahill, then they shouldn't vote for Bill Cahill."

In April, the cloud of corruption around Cahill grew larger. Two high-ranking members of his 1969 campaign, state party chairman Nelson G. Gross and New Jersey Treasurer Joseph McCrane, were accused of illegally masking contributions to the campaign as tax deductions. (Both were later indicted and convicted.) McCrane was also indicted for bribery and misconduct in office in an alleged conspiracy to have several large banks and the State Division of Investment, which was under his control, purchase millions of securities through his brother, a Manhattan securities broker. Though Cahill was never personally implicated in the scandals, he had personally pledged to "search out" political corruption during the 1969 campaign and in his inaugural address, and his reputation suffered greatly.

=== Endorsements ===
Cahill retained the endorsements of nearly every Republican legislator and the editorial support of New Jersey's leading newspapers, though he lost the support of liberal U.S. Senator Clifford Case, who had backed him twice before.

=== Results ===
Republican primary results by county Sandman: 50–60%; 60–70%; 70–80%; 80–90%; Cahill: 40–50%; 50–60%

Republican Party primary results
Party	Candidate	Votes	%
Republican	Charles W. Sandman Jr.	209,657	57.51
Republican	William T. Cahill (incumbent)	148,034	40.61
Republican	Michael A. Maglio	6,881	1.89
Total votes		364,572	100.00

On election night, Sandman defeated Cahill easily. Cahill wished Sandman "sincere congratulations," but declined to make any pledge of support. "I stand before you with my head high tonight. I came in fighting and I went out fighting," he said to supporters. "I look back with a feeling that all I did and all that those around me did was the best of our ability. We tried to contribute something to New Jersey."

In his victory speech, Sandman claimed a "mandate" for conservatism. He renewed his campaign offer to nominate Brendan Byrne, now his general election opponent, as a special prosecutor against political corruption, saying there was "no better person for that office."

Sandman's victory, which came despite the entire state establishment remaining loyal to Cahill, "shocked party leaders throughout the state." His victory was compared to Barry Goldwater's 1964 nomination for President. Liberal Republicans projected Sandman would meet the same fate: landslide defeat. One aide to Governor Cahill remarked, "The Republicans are like lemmings marching into the sea. They are determined to commit political suicide."

== Democratic primary ==
=== Candidates ===
- Vito Albanese, former state assemblyman from Fort Lee
- Brendan Byrne, Essex County Superior Court judge and former county prosecutor
- Ralph DeRose, state senator from South Orange
- Frank Forst, union leader and mayor of Jamesburg
- Ann Klein, state assemblywoman from Morristown

==== Withdrew ====
- Richard J. Coffee, state senator from Lawrence (endorsed Byrne)
- J. Edward Crabiel, state senator from Milltown (endorsed Byrne)

==== Declined ====
- Henry Helstoski, U.S. representative from East Rutherford and candidate for governor in 1969
- John A. Waddington, former state senator from Salem
- Charles B. Yates, assemblyman from Edgewater Park

Initially, Cahill's chances for re-election looked so strong, and his popularity among Democrats and liberal-minded independents was so strong, that a number of potential Democratic candidates could not be persuaded to run. However, with the Gross and McCrane scandals breaking three weeks before the April 26 filing deadline, Byrne decided at the eleventh hour to enter the campaign with the support of the Hudson County political machine. His entry instigated the withdrawal of state senator Richard J. Coffee, who endorsed Byrne. State senator J. Edward Crabiel came under similar pressure to stand aside for Byrne. He was initially resistant but soon withdrew and endorsed Byrne as well.

=== Campaign ===
During the campaign, Byrne hammered hard on the issue of corruption, relying on his reputation as "the man who couldn't be bought" by organized crime. Support from Richard J. Coffee brought many influential supporters, including Richard C. Leone, who became Byrne's campaign manager.

Byrne's alliance with the Hudson County party organization, typically seen as a political machine and often a hub of corruption, posed an issue for him early in the campaign. Byrne publicly opposed use of the county line, the system of county party endorsements which often proved decisive in the primary, but he said that given DeRose was running on the Essex County line, he would maintain the "standoff" and remain on the Hudson County line.

=== Results ===
Democratic primary results by county Byrne: 30–40%; 40–50%; 50–60%; 60–70%; Klein: 40–50%; 60–70%; DeRose: 40–50%

Democratic primary results
Party	Candidate	Votes	%
Democratic	Brendan Byrne	193,120	45.31
Democratic	Ann Klein	116,705	27.38
Democratic	Ralph DeRose	95,085	22.31
Democratic	Frank Forst	15,815	3.71
Democratic	Vito Albanese	5,460	1.28
Total votes		426,185	100.00

At his victory celebration in East Orange, Byrne said the voters had showed "the people have held the Governor accountable" for surrounding himself with corrupt aides. Klein conceded but claimed her candidacy had struck a blow for women's liberation. "We have expanded the horizon of every little girl in the United States," she said.

== General election ==
=== Candidates ===
- Jack D. Alvino (Independent)
- Brendan Byrne, Superior Court judge and former Essex County Prosecutor (Democratic)
- Robert Clement (Socialist Labor)
- Alfred V. Colabella (Independent)
- A. Howard Freund (American)
- George Gilk (Defeat Narcotics Crime)
- John A. Goodson (Libertarian)
- Stanley R. Knis (Tax Repeal)
- Angelo S. Massaro (People's Choice)
- Kenneth F. Newcombe (Communist)
- Charles W. Sandman Jr., U.S. representative from Lower Township (Republican)
- James J. Terlizzi, Sr. (Independent Taxpayer's Watchdog)

=== Results ===
New Jersey gubernatorial election, 1973
Party	Candidate	Votes	%	±%
Democratic	Brendan Byrne	1,414,613	66.67%	▲28.18
Republican	Charles W. Sandman Jr.	676,235	31.87%	▼27.79
American Independent	A. Howard Freund	6,412	0.31%	N/A
Independent	Alfred V. Colabella	5,088	0.24%	N/A
Socialist Labor	Robert Clement	4,249	0.20%	▼0.06
Libertarian	John A. Goodson	3,071	0.15%	N/A
Independent	James J. Terlizzi, Sr.	2,670	0.13%	N/A
Independent	Stanley R. Knis	2,108	0.10%	N/A
Communist	Kenneth F. Newcombe	2,008	0.10%	N/A
Independent	Angelo S. Massaro	1,898	0.09%	N/A
Independent	Jack D. Alvino	1,843	0.09%	▼0.35
Independent	George Gilk	1,814	0.09%	N/A
Majority		738,378	34.80	
Turnout		2,122,009		
Democratic gain from Republican		Swing		

==== Results by county ====
County	Byrne votes	Byrne %	Sandman votes	Sandman %	Other votes	Other %
Atlantic	30,513	51.1%	27,547	46.2%	1,611	2.6%
Bergen	196,661	63.9%	106,904	34.8%	4,021	1.3%
Burlington	52,273	68.2%	23,319	30.4%	1,084	1.4%
Camden	85,091	70.2%	34,630	28.6%	1,551	1.4%
Cape May	10,261	35.8%	18,227	63.6%	185	0.7%
Cumberland	18,884	54.7%	15,515	45.0%	102	0.3%
Essex	162,989	69.2%	68,223	29.0%	4,211	1.8%
Gloucester	34,097	64.9%	18,149	34.6%	279	0.5%
Hudson	124,558	74.7%	39,827	23.9%	2,285	1.5%
Hunterdon	15,058	68.5%	6,680	30.4%	258	1.2%
Mercer	71,527	76.3%	20,859	22.3%	1,314	1.4%
Middlesex	125,871	72.3%	44,844	25.8%	3,267	1.8%
Monmouth	92,749	69.2%	39,345	29.3%	2,028	1.5%
Morris	72,539	63.3%	40,524	35.4%	1,495	1.3%
Ocean	53,688	61.4%	32,502	37.2%	1,240	1.4%
Passaic	71,673	60.4%	44,844	37.8%	2,102	1.8%
Salem	10,935	56.4%	8,397	43.3%	47	0.2%
Somerset	39,864	64.5%	20,933	33.9%	1,024	1.6%
Sussex	15,866	62.1%	9,502	37.2%	195	0.7%
Union	113,678	68.3%	50,010	30.0%	2,759	1.6%
Warren	15,838	74.2%	5,414	25.4%	104	0.5%

Counties that flipped from Republican to Democratic

- Atlantic
- Bergen
- Burlington
- Camden
- Cumberland
- Essex
- Gloucester
- Hudson
- Hunterdon
- Mercer
- Middlesex
- Monmouth
- Morris
- Ocean
- Passaic
- Salem
- Somerset
- Sussex
- Union
