= Jerome Epstein =

Jerome Epstein may refer to:

- Jerome Epstein (politician) (1937–2025), American politician
- Jerome Epstein (director) (1922–1991), American director, screenwriter and producer
