= General Menard =

General Menard or Ménard may refer to:

- André Ménard (1907–1988), French general
- Daniel Ménard (fl. 2000s–2010s), Canadian Forces brigadier general
- Dollard Ménard (1913–1997), Canadian Army brigadier general
- Wilfred C. Menard Jr. (1918–2012), U.S. Army major general
