= Jerome Epstein (politician) =

American politician (1937–2025)

Jerome M. Epstein (March 15, 1937 – August 11, 2025) was an American politician who served in the New Jersey Senate as a Republican from 1972 to 1974 and later went to federal prison for pirating millions of dollars' worth of fuel oil.

== Life and career ==
Born in New Brunswick, Epstein attended the Wardlaw-Hartridge School and graduated from Rutgers University in 1958. He served in the U.S. Marine Corps. He was an executive with his family's fuel oil and gasoline distribution company. He was the Chairman of the Union County Health Board, and was a Legislative Aide to State Senator Nelson Stamler.

A resident of Scotch Plains, Epstein was elected to the Union County Board of Chosen Freeholders in 1967 and served one term. In 1971, he was elected to the State Senate. He ran with two incumbent GOP Senators, Matthew John Rinaldo and Frank X. McDermott for the open seat of Nicholas LaCorte (R-Union), who had resigned to become a Judge. Epstein defeated Carmine J. Liotta of Elizabeth, an attorney for the New Jersey Office of Consumer Protection, by just 400 votes, 68,531 to 68,131.

In 1972, Epstein wanted Leslie Glick, an ex-Assistant Union County Prosecutor, to get a Superior Court Judgeship, but Governor William Cahill instead nominated Stephen Bercik, a former Mayor of Elizabeth. Epstein escalated his feud with Cahill by using Senatorial Courtesy to block the reappointment of former New York Stock Exchange Chairman James C. Kellogg III as the Commissioner of the Port Authority of New York and New Jersey.

Feuds with Cahill and with local Republican leaders in Union County caused Epstein to lose party support in his bid for re-election to a second term in 1973. He lost the Republican primary to Assemblyman Peter McDonough, 7,214 (60.37%) to 4,735 (39.63%).

In 1977, Epstein was sentenced to nine years in a federal prison after his conviction on charges that he pirated $4 million worth of fuel oil from tanks belonging to Exxon, systematically rigging gauges on a rental oil barge over several years to take 4,000 barrels of oil but pay for only 2,000.

Epstein died on August 11, 2025, at the age of 88.

New Jersey Senate
Preceded by Jerry Fitzgerald English	Member of the New Jersey Senate from the 9th district 1972–1974; Served alongside: Matthew J. Rinaldo, Frank X. McDermott, William J. McCloud	Succeeded by Constituency abolished
