= Stephen Bercik =

American mayor

Stephen Joseph Bercik (1921–2003) served as mayor of Elizabeth, New Jersey, between 1956 and 1964. While mayor, his achievements included the modernization of the city charter, establishment of the Elizabeth Human Relations Committee, helping to develop Elizabeth seaport as a major shipping center, and meadowlands developments.

As an appointee of Governor Richard Hughes, he served on The Waterfront Commission of New York Harbor from 1966 to 1971. Following his terms as the Commissioner for New Jersey, in 1972 he was given a judicial appointment in Union County, New Jersey by William T. Cahill. He served as a judge in the Juvenile and Domestic Relations division of the Superior Court of Union County. He served as Presiding Judge from 1977 until he retired in 1988. A street in Elizabeth was named in Stephen Bercik's honor some time after his time as Judge
