= Matthew G. Carter =

American pastor and politician (1913–2012)

Mayor of Montclair, New Jersey
- In office 1968–1972
- Preceded by: Harold Hayes
- Succeeded by: n/a

Personal details
- Born: October 16, 1913 Danville, Virginia
- Died: March 14, 2012 (aged 98)
- Spouse: Frances Hill Carter

Matthew G. Carter (October 16, 1913 – March 14, 2012) was an American pastor and politician who served as the Mayor of Montclair, New Jersey from 1968 to 1972, becoming the first African American to serve as Mayor of Montclair. Carter also served as the chairman of the New Jersey State Commission on Civil Rights.

== Biography ==
Carter was born in Danville, Virginia, on October 16, 1913, to Clarence and Henrietta Carter. He became the pastor of the Zion Baptist Church, located in Petersburg, Virginia. Carter received a bachelor's degree from the Virginia Union University in 1939, before completing his Master of Divinity from Virginia Union University's School of Theology in 1942. Carter later completed additional graduate studies at Columbia University and the Union Theological Seminary in New York City.

Carter entered local politics in Montclair, New Jersey in 1964, winning election to the Montclair Town Commission. He ran on the Montclair Community Committee slate and was the top vote-getter with 6,694 votes. Four of the five candidates on Carter's ticket won. He served as both the Commissioner of Public Works and the Vice Mayor of Montclair from 1964 to 1968. Carter also held a seat on the Montclair Township Commission. He was re-elected to the Township Commission in 1968, defeating eleven other candidates in the election.

In 1971, Carter sought the Republican nomination for New Jersey State Senator, running At-Large in Essex County. His running mates were three incumbent Senators, Michael Giuliano, James Wallwork, and Milton Waldor, as well as North Caldwell Republican Chairman Frederic Remington. Carter received 19,011 votes in the Republican primary, significantly more than his closest rival for the nomination, Donald Blasi of Newark, who received 3,557 votes. Carter lost the general election, finishing 8th in a field of 16 candidates for 5 seats. Giuliano and Wallwork won, along with Democrats Ralph DeRose of South Orange, Frank Dodd of West Orange, and Wynona Lipman of Montclair, the first African American woman to serve in the New Jersey Senate. Carter received 77,418 votes. Lipman, who came in fifth, received 85,644 votes.

Carter was elected Mayor of Montclair by his colleagues on the Commission in 1968, the same year as his re-election. He served until 1972. Carter was a strong advocate of the expansion of affordable housing during his tenure. His advocacy and professional work in the field continued after leaving office. He established a Fair Housing local ordinance for Montclair, which stipulated that housing decisions should not be based on national origin or race. In 1979, Carter oversaw the opening of the Erie Lackawanna Apartments, a low income housing complex spearheaded by local residents and the Union Baptist Church. The 126-unit apartment complex was subsidized with funding from the United States Department of Housing and Urban Development. In 1999, the apartments were remained the Matthew G. Carter Apartments to honor Carter for his contributions.

Carter was appointed as the chairman of the New Jersey State Commission on Civil Rights, a statewide body. He went on to serve on the boards of many other organizations as well. Professionally, Carter also held positions as the assistant director of the YMCA publishing house, based in New York City, and the Department of Community Affairs of Hoffmann-La Roche.

Matthew Carter died of complications of Alzheimer's disease on March 14, 2012, at the age of 98. He was survived by his wife, Frances Hill Carter; two daughters, Bettye Carter Freeman and Nanette Carter; and three granddaughters. His daughter, Bettye Freeman, who was formerly a Massachusetts assistant attorney general for civil rights, is a dean of students at Northeastern University School of Law, and married to artist, Robert T. Freeman.

== See also ==
- List of first African-American mayors
