= Vito Albanese =

American politician (died 1988)

Vito A. Albanese (died April 13, 1998) was an American Democratic Party politician who served in the New Jersey General Assembly from 1966 to 1968 and unsuccessfully sought the Democratic nomination for governor in 1973. He spent 25 years as a labor leader, serving as president of the Pulp, Sulphite and Paper Mill Workers Union.

== Political career ==
A resident of Fort Lee, Albanese was elected to the State Assembly in the 1965 Democratic landslide, running at-large in Bergen County. He was the top vote-getter in the race for seven Assembly seats; he defeated, among others, Republican Assemblyman David Gelber.

As an Assemblyman, Albanese and Ned J. Parsekian introduced legislation in June 1966 that would eliminate the Borough of Teterboro, which had 22 residents and a very large industrial tax base, and divide it up into four adjacent municipalities. Albanese created a controversy when he alleged that Bergen County Prosecutor John J. Breslin and officials of the Bergen County Chamber of Commerce offered him a bribe to withdraw his proposed legislation. A special legislative committee formed to investigate Albanese's accusations said that Albanese's claim that he was offered a bribe was "wholly without support or corroboration" and accused him of McCarthyism. Albanese said the committee was putting "a coat of white paint on a pile of manure." He was an early advocate of a State Income Tax. In 1967, Albanese was defeated in his bid for re-election to a second term. Running in the newly created Bergen County District 6B, he and his running mate, Assemblyman Arnold E. Brown, were defeated by Republicans Thomas Costa and Austin Volk. Albanese ran fourth, losing by nearly 11,000 votes.

In 1969, Albanese ran again for the State Assembly, this time without the support of the Bergen County Democratic Organization. He lost the primary to Ernest Allen Cohen and Martin T. Durkin by more than 5,000 votes.

Albanese sought the Democratic nomination for governor in 1973, supporting the legalization of marijuana and advocated an end to New Jersey's prohibition of abortion.

During the campaign, he complained that the media was more interested in writing about his ownership of several bars in Bergen County and in New York City that were "frequented by homosexuals" than they were in covering his proposals. He finished fifth in the Democratic primary that was won by Brendan Byrne; Albanese won just 5,460 statewide (1.28%).

In 1974, Albanese testified at the federal campaign fraud trial of his onetime rival, former Republican state chairman Nelson G. Gross, a former Bergen County GOP chairman, state senator, assemblyman, and 1970 Republican U.S. Senate nominee. The New York Times said that Albanese's "value as a witness appeared to be nullified under cross-examination."

== Family ==
Albanese grew up in Palisades Park before moving to Fort Lee. His brothers were politically active in Palisades Park including Vincent, a Republican, and Mario, the Democratic Committee Chair.

== Death ==
Albanese died on April 13, 1998, in Fort Lee, New Jersey.
