= Ralph DeRose =

American politician

Ralph C. DeRose

Member of the New Jersey Senate from the 11th District (at-large)
- In office January 11, 1972 – January 8, 1974
- Preceded by: Multi-member district
- Succeeded by: District abolished

Personal details
- Born: Ralph C. DeRose; September 7, 1928 Newark, New Jersey, U.S.
- Died: December 21, 2011 (aged 83) Secaucus, New Jersey, U.S.
- Party: Democratic

Ralph C. DeRose (September 7, 1928 – December 21, 2011) was an American Democratic Party official who served in the New Jersey Senate and twice sought the Democratic nomination for Governor of New Jersey. DeRose was elected to the state senate in 1971. He was a candidate for the Democratic nomination for governor in 1973, finishing third with 95,085 votes (22%), behind Brendan Byrne with 193,120 votes (45%) and Ann Klein with 116,705 (27%). Byrne later appointed him to serve as a Commissioner of the Waterfront Commission of New York and New Jersey. In 1975, Byrne tried to remove DeRose from the post, and cut DeRose's $30,500 salary. DeRose resigned in 1977 to challenge Byrne in the Democratic gubernatorial primary; he finished third with 99,948 votes (17%). Byrne won with 175,448 (30%), and U.S. Rep. Robert Roe finished second with 134,116 (23%). U.S. Rep. James Florio finished fourth with 87,743 votes (15%), followed by ex-State Labor Commissioner Joseph Hoffman with 58,835 (10%) and State Sen. Raymond Garramone with 6,602 (1%).
