= Brendan Byrne =

American politician (1924–2018)

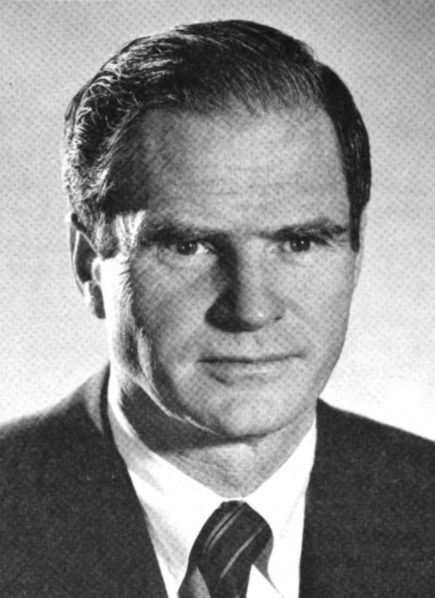
- Byrne, c. 1974

47th Governor of New Jersey
- In office January 15, 1974 – January 19, 1982
- Preceded by: William Cahill
- Succeeded by: Thomas Kean

Prosecutor of Essex County
- In office February 16, 1959 – January 11, 1968
- Appointed by: Robert B. Meyner
- Preceded by: Charles Webb
- Succeeded by: Joseph P. Lordi

Personal details
- Born: Brendan Byrne; April 1, 1924 West Orange, New Jersey, U.S.
- Died: January 4, 2018 (aged 93) Livingston, New Jersey, U.S.
- Party: Democratic
- Spouses: Jean Featherly (m. 1953; div. 1993) Ruthi Zinn (m. 1994)
- Children: 7; including Barbara
- Education: Princeton University (BA); Harvard University (LLB)

Military service
- Allegiance: United States
- Branch/service: United States Army
- Years of service: 1943–1945
- Rank: First Lieutenant
- Unit: United States Army Air Forces; 414th Bombardment Squadron, 97th Bombardment Group
- Awards: Distinguished Flying Cross; Air Medal (4)

Brendan Thomas Byrne (April 1, 1924 – January 4, 2018) was an American attorney and Democratic Party politician who served as the 47th Governor of New Jersey from 1974 to 1982.

Byrne began his career as a private attorney in Newark and East Orange. In 1959, Governor Robert B. Meyner appointed Byrne to serve as Essex County Prosecutor; he served in that role until 1968. In the late 1960s, an FBI wiretap recorded local mobsters calling Byrne "the man who couldn't be bought" in reference to his high ethical standards. The publication of the comment propelled Byrne to popularity in an era when corruption was a major concern in state and national politics. He left his office as prosecutor to serve as President of the New Jersey Board of Public Utilities from 1968 to 1970, then as a Superior Court judge.

In 1973, using "the man who couldn't be bought" as a campaign slogan, Byrne ran for governor of New Jersey. He won the Democratic primary with support from the powerful Hudson County political machine and carried the general election. His landslide victory, until then the largest in the state's history, was seen as a reaction against a bribery scandal in state government and the Watergate scandal.

During his first term, Byrne signed the state's first income tax, which broke a campaign promise and was initially highly unpopular across party lines. In 1977, he faced several prominent challengers for the party nomination but won the Democratic primary with a small plurality of the vote. Despite expectations he would lose the general election to Raymond Bateman, Byrne came from behind to win a second term.

During his time as governor, Byrne oversaw the opening of the first gambling casinos in Atlantic City and established the New Jersey Department of the Public Advocate. He also preserved a large majority of woodlands and wildlife areas in the state by restricting development.

== Early life and education ==
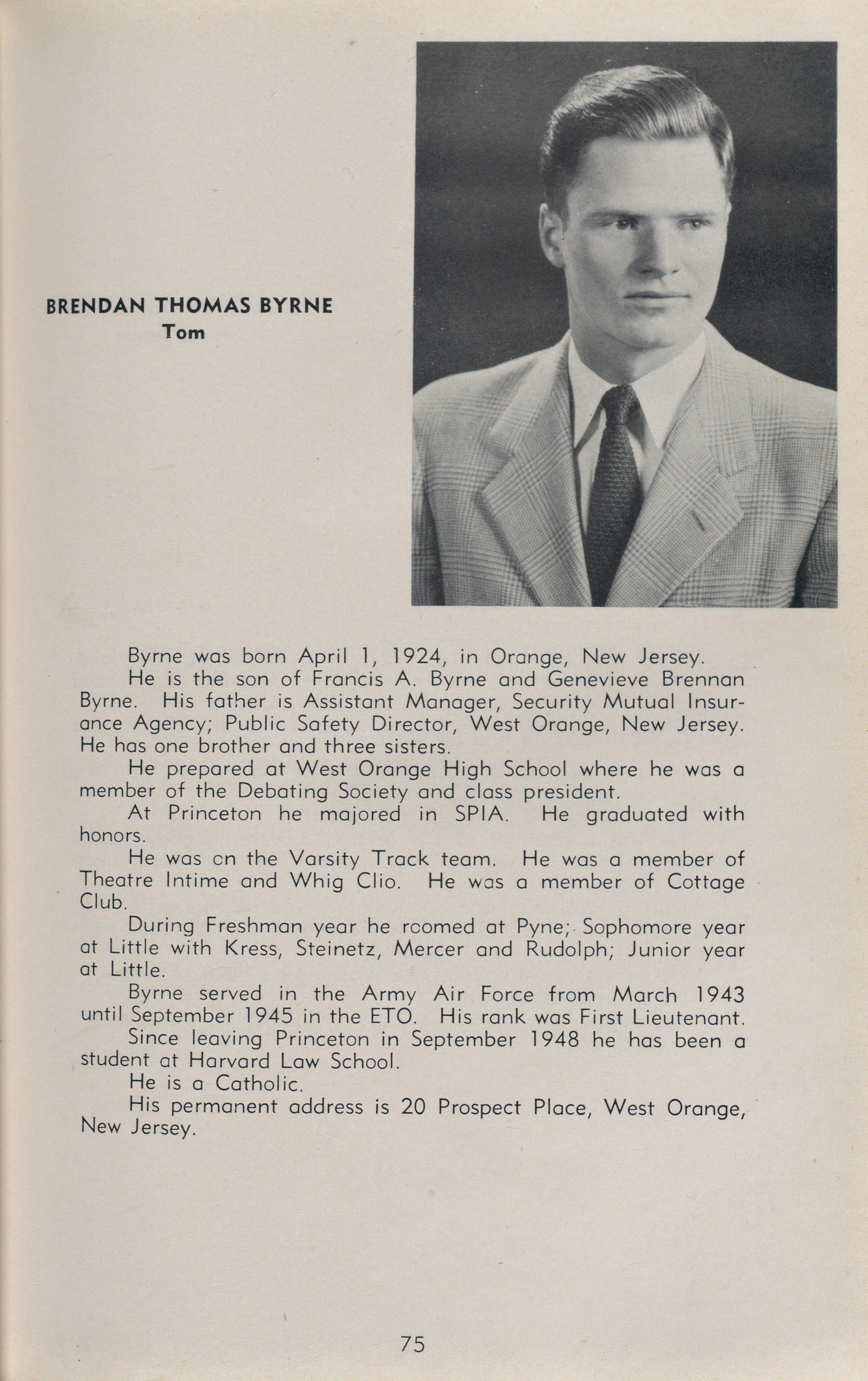
Byrne in the Princeton University yearbook, 1949

Byrne was born and raised in West Orange, New Jersey. He was the fourth child among five of Irish American Catholic parents Francis A. Byrne (1886–1974), a local public safety commissioner, and Genevieve Brennan Byrne (1888–1969).

In 1942, Byrne graduated from West Orange High School in West Orange, New Jersey, where he was president of the debate club and senior class president. He briefly enrolled at Seton Hall University, but left the university in March of the following year to join the U.S. Army. During World War II, Byrne served in the U.S. Army Air Forces as a navigator on a B-17, and was awarded the Distinguished Flying Cross and four Air Medals. By the time of his discharge from active service in 1945, he had achieved the rank of lieutenant.

After the end of World War II, Byrne attended Princeton University for two years, where he studied at the university's School of Public and International Affairs. Due to World War II, he spent only two years on campus, finishing his undergraduate thesis while enrolled at Harvard Law School. He graduated from Princeton University's School of Public and International Affairs in 1949 after completing a 95-page long senior thesis titled, "Proportional Representation in Municipal Government". He then attended Harvard Law School, where he graduated with his LL.B. in 1951.

== Career ==
=== Private attorney ===
Byrne then worked as a private attorney, first for the Newark-based law firm of John W. McGeehan, Jr., and later for the East Orange firm of Teltser and Greenberg.

=== New Jersey state government ===
In October 1955, Byrne was appointed an assistant counsel to Governor Robert B. Meyner. The following year, he became the governor's acting executive secretary. In 1958, Byrne was appointed the deputy attorney general responsible for the Essex County Prosecutor's Office. The following year, Governor Meyner appointed him as the Essex County prosecutor. Governor Hughes reappointed Byrne to this same office in 1964 following the end of his first five-year term. From 1968 to 1970, Byrne served as the president of the Board of Public Utilities Commissioners.

=== New Jersey Superior Court ===
In 1970, Byrne was appointed by Governor William T. Cahill to the Superior Court. He served as the assignment judge for Morris, Sussex, and Warren counties starting in 1972.

=== Governor of New Jersey (1974–1982) ===
==== 1973 election ====
In April 1973, Byrne resigned from the Superior Court to run for governor.

Byrne defeated Ann Klein and Ralph DeRose in the 1973 Democratic primary to win the party's nomination for governor. In the November general election, Byrne won by beating the Republican nominee Congressman Charles Sandman in a landslide. Sandman had defeated the incumbent Governor Cahill in the primary. Byrne's landslide margin of victory was so vast that it allowed Democrats to capture control both chambers of the state legislature with supermajorities.

==== First term ====
On January 15, 1974, Byrne was sworn in as the 47th governor of New Jersey.

Some of the policies enacted by the first Byrne administration include: the implementation of New Jersey's first state income tax, the establishment of spending limits on local governments, county governments, school districts, and the state, the establishment of both the Department of the Public Advocate and the Department of Energy, and the implementation of public financing for future gubernatorial general elections. Although Byrne claimed during the 1973 campaign that a personal income tax would not be necessary for "the foreseeable future", he eventually "muscled through" the unpopular income tax, New Jersey's first, in 1976; it earned him the nickname "One-Term Byrne".

==== 1977 election ====
Byrne faced ten opponents in the 1977 Democratic primary, including future governor James Florio. However, Byrne obtained the party's nomination, and went on to defeat his Republican opponent, State Senator Raymond Bateman, in the general election on November 8, 1977. This despite the fact that in early 1977, three-quarters of voters disapproved of his job performance and in polls taken in the summer, he trailed Bateman by 17 points.

Byrne and Bateman debated nine times and Byrne used the governorship to his advantage, signing bills and appearing with cabinet members all over the state, benefiting from a visit by President Carter and turning what was his biggest weakness, the income tax, into a strength. Shortly before the 1977 gubernatorial election, New Jersey homeowners began receiving rebate checks (funded by state income tax revenues) to offset their property taxes, while Bateman's plan—replacing the state income tax with an increased sales tax—was widely criticized.

Until 2021, Byrne was the last Democrat to win re-election as Governor in New Jersey.

==== Second term ====
During his second term, Byrne focused on policies such as: the passage of the Pinelands Protection Act, expansion of major highways, including the Atlantic City Expressway and Interstate 287, upgrades to sewage systems, further development of the Meadowlands Sports Complex, and casino-hotel development in Atlantic City. He is one of only two Democrats, also including incumbent Phil Murphy, to be elected governor twice in the past fifty years. The other governors elected to two terms (Thomas Kean, Christie Whitman, and Chris Christie) have all been Republicans.

=== Cabinet and administration ===
The Byrne Cabinet
Office	Name	Term
Governor	Brendan Byrne	January 15, 1974 – January 19, 1982
Secretary of Agriculture	Phillip Alampi	July 2, 1956 – June 30, 1982
Attorney General	William F. Hyland	January 15, 1974 – January 17, 1978
John J. Degnan	January 17, 1978 – March 5, 1981
Judith J. A Yaskin	March 5, 1981 – March 26, 1981 (acting)
James R. Zazzali	March 26, 1981 – January 19, 1982
Commissioner of Banking	Richard F. Schaub	February 26, 1973 – August 31, 1976
Robert F. Wagner	September 1976 – May 1977
Mary L. Parell	May 2, 1977 – February 22, 1978
Robert R. Bianchi	February 24, 1978 – February 8, 1982
President of the Civil Service Commission	James A. Alloway	June 8, 1970 – September 23, 1976
S. Howard Woodson	September 23, 1976 – March 23, 1982
Commissioner of Community Affairs	Sidney L. Willis	1974 (acting)
Patricia Q. Sheehan	January 17, 1974 – December 1, 1978
Joseph A. LeFante	December 15, 1978 – February 10, 1982
Commissioner of Corrections	Robert Mulcahy	November 8, 1976 – January 17, 1978
William H. Fauver	June 15, 1978 – December 31, 1997 (Acting: January 18, 1974 – June 15, 1978)
Defense Adjutant General	Major General William R. Sharp	April 23, 1970 – March 20, 1974
Major General Wilfred C. Menard Jr.	March 20, 1974 – February 10, 1982
Commissioner of Education	Fred G. Burke	July 1, 1974 – March 31, 1982
Commissioner of Energy	Anthony J. Grossi, President (PUC)	1972 – 1975
Joel R. Jacobson, President (PUC)	1975 – July 20, 1977
Joel R. Jacobson, Commissioner (DOE)	July 21, 1977 – December 22, 1981
Charles A Richman	1981 – 1982 (acting)
Commissioner of Environmental Protection	Richard J Sullivan	May 5, 1970 – May 6, 1974
Joseph T. Barber	1974 (acting)
David J. Bardin	May 9, 1974 – May 6, 1977
Rocco D. Ricci	July 10, 1977 – May 12, 1978 (Acting: 1977)
Betty Wilson	1978 (acting)
Daniel Joseph O'Hern	May 12, 1978 – July 16, 1979
Betty Wilson	1979 (acting)
Jerry F. English	August 23, 1979-March 1, 1982
Commissioner of Health	James R. Cowan	January 29, 1970 – May 13, 1974
Joanne E. Finley	June 17, 1974 – March 5, 1982
Chancellor of Higher Education	Ralph A. Dungan	June 26, 1967 – August 9, 1977
T. Edward Hollinder	August 9, 1977 – June 30, 1990
Commissioner of Human Services	Ann Klein, DIA	1974 – October 31, 1976
Ann Klein, DHS	November 1, 1976 – February 5, 1981
Timothy Carden	March 17, 1981 – February 25, 1982
Commissioner of Insurance	Richard C. McDonough	February 14, 1972 – January 21, 1974
James J. Sheeran	January 21, 1974 – January 25, 1982
Commissioner of Labor and Workforce; Development	Joseph A. Hoffman	1974 – 1976
John J. Horn	1976 – 1982
Public Advocate	Stanley Van Ness	May 21, 1974 – February 11, 1982
Secretary of State	J. Edward Crabiel	January 15, 1974 – July 11, 1977
F. Joseph Carragher	1974 (acting)
George W. Lee	1977 (acting)
Donald Lan	July 11, 1977 – January 19, 1982
Commissioner of Transportation	Alan Sagner	January 21, 1974 – August 15, 1977
Russell Mullen	August 15, 1977 – May 22, 1978
Louis Gambaccini	May 22, 1978 – September 25, 1981
Anne Canby	November 16, 1981 – April 16, 1982 (Acting: August 13, 1981 – November 16, 1981)
State Treasurer	Richard Leone	January 15, 1974 – December 10, 1976
Clifford A. Goldman	February 18, 1977 – January 19, 1982 (Acting: 1976 – 1977)

== Law practice and columnist ==
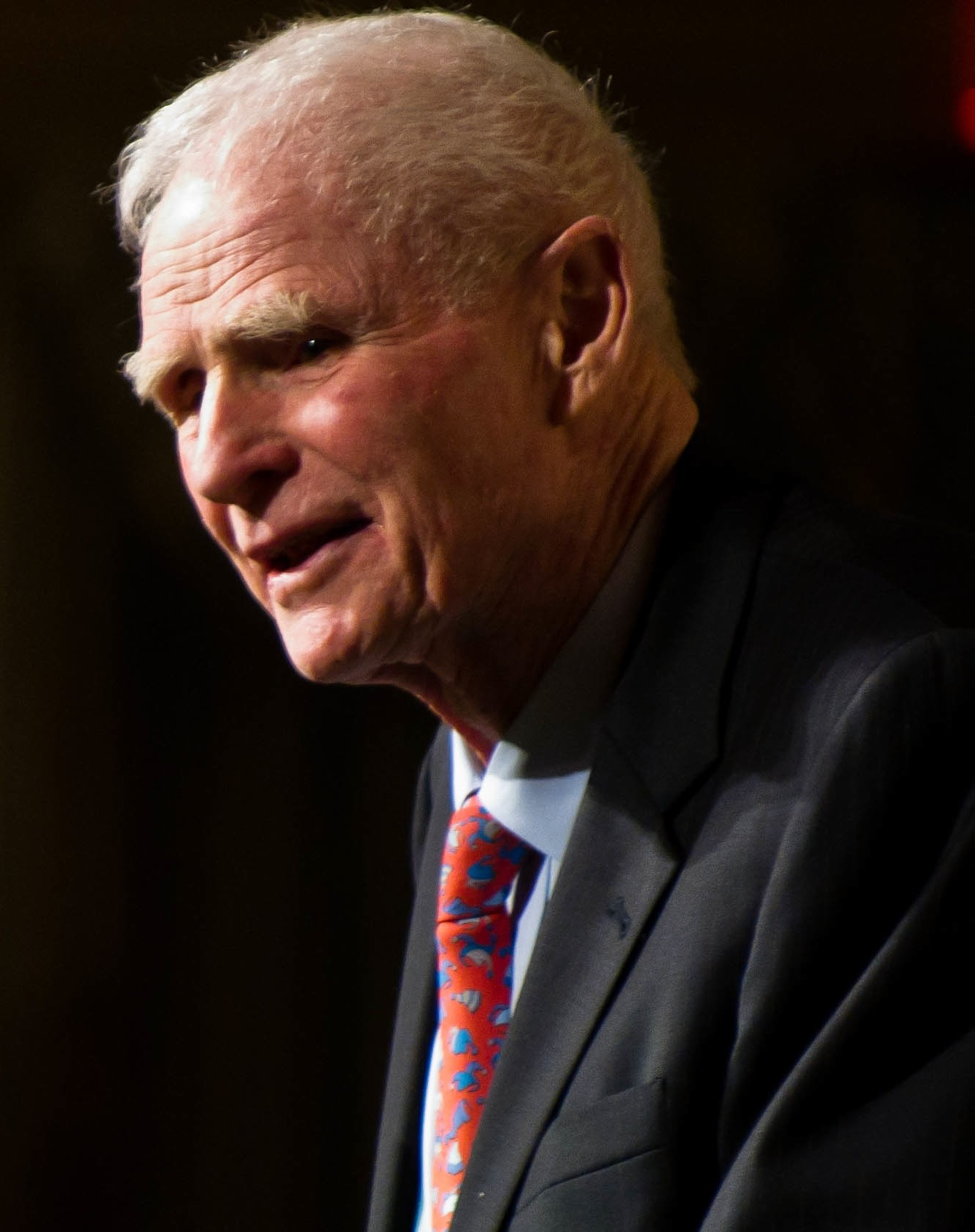
Byrne accepting honors for a career in public service from The Citizens Campaign in 2011

After leaving office in 1982, Governor Byrne became a senior partner at Carella, Byrne, Bain, Gilfillan, Cecchi, Stewart & Olstein in Roseland, New Jersey (now Carella, Byrne, Cecchi, Brody and Agnello, P.C.). Additionally, Byrne and his successor as governor, Thomas Kean, co-wrote a weekly column in The Star-Ledger, containing their "dialogue" on state and national public affairs and politics. He also taught courses at Princeton University and Rutgers University.

Despite not supporting all of his policies, Byrne said that Governor Chris Christie should run for president in 2016, calling Christie "the best candidate that the Republicans have" and complimented his "charm".

== Personal life ==
On June 27, 1953, he married Jean Featherly, with whom he had seven children. Byrne's son, Tom Byrne, was the New Jersey Democratic State Committee chair in the 1990s and was a prospective candidate for the U.S. Senate race in 2000, before withdrawing in favor of eventual winner Jon Corzine, who later became governor. Byrne's oldest granddaughter, Meaghan, who saved his life with the Heimlich maneuver at a restaurant in April 2016, worked as a legislative staffer in the U.S. House of Representatives before moving into NGO foreign policy work.

Jean and Brendan Byrne divorced in 1993 after 40 years of marriage. She died in 2015 of babesiosis, aged 88.

Byrne married Ruth Zinn, who was also divorced, in 1994.

=== 2010 assault ===
On February 16, 2010, while vacationing in London with his wife, Byrne was punched in the face by a mentally ill man near Waterloo tube station. The attacker was subsequently restrained by a London Underground station supervisor who came to Byrne's aid until the police arrived. Byrne, who had taken part in a staged charity boxing match with Muhammad Ali in 1979, joked, "At least I didn't fall down at Waterloo, as when I fought Ali."

== Death ==
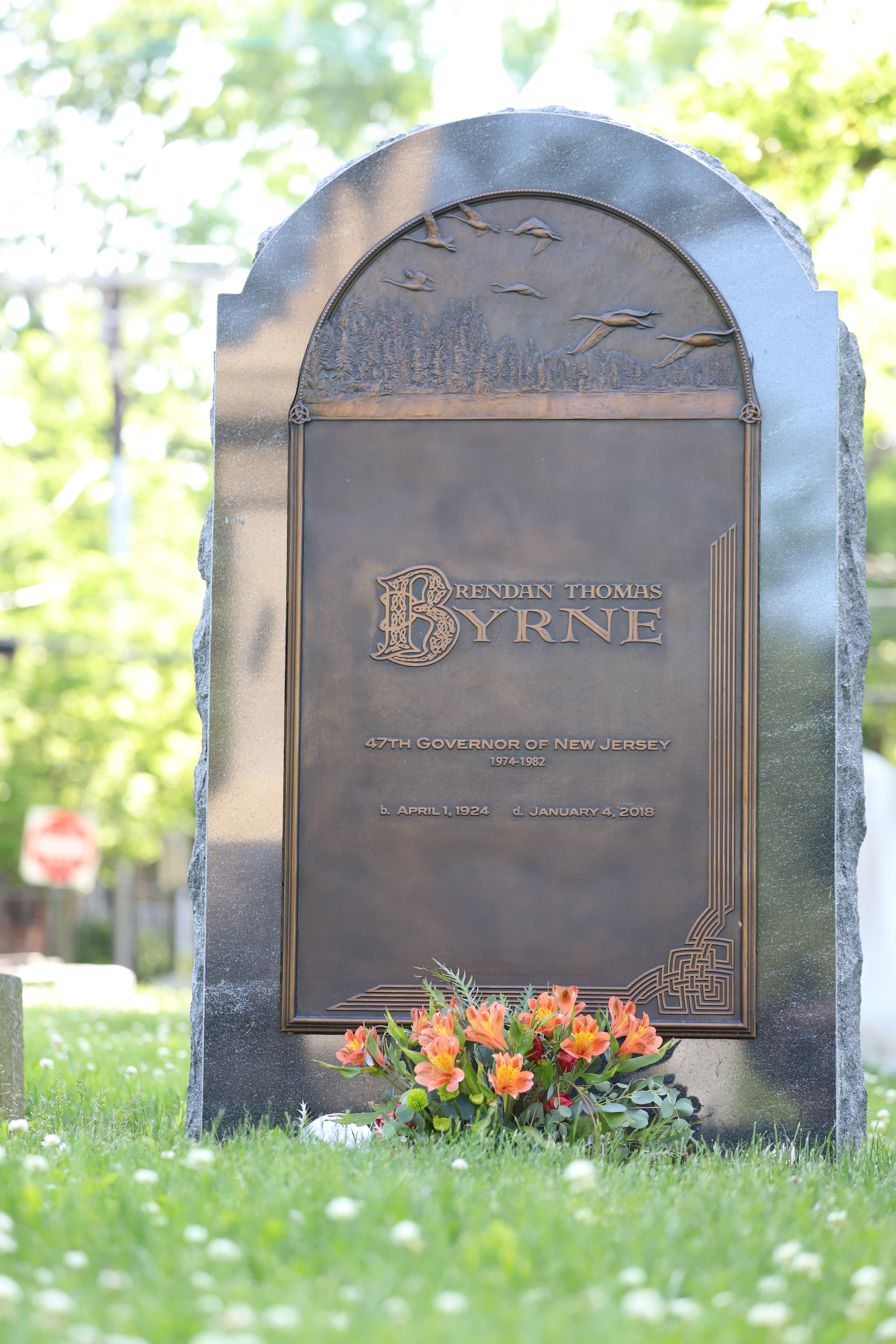
Byrne's grave in the Princeton Cemetery with orange flowers during Princeton Reunions in May 2022

Byrne died on January 4, 2018, in Livingston, New Jersey, of a lung infection at the age of 93.

His funeral was held on January 8 at the Paper Mill Playhouse in Millburn, New Jersey. Archbishop Joseph W. Tobin, then-Governor Chris Christie and Governor-elect Phil Murphy, former governors Thomas Kean, Donald DiFrancesco, Jim McGreevey, Richard Codey and Jon Corzine and U. S. Representative Bill Pascrell were in attendance. Byrne's remains were cremated and his ashes were interred in Princeton Cemetery.

== Legacy ==
From 1981 to 1996, the Meadowlands Arena in East Rutherford was named Brendan Byrne Arena. It hosted the New Jersey Devils, New Jersey Nets, and Seton Hall Pirates men's basketball. The arena was then renamed Continental Airlines Arena, followed by IZOD Center.

The Brendan T. Byrne State Forest, formerly Lebanon State Forest, in New Lisbon is named for him.

In 2006, Rutgers University's Center on the American Governor of the Eagleton Institute of Politics established the Brendan T. Byrne Archive, an online database containing various resources from the Byrne administration, including original documents and video interviews with Brendan Byrne and members of his administration.

In 2011, Byrne was inducted into the New Jersey Hall of Fame along with Queen Latifah, John Travolta, and ten others.

In 2014, Byrne's former chief counsel Donald Linky published a biography of Byrne, New Jersey Governor Brendan Byrne: The Man Who Couldn't Be Bought.

Party political offices
Preceded by Robert Meyner	Democratic nominee for Governor of New Jersey; 1973, 1977	Succeeded by James Florio
Preceded by Ella T. Grasso	Chair of the Democratic Governors Association; 1980–1981	Succeeded by Jerry Brown
Political offices
Preceded by William Cahill	Governor of New Jersey; 1974–1982	Succeeded by Thomas Kean
