= Raymond Garramone =

American politician (1926–1998)

Member of the New Jersey Senate from the 39th district
- In office January 8, 1974 – January 10, 1978
- Preceded by: District created
- Succeeded by: Frank Herbert

Personal details
- Born: August 13, 1926 New York City, New York
- Died: June 16, 1998 (aged 71)
- Party: Democratic

Raymond Garramone (August 13, 1926 – June 16, 1998) was an American Democratic Party politician who served in the New Jersey State Senate from 1974 to 1978. An engineer and businessman, he served as Mayor of Haworth, New Jersey and was elected State Senator in 1973 from the 39th Legislative District, defeating Republican ex-Assemblyman Harry Randall, Jr. by 5,057 votes. He did not seek re-election to a second term in the Senate in 1977, but instead challenged incumbent Governor Brendan Byrne in the Democratic primary for Governor of New Jersey. He finished sixth in the primary with 6,602 votes (1%).
