= Wilfred C. Menard Jr. =

United States Army general

Maj. Gen. Wilfred Charles Menard Jr.

Adjutant General of New Jersey
- In office March 20, 1974 – February 10, 1982
- Preceded by: William R. Sharp
- Succeeded by: Francis R. Gerard

Personal details
- Born: November 10, 1918
- Died: February 20, 2012 (aged 93)

Maj. Gen. Wilfred Charles Menard Jr. (November 10, 1918 – February 20, 2012) (ARNG) was the twenty-sixth Adjutant General of New Jersey. Commissioned a US Army 2nd lieutenant in 1942, he served actively with the Army during the Second World War rising to the rank of US Army captain. He continued to serve thereafter as a reserve officer in the New Jersey Army National Guard, which he commanded from 1974 to 1982. A graduate of the United States Army Field Artillery School, the United States Army Tank Destroyer School, and the United States Army War College, Menard was an experienced artillery officer. During his service with the Guard, he was briefly reactivated at the rank of Lieutenant Colonel for the Berlin Crisis of 1961. Born in Trenton, NJ, Maj. Gen. Menard was a lifelong resident of central New Jersey. His many military awards and decorations include the Distinguished Service Medal (US Army) and the Legion of Merit.
