= Richard J. Coffee =

American politician

Chairman of the New Jersey Democratic State Committee
- In office 1977–1981
- Preceded by: James P. Dugan
- Succeeded by: James F. Maloney

Member of the New Jersey Senate from Mercer County
- In office 1968–1972 Serving with Sido L. Ridolfi
- Preceded by: New seat
- Succeeded by: Joseph Merlino (District 6B)

Member of the Mercer County Board of Chosen Freeholders
- In office 1956–1968

Personal details
- Born: February 14, 1925 Lawrence Township, New Jersey
- Died: February 19, 2017 (aged 92) Plainsboro, New Jersey
- Education: Princeton High School

Richard J. Coffee (February 14, 1925 – February 19, 2017) was an American Democratic Party politician from New Jersey who served in the New Jersey Senate and as chairman of the New Jersey Democratic State Committee.

== Biography ==
Coffee was born in 1925 in Lawrence Township, Mercer County, New Jersey. He attended Princeton High School and the Merchant Marine Academy. He served as an ensign in the Merchant Marine during World War II.

His political career began in 1954 when he was elected to the Lawrence Township Committee. He served as Mayor of Lawrence Township, Mercer County, New Jersey, in 1957. He was elected to the Mercer County Board of Chosen Freeholders in 1955 and served for 12 years. As freeholder, Coffee fought to establish a park system for Mercer County. He was instrumental in the creation of the Mercer County Park Commission in 1964. He also helped establish Mercer County Community College in 1966.

In 1967, he was elected to the New Jersey Senate for a four-year term. In the Senate he was a member of the Joint Appropriations Committee and the Assistant Minority Leader. He went on to serve 17 years as Executive Director of the General Assembly Democratic Office.

Coffee served as Mercer County Democratic chairman from 1969 to 1981, and was the state chairman from 1977 to 1981.

On October 15, 2009, Coffee was honored by Mercer County Park, which was renamed Richard J. Coffee Mercer County Park in his honor for acquiring the land in the 1950s.

Coffee died on February 19, 2017, in Plainsboro, New Jersey.

Party political offices
Preceded by James P. Dugan	Chairman of the New Jersey Democratic State Committee; 1977 – 1981	Succeeded by James F. Maloney
