= William T. Cahill =

American politician (1912–1996)

William Thomas Cahill
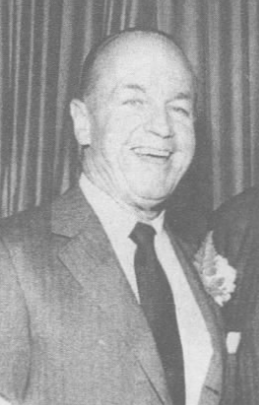
- Cahill in 1969

46th Governor of New Jersey
- In office January 20, 1970 – January 15, 1974
- Preceded by: Richard J. Hughes
- Succeeded by: Brendan Byrne

Member of the U.S. House of Representatives from New Jersey
- In office January 3, 1959 – January 19, 1970
- Preceded by: Charles A. Wolverton
- Succeeded by: Edwin B. Forsythe
- Constituency: 1st district (1959–1967); 6th district (1967–1970)

Member of the New Jersey General Assembly
- In office 1951–1953

Personal details
- Born: June 25, 1912 Philadelphia, Pennsylvania, U.S.
- Died: July 1, 1996 (aged 84) Haddonfield, New Jersey, U.S.
- Party: Republican
- Spouse: Elizabeth Myrtetus (m. 1941; died 1991)
- Education: Saint Joseph's University; Rutgers University-Camden

William Thomas Cahill (June 25, 1912 – July 1, 1996) was a liberal American politician, lawyer, and academic who served as the 46th governor of New Jersey from 1970 to 1974. A Republican, Cahill previously served in the New Jersey General Assembly and U.S. House of Representatives.

Having defeated former Democratic Governor Robert B. Meyner in the 1969 election, for reelection in 1973, but lost renomination in the Republican primary to congressman Charles W. Sandman by almost 17 points. He is the only Governor of New Jersey to lose renomination in a primary.

== Early life ==
Cahill was born in Philadelphia to Irish immigrants William P. Cahill and Rose Cahill. The family moved to Collingswood in 1919. He attended Camden Catholic High School in Camden, New Jersey, and graduated in 1929. Afterwards, Cahill graduated St. Joseph's College (now Saint Joseph's University) at Philadelphia in 1933. He returned to Camden to study at the Rutgers School of Law - Camden, receiving his law degree in 1937.

== Political career ==
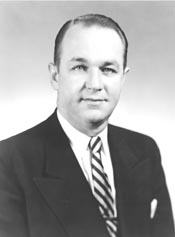
Cahill as a congressman

In 1937 and 1938, Cahill was a special agent of the Federal Bureau of Investigation. In 1939 he was admitted to the bar and began his political career. Living in Collingswood, New Jersey, Cahill was the city prosecutor of Camden, New Jersey, in 1944 and 1945, was the first assistant prosecutor of Camden County from 1948 to 1951 and was a special deputy attorney general of the State of New Jersey in 1951.

Cahill was a member of the New Jersey General Assembly from 1951 to 1953. Cahill was elected to the Eighty-sixth and to the five succeeding Congresses. During his tenure in the US House, Cahill voted for the Civil Rights Act of 1964 and the Voting Rights Act of 1965. He served in the House until resigning to assume his seat as governor, serving from January 3, 1970, to January 19, 1974. Throughout his tenure in Congress and as governor, Cahill was widely viewed as a moderate Republican.

=== Governor of New Jersey ===
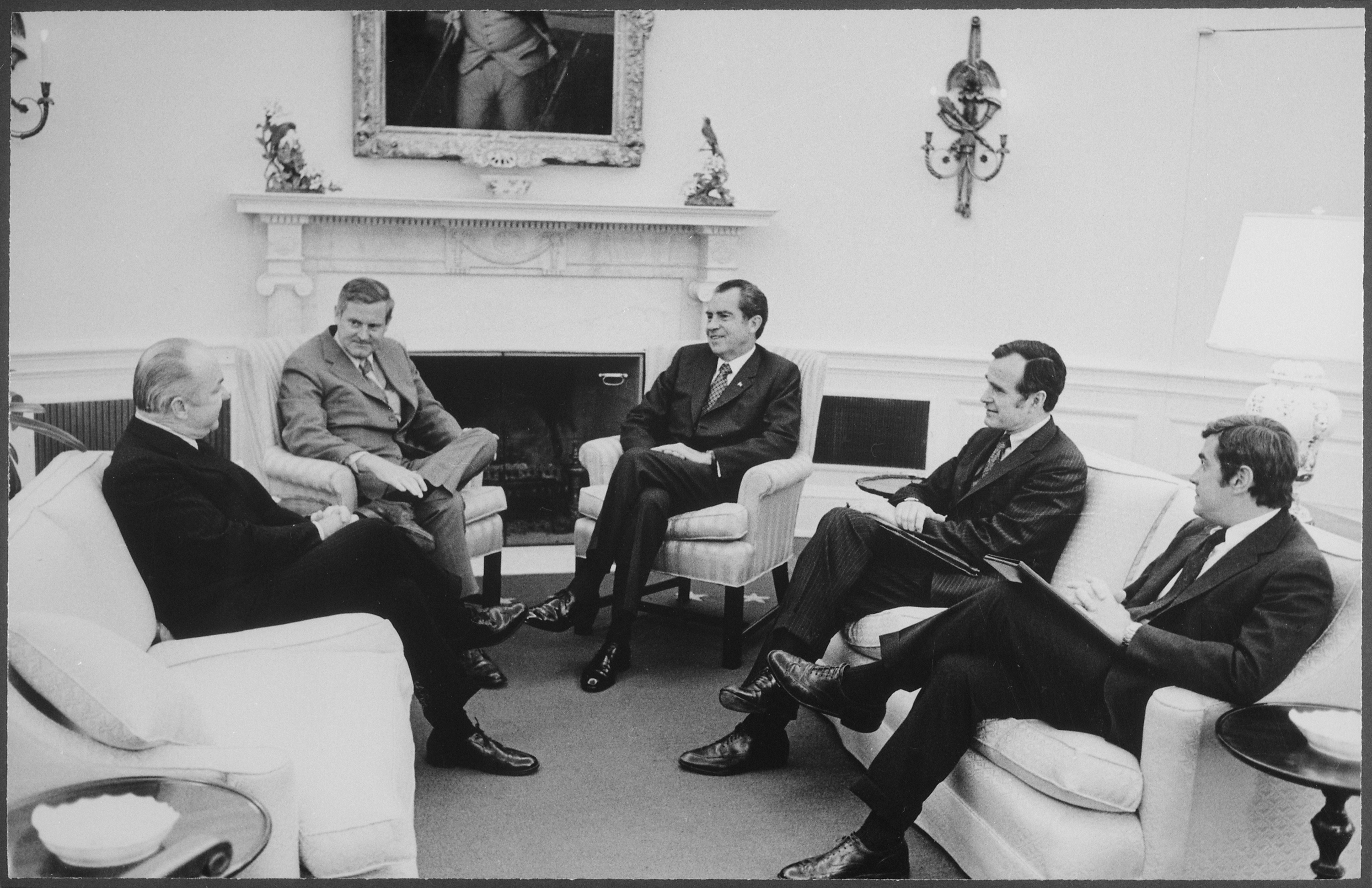
Cahill meets with President Richard Nixon, George H. W. Bush, Linwood Holton, and Kenneth Reese Cole Jr. in 1973

In 1969, Cahill ran for Governor of New Jersey, facing off against Democrat Robert B. Meyner, who had previously held the office from 1954 to 1962. Cahill defeated Meyner and became New Jersey's first Republican governor in 16 years.

Cahill served as governor from January 20, 1970, to January 15, 1974, and assumed office with a Republican-controlled legislature to support him. Among his accomplishments as governor were new automobile emission standards, an increase in the sales tax from 3 to 5 percent, the introduction of the state lottery, and the passage of no-fault auto insurance. He also played a role in bringing the New York Giants from Yankee Stadium to a new field in the Hackensack Meadowlands.

On Thanksgiving Day 1971, two months after the Attica State prison riots in upstate New York, a similar rebellion rose at Rahway State Prison. The revolt was quieted without violence, and Cahill's role in ending the conflict was widely commended. Cahill also appointed a commission that recommended the creation of a state income tax, which proved to be controversial with voters. The proposal was defeated in July 1972, but a state income tax was finally instituted four years later, after Cahill left office.

In spite of his many successes and accomplishments as governor, Cahill's term was derailed by scandal. In 1972, Secretary of State Paul J. Sherwin was convicted for fixing a $600,000 state highway contract with a contractor who returned the favor with $10,000 to Cahill's associates. Then, in April 1973, former New Jersey Republican State Committee chairman Nelson G. Gross and State Treasurer Joseph McCrane, who had been finance chairman for Cahill's 1969 campaign, were both charged with illegally making campaign donations to the governor as tax deductions. Both men were convicted the following year. Although investigators were unable to implicate Cahill in either affair, his reputation suffered as a result of these setbacks.

Cahill ran for re-election in 1973. Damaged by the scandals in his administration, he was defeated in the Republican primary election by the more conservative Congressman Charles Sandman, who went on to lose the general election to Democrat Brendan Byrne. During his final months as governor, Cahill named his predecessor, Democrat Richard J. Hughes, as chief justice of the New Jersey Supreme Court.

== Death ==
After his term as governor, Cahill was a senior fellow at the Woodrow Wilson School of Public and International Affairs at Princeton University from 1974 to 1978. Cahill died at his daughter's house in Haddonfield, New Jersey, on July 1, 1996, of peripheral artery disease. A funeral service was held at Christ the King R.C. Church. Then-governor Christine Todd Whitman, and former governors Brendan Byrne, Thomas Kean, and James Florio were in attendance. Cahill was interred at Calvary Cemetery in Cherry Hill Township, New Jersey. The William T. Cahill Center for Experiential Learning and Career Services at Ramapo College in Mahwah, New Jersey, was dedicated in his honor on September 10, 1997.

== See also ==
- List of governors of New Jersey

U.S. House of Representatives
| Preceded by Charles A. Wolverton | U.S. House of Representatives from New Jersey's 1st district January 3, 1959–January 3, 1967 | Succeeded by John E. Hunt |
| Preceded by Florence Dwyer | U.S. House of Representatives from New Jersey's 6th district January 3, 1967–January 19, 1970 | Succeeded by Edwin B. Forsythe |
Political offices
| Preceded by Richard J. Hughes | Governor of New Jersey; January 20, 1970–January 15, 1974 | Succeeded by Brendan Byrne |
Party political offices
| Preceded by Wayne Dumont | Republican Nominee for Governor of New Jersey; 1969 | Succeeded by Charles W. Sandman Jr. |
