= Gambaccini =

Gambaccini is a surname. Notable people with the surname include:

- Louis Gambaccini (1931–2018), American transportation commissioner
- Paul Gambaccini (born 1949), American-British radio personality and author
