= New Jersey Department of Transportation =

Government agency

- Seal of the NJDOT

Department overview
- Formed: December 12, 1966; 59 years ago
- Preceding department: State Highway Department
- Jurisdiction: Government of New Jersey
- Headquarters: 1035 Parkway Avenue Ewing, New Jersey
- Annual budget: US$5.4 billion (FY2027) (47% federal)
- Department executives: Priya Jain, Commissioner; Joseph D. Bertoni, Deputy Commissioner
- Website: https://www.nj.gov/transportation/

The New Jersey Department of Transportation (NJDOT) is the agency responsible for transportation issues and policy in New Jersey, including maintaining and operating the state's highway and public road system, planning and developing transportation policy, and assisting with rail, freight, and intermodal transportation issues. It is headed by the Commissioner of Transportation. The present commissioner is Priya Jain.

== History prior to 1966 ==
=== Colonial era ===
==== East Jersey Assembly ====
Pursuant to the Public Roads Act of 1676, a road was established from Middletown to Piscataway in East Jersey. The East Jersey Public Roads Act of 1682 provided an overview of the New Jersey highways, bridges, landings and ferries.

==== West Jersey Assembly ====
The Public Roads Act of 1681 established a road from Burlington to Salem in West Jersey. The West Jersey Public Roads Act of 1684 established roads between the various towns along the Delaware River.

=== Post Colonial Era ===
In 1891, the State Road Aid Law was passed by the New Jersey Legislature, establishing a $75,000 to help the New Jersey counties build highways. New Jersey became the first state to proactively establish laws and fund transportation endeavors. The roads of New Jersey now fell under the oversight of the President of the New Jersey State Board of Agriculture. Edward Burrough oversaw the road as the President of the Board of Agriculture, from 1892 to 1894.

==== Public Roads Commissioners ====
The Public Roads Act of 1894 officially established the Commissioner of Public Roads and removing it from the Board of Agriculture. Edward Burrough, the former President of the New Jersey Board of Agriculture, became the first Commissioner of Public Roads.

The State Highway Commission was created in 1909.

1894–1895	Edward Burrough
1895–1905	Henry I. Budd
1905–1911	Frederick Gilkyson
1911–1917	Colonel Edwin A. Stevens

==== State Highway Commission Chairmen ====
On March 3, 1917, the State created the State Highway Department to be governed by an eight-member State Highway Commission, led by a chairman as appointed by the New Jersey governor. On March 14, 1917, Governor Walter E. Edge appointed John Warne Herbert Jr. to the State Highway Commission of New Jersey as the first chairman of the board under the new Act. The other seven member of the original State Highway Commission, in 1917, were G.E. Blakeslee; Ira A. Kip Jr.; George W. F. Gaunt; Col. Anthony R. Kuser; Walter J. Buzby; Watson G. Clark; and Col. Edwin A. Stevens. The State Highway Commission was reduced to four members in 1923.

1917–1920	John W. Herbert
1920–1923	George L. Burton
1923–1933	Major General Hugh L. Scott
1933–1935	Colonel Arthur F. Foran

==== State Highway Commissioners ====
In 1935, the New Jersey Legislature removed the four-member commission and placed authority under a single State Highway Commissioner.

1935–1942	E. Donald Sterner
1942–1950	Spencer Miller, Jr.
1950–1954	Ransford J. Abbott
1954–1966	Dwight R. G. Palmer

== History post 1966 ==
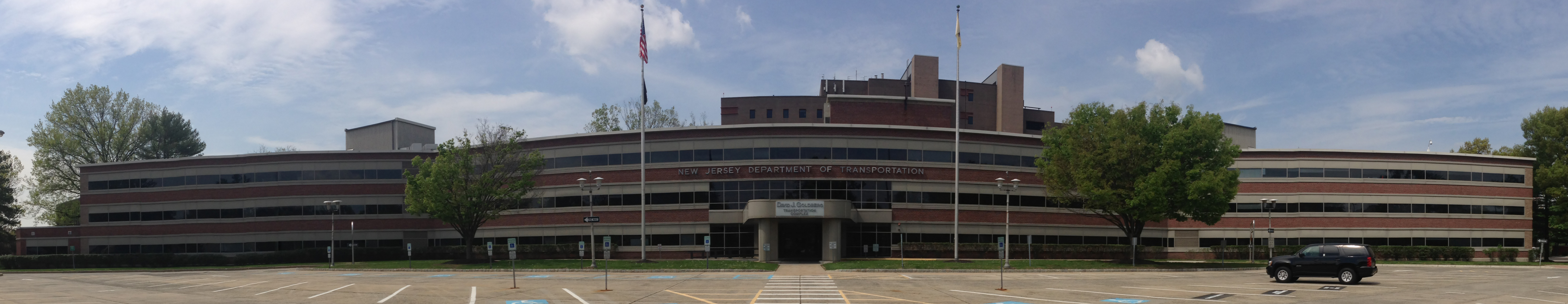
NJDOT headquarters

The agency that became NJDOT began as the New Jersey State Highway Department (NJSHD) c. 1920. NJDOT was established in 1966 as the first state transportation agency in the United States. The Transportation Act of 1966 (Chapter 301, Public Laws, 1966) established the NJDOT on December 12, 1966.

Since the late 1970s, NJDOT has been phasing out or modifying many traffic circles in New Jersey. In 1979, with the establishment of New Jersey Transit, NJDOT's rail division, which funded and supported state-sponsored passenger rail service, was folded into the new agency.

Until 2003, the NJDOT included the Division of Motor Vehicles (DMV), which was reorganized as the self-operating New Jersey Motor Vehicle Commission (MVC).

=== NJDOT Commissioners ===
- David J. Goldberg (1966–1970)
- John C. Kohl (1970–1974)
- Alan Sagner (1974–1977)
- Russell Mullen (1977–1978)
- Louis J. Gambaccini (1978–1981)
- Anne P. Canby (1981–1982)
- John P. Sheridan Jr. (1982–1985)
- Roger Bodman (1985–1986)
- Hazel Frank Gluck (1986–1989)
- Robert Innocenzi (1989–1990)
- Tom Downs (1990–1993)
- Kathy Stanwick (1993–1994)
- Dennis Keck (1994)
- Frank J. Wilson (1994–1996)
- John J. Haley (1997–1998)
- James Weinstein (1998–2001)
- Jamie Fox (2002)
- Jack Lettiere (2003–2006)
- Kris Kolluri (2006–2008)
- Stephen Dilts (2008–2010)
- James S. Simpson (2010–2014)
- Joseph Bertoni (2014)
- Jamie Fox (2014–2015)
- Richard T. Hammer (2015–2018)
- Diane Gutierrez-Scaccetti (2018–2024)
- Francis K. O'Connor (2024–2026)
- Priya Jain (2026–present)

== Divisions, programs and services ==
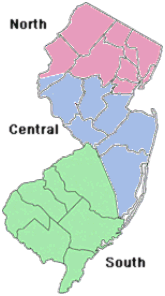
NJDOT regions

=== Public roads ===
NJDOT operates, develops, and maintains the State's public road system, including Interstate, State and Federal highways, with a total of 2,316.69 miles of NJDOT-owned and operated roads (as of July 2015). Most major highways including Interstate, U.S. and NJ State routes within New Jersey are under NJDOT jurisdiction, except toll routes including the New Jersey Turnpike, Garden State Parkway (under the New Jersey Turnpike Authority) and the Atlantic City Expressway as well as the interstate toll bridges and tunnels.

=== Freight planning ===
NJDOT develops interim and long-term plans and strategic policy on freight and shipping in and around the state. These intermodal policies cover trucking, rail, maritime and air freight.

=== Capital programs ===
The Transportation Capital Program and the Statewide Transportation Improvement Program (STIP) allocate state and federal transportation funding, including projected projects and investment.

=== Community programs ===
Assistance to local communities and grants for transportation-related projects, such as transit villages.

=== Engineering ===
This refers to technical planning, development, design and research for projects.

=== Bureau of Aeronautics ===
NJDOT's Bureau of Aeronautics has general oversight of public use airports and restricted use facilities, including airstrips, heliports and balloon ports, addresses aviation safety and provides licensing and registration on aviation facilities and aerial activities including advertising, aerial racing, and sports.

=== Railroads ===
The NJDOT was also responsible for funding and supporting passenger rail service within New Jersey and to and from nearby points from the late 1960s onward, including procuring new modern equipment and rolling stock. The agency purchased EMD GP40Ps for the Central Railroad of New Jersey in 1968, the GE U34CH locomotives and Comet I cars for the Erie Lackawanna (1970) and Arrow I, II & III electric MU cars for the Penn Central in 1968–69, 1974 and 1977–78 respectively. During 1976 NJDOT took control of passenger rail routes operated by the Penn Central, Erie Lackawanna, CNJ and Reading Lines (with Conrail operating services under contract).

In 1979, New Jersey Transit assumed responsibilities for passenger rail in New Jersey.

NJDOT is a member of the Northeast Corridor Commission.

== Traffic management ==
Statewide Traffic Management Center (STMC) in Woodbridge Township

NJDOT maintains the Statewide Traffic Management Center (sTMC) headquartered in Woodbridge Township. STMC is also the home to New Jersey State Police and the New Jersey Turnpike Authority. STMC is staffed 24/7 and is responsible for the coordination and logistics of statewide resources during major incidents within New Jersey.

== Related legislation ==
- 1966: Transportation Act of 1966, P.L. 1966, c. 301
- 2003: Motor Vehicle Security and Customer Service Act, P.L. 2003, c. 13
