= William Ronan =

American public servant and academic

1st Chairman of the Metropolitan Transportation Authority
- In office March 1, 1968 – April 26, 1974
- Governor: Nelson Rockefeller; Malcolm Wilson
- Preceded by: Position established
- Succeeded by: David L. Yunich

Chairman of the Port Authority of New York and New Jersey
- In office 1974–1977
- Governor: Hugh Carey
- Preceded by: James C. Kellogg III
- Succeeded by: Alan Sagner

Secretary to the Governor of New York
- In office 1958–1968
- Governor: Nelson Rockefeller

Personal details
- Born: November 8, 1912 Buffalo, New York, U.S.
- Died: October 15, 2014 (aged 101) West Palm Beach, Florida U.S.
- Spouse: Elena Vinadé (d. 1996)

William John Ronan (November 8, 1912 – October 15, 2014) was an American public servant and academic who founded and served as the first chairman of New York City's Metropolitan Transportation Authority, from 1968 to 1974. He subsequently served as chairman of the Port Authority of New York and New Jersey from 1974 until 1977 and remained on the board of the Port Authority until 1990. Prior to entering state government as a key aide to Governor Nelson Rockefeller of New York in 1958, he was a professor of government at New York University and served as dean of NYU's graduate school of public service from 1953 to 1958.

== Early life and education ==
William John Ronan was born in Buffalo, New York to William and Charlotte Ronan (née Ramp). His father was a businessman and his mother was a homemaker. He was raised Episcopalian and was of Irish-Alsatian descent. Both parents were "fervent" Democrats. Ronan graduated from Syracuse University in 1934, and earned a doctoral degree from New York University in international law and diplomacy. He became dean at NYU and helped establish the Wagner School of Public Service from 1953 to 1958.

== Career ==
Ronan helped found the Tri-State Transportation Commission. In 1965, he was appointed the first Chairman of the Metropolitan Commuter Transportation Authority by Governor Nelson Rockefeller. The newly formed MCTA purchased the Long Island Rail Road from the Pennsylvania Railroad.

On February 29, 1968, the MCTA published a 56-page report for Governor Rockefeller, and in it, proposed several subway and railroad improvements under the name "Metropolitan Transportation, a Program for Action". Chairman Ronan pushed for the MTA to pursue the Program for Action, saying, "We're making up for 30 years of do-nothingism". The next day, the MCTA dropped the word "Commuter" from its name and became the Metropolitan Transportation Authority (MTA). The MTA took over the operations of the other New York City-area transit systems and Ronan became chairman of the MTA.

During Ronan's tenure, the MTA oversaw the construction of three lines as part of the Program for Action: the 63rd Street Line, part of the Second Avenue Subway, and, the Archer Avenue Line. The MTA also shut down the Third Avenue elevated line in the Bronx.

== Later life ==
After stepping down from the Port Authority, Ronan left public life, retiring to Florida, became a widower after his wife of 57 years, the former Elena Vinadé, died in 1996. He died of natural causes at his house in West Palm Beach, Florida, on October 15, 2014, at the age of 101.

== See also ==
- Howard S. Cullman
- Austin Tobin
- Christopher O. Ward
