= Alan Sagner =

American politician, businessman, and philanthropist (1920–2018)

Alan L. Sagner

Chairman of the Corporation for Public Broadcasting
- In office 1996–1997
- Preceded by: Ritajean Butterworth
- Succeeded by: Diane Blair

Chairman of the Port Authority of New York and New Jersey
- In office 1977–1985
- Preceded by: William J. Ronan
- Succeeded by: Philip D. Kaltenbacher

Commissioner of the New Jersey Department of Transportation
- In office January 21, 1974 – August 15, 1977
- Governor: Brendan Byrne
- Preceded by: John Kohl
- Succeeded by: Russell Mullen

Personal details
- Born: September 13, 1920 Baltimore, Maryland, U.S.
- Died: January 3, 2018 (aged 97) Palm Beach Gardens, Florida, U.S.
- Party: Democratic
- Spouse(s): Ruth Levin, 1945-1995 (her death); Lenore Green Schottenstein (1996-present)
- Children: John Sagner, Deborah Buurma, Amy Pouliot
- Education: University of Maryland; M.A., Columbia University

Alan Louis Sagner (September 13, 1920 – January 3, 2018) was an American Democratic Party politician, businessman and philanthropist who served as New Jersey Commissioner of Transportation, as Chairman of the Port Authority of New York and New Jersey, and as Chairman of the Corporation for Public Broadcasting.

== Early life ==
Sagner was born on September 13, 1920, in Baltimore, Maryland, the son of Mary and Samuel Sagner, a manufacturer of men's clothing. He is a graduate of Forest Park High School, where he was two years behind future Vice President Spiro Agnew. He is a graduate of the University of Maryland and received an M.A. from Columbia University in American History. Sagner was married to Ruth Levin, the daughter of New Jersey real estate developer Maurice Levin, on October 21, 1945. Sagner and his brother-in-law, Martin Levin, formed Levin/Sagner, a New Jersey home building and real estate development business. Starting with a piece of land they bought from Maurice Levin in Livingston, New Jersey, Levin/Sagner began acquiring farmland in Livingston and building single-family homes. The company later developed properties in Morris County and in Pennsylvania.

Sagner became active in the community as President of the Newark Beth Israel Medical Center Board of Trustees; Vice President of Health and Hospitals Council of Metropolitan New Jersey; and as a Trustee of the New Jersey College of Medicine and Dentistry. He served as New Jersey Chairman of the Regional Plan Association from 1976 to 1977.

== Political career ==
Sagner became active in politics in 1960 on behalf of former Illinois governor Adlai Stevenson, who was mounting a third bid for the Democratic presidential nomination. He attended the Democratic National Convention in Los Angeles as a Stevenson volunteer. He became involved in Democrats for Good Government, a group seeking to reform the Democratic Party in Essex County, New Jersey, in opposition to the Democratic County Chairman, Dennis F. Carey. He was part of the successful campaign of Richard J. Hughes for Governor of New Jersey, and served as New Jersey co-chairman of Citizens for Humphrey-Muskie in 1968.

In 1973, Sagner became the finance chairman for Brendan Byrne, who was seeking the Democratic nomination for Governor of New Jersey.

He was a delegate to the 1984 Democratic National Convention, pledged to Walter Mondale.

Sagner was a trustee of the Democratic National Committee in from 1988 to 1992, and served as chairman of the New Jersey Business Council for Clinton-Gore in 1992.

He was a founder of the Fair Play for Cuba Committee in 1960.

=== Commissioner of transportation ===
On January 3, 1975, Governor-elect Brendan Byrne appointed Sagner to serve in his cabinet as the New Jersey Commissioner of Transportation. In his announcement, Byrne stressed that while Sagner lacked transportation experience, he had strong administrative abilities. He named Manuel Carballo, a former assistant counsel to Governor Hughes and the Acting Highway Commissioner under New York City Mayor John Lindsay, as the Deputy Commissioner.

In 1975, the executive board of the New Jersey AFL-CIO called for Sagner's resignation amidst a bitter dispute between organized labor over Sagner's unsuccessful efforts to obtain federal highway construction funds. A month later, Sagner acknowledged that John Nero, a Camden County Democratic leader, had offered $25,000 to the 1973 Byrne campaign in exchange for appointment as the head of the state Alcoholic Beverage Control Commission. Sagner told investigators looking into corruption allegations that he turned Nero down.

=== Port Authority of New York and New Jersey Chairman ===
Sagner resigned as Commissioner of Transportation in June 1977 to become the Chairman of the Port Authority of New York and New Jersey. His appointment marked the resolution of a conflict between Byrne and New York Governor Hugh Carey over control of the bi-state transportation agency. Sagner's predecessor, Dr. William J. Ronan, had been widely criticized for frequent international travel at Port Authority expense. The New Jersey State Senate confirmed his nomination by a vote of 38–1 on January 21, 1974. Anthony Imperiale, a Newark independent, was the only Senator to oppose Sagner. Sagner remained as Chairman after Republican Thomas Kean was elected Governor in 1981. He stepped down in 1985 when Kean named Philip Kaltenbacher as Port Authority Chairman. When Kean ran for re-election in 1985, Sagner backed Democrat Peter Shapiro, who had begun his political career as an aide at the state Department of Transportation in 1974.

=== Corporation for Public Broadcasting ===
President Bill Clinton nominated Sagner to serve on the Board of Director of the Corporation for Public Broadcasting on March 8, 1994. On May 10, 1994, the United States Senate Committee on Commerce, Science, and Transportation met to consider Sagner's nomination. Sagner's nomination initially faced opposition from Senate Republicans, who criticized his ownership of The Nation, a magazine with a liberal political philosophy, and Senator John McCain questioned his involvement as a founder of the Fair Play for Cuba Committee in 1960. McCain also questioned Sagner's experience in public broadcasting issues and viewed him as a political appointee who would continue when McCain and Senate Minority Leader Bob Dole called a liberal bias in political reporting.

After a five-month battle, he was eventually confirmed by the Senate.

Sagner served as Chairman of the CPB from 1996 to 1997.

== Later years ==
Sagner was married to Ruth Levin Sagner (1924-1995), a social worker, from 1945 until her death on January 27, 1995. The Sagners were residents of South Orange, New Jersey. They had three children: John Sagner, Deborah Sagner Buurma, and Amy Sagner Pouliot. On December 1, 1996, Sagner married Lenore Green Schottenstein (Born 1935), a director of M/I Schottenstein Company, a Columbus, Ohio home building company.

He served as a trustee of The Century Foundation.

Sagner died at his home in Palm Beach Gardens, Florida, on January 3, 2018. He was aged 97.
