= Anne Canby =

American government official

Anne P. Canby

Commissioner of New Jersey Department of Transportation
- In office November 16, 1981 – April 16, 1982; Acting: August 13, 1981 – November 16, 1981
- Governor: Brendan Byrne
- Preceded by: Louis Gambaccini
- Succeeded by: John Sheridan

Personal details
- Education: Wheaton College (Massachusetts)

Anne P. Canby served in the cabinet of Governor Brendan Byrne as the New Jersey Commissioner of Transportation from 1981 to 1982 and in the cabinet of Governor Thomas R. Carper as the Delaware Secretary of Transportation from 1993 to 2001. She also served as the Treasurer of the Massachusetts Bay Transportation Authority, and Deputy Assistant Secretary of the U.S. Department of Transportation. She is the President of Surface Transportation Policy Partnership.

A native of Delaware, Canby attended Wheaton College. While serving as Commissioner of Transportation in New Jersey, she would sometimes ride her bicycle from her home in Pennington to her office in Trenton.
