= Russell Mullen =

American politician (1924–2019)

Russell H. Mullen

New Jersey Commissioner of Transportation
- In office August 15, 1977 – May 22, 1978
- Preceded by: Alan Sagner
- Succeeded by: Louis Gambaccini

Personal details
- Born: September 16, 1924 Pittsburgh, Pennsylvania
- Died: April 8, 2019 (aged 94) Hopewell Township, New Jersey, United States

Russell H. Mullen (September 16, 1924 - April 8, 2019) served as Acting Commissioner of the New Jersey Department of Transportation from August 14, 1977 to May 22, 1978. He was in the cabinet of Governor Brendan Byrne. Mullen began his career as a reporter for the Associated Press in the Newark and Trenton bureaus, and joined the staff of the New Jersey State Highway Commission in 1961. From 1971 to 1975, he was the Director of Construction for New York City under Mayors John Lindsay and Abraham Beame. He returned to New Jersey in 1975 as the Assistant Commissioner of Transportation for Transportation Planning and Project Coordination. Mullen retired from the Department of Transportation in September 1991 after 31 years. Mullen became Acting Commissioner when Alan Sagner resigned to become Chairman of the Port Authority of New York and New Jersey and served until Louis Gambaccini assumed the post in 1978.
