= Program for Action =

New York City Subway expansion program (1968–1989)

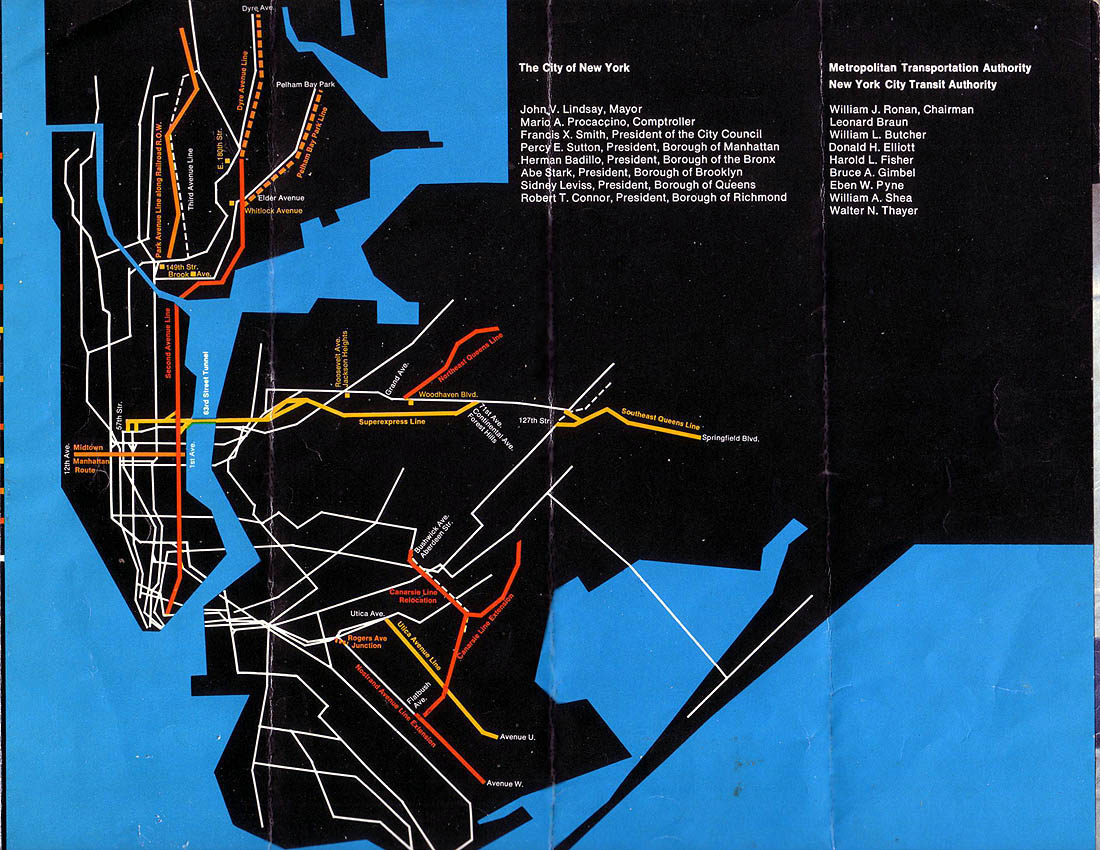
1969 plan

Metropolitan Transportation: A Program for Action, also known as simply the Program for Action, the Grand Design, or the New Routes Program, was a proposal in the mid-1960s for a large expansion of mass transit in New York City, created under then-Mayor John Lindsay. Originally published on February 29, 1968, the Program for Action was one of the most ambitious expansion plans in the history of the New York City Subway. The plan called for 50 miles (80 km) of tracks to be constructed, and more than 80% of the new trackage was to be built in the borough of Queens. The $2.9 billion plan also called for improvements to other modes of mass transit, such as the present-day Long Island Rail Road and Metro-North Railroad commuter rail systems, and further integration between mass transit and the New York City-area airport system.

Transport improvements built under the Program for Action were supposed to relieve overcrowding on existing transit modes in the New York City area. However, even though many of the lines and transport connections proposed in the Program for Action were approved, New York City nearly went bankrupt in 1975, causing all but two of these projects to be canceled due to a lack of funds. The remaining projects, the 63rd Street and Archer Avenue lines, were both dramatically truncated from their original lengths, and both lines opened much later than originally projected. In total, only six stations and 15 miles (24 km) of tracks were added under the Program for Action.

== Context ==
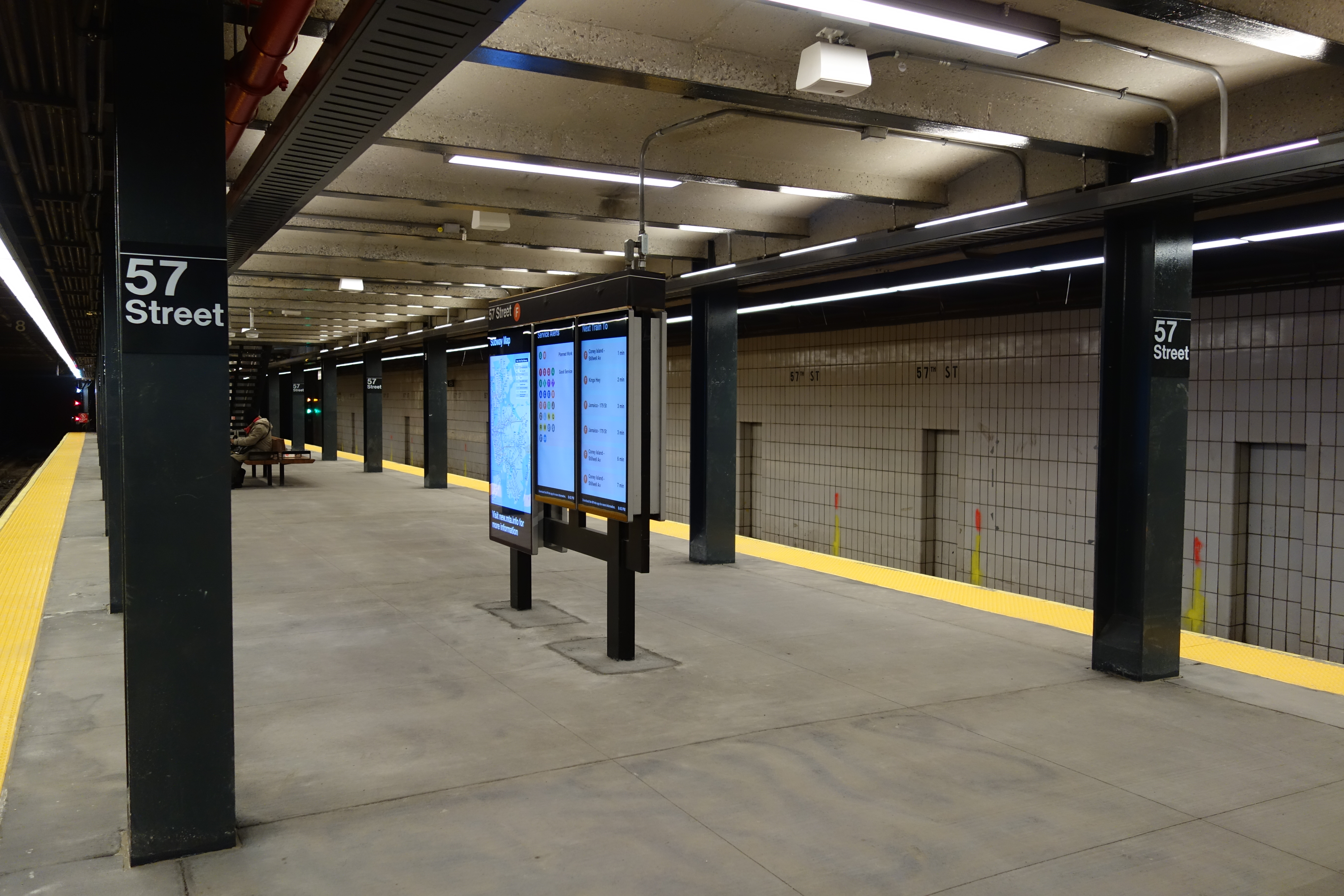
The 57th Street station of the IND Sixth Avenue Line, which predated the Program for Action

In the 1960s, the New York metropolitan area had 18 million residents across 13,000 square miles (34,000 km^{2}), and the area's population was expanding greatly at the time, especially in the suburbs, to where many city residents relocated. In 1965, the Metropolitan Commuter Transportation Authority (MCTA) was created by the New York State Legislature to operate the bankrupt Long Island Rail Road. Two years later, voters passed a $2.5 billion bond issue that would pay for transport infrastructure in New York State. The MCTA's chairman at the time, William Ronan, said that any extensions of the New York City Subway that were funded using the bond issue would not be complete for at least another 5 years.

In 1968, the MCTA absorbed the New York City Transit Authority (NYCTA or TA) of New York City, and began a long-term lease of several lines of the Penn Central that would become the Metro-North Railroad. That year, US$600,000,000 (equivalent to $5.555×10^{9} in 2025 (Note: 1634–1699: McCusker, J. J. (1997). How Much Is That in Real Money? A Historical Price Index for Use as a Deflator of Money Values in the Economy of the United States: Addenda et Corrigenda (PDF). American Antiquarian Society. 1700–1799: McCusker, J. J. (1992). How Much Is That in Real Money? A Historical Price Index for Use as a Deflator of Money Values in the Economy of the United States (PDF). American Antiquarian Society. 1800–present: Federal Reserve Bank of Minneapolis. "Consumer Price Index (estimate) 1800–".)) was made available to the MCTA, as part of a $2.5 billion (equivalent to $2.3146×10^{10} in 2025) bond for transportation passed by the New York State legislature. The city was already intending to build line extensions in all four boroughs so that most riders would need at most one transfer to get to their destination. The original plan was to tear down the IRT Third Avenue Line in the Bronx; build the Second Avenue Subway in Manhattan and the Bronx with a 48th Street spur; extend the IRT Nostrand Avenue Line down Flatbush Avenue in Brooklyn; build a 63rd Street Tunnel for the Long Island Rail Road (LIRR); and create a LIRR rail link to John F. Kennedy International Airport in Queens.

== Report publication ==
On February 29, 1968, the MCTA published a 56-page report for New York Governor Nelson A. Rockefeller, and in it, proposed several subway and railroad improvements under the name "Metropolitan Transportation, a Program for Action" (alternatively called the "Grand Design"). Executives involved with the proposal included New York baseball executive William Shea. The Program for Action was put forward simultaneously with other development and transportation plans under the administration of Mayor John Lindsay. This included Lindsay's Linear City plan for housing and educational facilities, and the projected construction of several Interstate Highways, many of which were originally proposed by Robert Moses. On March 1, a day after the release of the plans, the MCTA became the MTA.

In its rationale for the Program for Action, the MCTA stated, "By 1985, this region will have 25 million people. ... The prospects, based upon the best available projections, are that the population growth will take place principally in the suburbs. New York City is not expected to grow much by 1985. Its dwelling population will redistribute somewhat, however, with the outer areas of the city — Staten Island, Queens, parts of Brooklyn and the Bronx — growing, while the older areas closer to the core remain relatively stable in population." The city was expected to gain 2.5 million jobs in these two decades, and the 8.6-square-mile (22 km^{2}) Manhattan central business district already had 7.8 million employees.

The two-phase Program for Action would cost $2.9 billion ($26.8 billion in 2025) in total. The MTA had over $1 billion on hand allocated for the program, and a large portion of this money had come from the bond issue in 1967. A lot of this funding would also come from the Triborough Bridge and Tunnel Authority, which was running large surpluses of $25 million per year. As part of the Program for Action, existing elevated structures considered obsolete or dilapidated were to be replaced with new subways, in part to encourage development in those neighborhoods. The eastern end of the BMT Jamaica Line in the Jamaica, Queens business district was to be replaced with the BMT Archer Avenue Line, while the remainder of the IRT Third Avenue Line in the Bronx was to be torn down in favor of a new subway line running adjacent to the Metro-North Harlem Line tracks under Park Avenue. As with the city's original plan, new subway lines would provide transit access to areas previously underserved by public transport, while railroad improvements would improve Metro-North and Long Island Rail Road service. Stations at Grand Street and 57th Street on the IND Sixth Avenue Line, completed in 1967–1968 as part of the Chrystie Street Connection—the precursor project to the Program for Action—were to be tied into lines built under the new program. A subway map was also drawn up to illustrate planned service patterns upon the program's completion. The new extensions totaled over 50 miles (80 km) of new route miles.

MTA Chairman Ronan pushed for the MTA to pursue the Program for Action, saying, "We're making up for 30 years of do-nothingism". In July 1968, the Regional Plan Association released a separate report supporting the planned expansion. Two months later, on September 20, 1968, the New York City Board of Estimate and Mayor John Lindsay approved six of the Transit Authority's eight recommended routes at the cost of $1.3 billion (12 billion in 2025).

== Phase I ==
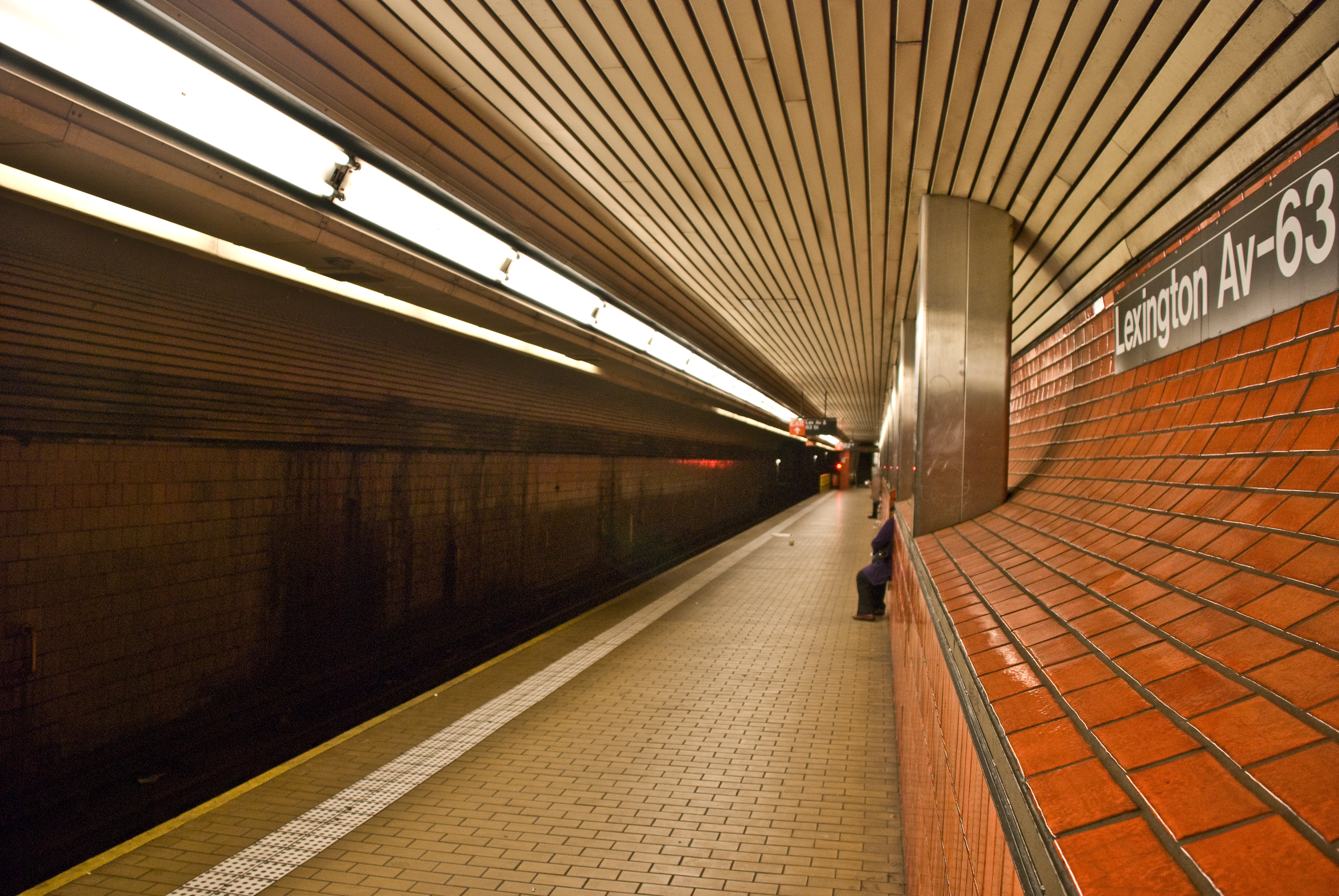
The Lexington Avenue–63rd Street station, one of six ultimately built as part of the Program for Action, prior to its 2010s renovation

Phase I consisted of new subway lines to supplement the IND Queens Boulevard Line and the IRT Lexington Avenue Line, as well as new interlockings and modernized station termini to increase train capacity. It would also comprise the renovation of deteriorating transit routes. Originally, Phase I was to cost $961 million, but costs went up to $1.6 billion. Phase I would have been completed over the span of a decade.

=== Queens lines ===
==== 63rd Street–Southeast Queens line ====
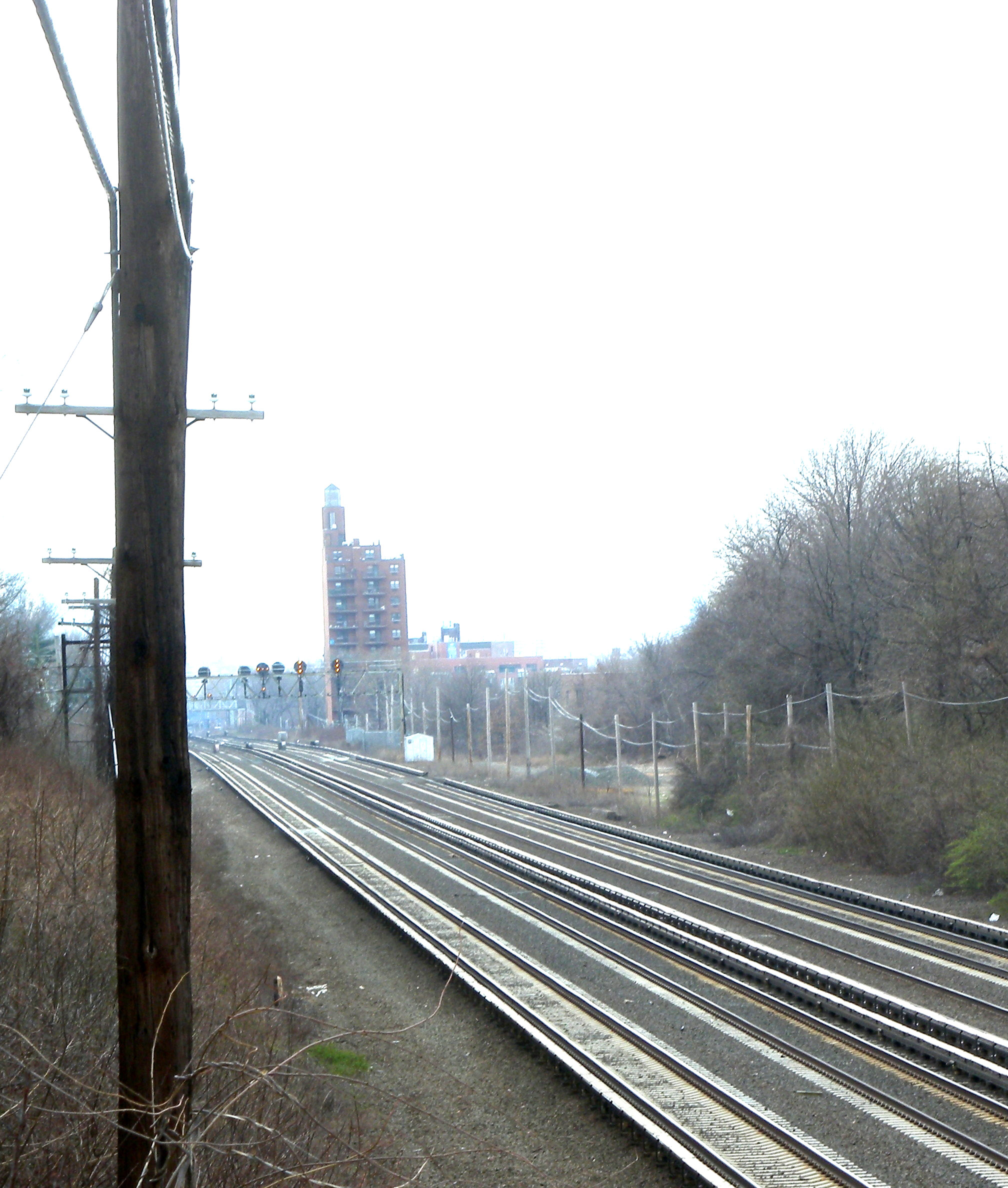
The super-express bypass would have used the outermost trackways of the Long Island Rail Road's Main Line (shown). LIRR service would use the four tracks shown here, which would have been the inner tracks of the bypass.

Phase I's flagship project was the 63rd Street–Southeast Queens line, which would stretch from the existing 57th Street subway station in Midtown Manhattan to the existing Laurelton LIRR station in Springfield Gardens. The construction of this line was to be split up into three parts. The first part, Route 131–A, would run from Sixth and Seventh Avenues in Manhattan below 63rd Street and the East River to Northern Boulevard. The next part, Route 131–B, the Super–Express Bypass Line, would continue along the LIRR right-of-way to Forest Hills. And finally, Route 131–D, the Southeastern Queens Line, would build a branch of the Queens Boulevard Line at Briarwood through Downtown Jamaica to Springfield Gardens via the LIRR's Atlantic Branch, with a ramp to eliminate the Jamaica Avenue elevated structure in Downtown Jamaica.

The westernmost part of the line entailed aggressive completion of the 63rd Street Tunnel, as well as the connections from the tunnel to the IND Sixth Avenue Line and the BMT Broadway Line. The 63rd Street tunnel under the East River would have two subway tracks on its upper level and two LIRR tracks on its lower level. The cross-river portion of the line would reduce overcrowding on the IND Queens Boulevard Line, on the IRT Flushing Line, and on the 60th Street Tunnel's services. The 63rd Street tunnel would facilitate service between the Queens Boulevard Line and the Second Avenue Subway, via bellmouths west of Roosevelt Island which turn south towards Midtown and Lower Manhattan; these turnouts may be used for the third and fourth phases of a new Second Avenue Subway project, which started in 2007.

East of Northern Boulevard, where there would be a track junction with the Queens Boulevard Line, the 63rd Street–Southeast Queens line would become a "super-express" bypass of the Queens Boulevard line. This bypass, which was proposed due to the overall congestion of the line during peak hours, was originally a single "high speed express track", with no intermediate stops, in order to allow trains to travel at speeds of up to 70 miles per hour (110 km/h). The bypass would have used one of the two trackways parallel to, and surrounding, the four-track LIRR Main Line; the trackways, formerly used by the Rockaway Beach Branch, are currently unused. It would stretch from the 63rd Street Line east of 21st Street–Queensbridge near the Sunnyside Yard, with the possibility of access to the 60th Street and 53rd Street Tunnels. At its east end, it would have left the LIRR right-of-way near Whitepot Junction and ran under Yellowstone Boulevard to the Queens Boulevard Line near 71st Avenue station. The 71st Avenue station would have been converted into a bi-level or tri-level station, with the super express tracks using the lower level(s) built south of the current station, before rejoining the main line Queens Boulevard tracks.

Later plans called for two tracks and an intermediate stop next to the current Woodside LIRR station; there would have also been a three-track station along the 63rd Street Line at Northern Boulevard, adjacent to the existing Queens Plaza station. The bypass and proposed Woodside station would have necessitated the widening of the LIRR Main Line right-of-way onto private property west of Winfield Junction, where the Main Line merges with the Port Washington Branch, and reorganization of the track layout in the Sunnyside Yards. The IND Queens Boulevard Line was to be reverse-signaled as well to further increase capacity.

In order to provide enough capacity for the line, the GG would have had to be taken off of the Queens Boulevard Line, and a turnback was necessary to provide a new terminal for the line. When the 63rd Street Connection opened in 2001, the Court Square station was rebuilt to provide a turnback facility for the line, which by then was renamed to G.

The Southeast Queens portion of the line would split from the IND Queens Boulevard Line using pre-existing bellmouths at Briarwood, would go to Springfield Boulevard in southeastern Queens using the LIRR Atlantic Branch, with a transfer to the LIRR at Jamaica. This Southeast Queens extension, which would use the upper level of the planned bi-level Archer Avenue subway, was the most important of several proposed lines along LIRR branches; it was originally intended to extend to the Laurelton LIRR station. While the upper level of the Archer Avenue subway would serve Queens Boulevard trains to Southeast Queens, the lower level for the BMT, which was to be built as part of Phase 2 as Route 133, would extend under Archer Avenue to 188th Street in Hollis. Both lines were only built to Jamaica Center; a LIRR extension would have necessitated the construction of new stations or the conversion of existing facilities along the right-of-way, as well as added additional capacity on which to run trains.

==== Long Island Expressway branch and other Queens lines ====
Another less publicized plan, Route 131-C, which was also separate from the 63rd Street–Southeast Queens Line, was for a new double-tracked subway line, which would diverge from the IND Queens Boulevard Line west of Woodhaven Boulevard and go to Kissena Boulevard via a right-of-way parallel and adjacent to the Long Island Expressway (LIE; part of Interstate 495). In Phase I, it would go to Kissena Boulevard at Queens College, and in Phase II, to Fresh Meadows and Bayside. This "Northeastern Queens" line would have been built in conjunction with the planned widening of the expressway. The subway tracks would have been placed under the expressway or its service roads, or in the median of a widened LIE in a similar manner to the Blue Line of the Chicago "L". It had been previously proposed to run the line from the 63rd Street tunnel under Northern Boulevard to Flushing (near the current Main Street station), then south under Kissena and Parsons Boulevards to meet with the LIE at Queens College. A similar line along the corridor had been proposed in the 1929 and 1939 IND Second System plans as an extension of the BMT Broadway Line east of the 60th Street Tunnel, when the LIE was called Nassau Boulevard and later Horace Harding Boulevard prior to the construction of the expressway.

A connection to the defunct LIRR Rockaway Beach Branch, not part of the main project, was proposed in 1963 and again in 1967, as were branches along other LIRR lines to outer Queens areas without rapid transit service. An alternate to the Southeast Queens line was also proposed in 1963 and again in 1967 as an extension of the IND Fulton Street Line, east from Euclid Avenue under Pitkin Avenue and Linden Boulevard, or east from Lefferts Boulevard under Liberty Avenue. Both options would continue east to Jamaica, then turn south under Merrick Boulevard to Springfield Boulevard. The Rockaway extension and both Fulton Line extensions were previously proposed as part of the 1929 and 1939 IND Second System plans, and were ultimately not incorporated into the main Program For Action plan.

=== Second Avenue Subway lines ===
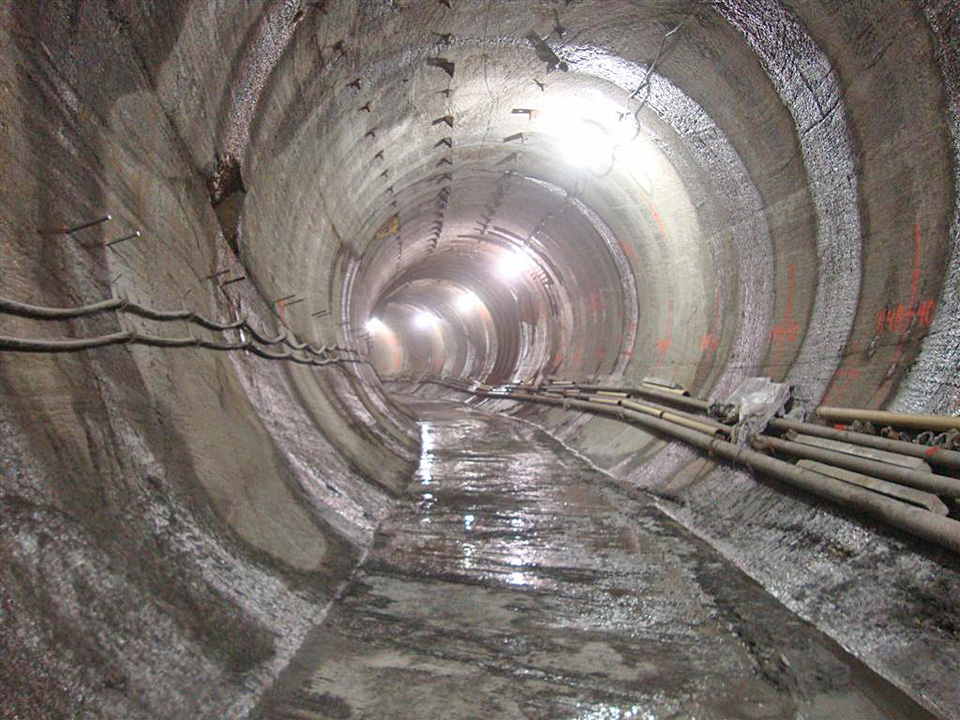
One of the tunnels from the BMT 63rd Street Line to the Second Avenue Subway

The Second Avenue Subway (SAS), a planned line going back to the late 1910s, was to be constructed from Water Street in the Battery to East 180th Street in the Bronx. The line was to be completed in three phases. The first phase, Route 132–A would have built the line from 34th Street to 126th Street, with connections to the 63rd Street Tunnel. The next phase, Route 132–B would continue the line farther north to East 180th Street in the Bronx, and this phase would connect with three existing lines. The final phase, Route 132–C would extend south from 34th Street to Bridge and Water Streets near the Battery. The SAS was prioritized due to overcrowding on the IRT Lexington Avenue Line, which was the only remaining rapid transit service on the east side in Midtown and Upper Manhattan. The Upper Manhattan portion of the Second Avenue line, from 63rd Street in Manhattan to 138th Street in the Bronx (near the current Third Avenue–138th Street station), would be built as two tracks. Stops for the SAS were proposed at Broad, Houston, 34th, 48th, 57th, 86th, 106th, and 125th Streets. Originally, Upper East Side residents complained about the lack of stations at 72nd and 96th Streets; while the 72nd Street station was later inserted into the SAS's construction plan, the 96th Street station did not get added.

To provide service in the Bronx, the IRT Pelham Line and IRT Dyre Avenue Line, served by Lexington Avenue trains, would be converted to B Division standards and connected to the Second Avenue line. IND Second Avenue Line trains would run east under 138th Street, then along the right-of-way of Amtrak's Northeast Corridor from 138th Street to a point near the Bruckner Expressway and Westchester Avenue as an express bypass of the Pelham line, after which the line would split into a Pelham branch and a Dyre Avenue branch.

The Brook Avenue station just east of Third Avenue–138th Street on the IRT Pelham Line would be reconstructed to allow a cross-platform interchange. Further north, there would be a connection with the IRT Pelham Line near Westchester Avenue at the Whitlock Avenue station, and station platforms north to Pelham Bay Park would be narrowed and lengthened to accommodate the longer and wider B Division trains from the Second Avenue Subway. IRT local service on the Pelham Line would terminate at Hunts Point Avenue one stop south.

The Dyre Avenue Branch, meanwhile, would continue north along the former New York, Westchester and Boston Railway (NYW&B)'s right-of-way to Dyre Avenue. The stations along the IRT Dyre Avenue Line, the only portion of the NYW&B to be reactivated for subway service, would also be shaved back, as the platforms had been widened to accommodate the narrower A Division trains on that line. The platforms on the Dyre Avenue Line would be extended to at least 600 feet to accommodate 10-car B Division trains. The junction north of East 180th Street between the Dyre and White Plains Road Lines, including the latter's approach to the station, would be rebuilt to eliminate the sharp curves at the station approach; the station itself would be reconfigured to allow cross-platform interchanges. Related to the Second Avenue Line, the sharp curves connecting the Lexington Avenue and White Plains Road Lines at 149th Street–Grand Concourse would also be removed.

=== Other lines ===
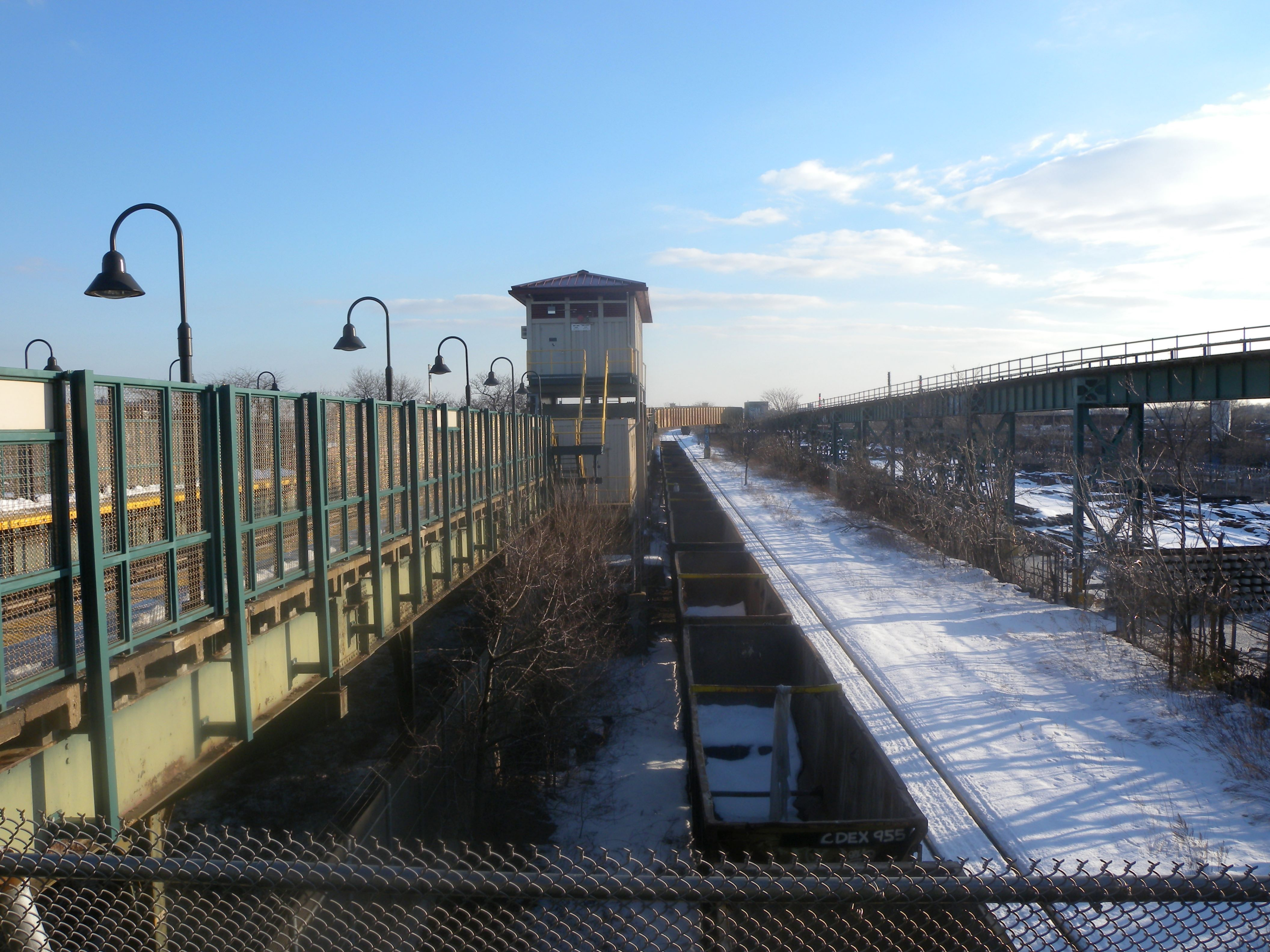
The BMT Canarsie Line, at left, would have been shifted west to a new structure along the Bay Ridge Branch, at right, under the Program for Action.

In Manhattan, a "cup handle" branch, also known as the Lower East Side Loop or Route 103-B, of the IND Sixth Avenue Line would diverge east of the Second Avenue station under Houston Street, turn north under Avenue C with an intermediate stop at Eighth Street, turn west at 14th Street, and merge with the BMT 14th Street–Canarsie Line to Eighth Avenue. This branch would have served Alphabet City, a neighborhood that was underserved by public transit. This "Avenue C Cuphandle" was proposed because many of the Alphabet City's residents were working-class poor, and the SAS would not come close enough to serve the residents of Alphabet City. This route was approved by the Board of Estimate on March 19, 1970.

In Brooklyn, several extensions were proposed to serve the then-burgeoning areas of Mill Basin and Spring Creek. The Rogers Junction on the IRT Eastern Parkway Line was a serious traffic bottleneck during the rush hours due to the IRT Nostrand Avenue Line tracks' at-grade junctions with the bi-level IRT Eastern Parkway Line. The Rogers Junction would have to be reconstructed with flying junctions to increase capacity for several extensions. The initial plan had the IRT Nostrand Avenue Line would be extended past Flatbush Avenue–Brooklyn College along Flatbush Avenue to Avenue U at Kings Plaza. Other plans had the line extended along Nostrand Avenue from Avenue H, where the exiting tunnel ends, to Sheepshead Bay at Avenue W or Voorhies Avenue; this second plan had been proposed as part of the line's original construction. The Nostrand Avenue plan, Route 29–C, which was approved by the Board of Estimate on June 3, 1969, would have had three stations added at Kings Highway, Avenue R, and Avenue W, with a storage yard constructed south of Avenue W. A branch of the Eastern Parkway line, the Utica Avenue Line or Route 57–B, was also proposed to be extended to Flatbush Avenue and Avenue U, however via Utica Avenue, which was also a long-planned extension. There would have been four stops on the line. The stations would have been at Winthrop Street, with an exit at Rutland Road, at Kings Highway, with an exit/entrance at Glenwood Road, but none at Kings Highway, and a terminal station at Kings Plaza and Avenue U. The stop at Kings Highway would have had a connection to the line running via the Bay Ridge Branch (see below), and it would have had an exit at East 48th Street. The IRT New Lots Line in East New York, meanwhile, would be extended southerly through the Livonia Yard to Flatlands Avenue; this line would run at ground level.

Also in Brooklyn, the BMT Canarsie Line would gain an eastern branch to Spring Creek, serving Starrett City (now Spring Creek Towers). The mainline would also be lengthened from its southern terminus at Rockaway Parkway to a new terminus in Midwood and Flatlands near the existing Flatbush Avenue–Brooklyn College IRT station. The reroute would not use the existing segment between New Lots Avenue and Rockaway Parkway. (Note: This would probably have resulted in one of three service patterns: A Canarsie Line branch service; A Canarsie Line shuttle; Abandonment of this segment) Later plans suggested extending the line as far west as McDonald Avenue near the Avenue I station of the IND Culver Line or possibly to New Utrecht Avenue to the New Utrecht Avenue/62nd Street station, creating crosstown service through central Brooklyn. It was also proposed to relocate the Canarsie Line west of its current right-of-way south of Broadway Junction, along the parallel LIRR Bay Ridge Branch (currently a freight-only branch) or in the median of the proposed Queens Interboro Expressway and Cross Brooklyn Expressway, which would have been built along both the LIRR branch and Linden Boulevard. The re-alignment would have facilitated both extensions. The current Bushwick Avenue, Broadway Junction and Atlantic Avenue stations would have been consolidated into one station on the Bay Ridge Line, new Sutter Avenue and Livonia Avenue stations would have been built, and the East 105th Street station would be replaced with a station at Rockaway Avenue on the Bay Ridge Line. Additional stations would have been built at Remsen Avenue, Ralph Avenue, Utica Avenue to connect with the Utica Avenue Line, Nostrand Avenue to connect with the Nostrand Avenue Line, Avenue H to connect with the Brighton Line, and McDonald Avenue to connect to the Culver Line before terminating at New Utrecht Avenue.

The City Planning Commission ultimately did not favor a line via Utica Avenue, deciding that it was unnecessary with the Nostrand Avenue Line extension and the lack of available funds. Instead it suggested that the BMT Canarsie Line extension be built instead.

The MCTA would buy 500 high-speed air-conditioned subway cars to operate on the new lines. New and expanded train depots would be built for the new lines and the enlarged subway fleet. The purchase of an additional 500 subway cars was covered in Phase II.

=== Non-subway extensions ===
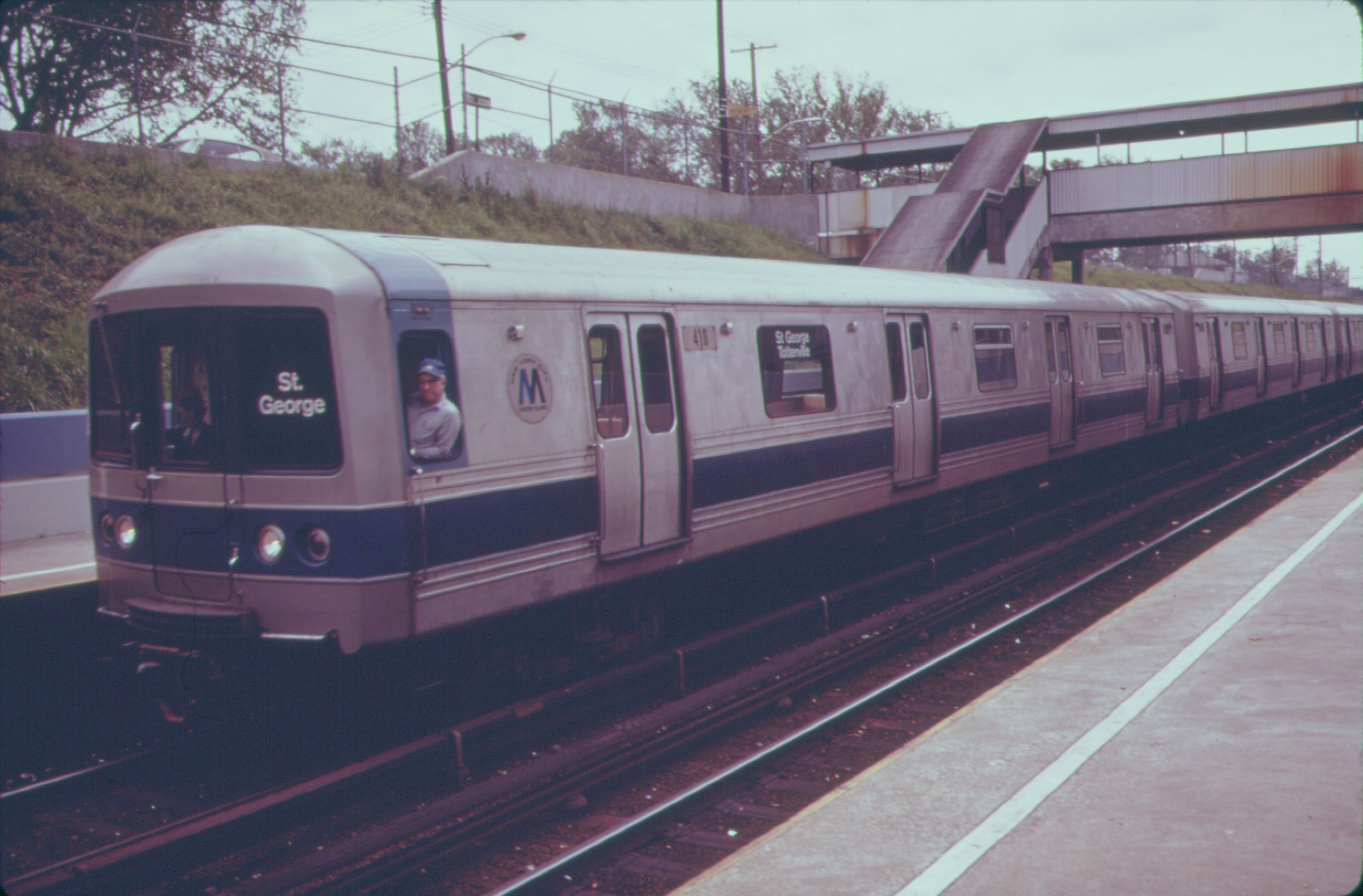
The Staten Island Railway in 1973, operated with then-new R44 cars

As part of the program, the Staten Island Railway would be fully rehabilitated and would also get new rolling stock through Phases I and II.

A new "Metropolitan Transportation Center" at 48th Street and Third Avenue (a precursor to the modern Grand Central Madison) would be built to provide a terminal for the new LIRR line, feeding into the lower of the two decks in the 63rd Street Tunnel. It would also have a terminal for a proposed new high-speed spur to JFK that would run via Jamaica. The terminal would have extended from 47th Street to 50th Street, and the tunnel for the line would extend from 63rd Street to 42nd Street. The portion between 47th Street and 42nd Street was to have been used to store trains during off-peak hours. It would be a transfer point to Grand Central–42nd Street. Access to Grand Central Terminal would be provided through a new north end access point. Construction costs would be offset by building office space above the transportation center. There would be a mezzanine above the four island platforms and eight tracks, which were split evenly across two levels. (This would later be the East Side Access project.) The estimated cost of the project was $341 million, and the MTA applied for $227 million in Federal funds.

The construction of the terminal was opposed by the residents of the Turtle Bay neighborhood, where it was planned to be located in, as it would have changed the character of their neighborhood. Turtle Bay residents wanted the terminal moved to Grand Central. They also disliked the proposed traffic congestion the new terminal would bring. The MTA contended that its studies had shown that Third Avenue was the only feasible place to put the terminal, and there would have been too great of a concentration of rail lines at Grand Central. It concluded that having the LIRR going to Grand Central would further strain the Lexington Avenue Line. If it were on Third Avenue, passengers would have been more inclined to use the Second Avenue Subway, which was partially under construction at the time. On April 16, 1973, a Federal directive directed New York State to consider expanding and modernizing Grand Central before building the new terminal under Third Avenue.

The LIRR would also be electrified to Pinelawn Station on the Ronkonkoma Branch and to Northport Station on the Port Jefferson Branch. The LIRR would get 350 "new high-speed" electric multiple units (EMUs), signal improvements, junction modernizations, high-level platforms, and renovated railcars in addition to the other improvements, because at the time, much of the LIRR was not electrified, nor did its stations have platforms ascending to the height of the train.

The report also called for three commuter rail modernizations. The New Haven Railroad commuter service would get 144 EMUs, as well as signal improvements, high-level platforms, and renovated cars. The Penn Central Railroad would get 130 EMUs, high-level platforms, and electrified trackage north to the Brewster station. The Erie Lackawanna Railroad in New York State would get new equipment, and a study would be conducted to determine whether the ELRR could go to Pennsylvania Station. All of these improvements were to extend into Phase II of the project.

Further away from New York City proper, the MCTA proposed transport hubs at Tarrytown and White Plains in Westchester County; Republic Airport in Suffolk County; and Pearl River, Orangeburg, and Spring Valley in Rockland County. The MCTA also proposed an airport in Westchester.

== Phase II ==
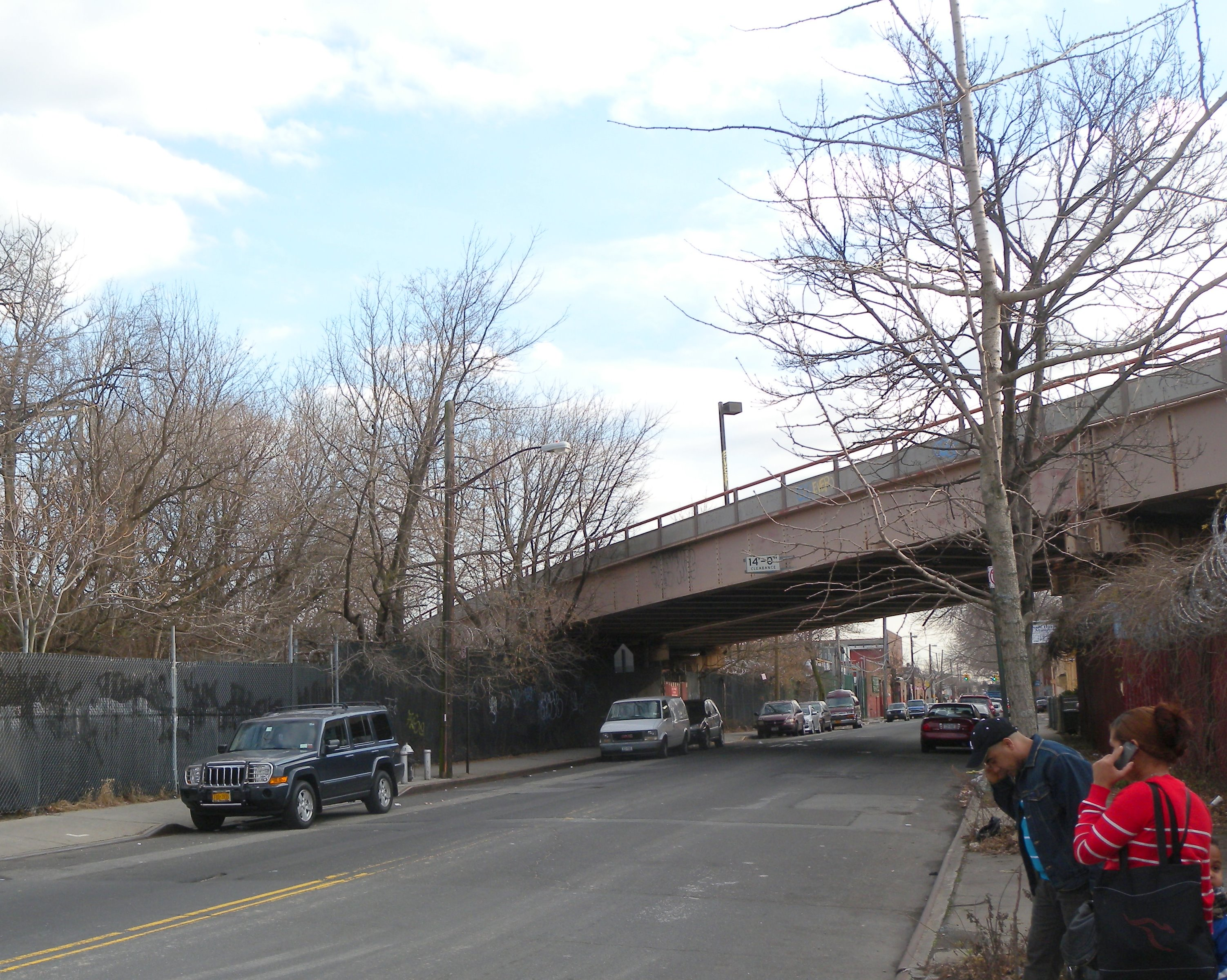
The connection from the elevated BMT Jamaica Line to the underground BMT Archer Avenue Line, built as part of the Program for Action

Phase II would be constructed after Phase I and cost $1.3 billion. Phase II was composed of mostly extensions of existing lines and Phase I-built lines.

Phase II entailed completion of the Second Avenue Subway. The line would go south from 34th Street to the Financial District, going along Second Avenue, Bowery, and Water Street until it reached Whitehall Street at South Ferry. At Grand Street of the Chrystie Street Connection, which had just opened in 1967, the station would be widened to provide cross-platform interchange between Second and Sixth Avenue trains. There was also the possibility of track interchanges, allowing SAS service to go across the Manhattan Bridge to Coney Island. There would also be lines of a new people mover system, called the "Central Business District distribution system", installed under 57th, 48th, 42nd, and 33rd Streets to link transit stations, offices, and attractions in the Midtown CBD. These people mover systems would be an alternative to crosstown bus service to transport riders short distances crosstown.

The lower level of the Archer Avenue Subway would be extended parallel to the LIRR Main Line to 188th Street in Hollis, Queens; the Jamaica El east of 121st Street would be demolished because it was redundant to the new subway. The Northeast Queens LIE line would be lengthened to Springfield Boulevard in Bayside.

The segment of the Third Avenue El in the Bronx would be demolished and replaced with a new subway line under Park Avenue, parallel to the New Haven Line Metro-North tracks. The Park Avenue Subway would connect with the Second Avenue trunk line in the South Bronx, where trains from Park Avenue would merge onto the same tracks as trains from the Dyre Avenue and Pelham spurs. In the same borough, the MCTA would also extend the then now-IND Pelham Line to Co-op City. It would also lengthen the IND Concourse Line to White Plains Road, with a connection to the IRT White Plains Road Line at either Burke Avenue or Gun Hill Road.

New York City railroads would also receive more improvements. One proposed project entailed extending the LIRR Atlantic Branch from Flatbush Avenue in Brooklyn into a new lower Manhattan terminal. A new railroad station at 149th Street in the Bronx, south of the current Yankees–East 153rd Street station, would be built to interchange with subway service. The MCTA would continue to upgrade Penn Central, as well as more airports within Long Island and Dutchess County. Transportation centers would be built in Hicksville, Pine Aire, and Ronkonkoma on Long Island; Brewster in Putnam County; Beacon in Dutchess County; New City and Suffern in Rockland County; and Goshen in Orange County.

== Progress ==
=== 1968–1970: Finalization of plans ===
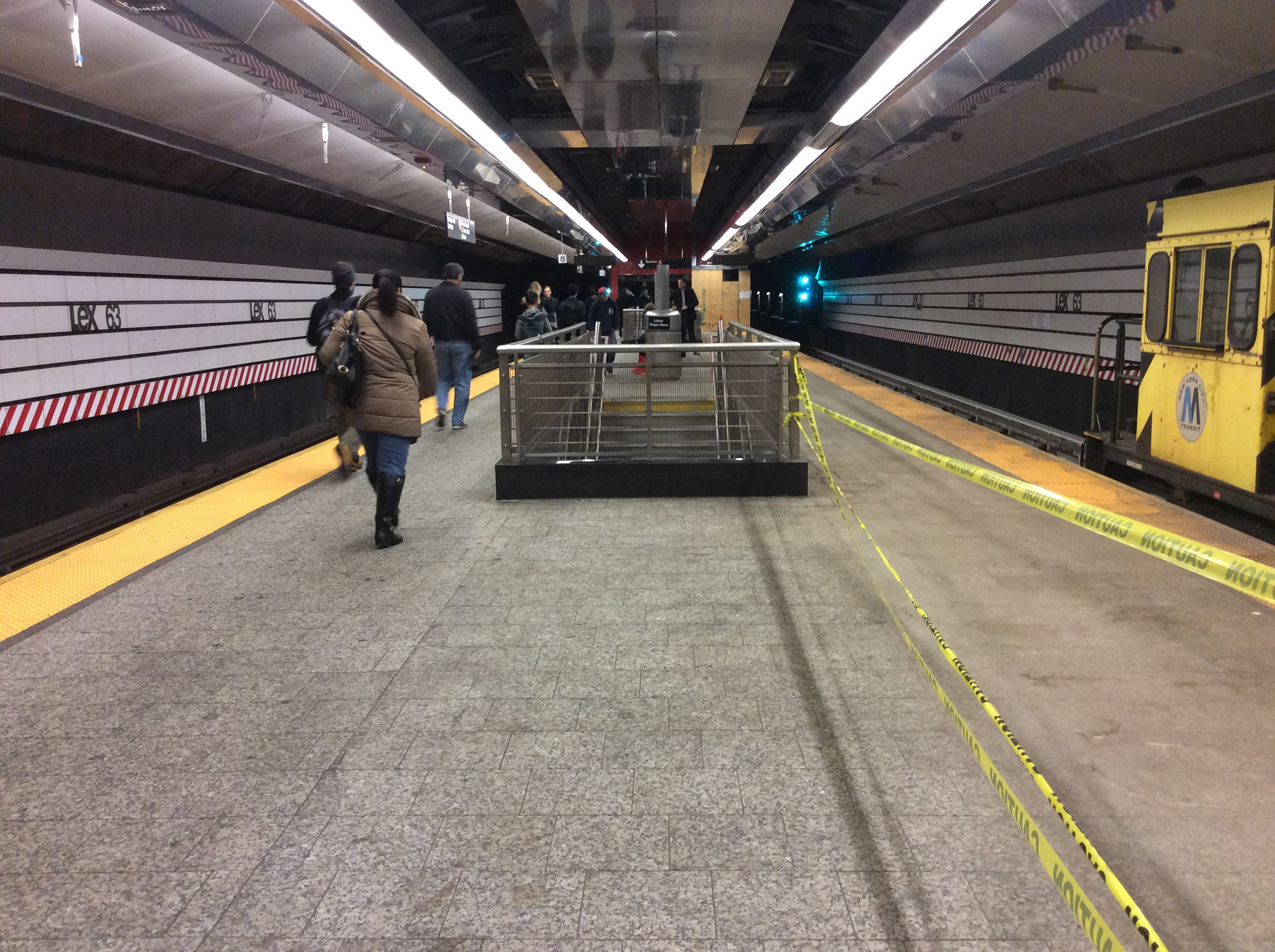
The Lexington Avenue–63rd Street station undergoing renovation, with the original Program for Action-era designs having been replaced

On September 20, 1968, the New York City Board of Estimate and Mayor John Lindsay approved six of the Transit Authority's eight recommended routes at the cost of $1.3 billion. The Second Avenue Subway from 34th Street to East 180th Street, the 63rd Street–Southeast Queens Line, and the Long Island Expressway Line were all approved. The Board of Estimate requested that the following six additional subway routes be built:

- A continuation of the Second Avenue Subway south of 34th Street to Battery Park.
- An extension of the IRT Nostrand Avenue Line from Avenue H to Avenue W.
- A Utica Avenue Line in Brooklyn branching off of the IRT Eastern Parkway Line to Kings Highway.
- A route along the right-of-way of the Harlem Division of Penn Central from 149th Street to the City line to allow for the demolition of the Third Avenue elevated. This line would either connect to the IRT Lexington Avenue Line or the Second Avenue Subway.
- A new crosstown link in Manhattan along 48th Street between First Avenue and Twelfth Avenue.
- The relocation and extension of the BMT Canarsie Line in the median of the proposed Queens Interborough and Cross–Brooklyn expressways to East Flatbush.

On June 3, 1969, the Utica Avenue Line was approved by the Board of Estimate with a slight modification. Instead of ending at Kings Highway, it would end at Flatbush Avenue and Avenue U, with borings underway in 1970. Studies for the midtown people mover commenced in November 1969.

=== 1969–1975: Progress ===
On November 24, 1969, the 63rd Street line commenced construction, with tunnel segments being dug westward from Queens and in both directions from Roosevelt Island. The bi-level tunnel would have the subway on the top level and LIRR trains on the lower level. The line under Central Park connecting the line to the IND Sixth Avenue Line and the BMT Broadway Line began construction in summer 1971. A groundbreaking ceremony for the Second Avenue Subway was held on October 27, 1972, and construction began shortly thereafter at Second Avenue and 103rd Street. Construction costs for the Second Avenue Line were pegged at $1 billion, rising to $1.3 billion a year later. Three tunnels and six shafts were built for the Second Avenue and 63rd Street Lines at a cost of $1.23 billion. The four prefabricated segments of the double-deck, 3,140-foot (960 m) 63rd Street tunnel were connected on October 10, 1972. The sections of the 63rd Street line that connected to the existing Broadway and Sixth Avenue Lines were holed through on October 11, 1973. Construction on the section of the 63rd Street line between 5th Avenue and Park Avenue began in August 1974.

Plans for the single-track Queens Super Express Bypass for the IND Queens Boulevard Line had been doubled to two tracks in 1972. The BMT Jamaica Line from 121st Street to 168th Street would be demolished to make room for a connection to the lower level of the Archer Avenue Line, which extended east to Jamaica Center–Parsons/Archer. A year later, a final design for the Northeast Queens LIE line was published, while other final engineering for the Southeast Queens line was imminent. In the summer of 1972, ground was broken on the Southeast Queens Line along Archer Avenue to 147th Place. Two southeast Brooklyn IRT routes—the IRT Nostrand Avenue Line extension to Avenue W, as well as an IRT Eastern Parkway Line branch under Utica Avenue to Avenue U—were being designed. The MCTA, which was by now renamed the MTA, were rerouting the proposed IRT Pelham Line branch to Co-op City via New Haven Railroad right of way.

In 1973, the MTA published a progress report on the Program for Action. The report said that, overall, "Almost all of the projects are well ahead of the goal recommended five years ago. Despite technical setbacks, legal roadblocks, administrative frustrations and limited funding, progress has been substantial." In total, eight lines were under design and three were undergoing active construction. The MTA was studying the 42nd Street, 48th Street, and 57th Street people movers as well. The Second Avenue Subway, 63rd Street Line, Northeast Queens Line, and Super-Express Bypass were considered to be part of a highly prioritized "Group A", which would open between 1980 and 1983. A lower-priority "Group B" comprised the remaining projects. On the downside, these projects had gotten so expensive that, after announcing the $2.5 billion projected cost for the extensions in 1973, the MTA stopped publishing cost estimates.

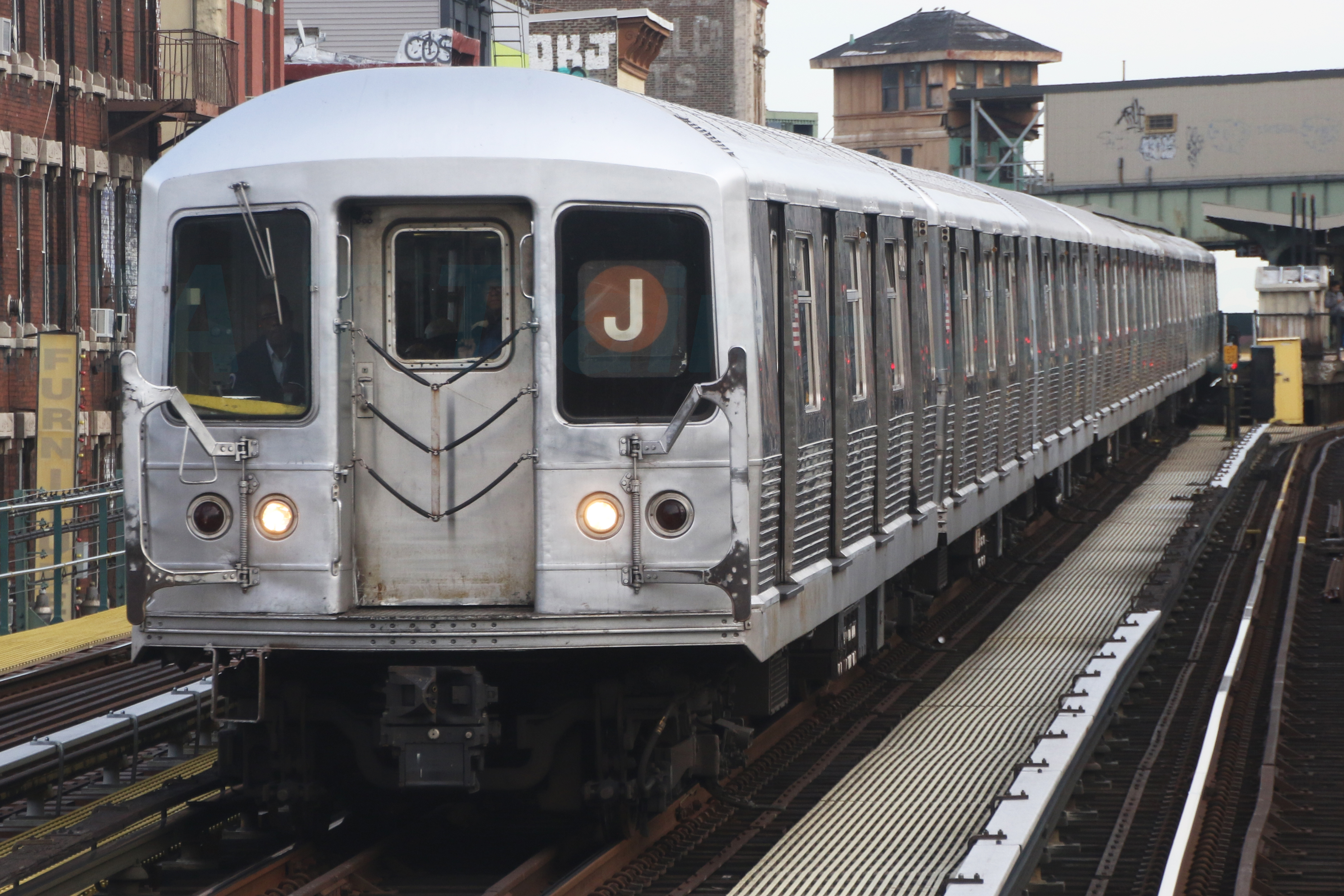
R42 subway cars, which were delivered as part of the Program for Action

The railcar replacement programs on the MTA's commuter railways also progressed significantly. In 1970, the MTA ordered 144 high-speed "Cosmopolitan" railcars for Penn Central's New Haven Line, and the next year, it ordered 200 more cars for Penn Central's Hudson and Harlem Lines. The first new cars were delivered in September 1971. The subway and LIRR also saw deliveries of more than 600 new cars apiece. For the subway, 800 new R40 and R42 subway cars were delivered between 1968 and 1973, and the number of New York City Subway cars in need of replacement had nearly halved, from 1,883 to 956. The first R44 cars had been delivered in 1971 in anticipation for use on the SAS.

The planned extensions and realignment of the Canarsie Line were canceled in 1973, due to community opposition against the proposed expressways that the line would have been built along with. Later that year, the LIE line was canceled because New York state voters had declined a $3.5 billion bond measure that would have paid for five subway extensions, including the LIE line. This was the second time that voters declined a bond issue to finance this extension, with the first being on November 2, 1971, for $2.5 billion. The defeat set back the construction of subway construction projects, including the Lower East Side Loop, the Utica Avenue Line, the Nostrand Avenue extension, the Jamaica Avenue Line, and the Northeast Queens Line. The 1973 bond issue, in addition to financing the LIE line, would have also paid for an extension of the IRT Dyre Avenue Line to Co-op City, an extension of the IND Queens Boulevard Line to Hillside Avenue and Springfield Boulevard, a joint LIRR/subway extension from the Atlantic Avenue LIRR terminal to Lower Manhattan, and a branch of the Queens Boulevard Line at 63rd Drive to the Rockaways via the abandoned Rockaway Beach Branch. The double fare was removed on September 1, 1975, although this was not part of the bond issue.

The MTA still believed that many other projects would still be built. By November 1974, the MTA projected a 1981 opening date for the Archer Avenue Line to Springfield Boulevard, as well as a 1982 opening date for the 63rd Street Line and for the SAS from 34th Street to 125th Street. In 1983, the Queens Super Express Bypass was to open, and in the same year, the Bronx extension of the SAS and the BMT Jamaica Line reroute to Archer Avenue would open. The MTA thought that the SAS's southern extension to Whitehall Street would open by 1988, and that by 1993, the Utica Avenue, Nostrand Avenue, and LIE subway lines and the LIRR East Side Access would all open. Now that several extensions had been canceled, the plan was to build 40 miles (64 km) of new track miles. Preliminary planning for the Metropolitan Transportation Center had been completed by January 1975. Due to continued opposition to the Transportation Center, a "Grand Central Alternative" was published in September 1976. It called for the LIRR to use Grand Central Terminal's lower level instead. The MTA's board of directors voted to use Grand Central as the terminal for the proposed LIRR route in 1977.

=== 1975–1989: Fiscal crisis, delays, and plan reduction ===
While the Program for Action was ongoing, the MTA experienced growing fiscal deficits, which led to gradually increasing fare prices as well as a declining quality of service. The projects ran out of funding due to the 1975–1976 New York City fiscal crisis, along with the fact that the MTA did not have a consistent funding source (its five-year Capital Programs were implemented in 1982 due to further decline in the subway after 1975–1976). Expected to be completed by the mid-1970s and early 1980s, lines for the Program for Action had to be reduced or canceled altogether due to the crisis. Because of the fiscal crisis, the Archer Avenue and 63rd Street lines, the only two complete lines to be built under the program, were truncated and delayed, and there were plans to abandon the expansions altogether.

The MTA's proposed "40 miles of new subway" in Queens was reduced to 15 miles (24 km) of tracks, and at the end, only three lines were even constructed: the 63rd Street Line, Archer Avenue Line, and portions of the SAS. Construction for the Second Avenue Line was halted indefinitely in 1975, (Note: At the time, there was no plan for completion, though the first phase of the line ultimately opened in 2017.) but when the United States government ceased to fund the two remaining projects ten years later, neither of them had been completed. The Archer Avenue Line was opened in 1988 and the 63rd Street Line was also opened one year later; both lines, which had three stations each, were scaled-down versions of their original plans. However, construction on the SAS ceased in 1975. The eastern Jamaica elevated in Queens and the entire Third Avenue elevated in the Bronx were closed by 1985; the Jamaica el was only partially replaced by Archer Avenue service, while no rapid transit facilities were ever built to replace Third Avenue service.

==== 63rd Street subway ====
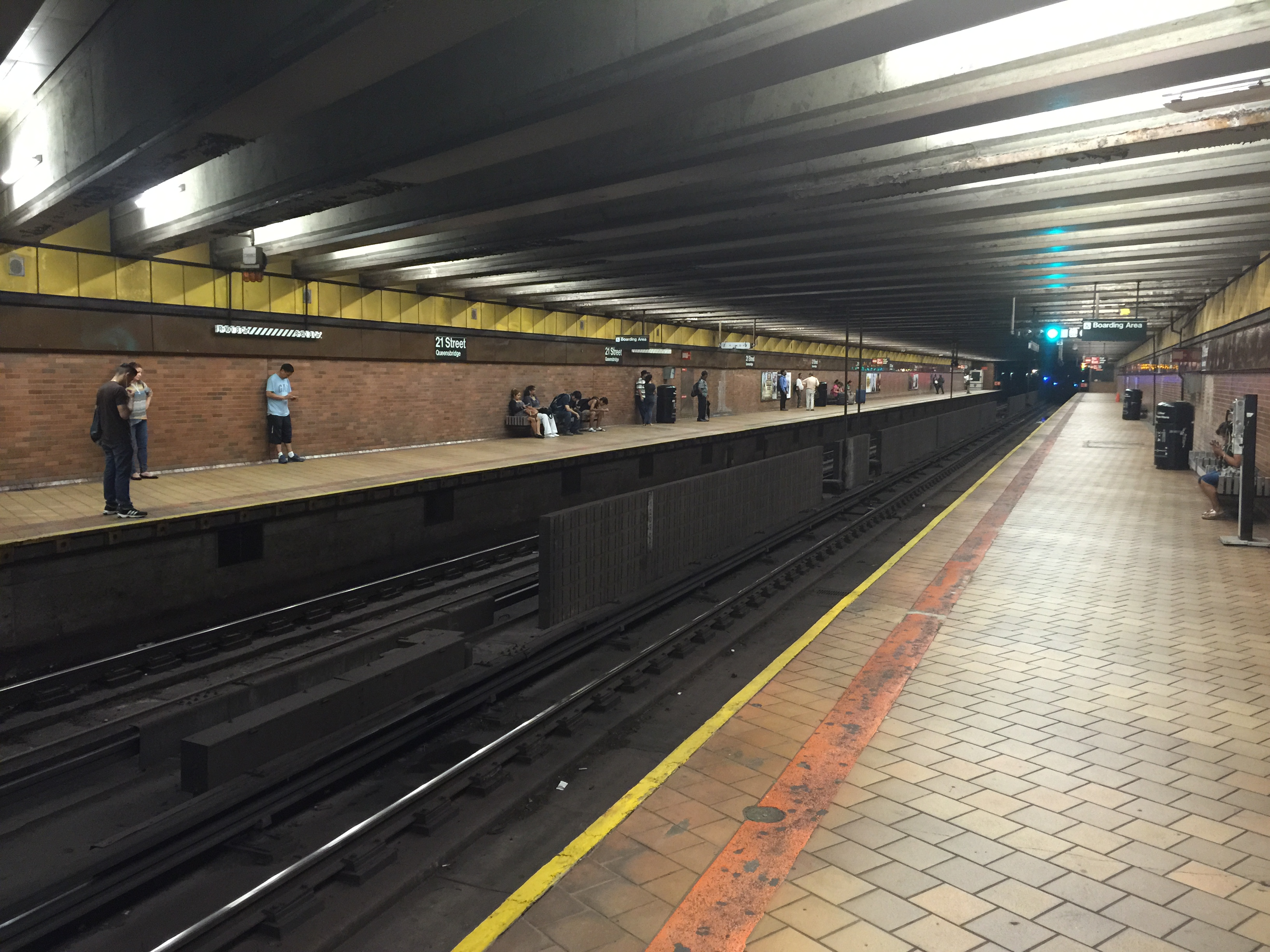
The 63rd Street Line at 21st Street–Queensbridge

By the summer of 1976, the 63rd Street subway, which would comprise part of the Southeast Queens Line "from Central Park to Jamaica via the new 63rd Street tunnel," was being delayed to 1987–1988, since the planned 5.8-mile super express bypass had yet to begin construction. The authority proposed a new station at Northern Boulevard, adjacent to the existing Queens Plaza station, with transfers between mainline Queens Boulevard trains and 63rd Street/super-express trains, to be opened by 1983 or 1984. The Manhattan section of that line was completed that year.

The New York Times reported in May 1978 that the expansion had been reduced to 1/5 of its original length, saying, "The line costs $100,000 a foot, will be very short and will serve only a modest number of riders." The article now noted that the Queens super-express had been deferred "to 1988 at the earliest," and the only sections in progress were the 63rd Street Line to Northern Boulevard, and "a small piece along Archer Avenue." The opening date of the 63rd Street subway to Jamaica was projected for 1985. As of early 1979, commuters could still see signs proclaiming 40 miles of new extensions, even though 25 of these miles were no longer being planned. By 1980, the MTA considered stopping the project and diverting the money to existing subway infrastructure, which was heavily vandalized, severely deteriorating, and devoid of riders. At this point, the 63rd Street subway was to be completed in 1985, with the bypass to be completed later. In 1981, due to lack of money, all bidding on new subway and bus projects for the MTA was suspended, except for the already-built portions of the 63rd Street and Archer Avenue lines. The MTA gave approval for the 63rd Street Line to be completed from Manhattan to Long Island City.

In the spring of 1983, the MTA took a fresh look at the tunnel, considering five possibilities. The proposals ranged from leaving it as-is, with the line's terminus in Long Island City, to the original 1960s plan to connect the 63rd Street Line to the LIRR Main Line, the cost of which was now estimated at $1 billion. At 21st Street–Queensbridge, usage estimates for that station in 1984 were 220 passengers per hour unless a connection was made to the rest of the system. The MTA was studying four options for making this line more useful:

1. The Queens Express Bypass: extending the line along the LIRR Main Line to Forest Hills–71st Avenue. It would be completed in 1998 and cost $931 million. This was the original plan for this line proposed in the 1968 Program for Action. This was also the only option that the MTA felt that would add passenger and train capacity to the E and F express services. At a proposed station at Northern Boulevard, a transfer concourse to Queens Plaza would have allowed transfers between local, express, and bypass trains.
2. Feeding the line into the IND Queens Boulevard Line's local tracks under Northern Boulevard. This alternative would be completed the earliest, by 1993, ran the shortest distance (1,500 feet between 29th Street and Northern Boulevard), and was the cheapest, at a cost of $222 million. However, the E and F services in Queens, the most crowded in the system, would not see any added capacity from such a connection, while the 63rd Street line would run at only 1/3 of its total capacity, in addition to reducing the viability of future extensions to the line. It would also require the G service to terminate at Court Square instead of operating local on the Queens Boulevard Line. An option similar to this was ultimately chosen, and the F was rerouted through the line to reduce congestion, with G service eliminated north of Court Square (see § Service changes).
3. Extending the line through the Sunnyside Yard and onto the LIRR Montauk Branch, running directly to the lower level of the Archer Avenue Line in Jamaica. The Montauk Branch in Queens is currently used for freight service, last seeing passenger service in 1998, and would have been rebuilt and electrified. The Montauk line would merge with the BMT Jamaica elevated at Lefferts Boulevard just west of 121st Street, using the BMT approach to the Archer Avenue subway. The Jamaica El would be truncated to Crescent Street in Brooklyn and replaced by bus service. New stations would be built at Thomson Avenue within the Sunnyside Yard, and at Fresh Pond Road (the site of the former Fresh Pond station) and Woodhaven Boulevard (at the former Ridgewood station site) along the Montauk Branch. The now-closed Richmond Hill station on the Montauk Branch would be renovated and lengthened for subway service. The LIRR would have exclusive use of the tracks during overnight hours for freight service. This $594 million option would be open by 1997, but people living around the Montauk Branch opposed the proposal due to fears of increased traffic and danger from the Montauk Branch's multiple grade crossings, though plans called for new overpasses and access roads to eliminate these crossings.
4. Extending the line to a new subway/LIRR terminal at Thomson Avenue within the Sunnyside Yard, with a walking transfer to the Queens Plaza station, and a transfer to a new LIRR route that would go to Rosedale and Queens Village via the Montauk Branch. The LIRR would be rebuilt, grade-separated, and electrified. The Richmond Hill station would be renovated for additional LIRR service, while the Hollis and Queens Village stations would be converted from side platform stations to island platform configurations. This $488 million option, to be completed by 1995, was also opposed by people living along the Montauk Branch.

The suburban Glendale, Ridgewood and Middle Village communities in central Queens strongly opposed any proposals involving the Montauk Branch, which ran through their neighborhood. The ultimately agreed-on plan was to connect the tunnel to the tracks of the IND Queens Boulevard Line, at a cost of $222 million, and a timetable of at least eight years. It was estimated that the project would attract 16,500 passengers per hour. This was the cheapest plan besides doing nothing. The MTA board approved this plan on December 14, 1984. The section of the line up to Long Island City was projected to open by the end of 1985.

By 1985, the line's construction had cost $800 million, and the line would need another $200 million of fixes in order to make it usable. The MTA considered abandoning the line, but because the tunnel was examined and found to be sturdy, the MTA decided to add a single station in Queens: the 21st Street–Queensbridge station in Long Island City. However, the 63rd Street Subway's eastern Queens extension was no longer being planned, although a bellmouth was built at the end of the tunnel, past 21st Street–Queensbridge, as a provision for the express bypass.

None of the options proposed in 1984 were acted upon. The 63rd Street Line was opened in 1989 after more than a decade of delays, its terminal station at 21st Street, rendering the once-grandiosely-planned line a "useless subway to nowhere". In 1990, a modified version of the Queens Boulevard Line connection was selected, with connections to both the local and express Queens Boulevard tracks. In 2001, the 63rd Street Connection was completed between the Queens stub of the 63rd Street Line at 29th Street and the 36th Street station of the Queens Boulevard line, allowing service from both Queens Boulevard local and express trains to serve the line. The connection cost $645 million and resulted in several major service changes (see § Service changes). Under the 1985 connector plans, the B, N (which operated on Queens Boulevard until 1987), Q (then called the QB), and a resurrected K Sixth Avenue route, were among the routes to be extended along Queens Boulevard or a bypass route via 63rd Street, while the F would have retained its routing via 53rd Street. As part of the connector, a new bellmouth and additional tail tracks were built to facilitate a future line such as the bypass options or construction of a transfer station.

==== 63rd Street LIRR line ====
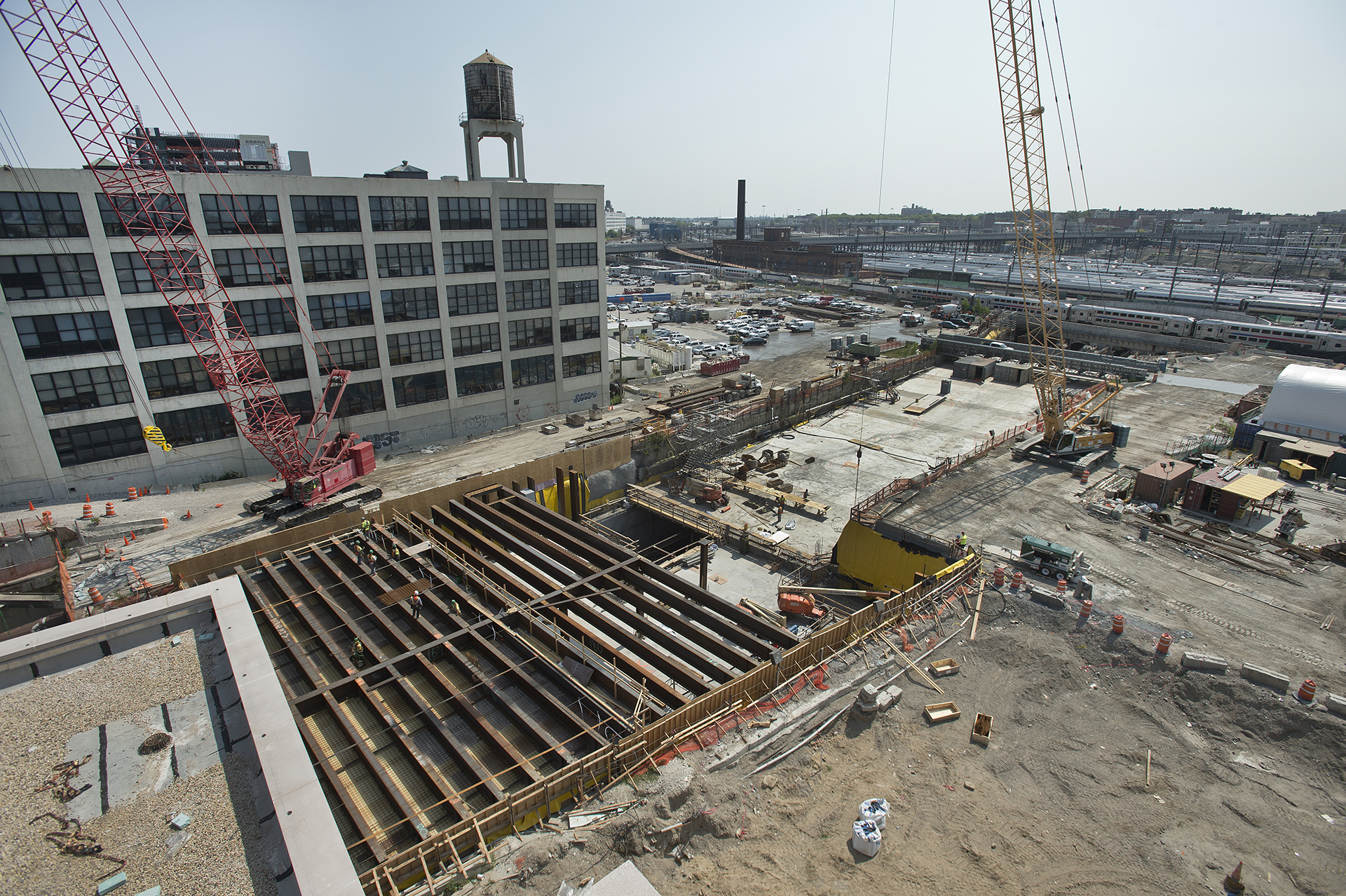
The east end of the 63rd Street Tunnel in Long Island City, under construction for East Side Access. Also here is a bellmouth for future subway service

Construction on the lower level of the 63rd Street tunnel, which was to be used by LIRR trains from and to the planned Metropolitan Transportation Center, was completed along with the upper subway level. However, the LIRR project had been canceled long before the tunnel was completed. The New York Times noted that the lower level of the 63rd Street tunnel was still under construction by 1976, even though "officials knew that the tunnel would never be used." (Note: At the time, there was no plan for completion. The East Side Access project, which began in 2007 and was completed in 2023, utilizes this tunnel to provide LIRR service to Grand Central Madison.) Richard Ravitch, the MTA chairman, said that to stop the work was impossible or so costly as to make it impractical subsequent to the construction of the subway portion." The 8,600 feet (2,600 m) "tunnel to nowhere" was completed "largely for structural reasons — to support the subway tunnel above."

==== Archer Avenue Subway ====
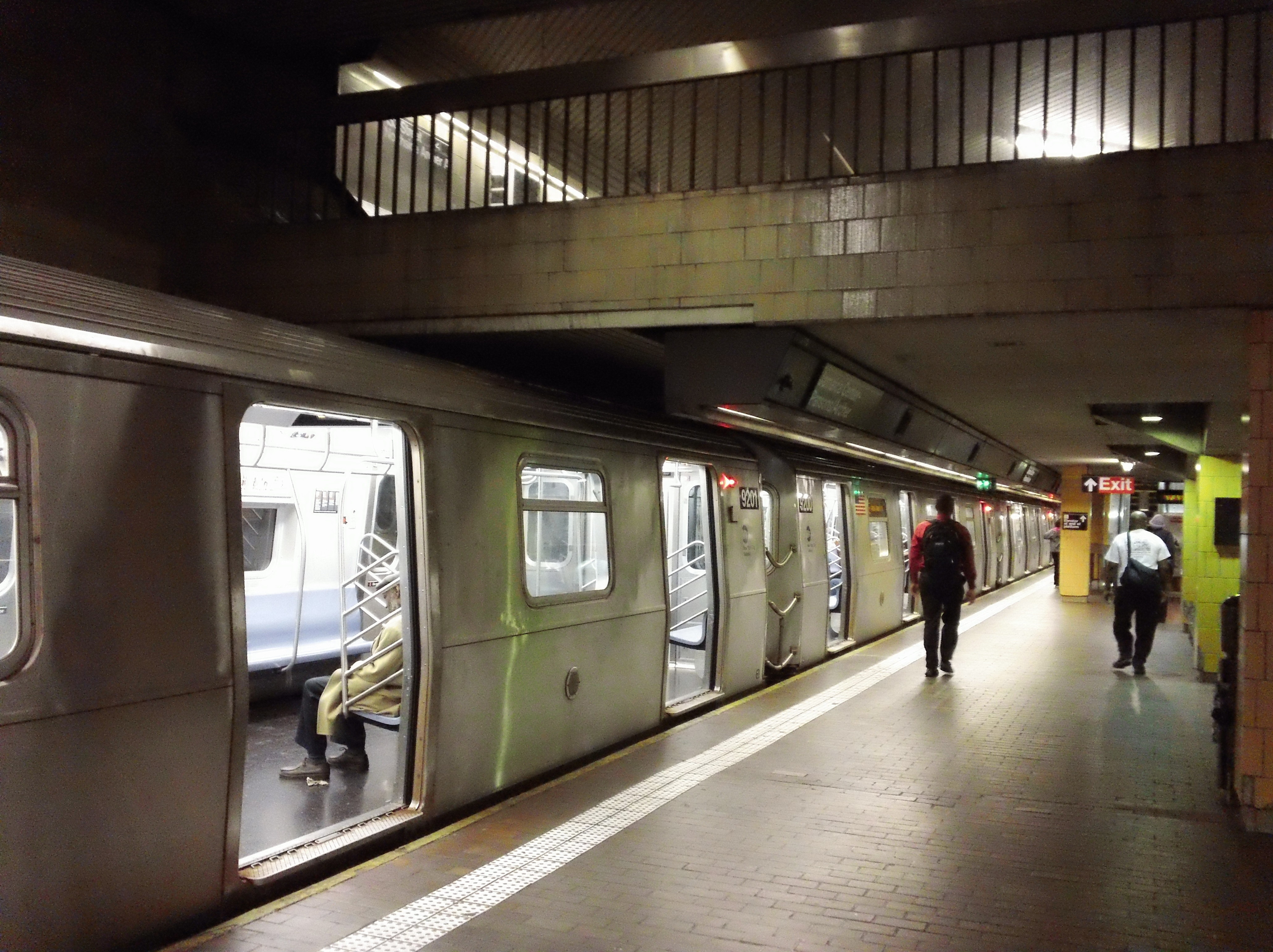
The Jamaica Center station of the Archer Avenue Lines

The Archer Avenue Subway was initially conceived as part of the 63rd Street Line and planned "Southeast Queens" subway, as well as the planned Jamaica El replacement. By May 1976, the Archer Avenue segment was projected to be completed in 1983. However, New York City became insolvent during the 1975–1976 fiscal crisis, and in October 1980, officials considered stopping this project as well and diverting the money to mend existing infrastructure. At this point the Archer Avenue project was projected for completion in 1984. In 1981, when all bids for new projects were suspended except for the two Program for Action lines, the MTA gave approval for the Archer Avenue Line to be completed to help improve Jamaica's economy.

The line was also delayed to disagreements over the quality of concrete and the leakage of water into the tunnels, the speed of construction, and the federal Urban Mass Transportation Administration's reluctance to provide funding for the line based on the tunnels' condition. Still, construction was completed a year ahead of schedule, in 1983. Due to the city's fiscal crisis, the planned subway line was truncated to Jamaica Center–Parsons/Archer, with provisions existing for the planned extension of the upper level along the LIRR Locust Manor right-of-way. The line opened on December 11, 1988, at a cost of nearly five times its original budget, and severely cut back to a length of 2 miles (3 km). Since the line had been abridged to Jamaica Center, the "modern terminal" at Springfield Gardens had not been built, severely reducing train capacity on both levels to twelve trains per hour.

==== Second Avenue Subway ====
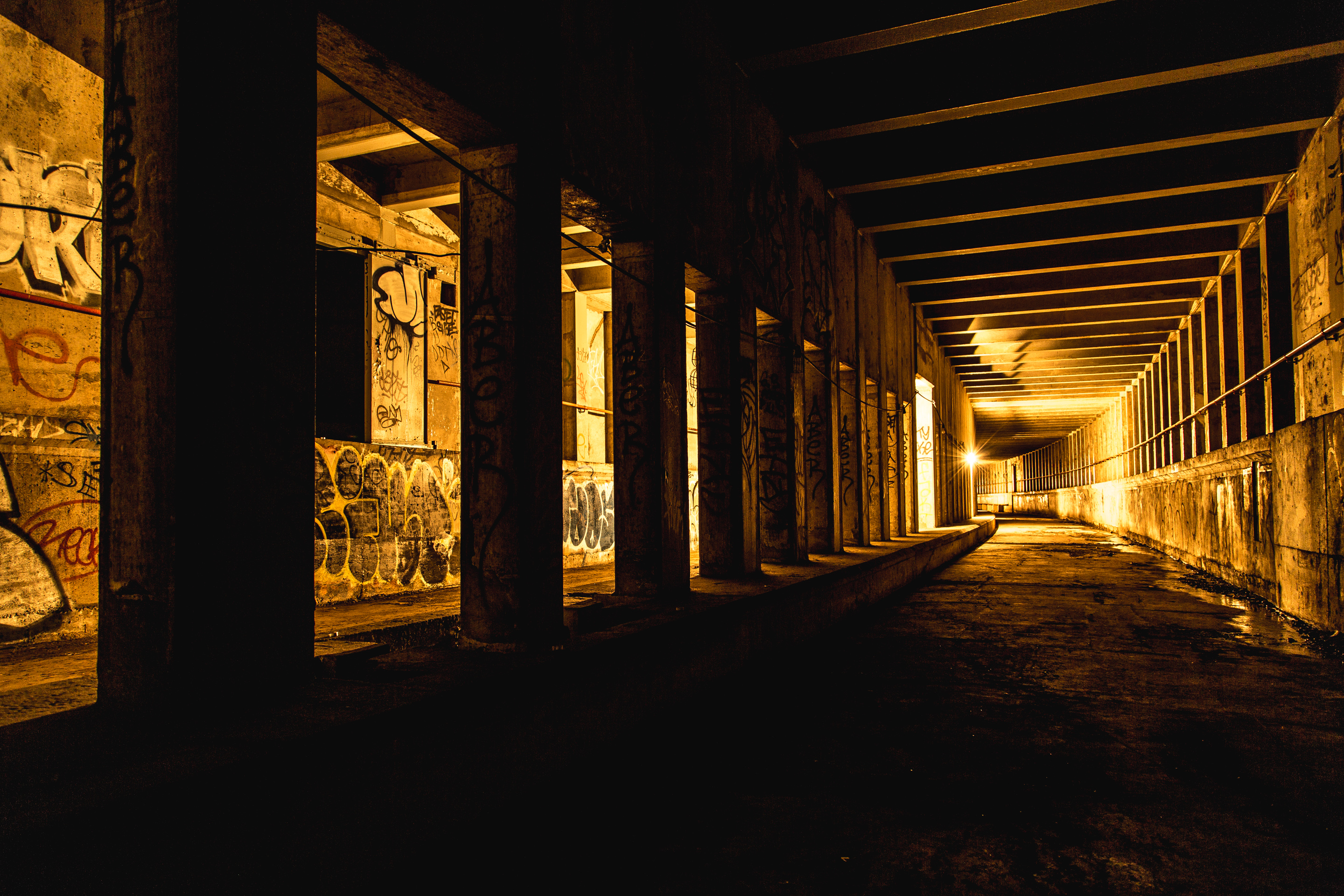
An abandoned Second Avenue Subway tunnel

The Second Avenue Subway was supposed to be the flagship project of the Program for Action. In a 1964 report, it was given top priority on a list of projects to be completed. Prior attempts to build the line had failed, and the city wished to have a Second Avenue subway line to alleviate overcrowding on the IRT Lexington Avenue Line. Twenty-two blocks of tunnel were ultimately constructed. Seven additional blocks in the East Village were prepared for tunneling operations, but never excavated.

However, the 1975–1976 fiscal crisis, combined with the massive outflow of city residents to the suburbs, led to the MTA and the city having no funds to complete the Second Avenue Line. Construction of the subway was halted on September 29, 1975, with only three sections of tunnel having been completed, excluding the Chrystie Street Connection and the connection to the BMT 63rd Street Line. By 1978, when the New York City Subway was at its lowest point in its existence, State Comptroller Arthur Levitt stated that there were no plans to finish the line. Of this failure to complete construction, Gene Russianoff, an advocate for subway riders since 1981, stated: "It's the most famous thing that's never been built in New York City, so everyone is skeptical and rightly so. It's much-promised and never delivered."

==== JFK Airport rail link ====
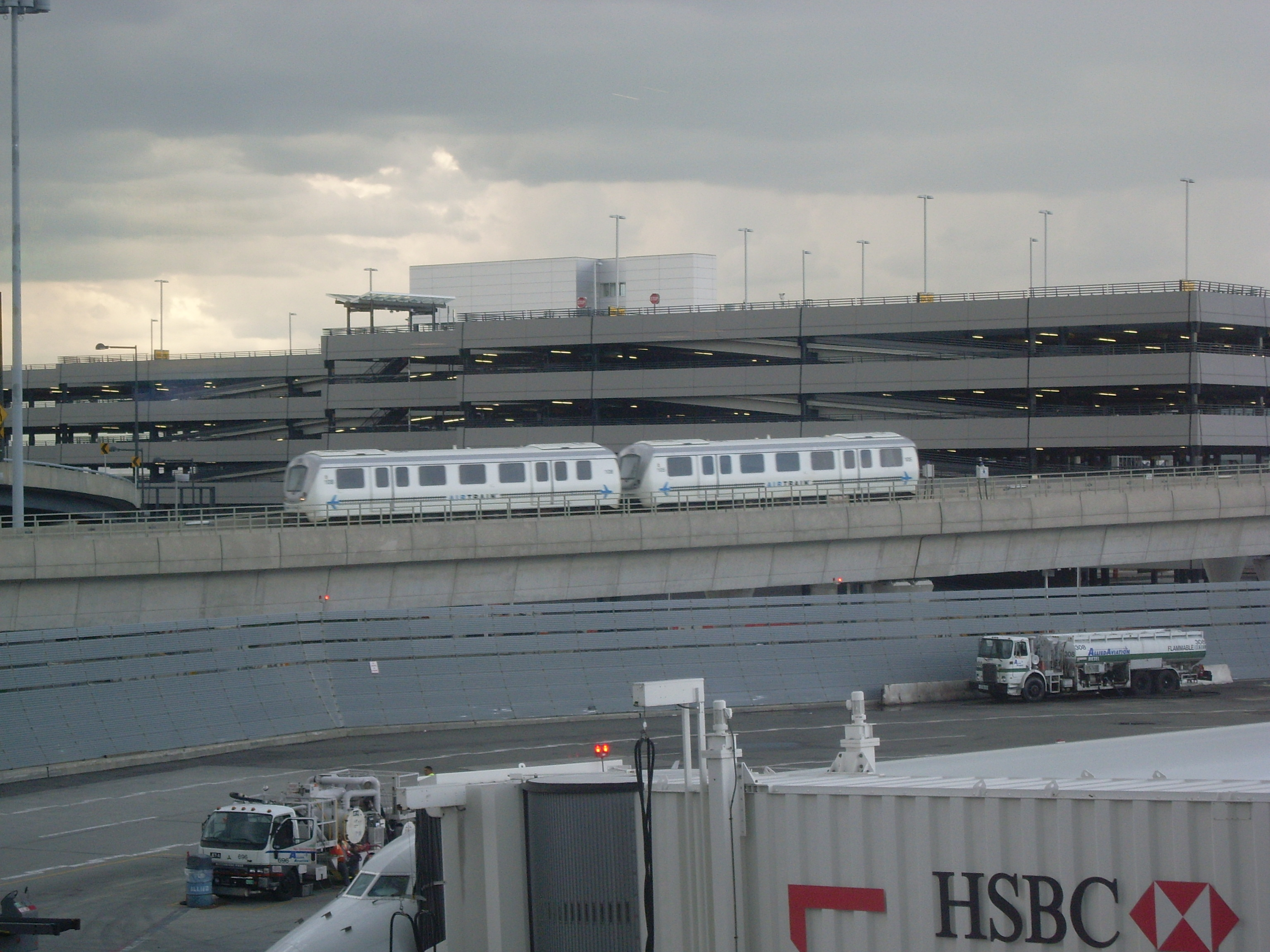
Two-car AirTrain seen from Terminal 4

The LIRR rail link to JFK Airport, as originally planned, would have been built during the Program for Action's second phase. It entailed extending the LIRR through the 63rd Street Tunnel's lower level before tending at "Metropolitan Transportation Center" below Third Avenue and 48th Street. William J. Ronan—the chairman of the Port Authority of New York and New Jersey, which operates Newark, LaGuardia, and JFK Airports in the New York City area—suggested bringing the link to Penn Station instead. The site of the proposed Manhattan terminal was moved to 33rd Street, next to Penn Station, in 1969.

Many Rockaway and central Queens residents wanted the link to run along the disused Rockaway Beach Branch, rather than along the Van Wyck, so that Rockaway residents could also use the route to travel to Manhattan quickly. The New York City Board of Estimate approved the revised plan for a link between Penn Station and JFK via the Rockaway Beach Branch in 1969. Later during the planning process, a Woodhaven Junction stop was added along the link's route in response to requests by residents of the Woodhaven neighborhood.

The $210 million LIRR plan faced much criticism, and one section in central Queens attracted heavy opposition. New York State Senator John J. Santucci, representing the Rockaways, raised concerns that a 2,900-foot (880 m) tunnel for the link, which would connect to the Rockaway Beach Branch, would require razing part of Forest Park, a plan his constituents opposed. Santucci said the link's construction would irreversibly destroy part of the park, destroying a community landmark by "stripping away the resources of the people for the luxury of the few". In October 1974, the president of the Hammel Holland Seaside Civic Association wrote to Mayor Abraham Beame, "It is our earnest plea to you that your decision on this rape of Forest Park be rescinded." The association's president added that although it would be cost-ineffective to create a premium service to JFK Airport, the Rockaway Beach Branch should still be reactivated for local passengers.

In April 1976, Port Authority Chairman Ronan said that the link was "not feasible" due to the economic downturn and a corresponding decrease in air traffic. In 1978, after the Program for Action had been mostly scrapped, independent organizations pushed for the construction of a direct subway link from the IND Rockaway Line south of Aqueduct–North Conduit Avenue. A later study for a dedicated two-lane rapid transit bus line to JFK along the Rockaway Beach Branch, called the "Transitway", was released in 1982. The line would also host taxis, limousines, and vans going to the airport. The Port Authority scrapped the plan the following year in the face of near-unanimous opposition from the communities along the route. Following the failure of the JFK rail link, the MTA started operating the JFK Express (advertised as "The Train to The Plane"), a premium-fare New York City Subway service that connected Midtown Manhattan to the IND Rockaway Line's Howard Beach–JFK Airport station. It ran from 1978 until 1990, transporting passengers to the Howard Beach station, where passengers would ride a shuttle bus to the airport.

In 1987, the Port Authority brought up a similar proposal to connect a new five-story, $500 million transportation center with all of the airport's terminals, in conjunction with the under-construction JFK Expressway. The two-track system would be able to accommodate 2,000 riders an hour and would also travel to another new structure, a $450 million terminal proposed by Pan American World Airways. During the previous year, all three airports had experienced an unusually large increase in passenger counts and were now accommodating one-and-a-half to two times their design capacity. Architect Henry N. Cobb of Pei Cobb Freed & Partners created a design for the terminal and the projected people mover system. However, the Port Authority withdrew its plans for the large transport hub in 1990 after objections from the airlines, which could not pay for the costly renovation.

=== 1990–present: Spinoff projects ===
==== 63rd Street LIRR line ====
With the city's economic and budgetary recovery in the 1990s, plans had resurfaced to bring LIRR service to East Midtown. In 1995, officials began the planning process for such a link. The LIRR was the busiest commuter railroad in the United States, with an average of 269,400 passengers each weekday in 1999. In 1999, the MTA proposed a $17 billion five-year capital budget. This budget included a $1.6 billion LIRR connection to Grand Central Terminal, called East Side Access, as well as several subway extensions. After the September 11, 2001, attacks, the MTA announced plans to accelerate the timeline for constructing East Side Access. In 2002, Congress passed a bill that allocated $132 million for infrastructure projects in New York State, of which $14.7 million was to go toward funding East Side Access. Approval of a final design for East Side Access was granted in 2002.

Funding for MTA capital projects such as East Side Access, the Second Avenue Subway, and the 7 Subway Extension were included in the Rebuild and Renew Transportation Bond Act of 2005. Voters ultimately approved the bond issue, and East Side Access was instigated in December 2006. The East Side Access project constructed a new LIRR terminal beneath the current Grand Central Terminal, using new tunnels to connect to the 63rd Street tunnel's lower level. As of April 2018, the MTA was looking to start passenger service in December 2022, at an estimated cost of $11.1 billion.

==== Second Avenue Subway ====
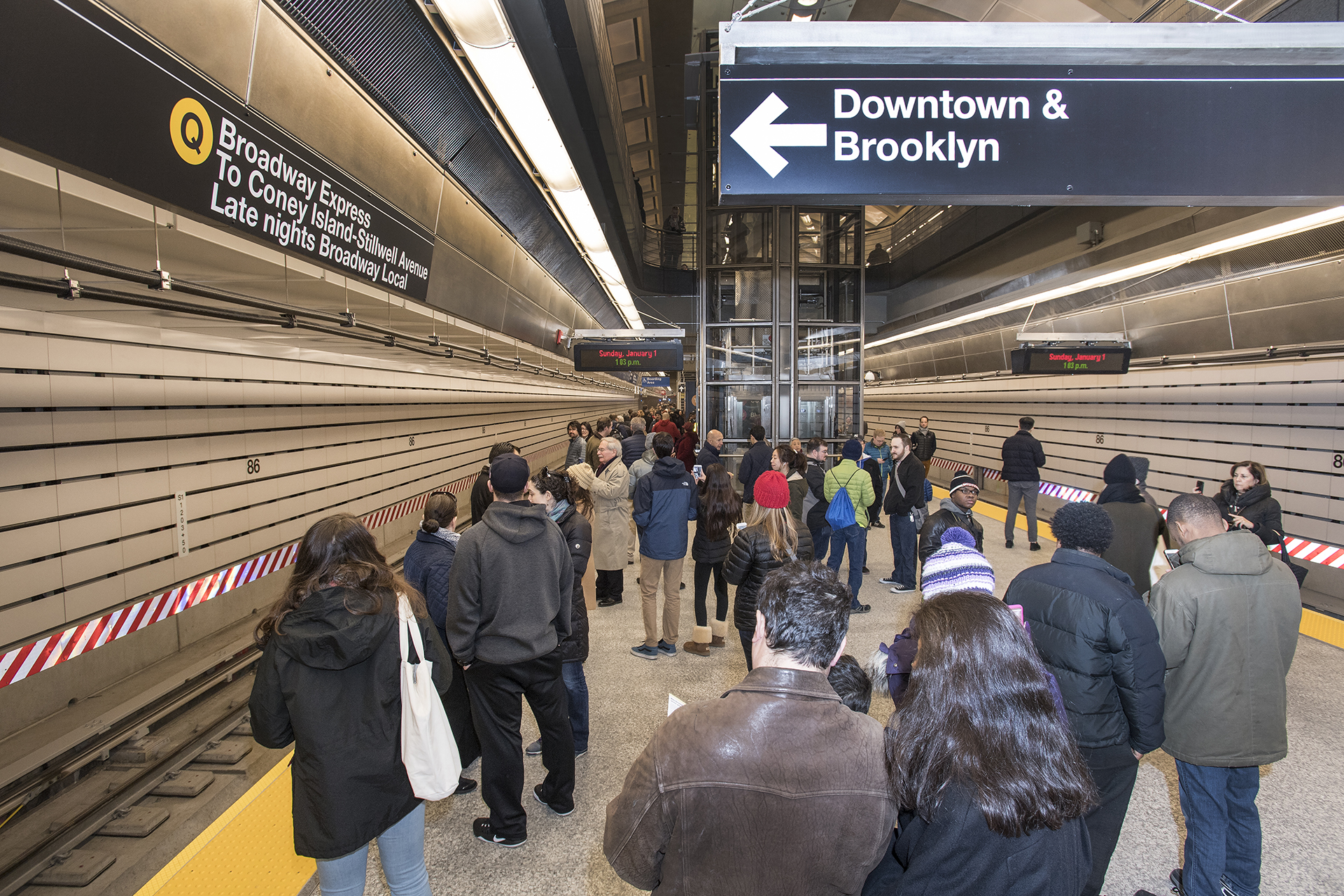
The partially completed Second Avenue Subway, seen at 86th Street on opening day in 2017

The city's economic and budgetary recovery also led to a revival of efforts to complete construction of the Second Avenue Subway. In 1991, then-New York Governor Mario Cuomo allocated $22 million to renew planning and design efforts for the Second Avenue line, but two years later, the MTA, facing budget cuts, removed these funds from its capital budget. Due in part to strong public support, the MTA Board committed in April 2000 to building a full-length subway line along the East Side, from East Harlem to Lower Manhattan. In May 2000, the MTA Capital Program Review Board approved the MTA's 2000–2004 Capital Program, which allocated $1.05 billion for the construction of the Second Avenue Subway. The MTA's final environmental impact statement (FEIS) was approved in April 2004; this latest proposal is for a two-track line from 125th Street and Lexington Avenue in Harlem, down Second Avenue to Hanover Square in the Financial District.

The same 2005 bond that funded East Side Access also provided funding to complete the Second Avenue Subway. Construction on the new project commenced in 2007, and the first phase from 72nd Street to 96th Street, on the Upper East Side, opened on January 1, 2017. The planned Phase 2, to East Harlem, will utilize the sections of tunnel north of 96th Street that were built in the 1970s. Under a plan approved in 2016, Phase 2 of the Second Avenue Subway would receive funding by 2020, and open between 2027 and 2029.

==== JFK Airport rail link ====
By the 1990s, there was demand for a direct link between Midtown Manhattan and JFK Airport. In 1990, the MTA proposed a $1.6 billion rail link to LaGuardia and JFK airports, which would be funded jointly by agencies in the federal, state, and city governments. The rail line was to begin in Midtown Manhattan, crossing the East River via the Queensboro Bridge. It would travel to LaGuardia Airport, then make two additional stops before proceeding to JFK. After the Port Authority found that the ridership demand might not justify the cost of the rail link, the MTA downgraded the project's priority.

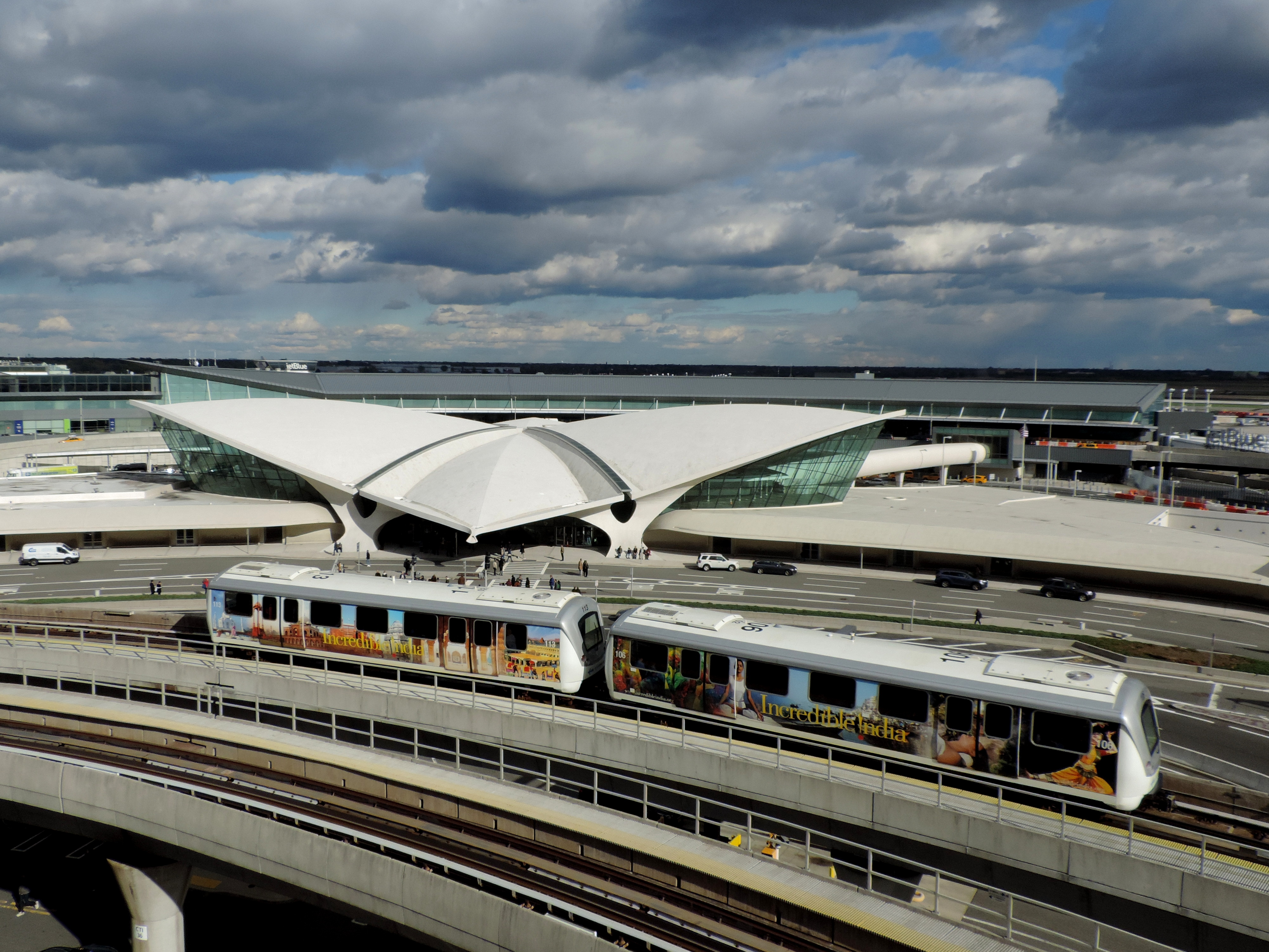
An AirTrain in front of the TWA Flight Center

To fund the project, the Port Authority introduced a Passenger Facility Charge (PFC), a $3 tax on every passenger departing from JFK, in 1991. The tax would provide $120 million annually. The Port Authority started reviewing blueprints for the JFK rail link in 1992. At the time, it was thought that the link could be partially open within six years. By then, the project's budget had grown to $2.6 billion. The project was to start in 1996, but there were disputes over where to locate the Manhattan terminal, as well as whether the connector should even go into Manhattan. To pay for the project, the Port Authority would charge a one-way ticket price of between $9 and $12.

By February 1995, plans for the link were in jeopardy, as the cost of the planned link had increased to over $3 billion in the previous year alone. Mario Cuomo's successor, George Pataki, expressed skepticism about the JFK rail link's viability during the previous year's gubernatorial campaign. The direct rail link between LaGuardia/JFK and Manhattan was canceled outright in May 1995 because of its political unpopularity. The planned JFK Airport connection was downsized to a 7.5-mile (12.1 km) monorail or people mover. In August 1995, the Federal Aviation Administration approved the Port Authority's request to use the already collected PFC money to fund the new monorail plan instead. Ultimately, a light rail with the qualities of a people mover, tentatively called the "JFK Light Rail System", was selected as the most feasible mode of transportation for the new system.

The Port Authority voted to proceed with the scaled-down system in 1996. The system would connect to the LIRR and the Archer Avenue subway at Jamaica station, and to the Rockaway Line at Howard Beach station. Construction of the system began in May 1998. The system, known as the AirTrain JFK, opened on December 17, 2003.

== Service changes ==
Two service changes were inaugurated as a result of the Program for Action. The first went into effect on Sunday, December 11, 1988, when the Archer Avenue Lines opened. The second occurred on Sunday, October 29, 1989, when the 63rd Street Lines opened.

Most of the changes occurred in conjunction with the opening of the new Archer Avenue Subway. However, some changes were completely coincidental. These changes affected over 3.7 million daily riders. Maps were offered to rush-hour subway riders on December 12, 1988, one day after the initial changes.

- The B, D, and Q trains were all rerouted from the express tracks of the BMT Broadway Line to the express tracks of the IND Sixth Avenue Line as part of Manhattan Bridge reconstruction. No more express service was to be run on the Broadway Line, since these services comprised the entirety of Broadway express service. This also eliminated the divided B and D services (the Sixth Avenue Line B/D services were separate from the Broadway Line B/D services, as the Sixth Avenue services had originated at 34th Street–Herald Square and continued to upper Manhattan and the Bronx via the IND Eighth Avenue Line and the IND Concourse Line).
- The A train was to run express more frequently on the IND Fulton Street Line in Brooklyn.
- The C train was to run local more frequently.
- The K train, running local on the IND Eighth Avenue Line, was replaced by the B and C trains. The B train was to run more frequently during middays to replace the K in Upper Manhattan.
- The Sixth Avenue Shuttle between 57th and Grand Streets was discontinued; service was replaced with the Q train on weekdays and the B train on weekends.
- The B train no longer ran along the BMT Astoria Line to Astoria–Ditmars Boulevard during weekdays. This was instead replaced by increased N service.
- The E and J trains were rerouted to Jamaica Center. Buses were also rerouted from the 169th Street station to the new Jamaica Center station to serve the rerouted subway services. A new skip-stop service, called the Z train, was implemented along the J route, similar to skip-stop service along the route prior to 1976.
- The R train was extended to Jamaica–179th Street to replace the E train along the eastern IND Queens Boulevard Line. The F train was to skip 169th Street on weekdays.
- The M train now stopped at Bowery during weekdays only.
- Several bus routes were renamed, particularly routes with Brooklyn ("B") designations that operated primarily in Queens.

By contrast, when the 63rd Street Subway opened, there were fewer service changes. The B and Q trains and the JFK Express were extended from 57th Street/Sixth Avenue in Manhattan to 21st Street–Queensbridge in Queens; the JFK Express would be eliminated less than six months later in 1990. The 2001 opening of the 63rd Street Connection resulted in more major service changes in the subway system, such as the reroute of the F to serve the 63rd Street Line, the truncation of G service to Court Square during weekdays, and the creation of a new weekday V service to cover the portions of the Queens Boulevard Line that were formerly served by the F and G trains.
