= Louis Gambaccini =

American government official (1931–2018)

Louis J. Gambaccini

New Jersey Commissioner of Transportation
- In office May 22, 1978 – September 25, 1981
- Preceded by: Russell Mullen
- Succeeded by: Anne Canby

Personal details
- Born: May 6, 1931
- Died: August 19, 2018 (aged 87)
- Education: University of Connecticut, MPA, Syracuse University

Louis J. Gambaccini (May 6, 1931 – August 19, 2018) was an American government official who spent his career in the area of transportation.

He was a graduate of the University of Connecticut and received a masters in public administration from the Maxwell School of Citizenship and Public Affairs at Syracuse University.

He spent 32 years at the Port Authority of New York and New Jersey, including 12 as vice president and general manager of the Port Authority Trans Hudson (PATH) rail system and as Assistant Executive Director. In these roles, he started two multi-agency coalitions, TransitCenter and Transcom. A resident of Ridgewood, New Jersey, he was nominated by Governor Brendan Byrne in 1978 to serve as New Jersey Commissioner of Transportation. He held that post until the end of the Byrne administration in 1982. Gambaccini later served eight years as the General Manager of the Southeastern Pennsylvania Transportation Authority (SEPTA). He served as chair of the American Public Transportation Association from 1992 to 1993. In 1998, he established the Alan M. Voorhees Transportation Center at Rutgers University's Edward J. Bloustein School of Planning and Public Policy, and was a senior fellow emeritus at that institution.

He was born May 6, 1931, and died at the age of 87 on August 19, 2018, at his home in the Skillman section of Montgomery Township, New Jersey.

== See also ==
- Peter C. Goldmark Jr.
- David L. Gunn
- Christopher O. Ward
