= Anthony Giuliano =

American politician (1898-1970)

Newark City Councilman At-Large
- In office 1962–1968
- Preceded by: Raymond V. Santoro
- Succeeded by: Anthony Imperiale

Essex County Clerk
- In office 1956–1961
- Preceded by: Russell Gates
- Succeeded by: Nicholas V. Caputo

Newark City Municipal Court Judge
- In office 1968–1969
- Appointed by: Hugh Addonizio
- In office 1948–1955

Member of the New Jersey General Assembly from Essex County
- In office 1927
- Preceded by: Anthony F. Minisi
- Succeeded by: David M. Litwin

Personal details
- Born: Anthony Giuliano; January 14, 1898 Newark, New Jersey, U.S.
- Died: February 4, 1970 (aged 72) Newark, New Jersey, U.S.
- Party: Republican
- Spouse: Mary Freda Giuliano
- Education: Barringer High School
- Alma mater: New York University Law School
- Occupation: American Lawyer

Anthony Giuliano (January 14, 1898 - February 4, 1970) was an American Republican Party politician who served in the New Jersey General Assembly and as a Judge and City Councilman in Newark, New Jersey. At the time of his death, he was under federal indictment for corruption charges. He was a candidate for an open Republican House seat in 1948, but was beaten by Democrat Peter W. Rodino, who would later serve as House Judiciary Committee Chairman during the Watergate scandal.

== Early life ==
Giuliano was born January 14, 1898, in Newark, New Jersey. He was a graduate of Barringer High School, where he was selected for All-State honors in football. He was a 1920 graduate of New York University Law School.

== Political career ==
In 1926, at age 28, Giuliano was elected to the New Jersey State Assembly. He resigned in late 1927 following his appointment as an Assistant U.S. Attorney for the District of New Jersey. He practiced law in Newark during the 1930s and 1940s.

In 1948, ten-term Republican Congressman Fred A. Hartley Jr., nationally prominent as the House sponsor of the Labor Management Relations Act of 1947, known as Taft-Hartley, decided not to seek re-election. Giuliano became a candidate for Hartley's seat. In the Republican primary, he defeated 30-year-old Belleville Mayor James J. Tully, 21,763 to 15,637, with 3,153 votes for former Newark City Commissioner Reginald Parnell, who had been acquitted on corruption charges more than a decade earlier.

In the general election, Giuliano faced Peter W. Rodino, a 39-year-old lawyer and World War II veteran who had won 46% against Hartley two years earlier. Rodino won by 5,800 votes, 58,668 (50.72%) to 52,868 (45.70%).

From 1948 to 1955, Giuliano was a Newark Municipal Court Judge. He was elected Essex County Clerk in 1955. Instead of seeking re-election in 1960, Giuliano instead ran for Essex County Register of Deeds and Mortgages, but was defeated by Democrat Madaline A. Williams, who had been the first African American woman to serve in the New Jersey State Assembly.

In 1962, Giuliano was elected Newark Councilman At-Large. He was re-elected in 1966.

He resigned from the City Council in 1968 following his appointment as a Newark Municipal Court Judge by Mayor Hugh Addonizio.

== Indictment ==
On December 17, 1969, Giuliano was one of 14 local officials indicted by a Federal grand jury, along with Mayor Addonizio. He was charged with income tax evasion, conspiracy and extortion. The New Jersey Supreme Court suspended from his judgeship following the indictment. Health issues prevented Giuliano from being arraigned and had not yet pleaded to the charges against him when he died of a heart attack at his home on February 4, 1970.

== Electoral history ==
=== United States House of Representatives ===
United States House of Representatives elections, 1948
Party	Candidate	Votes	%
Democratic	Peter W. Rodino	58,668	50.72
Republican	Anthony Giuliano	52,868	45.7
Independent	John V. Laddey	3,795	3.28
Prohibition	William H. Schafer	345	0.3
Total votes		115,676	100

=== United States House of Representatives Republican Primaries ===
1948 New Jersey's 10th congressional district Republican Primary Election
Candidate	Votes	%
Anthony Giuliano	21,763	53.67
James J. Tully	15,637	38.56
Reginald Parnell	3,153	7.78
Total votes	40,553	100
