= Hymen B. Mintz =

American politician (1909-1986)

Essex County Register of Deeds and Mortgages
- In office January 1970 – January 1975
- Preceded by: Madaline A. Williams
- Succeeded by: Larrie W. Stalks

Member of the Essex County Board of Chosen Freeholders
- In office January 1967 – January 1970

Member of the New Jersey General Assembly from Essex County
- In office January 1954 – January 1958
- Preceded by: Samuel Saiber
- Succeeded by: Isadore Laufer

Personal details
- Born: Hymen Benjamin Mintz; September 12, 1909 Newark, New Jersey, U.S.
- Died: November 1, 1986 (aged 77) Livingston, New Jersey, U.S.
- Party: Republican
- Spouse: Beatrice Altshuler Mintz
- Education: Lafayette Grammar School; Central High School
- Alma mater: Upsala College (B.A., 1929); Rutgers University Law School (J.D., 1932)

Hymen Benjamin Mintz (September 12, 1909 - November 1986) was an American Republican Party politician who served in the New Jersey General Assembly from 1954 to 1957.

== Early life ==
Mintz was born September 12, 1909, in Newark, New Jersey, the son of Abraham and Gussie Mintz, both immigrants from Russia. He had an older sister, Sally. He attended Lafayette Grammar School and Central High School in Newark, and was a 1929 graduate of Upsala College. He received his law degree from Rutgers University Law School in 1932, and was admitted to the New Jersey Bar the following year. Mintz practiced law in Newark for his entire career.

== Political career ==
=== New Jersey State Assembly ===
Mintz was elected to the State Assembly in 1953, and was re-elected in 1955. He did not seek re-election to a second term in 1957.

=== Essex County Freeholder ===
In 1966, Mintz was elected to the Essex County Board of Chosen Freeholders.

=== Essex County Register of Deeds and Mortgages ===
Following the death of Democratic incumbent Madaline A. Williams in 1968, Mintz became the Republican nominee for Essex County Register of Deeds and Mortgages in 1969 and was elected. He did not seek re-election in 1974; Mintz's Deputy, William L. Stubbs, lost in the Democratic landslide that year.

In 1979, Mintz mounted what was widely viewed as a quixotic campaign for County Register against his successor, Democrat Larrie W. Stalks. He ran on a single issue: the elimination of the office to save money. Boosted by the indictment of Democratic Sheriff John F. Cryan, who was defeated for re-election, Mintz came within 800 votes of upsetting Stalks.

== Family and later life ==
Mintz was married to Beatrice Altshuler Mintz (June 28, 1914 - December 3, 2010) and had two children: Mark Allen and Joan Ellen. They resided in Newark before moving to Livingston, New Jersey. Mintz served as a Trustee of Rutgers Law School and as a Trustee of the Boys Club of America. He later served as President of the Livingston Republican Club. He died in Livingston in November 1986.

His daughter, Joan Mintz, served in the administration of Governor Thomas Kean as the Deputy Director of the New Jersey Division on Aging.

On August 4, 1987, Beatrice Mintz donated her late husband's collection of historic legal papers to the New Jersey Historical Society. The collection mostly included papers related to civil and criminal cases tried between 1805 and 1840 in Essex County by many historically prominent lawyers.
