= William H. Rawson =

William Howard Rawson (January 27, 1892 – August 26, 1957) was an American Republican Party politician from New Jersey who served six terms on the Essex County Board of Freeholders.

== Biography ==
He was born on January 27, 1892. He was a graduate of Stevens Preparatory School and New York University Law School.

He served as a Judge of the Recorder's Court in Bloomfield, New Jersey from 1919 to 1931. He served as the Supervisor of Bills for the New Jersey General Assembly. In 1930, he was the unsuccessful Republican candidate for Essex County Register of Deeds and Mortgages. He was elected Essex County Freeholder in 1932, and was re-elected in 1935, 1938, 1941, 1944 and 1947.

He was elected Freeholder Director in 1934. and again in 1941. He gave up his Freeholder seat in 1950 to run for the U.S. House of Representatives against freshman Congressman Peter W. Rodino. Rodino won by 21,819 votes, 60,432 (61.02%) to 38,613 (38.99%).

He died on August 26, 1957.
