= Edward R. McGlynn =

American politician

Edward R. McGlynn, an American Republican Party politician, served as chief of staff to New Jersey Governor Thomas Kean. He is the brother of Richard McGlynn, a former Superior Court Judge and state utilities regulator who lost the 1981 Republican gubernatorial primary to Kean. His father, William E. McGlynn, was a two-term councilman in Kearny, New Jersey and an unsuccessful candidate for Congress against Peter Rodino in 1954.

McGlynn is a graduate of McKendree College, Lebanon, Ill. After college, he worked as a labor relations representative for General Motors Corporation, and was responsible for negotiating grievance settlements with the United Auto Workers of America. He later attended Seton Hall University Law School at night and during the day worked as an investigator with the Essex County Prosecutors office. He graduated law school in 1974 and joined a firm which became McGlynn, McGlynn & McCormack. There, he served as planning board attorney for the Borough of Point Pleasant Beach for three years, then as the borough attorney until 1982.

In 1982, McGlynn became special assistant deputy attorney general to then attorney general Irwin Kimmleman and shortly thereafter became executive assistant deputy attorney general to Kimmleman. In 1984, he became Kean's deputy chief of staff. After the 1985, election, Kean named McGlynn as his chief of staff.

He practiced law after Kean left office. In 1995, McGlynn formed ERM Government Affairs, Inc., working in tandem with The Alman Group, and specializing in traditional lobbying and government affairs along with a significant amount of business development for many clients.
