= Richard McGlynn =

American Republican politician

Richard McGlynn is an American Republican Party politician who sought the Republican nomination for Governor of New Jersey in 1981. A former Superior Court Judge and Commissioner of the New Jersey Board of Public Utilities, he won just 1% of the vote as a candidate for Governor, finishing last in a field of 8 candidates. He now serves as Counsel at United Water Resources. He is a graduate of Princeton University and Rutgers University Law School.

McGlynn's brother, Edward R. McGlynn, later served as Chief of Staff to Governor Thomas Kean, the winner of the 1981 primary. His father, William E. McGlynn, was a two-term Councilman in Kearny, New Jersey and an unsuccessful candidate for Congress against Peter Rodino in 1954.

== 1981 Republican Gubernatorial Primary election ==
Candidate	Office	Votes	%
Thomas Kean	Former Assembly Speaker	122,512	31%
Pat Kramer	Former Mayor of Paterson	83,565	21%
Bo Sullivan	Businessman	67,651	17%
James Wallwork	State Senator	61,816	16%
Barry T. Parker	State Senator	26,040	7%
Anthony Imperiale	State Assemblyman	18,452	5%
Jack Rafferty	Mayor of Hamilton	12,837	3%
Richard McGlynn	Former Superior Court Judge	5,486	1%
