= Carole A. Graves =

American politician

Essex County Register of Deeds and Mortgages
- In office January 1995 – January 2010
- Preceded by: Larrie W. Stalks
- Succeeded by: Philip Thigpen

Newark Teachers Union President
- In office 1968–1995
- Succeeded by: Joseph Del Grosso

Personal details
- Born: Carole Anderson; April 15, 1938 (age 88) Newark, New Jersey, U.S.

Carole Anderson Graves (born April 15, 1938, in Newark, New Jersey) is an American Democratic Party politician and labor leader who served three terms as the elected Essex County Register of Deeds and Mortgages and 27 years as the president of the Newark Teachers Union.

== Early life ==
Born Carole Anderson on April 13, 1938, in Newark, New Jersey, she was the fifth of six children of Philip and Valeria Anderson. After graduating high school, she worked for the telephone company before attending college. She is a 1960 graduate of Newark State Teacher College. She was a public school teacher, teaching students in special education.

== Union leader ==
She was 29 when she was elected president of the Newark Teachers Union in 1968. She presided over two strikes with the NTU; first a three-week strike in 1970, followed by an eleven-week strike almost exactly one year later in 1971. She was arrested during the 1970 strike and spent three months in the Essex County Jail on contempt charges.

Graves was defeated for re-election as president of the Newark Teachers Union in 1995 by Joseph Del Grosso by a vote of 1,809 to 1,015, after filing a lawsuit to block the state takeover of the Newark public school system.

== Political career ==
In 1981, Graves ran for the New Jersey General Assembly, challenging incumbents Willie B. Brown and Eugene Thompson in the Democratic primary. She lost, trailing Thompson by 2,685 votes.

Following the retirement of four-term incumbent Larrie W. Stalks in 1994, the Essex County Democratic Organization endorsed Graves as their candidate for Essex County Register of Deeds and Mortgages. She was re-elected by wide margins against Angelo Risoli in 1999 and Miguel Sanabria in 2004. She was not a candidate for re-election in 2009 after Democrats decided to back Newark-South Ward Democratic Municipal Chairman Dwight C. Brown for the post.

In 2010, Graves became a candidate for the Newark City Council, running for one of four At-Large Council seats. She finished sixth with 7,141 votes, 7,475 votes behind the winner of the fourth Council seat, Carlos M. Gonzalez.
