= Rocco Clarizio =

American politician

Rocco M. Clarizio (December 17, 1916 – August 24, 1990) was an American Republican Party politician from Newark, New Jersey. He ran for the U.S. House of Representatives in 1964 and for the New Jersey State Senate in 1977, but lost both times in the Republican primary. In 1964, Clarizio became a candidate for Congress in New Jersey’s 10th district, seeking to challenge Democratic incumbent Peter W. Rodino. In a historic primary where he was the only white candidate, Clarizio finished third behind two Black Republicans, William L. Stubbs and Dr. Harold R. Scott. Stubbs, who became the first Black to win a major party nomination for Congressman from New Jersey, won 5,148 (63%) to 2,217 (26%) for Scott, with Clarizio finishing third with 892 votes (11%). In 1977, Clarizo sought the Republican nomination for State Senator in the 28th legislative district, where Democratic incumbent Martin L. Greenberg was seeking re-election to a second term. The GOP primary included three candidates, each aligned with a different candidate for the Republican nomination for Governor: Rev. James A. Pindar ran on a line with Assembly Minority Leader Thomas Kean; Joan Lacey Mazauskas ran with State Sen. Raymond Bateman, and Clarizio was allied with former Senate Minority Leader C. Robert Sarcone. Pindar defeated Mazauskas by just 207 votes, 1,482 (42.04%) to 1,275 (36.17%), while Clarizio ran a distant third with 768 votes (21.79%).

Clarizio was a lawyer from Newark. He served in the U.S. Army during World War II.
