= Joan Lacey Mazauskas =

Joan Lacey Mazauskas (January 25, 1933 – April 23, 2003) was an American author and Republican Party politician. She was the author of Mayday! Mayday! Eastern Airlines in a Tailspin! (1990). In 1977, Mazauskas sought the Republican nomination for State Senator in the 28th legislative district of New Jersey, where Democratic incumbent Martin L. Greenberg was seeking re-election to a second term. The GOP primary included three candidates, each aligned with a different candidate for the Republican nomination for Governor: Joan Lacey Mazauskas ran with State Sen. Raymond Bateman, Rev. James A. Pindar ran on a line with Assembly Minority Leader Thomas Kean; and Rocco Clarizio was allied with former Senate Minority Leader C. Robert Sarcone. Pindar defeated Mazauskas by just 207 votes, 1,482 (42.04%) to 1,275 (36.17%), while Clarizio ran a distant third with 768 votes (21.79%). Her husband, George Mazauskas, served as a Town Councilman in Irvington, New Jersey.
