= Philip Thigpen =

Philip A. Thigpen (1926 – October 29, 2013) was an American Democratic Party politician who served as the Essex County Democratic Chairman and held county and local elected offices in New Jersey. He moved on from a political scandal and corruption conviction to become a powerful political leader and elected official admired by members of both parties.

== Early life ==
Thigpen was born in 1926, the son of John David Thigpen, a laborer, and Fannie Thigpen. He grew up in Rahway, New Jersey. He was a graduate of Seton Hall Prep. He excelled in track as a high school student and was the two-time national champion in the 880 yard run. He received B.S. in Business Administration from Seton Hall University, and an M.A. from St. Louis University. Representing the Seton Hall Pirates track and field team, Thigpen competed at the 1949 IC4A meeting. He was an Urban Fellow at Rutgers University. He was the national champion in the half-mile and the three-time National AAU Champion in the 1000-yard run while at Seton Hall. He is a member of the Seton Hall Prep Athletic Hall of Fame and the Seton Hall University Athletic Hall of Fame.

Thigpen was vice president of Urban Data Systems Inc., a Newark-based computer forms manufacturer, from 1980 to 1987. Thigpen's political ally and cousin, Donald M. Payne, also served as the firm's vice president before his election to Congress in 1988. Thigpen also served as executive vice president of Leon N. Weiner & Associates, Inc., a Wilmington-based real estate development firm. He managed a joint venture with Campbell Soup and RCA to develop low income housing projects.

== Public officeholder ==
Thigpen was appointed to the Essex County Board of Freeholders to fill a vacancy in 1987, but was not a candidate for a full term that year. He later returned as a freeholder. He also served as an East Orange city councilman.

He served as the director of the Essex County Department of Planning and Economic Development.

In the summer of 2009, the Democratic nominee for Essex County Register of Deeds and Mortgages, Dwight C. Brown, died after the Democratic primary at age 62. Thigpen became the Democratic nominee and defeated Republican Terriann Moore-Abrams by a 69%-28% margin.

He was appointed by the governor of New Jersey to the New Jersey Health Care Administration Board.

== Party leader ==
From 2004 until his death in 2013, Thigpen served as the Essex County Democratic Chairman. He succeeded Payne, who was forced to step down after new congressional rules established by the Bipartisan Campaign Reform Act (McCain-Feingold) prohibited members of congress from leading county political organizations.

Thigpen served on the New Jersey Congressional Redistricting Commission in 2012.

For the 2012 presidential election, he served as president of the New Jersey Electoral College, allowing him to cast New Jersey's 14 electoral votes for Barack Obama. He was a member of the Electoral College in 1996.

== Corruption conviction ==
Thigpen recovered from a political scandal that occurred early in his career, while employed by the Newark Housing Authority at a salary of $14,000 per year. In 1966, he pleaded guilty to state corruption charges. He admitted to creating phony timesheets for 16 individuals not employed by the authority, cashing the checks and pocketing the money — nearly $14,000. The funds came from a U.S. Department of Labor program that was supposed to be used for manpower training and poverty relief. Thigpen was sentenced to two years in state prison (he received a suspended sentence), five years of probation, and ordered to make full restitution. "I would like to say that I fully realize the seriousness of what I have done. The full impact has hit me in many ways, as well as the violation of the trust placed in me. I'm not offering any excuse, I'm heartily sorry," Thigpen told the judge at sentencing.

== Family ==
Thigpen was married to Ernestine Thigpen, and had three sons and four grandchildren.
