= James A. Pindar =

Catholic priest, educator, politician in US

The Rev. James A. Pindar (February 2, 1930 – May 8, 1984) was a Catholic priest, educator, and American Republican Party politician. He was a graduate of Seton Hall University, and the Darlington Seminary. He was ordained in 1954, and was an assistant pastor at St Mary's Church in Bayonne and St Brigid's Church in North Bergen. He received an MA in Communications from New York University and his law degree from Seton Hall University. He became a professor of communications at Seton Hall University in 1960. He served as the assistant superintendent of schools for the Newark Archdiocese from 1965 to 1967, as director of the archdiocese's radio and television office from 1967 to 1974, and of its communications office from 1974 to 1976.

Pindar was the Republican nominee for Essex County Freeholder in 1973, but lost the general election in the Democratic landslide of that year.

He became a candidate for the New Jersey State Senate in 1977, running in a contested Republican Primary on a line headed by gubernatorial candidate Thomas Kean, the Assembly Minority Leader. He won the nomination by just 207 votes, 1,482 (42.04%) to 1,275 (36.17%) against Joan Lacey Mazauskas, who ran on a ticket headed by gubernatorial candidate Raymond Bateman. A third candidate, Rocco M. Clarizio, received 768 votes (21.79%); Clarizio was allied with another candidate for governor, former State Senator C. Robert Sarcone. Pindar lost the general election to the incumbent Democratic senator, Martin L. Greenberg, 16,986 (57.80%) to 11,399 (38.79%), with former Democratic State Senator Nicholas Fernicola, running as an independent, receiving 770 votes(2.62%).

After Kean was elected governor in 1981, Pindar accepted a position as a special assistant to the Governor. Pindar represented the Governor at functions Kean was unable to attend. Pindar's new job created a bit of a controversy; Archbishop Peter Gerety of the Archdiocese of Newark issued a statement at the time saying, "In order to eliminate any misunderstanding among our people, I must state that Father Pindar has no permission from his Archbishop to accept such a post." Pindar said he did not believe official approval was necessary.

Pindar had a heart attack while at his doctors office. He died at Riverview Hospital in Red Bank. He was 54. Kean issued the following statement: "The death of Jim Pindar fills me with a deep sense of personal loss and sadness. He was a personal friend of many years standing and one to whom I turned very often for his advice, counsel and wisdom."
