= Larrie W. Stalks =

American politician

Larrie West Stalks

Essex County Register of Deeds and Mortgages
- In office January 1975 – January 1995
- Preceded by: Hymen B. Mintz
- Succeeded by: Carole A. Graves

Personal details
- Born: Larrie West; September 28, 1925 Newark, New Jersey, U.S.
- Died: April 2, 2015
- Party: Democratic
- Spouse: Frederick W. Stalks (1922-2002)

Larrie West Stalks (September 28, 1925 – April 2, 2015) was an American Democratic Party politician who served as the Essex County Register of Deeds and Mortgages from 1975 to 1995.

== Early life ==
Stalks was born on September 28, 1925, in Newark, New Jersey. Her brother is Calvin D. West, who in 1966 became the first African American to win a seat on the Newark City Council. She attended Rutgers University and New York University.

== Political career ==
She began her political career in the early 1940s as executive secretary to Congressman Hugh Joseph Addonizio, working in the Newark congressional office. After Addonizio was elected mayor of Newark in 1962, she became the executive secretary of the Newark Planning Board. In 1967, Addonizio appointed her to serve in his cabinet as director of the Newark Department of Health and Welfare, the first African American to serve as a department head in the city. A New Jersey Superior Court Judge later ruled that Stalks was not qualified for the post, which was later reconstituted to allow her to remain in office.

She served as the Newark-Central Ward Democratic municipal chairperson, and as co-chairman of the Newark campaign of Governor Robert B. Meyner.

In 1974, Stalks was elected Essex County Register of Deeds and Mortgages, defeating Republican William L. Stubbs. As a candidate for re-election in 1979, Stalks was nearly defeated after her Republican predecessor, Hymen B. Mintz, mounted a largely quixotic campaign to eliminate the office entirely. Stalks was running with Democratic sheriff John B. Cryan, who was under criminal indictment, and 1979 was a Republican year with President Jimmy Carter with low approval ratings. Stalks won, but by only about 800 votes in New Jersey's largest and most Democratic county. She was re-elected in 1984 and 1989 by wide margins.

She was elected president of the County Officers of the State of New Jersey 1984, and became a member of the National Association of County Officer’s (NACO) human services steering committee. Stalks served on the NACO board of directors.

Stalks also served as vice chairwoman of the Essex County Democratic Committee.

== Criminal indictment and conviction ==
Stalks was indicted on July 19, 1994, on federal bribery, extortion and theft charges relating to a public housing project where she served on the board of directors. Stalks was accused of giving businessman Anthony Zecchino, an alleged associate of the Lucchese crime family, a $1.5 million security contract in exchange for the kickbacks. She was also accused of using her position to give her husband, Frederick W. Stalks (December 7, 1922 - August 7, 2002), no-show jobs at Hill Towers, a 420-unit federally-subsidized low income housing project.

At the time of her indictment, Stalks had already announced that she would not seek re-election to a fifth term as county register, and had resigned her post as the Essex County Democratic vice chairwoman.

On September 27, 1995, Stalks appeared in federal court to plead guilty. She had received as much as $200,000 in kickbacks. "This is an example of how corruption directly impacts on people who are disadvantaged, minorities who live in housing projects, which are supposed to improve the quality of life for poor people," said Assistant U.S. Attorney Larry Stephen. "Under her corrupt management, Larrie Stalks ran the place into the ground and it became a blight on the Newark landscape."

== Later life ==
In 2008, Stalks was among those who wrote letters to U.S. District Court Judge William J. Martini urging leniency for former Newark mayor Sharpe James, who had been convicted on federal corruption charges.

As part of Essex County's celebration of Black History Month in 2013, Essex County Executive Joseph N. DiVincenzo, Jr. presented Stalks with the Coretta Scott King Leadership Award.

Stalks' husband, Frederick W. Stalks, died in 2002. Her only child, Stephen F. Stalks, died on January 6, 2011, at age 59.
