= William L. Stubbs =

William L. Stubbs (November 16, 1917 – April 12, 2003) is an American Republican Party politician who was the first African American to win a major party nomination for the United States House of Representatives in New Jersey District 11.

In a historic primary in 1964, featuring two Black candidates, Stubbs and Dr. Harold R. Scott, Stubbs won 5,148 (63%) to 2,217 (26%) for Scott, with Rocco Clarizio, the one white candidate, finishing third with 892 votes (11%).

A used car dealer from Newark, Stubbs but lost the general election to freshman Democratic U.S. Rep. Joseph Minish by a vote of 82,457 to 35,956. Stubbs later served as Deputy Essex County Register of Deeds and Mortgages and was the unsuccessful Republican nominee for Register against Democrat Larrie W. Stalks in 1974. He was for many years the Republican Party Chairman of Newark's Central Ward.
