= Joseph Minish =

American politician

Joseph George Minish
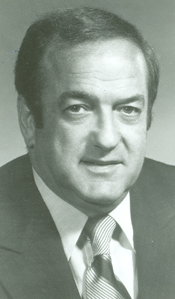

Member of the U.S. House of Representatives from New Jersey's 11th district
- In office January 3, 1963 – January 3, 1985
- Preceded by: Hugh J. Addonizio
- Succeeded by: Dean Gallo

Personal details
- Born: September 1, 1916 Throop, Pennsylvania, U.S.
- Died: November 24, 2007 (aged 91) Livingston, New Jersey, U.S.
- Party: Democratic

Joseph George Minish (September 1, 1916 – November 24, 2007) was an American labor organizer and Democratic Party politician who represented New Jersey in the United States House of Representatives from 1963 to 1985. He represented New Jersey's 11th congressional district, which centered on Newark and suburban Essex County, until redistricting resulted in his defeat by Republican Dean Gallo in the 1984 elections.

== Early life and education ==
Joseph George Minish was born on September 1, 1916 in Throop, Pennsylvania to George Joseph (1894–1932) and Angeline (née Nardozzi) Minish. His father was a coal miner, and his paternal grandfather, Vincenzo Minisci, had immigrated from Italy in 1886. His mother had also immigrated from Italy as an infant.

He had two brothers, James (1920–28) and Francis Xavier (1926–2009), and three sisters, Pauline Minish LaBelle (1918–2001); Mary Minish Mecca (1921–2000); and Lena Minish Mecca (1923–94).

Later in life, Minish reflected, "I was the head of my family when I was 13 years old. My dad was sent to the sanitarium with lungs full of coal dust. I quit high school thee times." Despite this, he graduated Dunmore High School in 1935 and served in the United States Army from 1945 to 1946.

== Labor organizer ==
Minish spent his early career in organized labor. In the early 1940s, he relocated to New Jersey. From 1954 to 1960, he was the executive secretary of the Essex and West Hudson Council of the Congress of Industrial Organizations. Following the AFL-CIO merger, he became executive director of the council from 1960 to until his election to Congress in 1962.

== U.S. House of Representatives ==
=== Elections ===
==== 1962 ====
In 1962, Minish ran for the United States House of Representatives to succeed Hugh J. Addonizio, who had been elected as mayor of Newark. The district included tenements and low-cost housing in Newark, as well as wealthy suburbs like the Oranges. The Essex County Democratic organization endorsed Minish to defend the seat, which was considered to be politically competitive, and he was unopposed in the party primary. In the general election, he faced Frank A. Palmieri, a Republican lawyer who had won 36 percent of the vote against Addonizio in 1960. Labor leaders rallied behind Minish, whose platform included federal aid for education, construction, and teacher salaries; extension of the Social Security Act; long-term loans and technical assistance to emerging nations, and the establishment of a Department of Urban Affairs. Minish won by a large margin with over 59 percent of the vote.

==== 1964–82 ====
Minish was easily re-elected to ten more terms in office. In 1964, he beat William L. Stubbs, the first African American to win a major party nomination for Congress in New Jersey. His other Republican opponents were attorney Leonard Felzenberg (1966); George M. Wallhauser Jr. (1968); businessman James Shue (1970); former state senator Milton Waldor (1972); attorney William Grant (1974); former Essex County Young Republican chair Charles Poekel (1976); businessman Julius George Feld (1978); conservative activist Bob Davis (1980); and Rey Redington (1982).

==== 1982 ====
In early 1984, the Supreme Court of the United States ordered revision of New Jersey's congressional map to comply with Article I, Section 2 of the United States Constitution. The new map removed most of the Democratic-leaning areas of Essex County from Minish's district and extended it far to the west, taking in most of Republican-heavy Morris County. Although Minish joked the new map pushed his district so far west that he might as well be a congressman from Pennsylvania, he opted to run for re-election.

In the general election, Minish lost to Republican Assembly leader Dean Gallo with only 44 percent of the vote. Minish blamed the loss on redistricting, saying, "I'm not sure the good Lord could have survived." He also blamed special interest groups who had long lobbied against him. "If you measure a man by his enemies, I'm pleased to have these guys as my enemies," he said. "They're no good for the country. They're greedy." No Democratic nominee would win 40 percent of the vote in the district again until Mikie Sherrill won the seat in 2018.

=== Tenure ===
During his eleven terms in the House, Minish served on the Committee on Banking, Finance and Urban Affairs and chair of its subcommittee on General Oversight. The Newark Star-Ledger described him as a staunch party loyalist and supporter of organized labor who ran a strong constituent service operation but had no real impact on legislation.

As a relatively conservative member of the Democratic caucus, he drew mediocre ratings from civil liberties groups, supported the Vietnam War, and opposed campaign finance reform and legalized abortion. Minish was a supporter of big financial institutions and received considerable campaign contributions from the banking industry. He won some headlines for criticizing profiteering by defense contractors and accusing natural gas producers of price gouging.

== Personal life, death, and legacy ==
Minish was a longtime resident of West Orange, New Jersey. His wife, Theresa V. LaCapra (1920–97), was the daughter of Italian immigrants.

In 1973, his son George sought the Democratic nomination for the New Jersey General Assembly. He was not backed by the Essex County Democratic organization and was defeated in the primary by Richard Codey and Eldridge Hawkins. Another son, James Minish, has served as an executive vice president of the New Jersey Sports and Exposition Authority. His grandson, Joseph Minish, was an assistant U.S. attorney for the District of New Jersey from 2004 to 2025 and appointed as a New Jersey Superior Court judge in 2025.

=== Death and legacy ===
Minish died on November 26, 2007 at St. Barnabas Medical Center in Livingston of undisclosed causes. Governor Jon Corzine ordered all United States and New Jersey flags flown at half-staff on December 5 "to honor the memory and the passing of Representative Minish."

The Joseph G. Minish Passaic River Waterfront and Historic Area in Newark was dedicated in 2008.

U.S. House of Representatives
Preceded by Hugh Joseph Addonizio	Member of the U.S. House of Representatives from New Jersey's 11th congressional district 1963–1985	Succeeded by Dean Gallo
