= Essex County Register of Deeds and Mortgages =

The Essex County Register of Deeds and Mortgages is an elected, statutory officer in Essex County, New Jersey, USA who is responsible under the law for recording, filing, and preserving all property transactions within the 22 municipalities of the County. The term of office is five years. Essex County is one of the two counties in New Jersey to have this office; in the other 19 counties, the Office of County Clerk is responsible for recording.

== History ==
2015–present: Dana Rone (Democrat), Elected 2014. Rone is a former Newark City Councilwoman. She defeated Republican James Boydston with 74.4% of the vote.

2013–2014: William Narvaez (Democrat), became Acting Register following Thigpen's death and served until Rone took the oath of office in January 2015.

2010–2013: Philip J. Thigpen (Democrat), elected 2009. Thigpen, the Essex County Democratic Chairman, became the replacement candidate for Register after the winner of the 2009 primary, Dwight C. Brown, died after the Democratic primary at age 62. Thigpen defeated Republican Terriann Moore-Abrams by a 69%-28% margin.

1995–2010: Carole A. Graves (Democrat), elected 1999, Re-elected 2004. Graves was the former President of the Newark Teachers Union. She was not a candidate for re-election in 2010.

1975–1995: Larrie W. Stalks (Democrat), Elected 1974, Re-elected 1979, 1984, 1989 and 1994. She was not a candidate for re-election in 1999. She defeated Republican John Taliaferro in 1974, and just narrowly won in 1979 against Republican Hymen B. Mintz. a former Assemblyman who had served as County Register from 1970 to 1975; Mintz had run on a single platform of eliminating the office.

1970–1975: Hymen B. Mintz (Republican), Elected 1969. Did not seek re-election in 1974.

1968–1970: Vacant

1960–1968: Madaline A. Williams (Democrat), Elected 1960, Re-elected 1965. Died in office in 1968.
