= Madaline A. Williams =

American politician

Madaline A. (Worthy) Williams (May 5, 1894 – December 14, 1968) was an American Democratic Party politician who was the first African-American woman elected to the New Jersey Legislature.

== Early life and career ==
Williams was born in Brunswick, Georgia, in 1894, the daughter of Josephine Frances (Jenkins) and Ephraim Wilford Worthy. She attended an all-black public elementary school and Selden Normal School in Brunswick, and then studied at Atlanta University for one year. In 1917 her family moved to Trenton, New Jersey, where she attended the State Normal School (now The College of New Jersey) as an extension student. She taught in the Trenton Public Schools for eight years.

She met Samuel A. Williams, a Newark post office worker, and they were married in New York City on April 2, 1926. Their only child, Samuel Alexander, was born on February 15, 1927. After their son's birth, the Williams family moved to East Orange. She became active in civic and church activities, as well as becoming youth division adviser and board member of the local branch of the NAACP. Her husband was a member of the national board of the NAACP and was New Jersey state president.

Williams volunteered for the YWCA of The Oranges and Maplewood and served in several leadership capacities. She was one of the organizers of the East Orange League of Women Voters, serving as its vice president in 1947. In 1952, Governor Alfred Driscoll appointed her to the New Jersey Migrant Labor Board.

== Political career ==
Through her work on the Migrant Labor Board Williams became interested in politics. In 1957 she was elected to the New Jersey General Assembly, becoming the first African-American woman elected to either house of the state legislature. She was reelected in 1959. In the Assembly she focused on child welfare, child labor, juvenile delinquency, and migrant labor legislation.

In 1960 she was elected Essex County Registrar, and was reelected in 1965. She was an alternate delegate to the 1960 Democratic National Convention and vice chairwoman of the delegation at the 1964 Convention in Atlantic City.

In 1961 she was involved in a widely publicized dispute over segregated hotel accommodations at the Civil War Centennial Commission meeting in Charleston, South Carolina, commemorating the opening shots of the Civil War at Fort Sumter one hundred years earlier. Williams attended as a member of the New Jersey delegation, but she was denied accommodations at the Francis Marion Hotel, where the meeting was to take place. In response, Williams and the director of the New Jersey Centennial Commission requested that the meeting be moved to “a location which will respect the fundamental Constitutional rights of persons of all races.” President John F. Kennedy, an ex officio member of the commission, supported the protest. The commission's executive committee originally refused to change the venue for the meeting, but eventually bowed to White House pressure and moved its sessions to the Charleston Naval Base.

Williams died in 1968 at Mountainside Hospital in Glen Ridge.
